= Lankester Botanical Garden =

Botanical garden in Costa Rica

Lankester Botanical Gardens
- Jardín Botánico Lankester
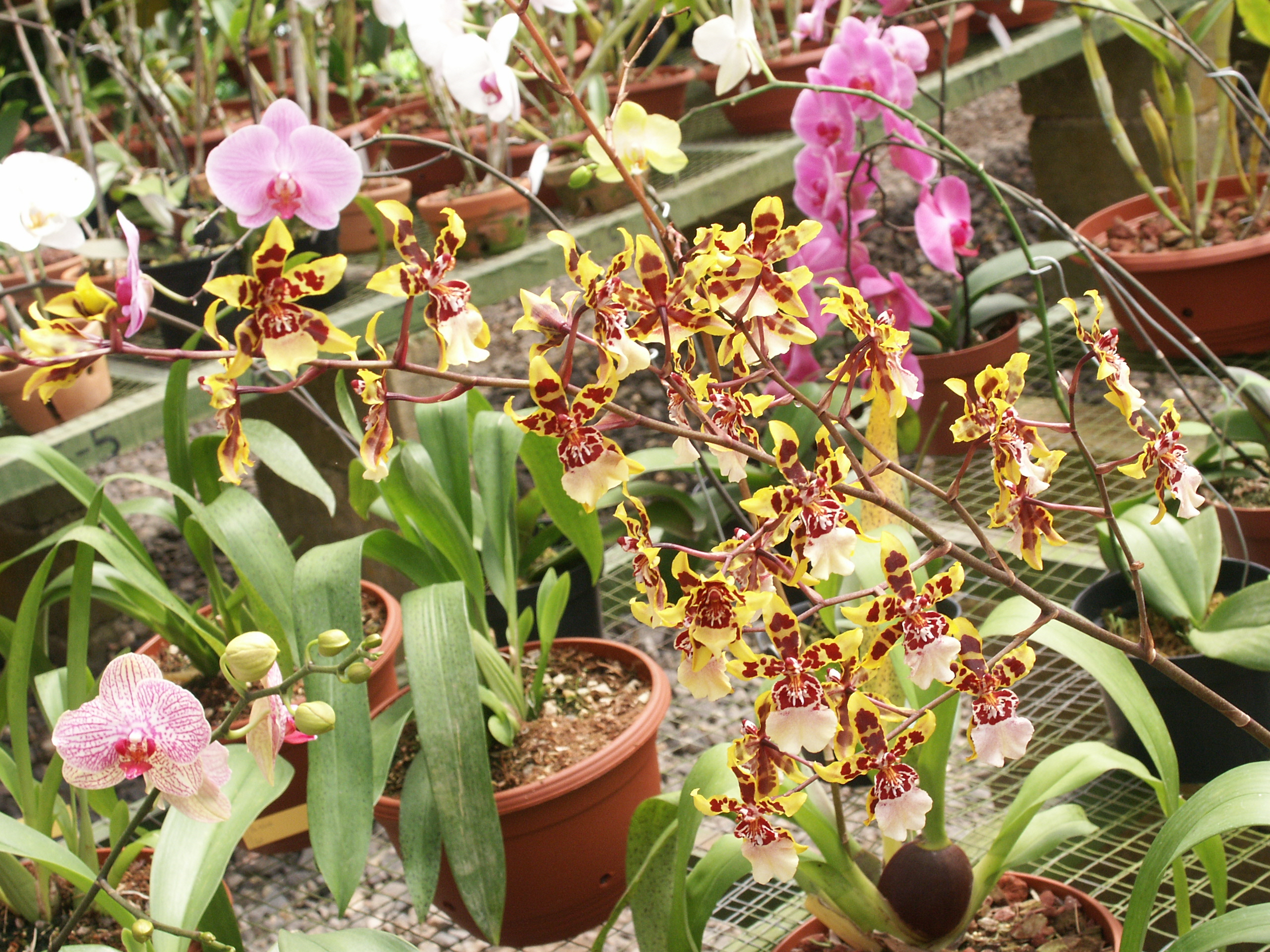
- Rows of orchids inside a research greenhouse
- Interactive map of Lankester Botanical Gardens
- Type: Botanical garden
- Location: Dulce Nombre district, Cartago canton, Cartago province, Costa Rica
- Nearest city: Cartago
- Coordinates: 9.83958°N 83.89006°W
- Created: 1940
- Operator: University of Costa Rica

The Lankester Botanical Gardens (also known as the Jardín Botánico Lankester or Charles H. Lankester Botanical Garden) are a set of gardens outside of Cartago, Costa Rica. The garden is open to the public, but is operated by the University of Costa Rica (UCR) as a research center and is a major center for orchid research in both Central America and the Caribbean.

== History ==
After some previous times in Costa Rica from 1900 onwards, Charles H. Lankester moved from England to Costa Rica in 1910, and around the same time began collecting orchids. Collecting samples, he sent them to orchidologists at Kew Gardens for identification. In 1924, he bought a coffee farm, known as Las Cóncavas from Francisco Quesada near Cartago, Costa Rica. On the farm was a large lagoon which attracted migratory birds. Near the lagoon, Lankester created an area which he called El Silvestre (uncultivated), which was reserved for orchids and other tropical plants. In 1955, he sold the rest of the farm, retaining only El Silvestre. When Lankester died in 1969, his daughter Dorothy inherited the property. In 1973, Dorothy sold the farm to the University of Costa Rica on the condition that it would be retained as a botanical garden. At the instigation of Rafael Lucas Rodríguez, the funds to secure the purchase were raised by donations from the Costa Rican Orchid Society, the American Orchid Society and the Stanley Smith Horticultural Trust. In 1979, Dora Emilia Mora de Retana was named first director of the garden. Mora worked to preserve the botanical garden and promote it as a research facility. Under her direction, UCR developed a course on orchidology in 1984 and the garden slowly grew to become an important center for study in the Caribbean and Central America.

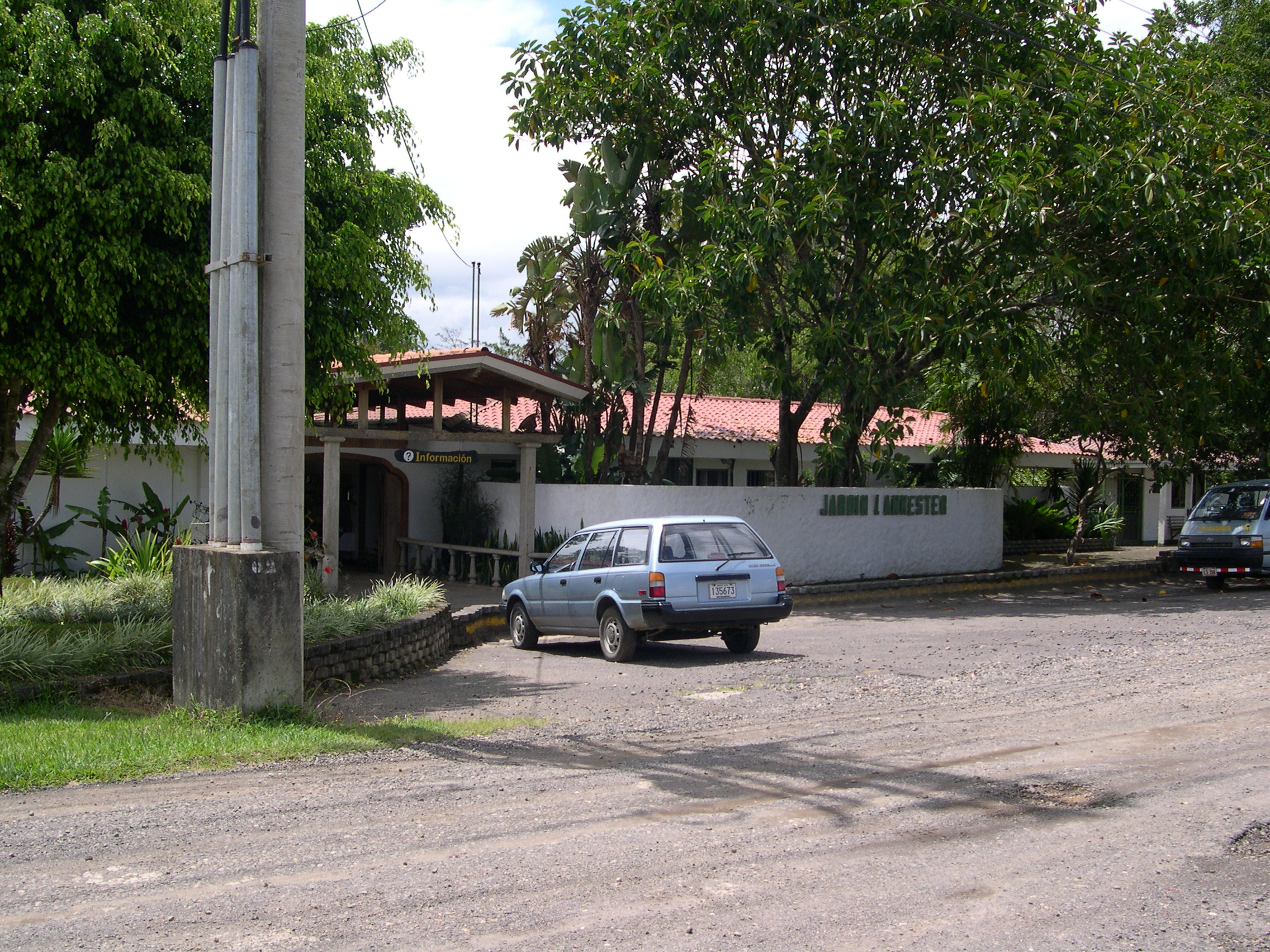
Exterior of Lankester Botanical Gardens

== Today ==
The mission statement of Lankester Garden is to "promote conservation, enjoyment and sustainable use of the epiphytic flora through scientific research, horticulture, and environmental education."

The garden sits on 11 hectares (27.2 acres) and is home to over 3000 species of plants, principally epiphytes, including orchids and bromeliads.

In 2003 the garden was redesignated by UCR as an experiment station to emphasize its dedication to scientific research. Two years later, the Environmental Ministry designated the garden "National Center for the Conservation of Flora" and "National Epiphyte Sanctuary".

== Japanese garden ==
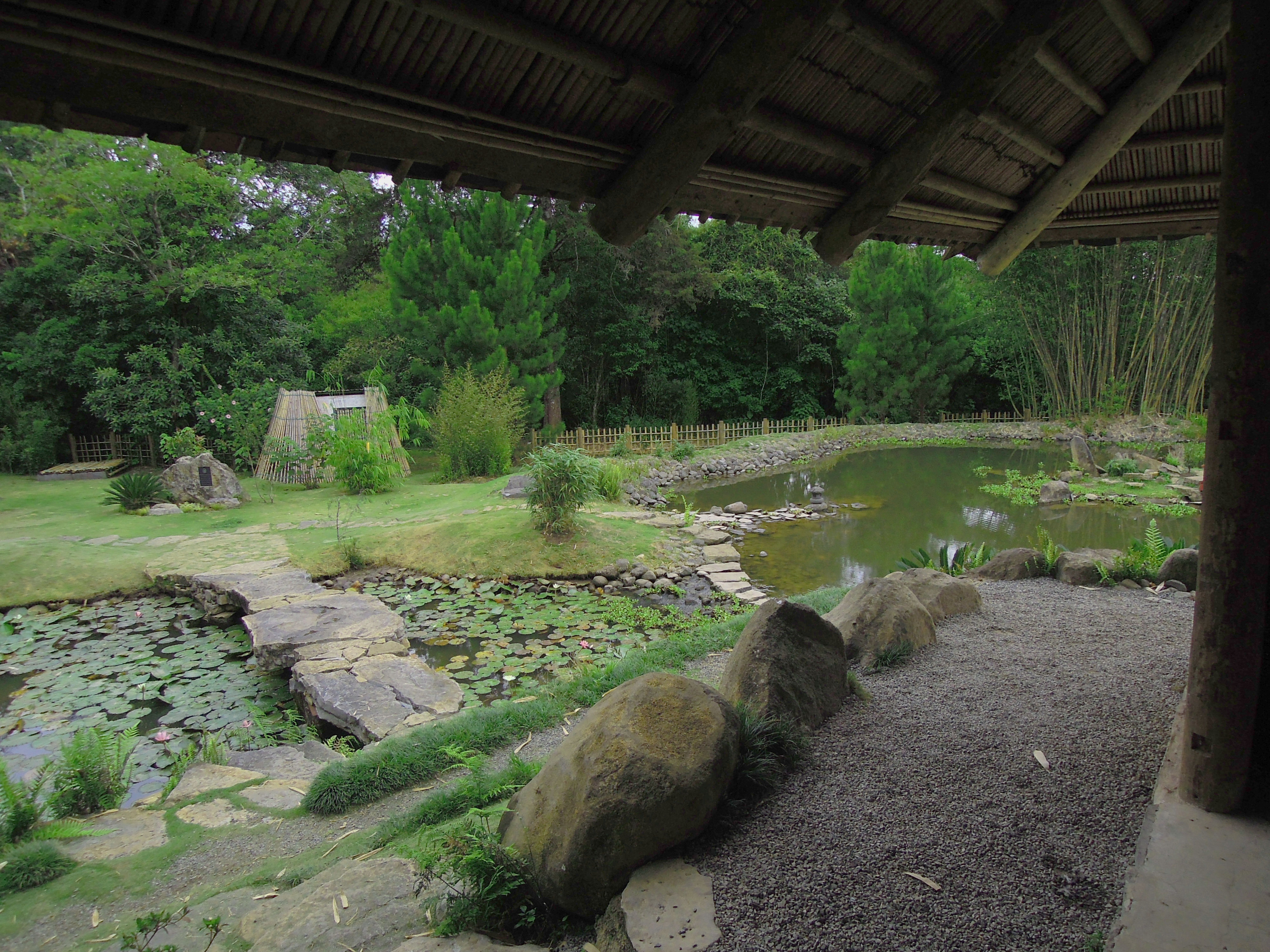
Pond of the Lankester Botanical Garden's Japanese garden.

The only japanese garden of the country is located within the garden, it was donated by the Japanese Government and inaugurated on 28 May 2009.

It contains elements such as a pond, teahouse, stone garden, stone lanterns, arch bridge and bamboo forest.
