= El Tejar =

El Tejar may refer to:

- El Tejar del Guarco, or Tejar de El Guarco, the capital of the El Guarco canton, in Cartago province, Costa Rica
- El Tejar, Chimaltenango, a municipality in Chimaltenango department, Guatemala
- El Tejar, Chiriquí, Panama

== See also ==
- Tejar (disambiguation)
