= Dora Emilia Mora de Retana =

Costa Rican botanist

- Born: Dora Emilia de los Angeles Mora Monge; 24 August 1939; Guanacaste Province, Costa Rica
- Died: 12 July 2001 (aged 61); Cartago, Costa Rica
- Occupation: Botanist
- Years active: 1979–2001
- Known for: Orchid family

Dora Emilia Mora de Retana (24 August 1939 – 12 July 2001), also known as Dora Emilia Mora-Monge de Retana, was a noted Costa Rican botanist, known primarily for her work with orchids. She compiled an extensive catalogue of the variations of the flower found in Costa Rica which became the seminal reference work on the family Orchidaceae in the country for over a decade.

There are at least five species of orchids named in her honor and in 2011, a plaque bearing her name was installed at the Lankester Botanical Garden to recognize her contributions to its development.

== Early life ==
Dora Emilia de los Angeles Mora Monge was born on 24 August 1939 in Cartago Province, Costa Rica. (Note: Her birth year is often cited as 1940, though civil records in Costa Rica give the year as 1939.) After completing her primary schooling at Escuela Sagrado Corazón de Jesús (Sacred Heart of Jesus School), she finished her high school studies in a school of the same name.

Going on to university, she enrolled in the University of Costa Rica to study botany and attained her bachelor's degree in Biology. She studied under Rafael Lucas Rodríguez, who developed the academic and scientific study of Costa Rican orchids, and graduated in 1968, becoming one of the first academically trained orchidologists in the country. Her thesis Crecimiento y desarrollo del ápice del vástago vegetativo y de la hoja de Acnistus arborescens Schltdl (Growth and development of the apex of the vegetative stem and leaf of Acnistus arborescens Schltdl), evaluated a type of Solanaceae.

== Career ==
In 1969 Mora became the Chair of Fundamentals of Biology at the University of Costa Rica (UCR) and then in 1973 assumed the Chair for General Biology. In 1978, she was promoted to Chair of General Botany, and the following year was named as the first director of the Lankester Botanical Garden. Under her direction, the private orchid farm was transformed into a botanical garden and research facility. She developed the first infrastructure of the garden and coordinated its landscape development, inviting scientists to conduct research activities. She is widely credited with bringing the facility to international acclaim.

In 1984, Mora collaborated with Robert Louis Dressler to prepare the first course on orchidology at UCR. In 1992, she published with Joaquín Bernardo García-Castro Lista actualizada de las orquídeas de Costa Rica (Updated list of Costa Rican orchids), the first catalogue of Costa Rican orchids printed since 1937. Their work included identification of forty-six new genera and four hundred sixty-seven new species identified since Paul Standley had published Flora of Costa Rica. The meticulous work became a consultative text for all researchers wanting to study the family Orchidaceae in Costa Rica for the next decade.

In 1989, her work with other scientists led to the inclusion of 300 illustrations of Costa Rican orchids, of which most samples were found in the Lankester Garden, in the series Icones Plantarum Tropicarum. She was a co-author of John T. Atwood's 1999 book Flora costaricensis on the Maxillarieae tribe of orchids native to Costa Rica, which would be her most important legacy to orchid taxonomy.

== Death and legacy ==
A year before her death de Retana was diagnosed with amyotrophic lateral sclerosis, commonly known as Lou Gehrig's disease, which prompted her retirement. Numerous new orchid species have been named in her honor, including: epidendrum mora-retanae named by Eric Hágsater, kefersteinia retanae identified by Günter Gerlach, sobralia doremiliae recorded by Robert Louis Dressler, stelis morae described by Carlyle A. Luer, and telipogon retanarum distinguished by Calaway H. Dodson and Rodrigo Escobar. In 2011, the University of Costa Rica dedicated a plaque to her memory in the Lankester Garden.

== Selected works ==
Mora published over 25 scientific articles concerning mainly orchids. Her most important publications include:

- Mora de Retana, Dora E.; García, Joaquín B. (1992). Lista actualizada de las orquídeas de Costa Rica (in Spanish). San José, Costa Rica: Museo Nacional de Costa Rica. OCLC 43409456.
- Atwood, John T.; Mora de Retana, Dora Emilia (1999). Burger, William (ed.). Flora costaricensis. Family #39 Orchidaceae, tribe Maxillariaceae, subtribes Maxillariinae and Oncidiinae. Botany: New Series. Vol. 40. Chicago, Illinois: Field Museum of Natural History. OCLC 266719624.
