= Tobosi =

District in El Guarco canton, Cartago province, Costa Rica

- District
- Tobosi district
- Tobosi district location in Costa Rica
- Coordinates: 9.8172445°N 83.9927646°W
- Country: Costa Rica
- Province: Cartago
- Canton: El Guarco

Area
  - Total: 19.9 km^{2} (7.7 sq mi)
- Elevation: 1,380 m (4,530 ft)

Population (2011)
  - Total: 6,569
  - Density: 330/km^{2} (855/sq mi)
- Time zone: UTC−06:00
- Postal code: 30803

Tobosi is a district of the El Guarco canton, in the Cartago province of Costa Rica. It is located about 3 miles southwest of the city of Cartago. It is also known as San Juan de Tobosi. St. John the Evangelist is the town's patron guardian.

== History ==
Tobosi is one of the oldest town in the country. It was established as a reduction by the Spanish authorities and the Franciscan friars around 1575, with a population of one hundred people. Other interpretations suggest that the town started with a hundred families.

Until 1826, the population consisted exclusively of indigenous peoples (ethnic Huet), but due to its proximity to the city of Cartago, its inhabitants were frequently used as forced labor for the benefit of the Spanish population and rapidly lost their language, dress and customs.

In 1568, responding to protests against the common abuses resulting from the direct enslavement of indigenous people by conquistadors, the Spanish King, Phillip II, created laws to protect the Indians and decreed such parceling out of indigenous peoples as slaves to be illegal. Instead of being owned directly by individual conquistadors, Indian villages or tribes were to pay a prescribed amount into a fund out of which an annual stipend was to be paid to each of the grantees. Nonetheless, the conquistadors protested to their Governor against this new arrangement and in January 1569 the Governor, Pero Afán de Ribera y Gómez, illegally apportioned the indigenous peoples as slaves, including those of the villages surrounding Cartago, among approximately forty Spaniards.

During its period of Spanish domination, the town had its own town council or municipality, which was abolished in 1836 by the government of Braulio Carrillo Colina. Like other indigenous communities in the Central Valley of Costa Rica, the people also lost their communal lands, which were confiscated and sold at public auction.

== Geography ==
Tobosi has an area of 19.9 km^{2} (7.7 sq mi) and an elevation of 1,380 metres.

== Locations ==
- Poblados (villages): Achiotillo, Barrancas, Bodocal, Garita, Purires, Tablón

== Demographics ==
Historical population
Census	Pop.	±% p.a.
1883	814	—
1892	755	−0.83%
1950	1,179	+0.77%
1963	1,467	+1.70%
1973	2,161	+3.95%
1984	2,833	+2.49%
2000	5,418	+4.14%
2011	6,569	+1.77%
2022	7,645	+1.39%
Source: Instituto Nacional de Estadística y Censos; Centro Centroamericano de Población

For the 2011 census, Tobosi had a population of 6,569 inhabitants.

== Transportation ==
=== Road transportation ===
The district is covered by the following road routes:

- National Route 228

== Economy ==
The main economic activities are agriculture, livestock and some handicrafts baskets and rope.
