= Tierra Blanca, Cartago =

District in Cartago canton, Cartago province, Costa Rica

Tierra Blanca
- District
- View from Tierra Blanca
- Tierra Blanca district
- Tierra Blanca district location in Costa Rica
- Coordinates: 9.9306506°N 83.8893687°W
- Country: Costa Rica
- Province: Cartago
- Canton: Cartago
- Creation: 5 December 1919

Area
  - Total: 12.75 km^{2} (4.92 sq mi)
- Elevation: 2,080 m (6,820 ft)

Population (2011)
  - Total: 5,103
  - Density: 400.2/km^{2} (1,037/sq mi)
- Time zone: UTC−06:00
- Postal code: 30108

Tierra Blanca is a district of the Cartago canton, in the Cartago province of Costa Rica.

== History ==
Tierra Blanca was created on 5 December 1919 by Decreto Ejecutivo 22.

== Geography ==
Tierra Blanca has an area of 12.75 km^{2} (4.92 sq mi) and an elevation of 2,080 metres. It is located about 3 miles north of the city of Cartago, Costa Rica; resting on the slopes of the mountain whose summit is the Irazú Volcano.

== Demographics ==
Historical population
| Census | Pop. | ±% p.a. |
|---|---|---|
| 1927 | 1,102 | — |
| 1950 | 1,819 | +2.20% |
| 1963 | 2,284 | +1.77% |
| 1973 | 2,656 | +1.52% |
| 1984 | 3,527 | +2.61% |
| 2000 | 4,639 | +1.73% |
| 2011 | 5,103 | +0.87% |
| 2022 | 4,635 | −0.87% |
Source: Instituto Nacional de Estadística y Censos; Centro Centroamericano de Población

For the 2011 census, Tierra Blanca had a population of 5,103 inhabitants.

== Transportation ==
=== Road transportation ===
The district is covered by the following road routes:

- National Route 401

== Economy ==
Tierra Blanca is a small farming community made up of about 5,000 inhabitants of mostly Spanish descent. The people of Tierra Blanca farm mostly potatoes, onions and carrots, with a few who farm strawberries as well. The climate is moderate, but cold in comparison with the rest of Costa Rica.
