= Quebradilla =

District in Cartago canton, Cartago province, Costa Rica

- District
- Quebradilla district
- Quebradilla district location in Costa Rica
- Coordinates: 9.8499843°N 84.001924°W
- Country: Costa Rica
- Province: Cartago
- Canton: Cartago
- Creation: 16 March 1983

Area
  - Total: 18.91 km^{2} (7.30 sq mi)
- Elevation: 1,410 m (4,630 ft)

Population (2011)
  - Total: 5,349
  - Density: 282.9/km^{2} (732.6/sq mi)
- Time zone: UTC−06:00
- Postal code: 30111

Quebradilla is a district of the Cartago canton, in the Cartago province of Costa Rica.

== History ==
Quebradilla was created on 16 March 1983 by Decreto Ejecutivo 14371-G. Segregated from Guadalupe.

== Geography ==
Quebradilla has an area of 18.91 km^{2} and an elevation of 1,410 metres.

== Demographics ==
Historical population
Census	Pop.	±% p.a.
1984	2,410	—
2000	4,697	+4.26%
2011	5,349	+1.19%
2022	10,116	+5.96%
Source: Instituto Nacional de Estadística y Censos; Centro Centroamericano de Población

For the 2011 census, Quebradilla had a population of 5,349 inhabitants.

== Transportation ==
=== Road transportation ===
The district is covered by the following road routes:

- National Route 206
- National Route 228
- National Route 407
