= Costa Rica Institute of Technology =

University in Costa Rica

- Tecnológico de Costa Rica
- Other name: TEC
- Motto: Formación Sólida, Óptimos Resultados
- Type: Public, undergraduate, graduate.
- Established: 1971
- Rector: María Estrada Sanchez
- Students: 9,081 (2012)
- Location: Cartago, Costa Rica; 9°51′16.4″N 83°54′32.5″W
- Campus: Urban, 88 hectares (220 acres)
- Other locations: San Carlos, San José, Alajuela, Limon
- Website: www.tec.ac.cr

The Costa Rica Institute of Technology (TEC) (Spanish: Tecnológico de Costa Rica) is a university in Costa Rica specializing in engineering and advanced science and research, modeled as an institute of technology. Its main campus is located in the Dulce Nombre district of Cartago canton in the Cartago Province of Costa Rica, 24 km (15 mi) east of the capital San José.

The TEC is a national autonomous institution of higher education, dedicated to teaching, research and extension in technology and associated sciences. It was created by Law No. 4777 on 10 June 1971.

The TEC offers undergraduate and graduate studies in fields including engineering (construction, industrial production, electronics, industrial maintenance, biotechnology, mechatronics, computers), computer science and business management.

== History ==
=== Establishment ===
Rafael Ángel González Chaves a public school teacher from San Ramón was one of the first proponents of creating an institute of technology in the country. During the later part of the 1960s he was looking for supporters to introduce a bill that would create the institute. His efforts finally paid off when on June 10, 1971, president José Figueres Ferrer signed a law that mandated the creation of the Instituto Tecnológico de Costa Rica (Costa Rica Institute of Technology). The signing ceremony was held in the province of Cartago which was chosen as the location for the school's main campus.

At the time president Figueres indicated the need to emulate the successful models from other technology schools such as TEC de Monterrey, from whom he indicated he would request assistance in order to kickstart the project.

=== History ===
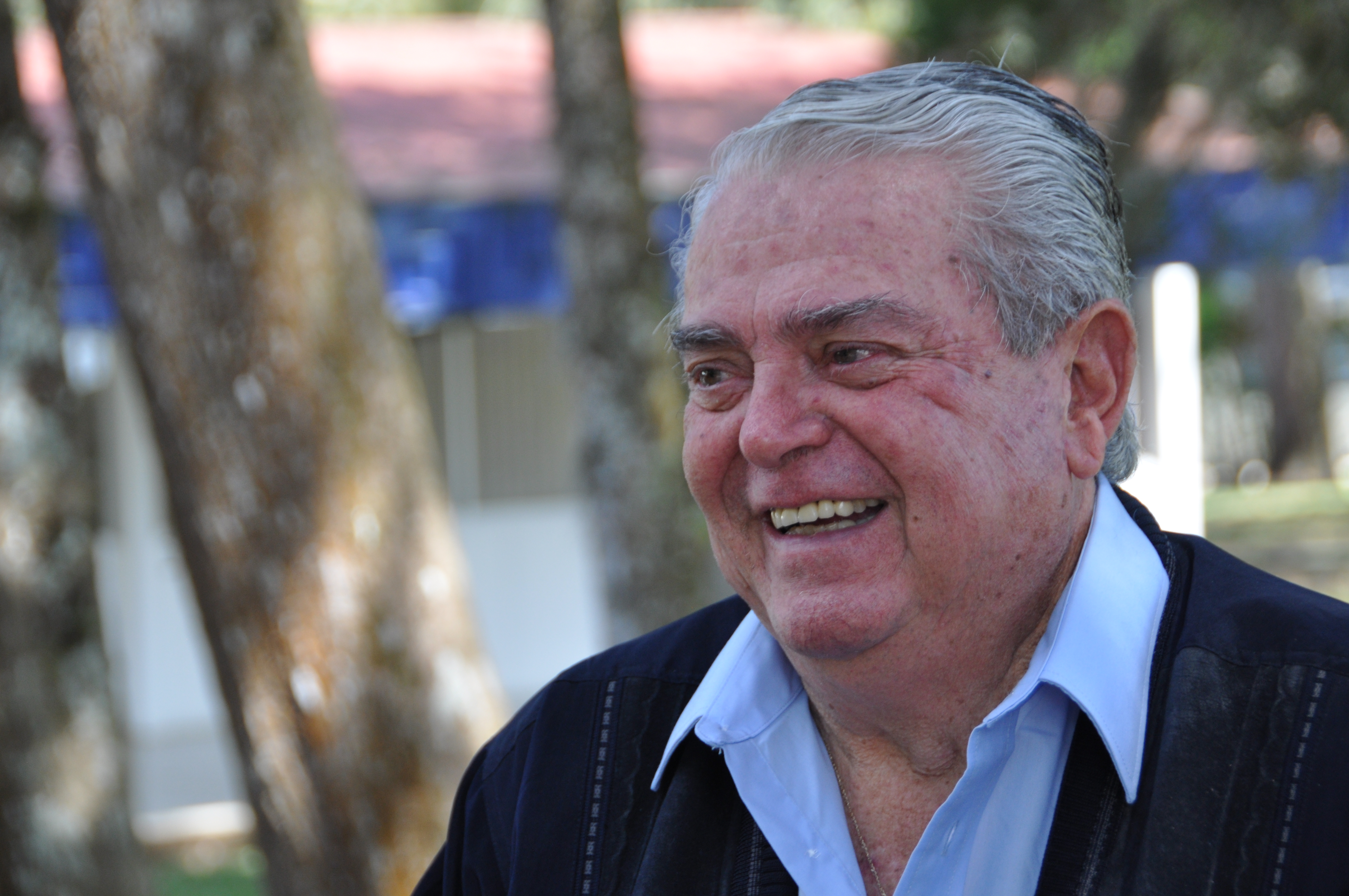
Vidal Quirós, first rector of TEC

Vidal Quirós Berrocal, a civil engineer was its first rector. The institute began functioning from a small house in downtown Cartago, and its first educational programs started in March 1973. A few years later thanks to a loan from the Inter-American Development Bank, the institute moved to its current main campus in Dulce Nombre district.

In 2009 the institute began offering bachelor's degrees in Computer Engineering and Information Technology Administration. In 2011 TEC invested over $1 million in equipment, infrastructure and personnel related to nanotechnology.

On 25 May 2023 María Estrada Sánchez was elected as the first female rector of the institution.

=== Name change ===
For promotional and communication purposes, the institution changed its name and manual of identity from Instituto Tecnológico de Costa Rica (ITCR) to be recognized just as Tecnológico de Costa Rica (TEC), on 26 October 2009, by Ordinary Session Nº2635, Article 11.

While the legal name of the institution is still Instituto Tecnológico de Costa Rica, it should be known in Spanish, as stated by the institution's identity manual, as just the "Tecnológico de Costa Rica", however in English, the identity manual states that due to published research works, the name should be Costa Rica Institute of Technology.

== Campuses ==
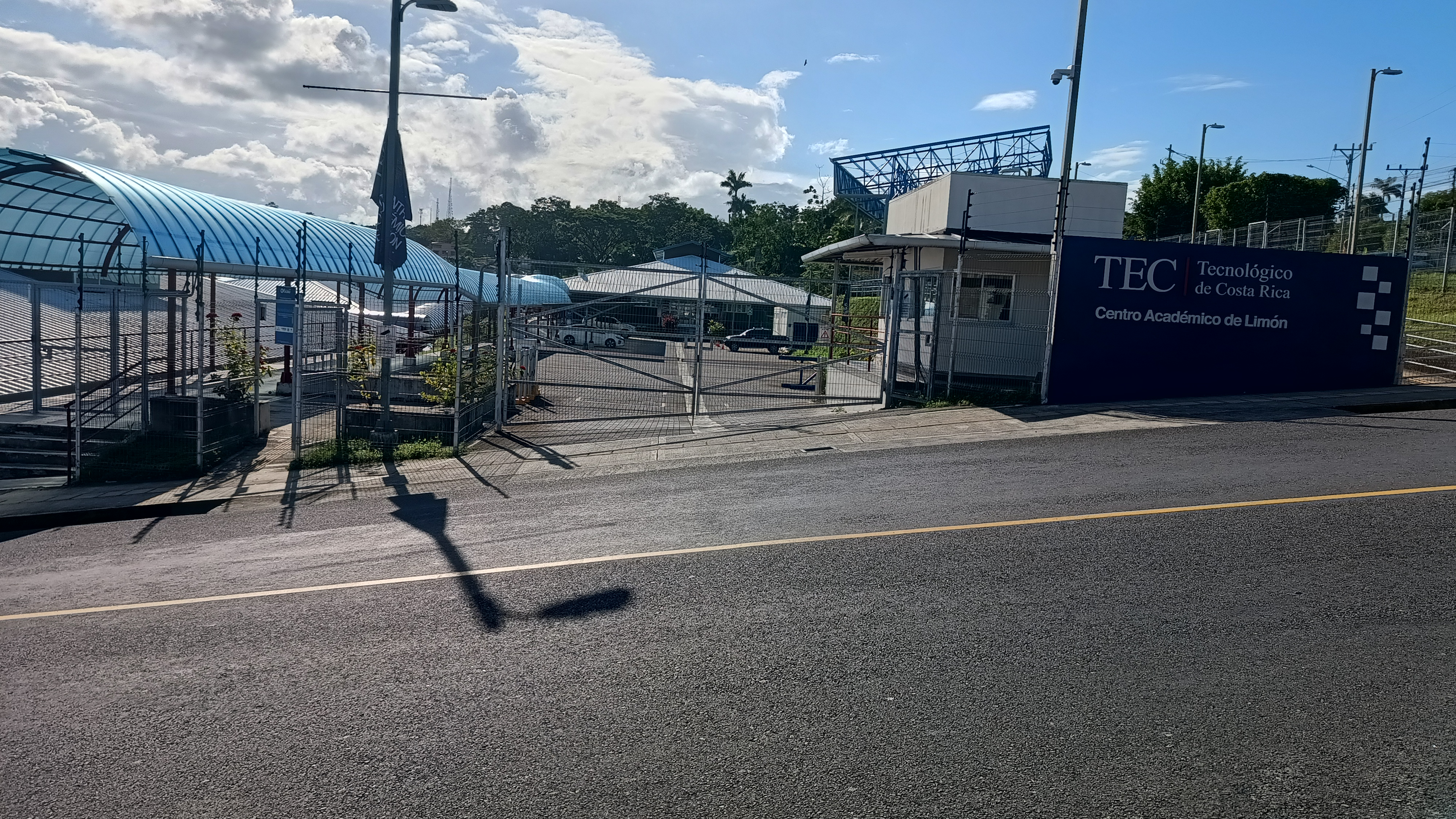
Regional campus in Limón

The main campus is located in the outskirts of downtown Cartago, in Dulce Nombre district. There are regional campuses located in Santa Clara, San Carlos, downtown San José, near downtown Alajuela and Limon.
