= Cartago railway station =

Railway station in Costa Rica

Cartago Station Estación de Cartago
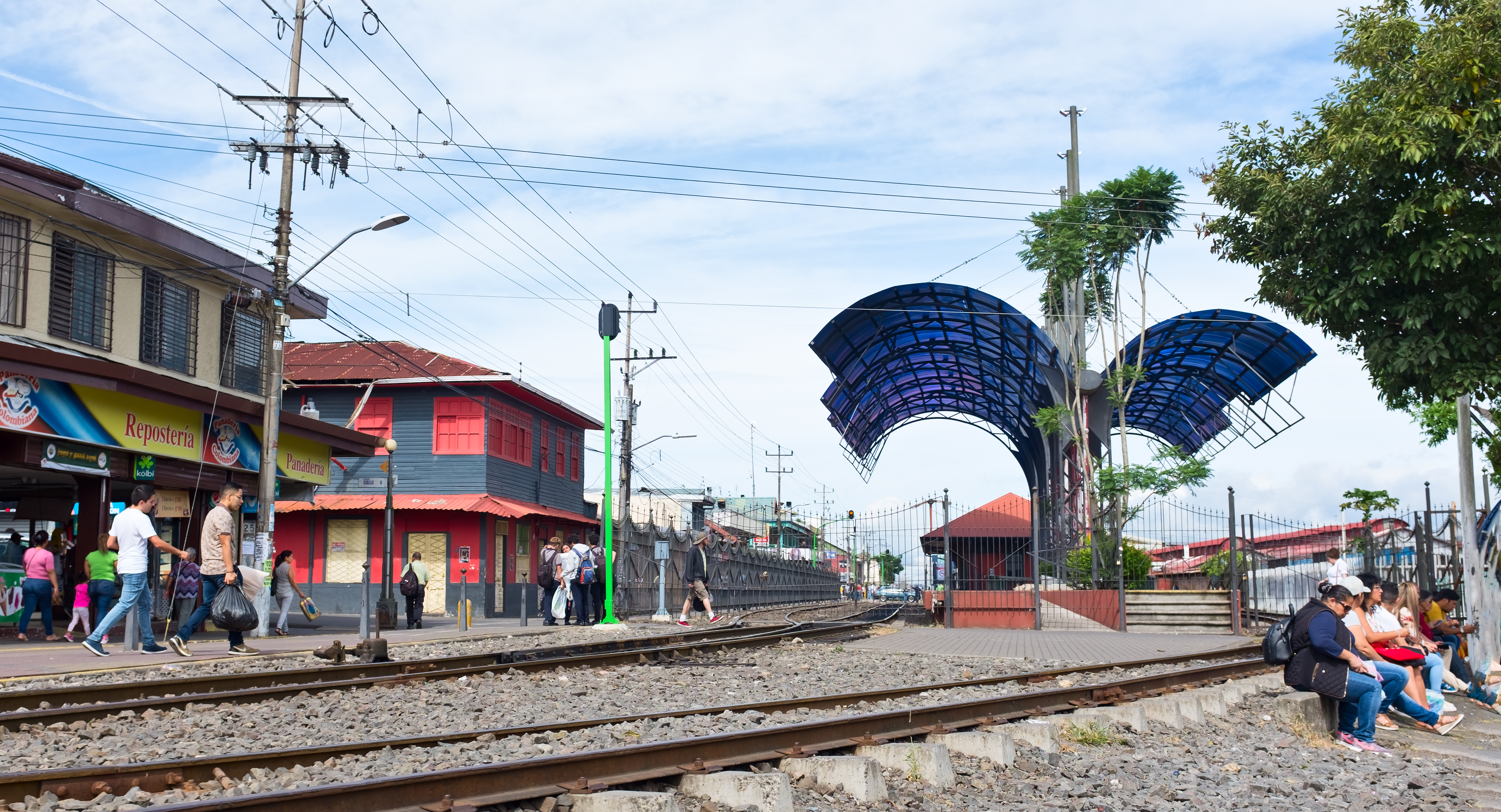
- Cartago station in the background, with platforms, seen from the west end.

General information
- Location: Calle 4 and 6, Avenida 3 Occidental district, Cartago canton, Cartago province Costa Rica
- Coordinates: 9.86656°N 83.92202°W
- Operator: Incofer
- Line: Interurbano
Location

Cartago Station is a railway station managed by Incofer and located in Occidental district, in the Cartago canton of the Cartago province.

== Adjacent stations ==
To the north of the station is the bus stop to San José, managed by LUMACA.
