= San Isidro District, El Guarco =

District in El Guarco canton, Cartago province, Costa Rica

San Isidro
- District
- San Isidro district
- San Isidro district location in Costa Rica
- Coordinates: 9.7245791°N 83.8897822°W
- Country: Costa Rica
- Province: Cartago
- Canton: El Guarco

Area
  - Total: 134.73 km^{2} (52.02 sq mi)
- Elevation: 1,388 m (4,554 ft)

Population (2011)
  - Total: 9,828
  - Density: 72.95/km^{2} (188.9/sq mi)
- Time zone: UTC−06:00
- Postal code: 30802

San Isidro is a district of the El Guarco canton, in the Cartago province of Costa Rica.

== Geography ==
San Isidro has an area of 134.73 km^{2} and an elevation of 1,388 metres.

== Locations ==
- Barrios (neighborhoods): Guatuso, Higuito, Potrerillos
- Poblados (villages): Altamiradas, Alto San Francisco, Bajo Gloria, Bajos de León, Barrancas (part), Cangreja, Cañón (part), Casablanca, Casamata, Cascajal, Conventillo, Cruces, Cruz, Chonta (part), Damita, Dos Amigos, Empalme (part), Esperanza, Estrella, Guayabal (part), La Luchita, La Paz, Macho Gaff, Montserrat, Ojo de Agua (part), Palmital, Palmital Sur, Palo Verde, Paso Macho (part), Purires (part), Salsipuedes (part), San Cayetano, Surtubal, Tres de Junio, Vara del Roble

== Demographics ==
Historical population
Census	Pop.	±% p.a.
1950	2,289	—
1963	3,788	+3.95%
1973	5,081	+2.98%
1984	6,287	+1.96%
2000	9,165	+2.38%
2011	9,828	+0.64%
2022	11,660	+1.57%
Source: Instituto Nacional de Estadística y Censos; Centro Centroamericano de Población

For the 2011 census, San Isidro had a population of 9,828 inhabitants.

== Transportation ==
=== Road transportation ===
The district is covered by the following road routes:

- National Route 2
- National Route 222
- National Route 226
- National Route 315
- National Route 406
