= Corralillo District =

District in Cartago province, Costa Rica

Corralillo
- District
- Interactive map of Corralillo
- Corralillo district location in Costa Rica
- Coordinates: 9.7899123°N 84.0499801°W
- Country: Costa Rica
- Province: Cartago
- Canton: Cartago

Area
  - Total: 32.57 km^{2} (12.58 sq mi)
- Elevation: 1,665 m (5,463 ft)

Population (2011)
  - Total: 10,647
  - Density: 326.9/km^{2} (846.7/sq mi)
- Time zone: UTC−06:00
- Postal code: 30107

Corralillo is a district of the Cartago canton, in the Cartago province of Costa Rica.

== Geography ==
Corralillo has an area of 32.57 km^{2} (12.58 sq mi) and an elevation of 1,665 metres.

== Demographics ==
Historical population
Census	Pop.	±% p.a.
1883	458	—
1927	2,337	+3.77%
1950	2,686	+0.61%
1963	4,627	+4.27%
1973	5,928	+2.51%
1984	6,538	+0.89%
2000	9,366	+2.27%
2011	10,647	+1.17%
2022	13,153	+1.94%
Source: Instituto Nacional de Estadística y Censos; Centro Centroamericano de Población

For the 2011 census, Corralillo had a population of 10,647 inhabitants.

== Transportation ==
=== Road transportation ===
The district is covered by the following road routes:

- National Route 222
- National Route 228
- National Route 304
- National Route 406
- National Route 407
