= National Route 405 (Costa Rica) =

National Road Route in Costa Rica

National Tertiary Route 405
- Ruta nacional terciaria 405

Route information
- Maintained by Ministry of Public Works and Transport
- Length: 14.210 km (8.830 mi)

Location
- Country: Costa Rica
- Provinces: Cartago

Highway system
- National Road Network of Costa Rica
← Route 404	→ Route 406

National Tertiary Route 405, or just Route 405 (Spanish: Ruta Nacional Terciaria 405, or Ruta 405) is a National Road Route of Costa Rica, located in the Cartago province.

== Description ==
In Cartago province the route covers Cartago canton (Aguacaliente, Dulce Nombre districts), Paraíso canton (Orosi district).
