= Aguacaliente =

District in Cartago canton, Cartago province, Costa Rica

- District
- Interactive map of Aguacaliente
- Aguacaliente district location in Costa Rica
- Coordinates: 9°43′50″N 83°51′37″W
- Country: Costa Rica
- Province: Cartago
- Canton: Cartago

Area
  - Total: 100.37 km^{2} (38.75 sq mi)
- Elevation: 1,330 m (4,360 ft)

Population (2011)
  - Total: 31,789
  - Density: 316.72/km^{2} (820.30/sq mi)
- Time zone: UTC−06:00
- Postal code: 30105

Aguacaliente, also known as San Francisco, is a district of the Cartago canton in the Cartago province of Costa Rica.

== Geography ==
Aguacaliente has an area of 100.37 km^{2} (38.75 sq mi) and an elevation of 1,330 metres.

== Demographics ==
Historical population
Census	Pop.	±% p.a.
1883	1,875	—
1892	2,337	+2.48%
1927	1,174	−1.95%
1950	1,803	+1.88%
1963	2,796	+3.43%
1973	5,184	+6.37%
1984	8,963	+5.10%
2000	28,516	+7.50%
2011	31,789	+0.99%
2022	32,351	+0.16%
Source: Instituto Nacional de Estadística y Censos; Centro Centroamericano de Población

For the 2011 census, Aguacaliente had a population of 31,789 inhabitants.

== Transportation ==
=== Road transportation ===
The district is covered by the following road routes:

- National Route 2
- National Route 231
- National Route 405
