= San Nicolás District, Cartago =

District in Cartago canton, Cartago province, Costa Rica

San Nicolás
- District
- San Nicolás district
- San Nicolás district location in Costa Rica
- Coordinates: 9.897072°N 83.9441678°W
- Country: Costa Rica
- Province: Cartago
- Canton: Cartago

Area
  - Total: 29.44 km^{2} (11.37 sq mi)
- Elevation: 1,445 m (4,741 ft)

Population (2011)
  - Total: 25,948
  - Density: 881.4/km^{2} (2,283/sq mi)
- Time zone: UTC−06:00
- Postal code: 30104

San Nicolás is a district of the Cartago canton, in the Cartago province of Costa Rica.

== Geography ==
San Nicolás has an area of 29.44 km^{2} and an elevation of 1,445 metres.

== Demographics ==
Historical population
Census	Pop.	±% p.a.
1864	2,229	—
1883	2,002	−0.56%
1892	2,764	+3.65%
1927	2,787	+0.02%
1950	3,620	+1.14%
1963	5,705	+3.56%
1973	9,384	+5.10%
1984	14,675	+4.15%
2000	22,193	+2.62%
2011	25,948	+1.43%
2022	28,544	+0.87%
Source: Instituto Nacional de Estadística y Censos; Centro Centroamericano de Población

For the 2011 census, San Nicolás had a population of 25,948 inhabitants.

== Transportation ==
=== Road transportation ===
The district is covered by the following road routes:

- National Route 2
- National Route 10
- National Route 218
- National Route 219
- National Route 236

=== Rail transportation ===
The Interurbano Line operated by Incofer goes through this district.
