= Carmen District =

Carmen District may refer to:

- Carmen District, San José, in San José Canton, San José Province, Costa Rica
- Carmen District, Cartago, in Cartago Canton, Cartago Province, Costa Rica
