= National Route 231 (Costa Rica) =

National Road Route in Costa Rica

National Secondary Route 231
- Ruta nacional secundaria 231

Route information
- Maintained by Ministry of Public Works and Transport
- Length: 4.750 km (2.952 mi)

Location
- Country: Costa Rica
- Provinces: Cartago

Highway system
- National Road Network of Costa Rica
← Route 230	→ Route 232

National Secondary Route 231, or just Route 231 (Spanish: Ruta Nacional Secundaria 231, or Ruta 231) is a National Road Route of Costa Rica, located in the Cartago province.

== Description ==
In Cartago province the route covers Cartago canton (Oriental and Aguacaliente districts).
