= National Route 406 (Costa Rica) =

National Road Route in Costa Rica

National Tertiary Route 406
- Ruta nacional terciaria 406

Route information
- Maintained by Ministry of Public Works and Transport
- Length: 10.860 km (6.748 mi)

Location
- Country: Costa Rica
- Provinces: San José, Cartago

Highway system
- National Road Network of Costa Rica
← Route 405	→ Route 407

National Tertiary Route 406, or just Route 406 (Spanish: Ruta Nacional Terciaria 406, or Ruta 406) is a National Road Route of Costa Rica, located in the San José and Cartago provinces.

== Description ==
In San José province the route covers Desamparados canton (San Cristóbal district).

In Cartago province the route covers Cartago canton (Corralillo district), El Guarco canton (San Isidro district).
