= National Route 236 (Costa Rica) =

National Road Route in Costa Rica

National Secondary Route 236
- Ruta nacional secundaria 236

Route information
- Maintained by Ministry of Public Works and Transport
- Length: 4.130 km (2.566 mi)

Location
- Country: Costa Rica
- Provinces: Cartago

Highway system
- National Road Network of Costa Rica
← Route 235	→ Route 237

National Secondary Route 236, or just Route 236 (Spanish: Ruta Nacional Secundaria 236, or Ruta 236) is a National Road Route of Costa Rica, located in the Cartago province.

== Description ==
In Cartago province the route covers Cartago canton (San Nicolás and Guadalupe districts) and El Guarco canton (Tejar district).
