= National Route 401 (Costa Rica) =

National Road Route in Costa Rica

National Tertiary Route 401
- Ruta nacional terciaria 401

Route information
- Maintained by Ministry of Public Works and Transport
- Length: 5.445 km (3.383 mi)

Location
- Country: Costa Rica
- Provinces: Cartago

Highway system
- National Road Network of Costa Rica
← Route 336	→ Route 402

National Tertiary Route 401, or just Route 401 (Spanish: Ruta Nacional Terciaria 401, or Ruta 401) is a National Road Route of Costa Rica, located in the Cartago province.

== Description ==
In Cartago province the route covers Cartago canton (Tierra Blanca and Llano Grande districts) and Oreamuno canton (Potrero Cerrado district).
