= National Route 10 (Costa Rica) =

National Road Route in Costa Rica

National Primary Route 10
- Ruta nacional primaria 10

Route information
- Maintained by Ministry of Public Works and Transport
- Length: 90.405 km (56.175 mi)

Location
- Country: Costa Rica
- Provinces: Cartago, Limón

Highway system
- National Road Network of Costa Rica
← Route 6	→ Route 14

National Primary Route 10, or just Route 10 (Spanish: Ruta Nacional Primaria 10, or Ruta 10) is a National Road Route of Costa Rica located in Cartago and Limón provinces.

== Description ==
In Cartago province the route covers Cartago canton (Oriental, Occidental, San Nicolás, Guadalupe, and Dulce Nombre districts), Paraíso canton (Paraíso, Santiago, Llanos de Santa Lucía, and Birrisito districts), Jiménez canton (Juan Viñas district), Turrialba canton (Turrialba, Pavones, and Tres Equis districts), Alvarado canton (Cervantes and Capellades districts), and Oreamuno canton (San Rafael district).

In Limón province the route covers Siquirres canton (Siquirres district).
