= National Route 228 (Costa Rica) =

National Road Route in Costa Rica

National Secondary Route 228
- Ruta nacional secundaria 228

Route information
- Maintained by Ministry of Public Works and Transport
- Length: 26.585 km (16.519 mi)

Location
- Country: Costa Rica
- Provinces: Cartago

Highway system
- National Road Network of Costa Rica
← Route 227	→ Route 229

National Secondary Route 228, or just Route 228 (Spanish: Ruta Nacional Secundaria 228, or Ruta 228) is a National Road Route of Costa Rica, located in the Cartago province.

== Description ==
In Cartago province the route covers Cartago canton (Occidental, Guadalupe, Corralillo, and Quebradilla districts) and El Guarco canton (Tejar and Tobosi districts).
