= National Route 233 (Costa Rica) =

National Road Route in Costa Rica

National Secondary Route 233
- Ruta nacional secundaria 233

Route information
- Maintained by Ministry of Public Works and Transport
- Length: 2.450 km (1.522 mi)

Location
- Country: Costa Rica
- Provinces: Cartago

Highway system
- National Road Network of Costa Rica
← Route 232	→ Route 234

National Secondary Route 233, or just Route 233 (Spanish: Ruta Nacional Secundaria 233, or Ruta 233) is a National Road Route of Costa Rica, located in the Cartago province.

== Description ==
In Cartago province the route covers Cartago canton (Oriental district) and Oreamuno canton (San Rafael district).
