= National Route 407 (Costa Rica) =

National Road Route in Costa Rica

National Tertiary Route 407
- Ruta nacional terciaria 407

Route information
- Maintained by Ministry of Public Works and Transport
- Length: 6.850 km (4.256 mi)

Location
- Country: Costa Rica
- Provinces: Cartago

Highway system
- National Road Network of Costa Rica
← Route 406	→ Route 408

National Tertiary Route 407, or just Route 407 (Spanish: Ruta Nacional Terciaria 407, or Ruta 407) is a National Road Route of Costa Rica, located in the Cartago province.

== Description ==
In Cartago province the route covers Cartago canton (Corralillo, Quebradilla districts).
