= Llano Grande District =

District in Cartago canton, Cartago province, Costa Rica

Llano Grande
- District
- Interactive map of Llano Grande
- Llano Grande district location in Costa Rica
- Coordinates: 9.9337234°N 83.9193976°W
- Country: Costa Rica
- Province: Cartago
- Canton: Cartago
- Creation: 10 January 1938

Area
  - Total: 30.35 km^{2} (11.72 sq mi)
- Elevation: 2,270 m (7,450 ft)

Population (2011)
  - Total: 4,342
  - Density: 143.1/km^{2} (370.5/sq mi)
- Time zone: UTC−06:00
- Postal code: 30110

Llano Grande is a district of the Cartago canton, in the Cartago province of Costa Rica.

== History ==
Llano Grande was created on 10 January 1938 by Decreto Ejecutivo 11.

== Geography ==
Llano Grande has an area of 30.35 km^{2} (11.72 sq mi) and an elevation of 2,270 metres.

== Demographics ==
Historical population
Census	Pop.	±% p.a.
1950	1,157	—
1963	1,788	+3.40%
1973	1,917	+0.70%
1984	2,288	+1.62%
2000	3,665	+2.99%
2011	4,342	+1.55%
2022	4,859	+1.03%
Source: Instituto Nacional de Estadística y Censos; Centro Centroamericano de Población

For the 2011 census, Llano Grande had a population of 4,342 inhabitants.

== Transportation ==
=== Road transportation ===
The district is covered by the following road routes:

- National Route 218
- National Route 401
