= Tejar =

Tejar may refer to:

- El Tejar, Chimaltenango, a municipality in the Chimaltenango department of Guatemala
- El Tejar del Guarco, or Tejar de El Guarco, the capital city of the El Guarco Canton, in the province of Cartago in Costa Rica
- Cimanes del Tejar, a municipality in the province of León, Castile and León, Spain
