= Patio de Agua =

District in El Guarco canton, Cartago province, Costa Rica

- District
- Patio de Agua district
- Patio de Agua district location in Costa Rica
- Coordinates: 9.792777°N 84.0094644°W
- Country: Costa Rica
- Province: Cartago
- Canton: El Guarco

Area
  - Total: 11.05 km^{2} (4.27 sq mi)
- Elevation: 1,960 m (6,430 ft)

Population (2011)
  - Total: 412
  - Density: 37.3/km^{2} (96.6/sq mi)
- Time zone: UTC−06:00
- Postal code: 30804

Patio de Agua is a district of the El Guarco canton, in the Cartago province of Costa Rica.

== Geography ==
Patio de Agua has an area of 11.05 square kilometres (4.27 sq mi) and an elevation of 1,960 metres (6,430 ft).

== Locations ==
- Poblados (villages): Bajo Zopilote, Caragral, Común

== Demographics ==
Historical population
Census	Pop.	±% p.a.
1950	270	—
1963	315	+1.19%
1973	339	+0.74%
1984	529	+4.13%
2000	557	+0.32%
2011	412	−2.70%
2022	488	+1.55%
Source: Instituto Nacional de Estadística y Censos; Centro Centroamericano de Población

For the 2011 census, Patio de Agua had a population of 412 inhabitants.
