= Dulce Nombre District, Cartago =

District in Cartago canton, Cartago province, Costa Rica

Dulce Nombre
- District
- Interactive map of Dulce Nombre
- Dulce Nombre district location in Costa Rica
- Coordinates: 9.7313703°N 83.8402067°W
- Country: Costa Rica
- Province: Cartago
- Canton: Cartago
- Creation: 12 November 1925

Area
  - Total: 33.11 km^{2} (12.78 sq mi)
- Elevation: 1,340 m (4,400 ft)

Population (2011)
  - Total: 10,548
  - Density: 318.6/km^{2} (825.1/sq mi)
- Time zone: UTC−06:00
- Postal code: 30109

Dulce Nombre is a district of the Cartago canton, in the Cartago province of Costa Rica.

== History ==
Dulce Nombre was created on 12 November 1925 by Acuerdo 605.

== Geography ==
Dulce Nombre has an area of 33.11 km^{2} (12.78 sq mi) and an elevation of 1,340 metres.

== Demographics ==
Historical population
Census	Pop.	±% p.a.
1927	1,058	—
1950	1,350	+1.07%
1963	2,052	+3.27%
1973	3,351	+5.03%
1984	4,733	+3.19%
2000	6,508	+2.01%
2011	10,548	+4.49%
2022	16,559	+4.19%
Source: Instituto Nacional de Estadística y Censos; Centro Centroamericano de Población

For the 2011 census, Dulce Nombre had a population of 10,548 inhabitants.

== Culture ==
Important research and education institutions are located in this district:

- The main campus of the Costa Rica Institute of Technology.
- Lankester Botanical Garden (named after British biologist Charles Lankester).

== Transportation ==
=== Road transportation ===
The district is covered by the following road routes:

- National Route 2
- National Route 10
- National Route 405
