= Carmen District, Cartago =

District in Cartago province, Costa Rica

Carmen
- District
- Interactive map of Carmen
- Carmen district location in Costa Rica
- Coordinates: 9.8814997°N 83.9157244°W
- Country: Costa Rica
- Province: Cartago
- Canton: Cartago

Area
  - Total: 4.39 km^{2} (1.69 sq mi)
- Elevation: 1,515 m (4,970 ft)

Population (2011)
  - Total: 17,425
  - Density: 3,970/km^{2} (10,300/sq mi)
- Time zone: UTC−06:00
- Postal code: 30103

Carmen is a district of the Cartago canton, in the Cartago province of Costa Rica.

== Geography ==
Carmen has an area of 4.39 km^{2} (1.69 sq mi) and an elevation of 1,515 metres.

== Demographics ==
Historical population
Census	Pop.	±% p.a.
1864	1,547	—
1883	1,730	+0.59%
1892	2,054	+1.93%
1927	2,758	+0.85%
1950	2,442	−0.53%
1963	4,241	+4.34%
1973	7,392	+5.71%
1984	11,997	+4.50%
2000	15,980	+1.81%
2011	17,425	+0.79%
2022	19,265	+0.92%
Source: Instituto Nacional de Estadística y Censos; Centro Centroamericano de Población

For the 2011 census, Carmen had a population of 17,425 inhabitants.

== Transportation ==
=== Road transportation ===
The district is covered by the following road routes:

- National Route 219
