= Provincial Integration Party Three =

Provincial Integration Party Three Partido Integración Provincial Tres

Party flag

Provincial Integration Party Three (Spanish: Partido Integración Provincial Tres) is a political party in Cartago, Costa Rica. The party was founded and recognized in 2003. Party president is Isabel Cristina Arias Calderón, and the party secretary José Abel Bonilla Castillo.
