= Occidental District =

District in Cartago canton, Cartago province, Costa Rica

Occidental
- District
- Occidental district
- Occidental district location in Costa Rica
- Coordinates: 9.8626528°N 83.927722°W
- Country: Costa Rica
- Province: Cartago
- Canton: Cartago

Area
  - Total: 2 km^{2} (0.77 sq mi)
- Elevation: 1,435 m (4,708 ft)

Population (2011)
  - Total: 9,901
  - Density: 5,000/km^{2} (13,000/sq mi)
- Time zone: UTC−06:00
- Postal code: 30102

Occidental is a district of the Cartago canton in the Cartago province of Costa Rica.

== Geography ==
Occidental has an area of 2 km^{2} (0.77 sq mi) and an elevation of 1,435 metres.

== Demographics ==
Historical population
Census	Pop.	±% p.a.
1927	3,690	—
1950	5,503	+1.75%
1963	7,740	+2.66%
1973	8,264	+0.66%
1984	9,500	+1.28%
2000	11,139	+1.00%
2011	9,901	−1.07%
2022	10,674	+0.69%
Source: Instituto Nacional de Estadística y Censos; Centro Centroamericano de Población

For the 2011 census, Occidental had a population of 9,901 inhabitants.

== Transportation ==
=== Road transportation ===
The district is covered by the following road routes:

- National Route 10
- National Route 228

=== Rail transportation ===
The Interurbano Line operated by Incofer goes through this district. The staffed Cartago railway station is located in this district.
