= Guadalupe District, Cartago =

District in Cartago canton, Cartago province, Costa Rica

Guadalupe
- District
- Interactive map of Guadalupe
- Guadalupe district location in Costa Rica
- Coordinates: 9.8653962°N 83.9568876°W
- Country: Costa Rica
- Province: Cartago
- Canton: Cartago

Area
  - Total: 13.28 km^{2} (5.13 sq mi)
- Elevation: 1,400 m (4,600 ft)

Population (2011)
  - Total: 14,618
  - Density: 1,101/km^{2} (2,851/sq mi)
- Time zone: UTC−06:00
- Postal code: 30106

Guadalupe, also known as Arenilla, is a district of the Cartago canton, in the Cartago province of Costa Rica.

== Geography ==
Guadalupe has an area of 13.28 km^{2} and an elevation of 1,400 metres.

== Demographics ==
Historical population
Census	Pop.	±% p.a.
1864	1,585	—
1883	2,096	+1.48%
1892	2,036	−0.32%
1927	2,151	+0.16%
1950	2,942	+1.37%
1963	5,145	+4.39%
1973	7,745	+4.18%
1984	8,066	+0.37%
2000	12,515	+2.78%
2011	14,618	+1.42%
2022	14,182	−0.27%
Source: Instituto Nacional de Estadística y Censos; Centro Centroamericano de Población

For the 2011 census, Guadalupe had a population of 14,618 inhabitants.

== Transportation ==
=== Road transportation ===
The district is covered by the following road routes:

- National Route 2
- National Route 10
- National Route 228
- National Route 236
