= Oriental District =

District in Cartago canton, Cartago province, Costa Rica

Oriental
- District
- Oriental district
- Oriental district location in Costa Rica
- Coordinates: 9.8609457°N 83.9152618°W
- Country: Costa Rica
- Province: Cartago
- Canton: Cartago

Area
  - Total: 2.04 km^{2} (0.79 sq mi)
- Elevation: 1,435 m (4,708 ft)

Population (2011)
  - Total: 12,228
  - Density: 5,990/km^{2} (15,500/sq mi)
- Time zone: UTC−06:00
- Postal code: 30101

Oriental is a district of the Cartago canton, in the Cartago province of Costa Rica.

== Geography ==
Oriental has an area of 2.04 km^{2} (0.79 sq mi) and an elevation of 1,435 metres.

== Demographics ==
Historical population
Census	Pop.	±% p.a.
1864	2,930	—
1883	4,446	+2.22%
1927	5,648	+0.55%
1950	7,441	+1.21%
1963	10,344	+2.57%
1973	13,489	+2.69%
1984	14,428	+0.61%
2000	12,839	−0.73%
2011	12,228	−0.44%
2022	11,079	−0.89%
Source: Instituto Nacional de Estadística y Censos; Centro Centroamericano de Población

For the 2011 census, Oriental had a population of 12,228 inhabitants.

== Transportation ==
=== Road transportation ===
The district is covered by the following road routes:

- National Route 10
- National Route 231
- National Route 233

=== Rail transportation ===
The Interurbano Line operated by Incofer goes through this district. An unmanned platform stop is located at the northwest, near the Basilica.
