= Jorge Allende =

Chilean biochemist and biophysicist

Jorge E. Allende
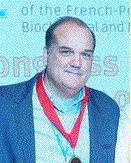
- Jorge E. Allende in Barcelona, 2017
- Born: 11 November 1934 (age 91); Cartago, Costa Rica
- Education: Louisiana State University Yale University Rockefeller University
- Known for: Protein biosynthesis, Institute of Biomedical Sciences (ICBM) at Universidad de Chile
- Spouse: Catherine Connelly
- Children: 4
- Parents: Octavio Allende Echeverría (father); Amparo Rivera Ortiz (mother)
- Awards: Great Cross of the National Order of Scientific Merit, Brazil, National Prize for Nature Sciences, Chile, The puRkwa Prize
- Scientific career
- Fields: Biochemistry Molecular Biology
- Workplaces: University of Chile National Institutes of Health
- Doctoral advisor: Frederic Richards
- Other academic advisors: Fritz Albert Lipmann Marshall Warren Nirenberg

Jorge Eduardo Allende Rivera (born 11 November 1934) is a Chilean biochemist and biophysicist known for his contributions to the understanding of proteic biosynthesis and how transfer RNA is generated, and the regulation of maturation of amphibian eggs. He has been a foreign associate of the United States National Academy of Sciences since 2001, and was awarded the Chilean National Prize for Nature Sciences (Chile) in 1992.

== Early life ==
Jorge Allende was born in Cartago, Costa Rica, son of Octavio Allende Echeverría, Chilean Consul in the city of Puntarenas, and Amparo Rivera Ortiz, a Costa Rican artist. Because of his father's job as a diplomat, he spent his childhood years between Costa Rica, Chile and the United States. He finished high school in a Jesuit School in New Orleans, Louisiana, where his father was appointed as the Chilean Consul. Subsequently, he studied at Louisiana State University in Baton Rouge, Louisiana. He obtained the Bachelor of Science in chemistry degree in 1957.

== Career ==
He carried out his doctoral studies at Yale University in New Haven, Connecticut, United States, obtaining his Ph.D. in 1961 under the tutorship of Prof. F.M. Richards. He did post doctoral work with Prof. Fritz Lipmann at Rockefeller University and with Marshall Warren Nirenberg at NIH.

During the 1960s, his research was focused on protein synthesis, a field in which he made crucial contributions. In the 1970s he was a pioneer in studying the mechanism of hormonal induction of oocyte maturation. His later research is focused in two ubiquitous protein kinases, CK1 and CK2, involved in the phosphorylation of key cellular proteins.

He devoted much of his life to organizing activities for the scientific integration in Latin America especially through organizing series of training courses in molecular biology techniques, and through the creation of the Latin American Network of Biological Sciences.

In recent years, Doctor Allende has been a promoter of science education through his personal commitment in several projects, like the Science Education Inquiry Based program, funded by the University of Chile, and through his participation in the Allende-Connelly Foundation, founded by him and his wife.

Though he retired from active science in 2009, he remains a professor at the Faculty of Medicine. He was also Research Vice President of the University of Chile. He published his autobiography in 2010.

== Personal life ==
He married Catherine Connelly (also a biochemist) in Holyoke, Massachusetts, On September 16, 1961. He raised a family of four children: Miguel Luis, Juan Ignacio, Jorge Eduardo and Maria Amparo and has 13 grandchildren.

With his wife, Catherine Connelly, he was on sabbatical at the University of California at San Diego, when the 1973 coup in Chile took place. He returned to Chile in May 1974 and was one of the main defenders of the University of Chile's autonomy, endangered by the military intervention in academic life. In December 1975 he co-signed, with other academics, a letter entitled "University under surveillance" opposing military intervention in the University of Chile. The letter was written by philosopher Jorge Millas and published in the newspaper "El Mercurio". The letter was the first appearance of a public statement by a group of academics who criticized the handling of the University of Chile by the military government.

== Awards and distinctions ==
- 2007 - Recipient of the puRkwa Prize. This is an "international prize for the scientific literacy of the children of the planet" awarded annually by the École nationale supérieure des mines de Saint-Étienne and the French Academy of Sciences.
- 2005 - Member of the Academy of Exact, Physical and Natural Sciences of Argentina
- 2002 - Medal of the Grand Cross of the Scientific Merit awarded by the President Brazil.
- 2001 - Foreign Member of the National Academy of Sciences of the United States of America.
- 1993 - Honorary Doctorate from the University of Buenos Aires, Argentina.
- 1992 - National "Natural Sciences Award of Chile".
- 1990 - Foreign Member of the Institute of Medicine of the National Academy of Sciences of the United States of America.
- 1986 to 1988 - "Scholar in Residence" of the Fogarty International Center in the United States.
- 1986 - Founding member of the Academy of Sciences of the Third World.
- 1983 - Member of the Chilean Academy of Sciences.
- 1982 - Founding member of the Academy of Sciences of Latin America.
- 1966 - Guggenheim Fellowship
