= Cartago, Costa Rica =

City in Costa Rica

Cartago
- City
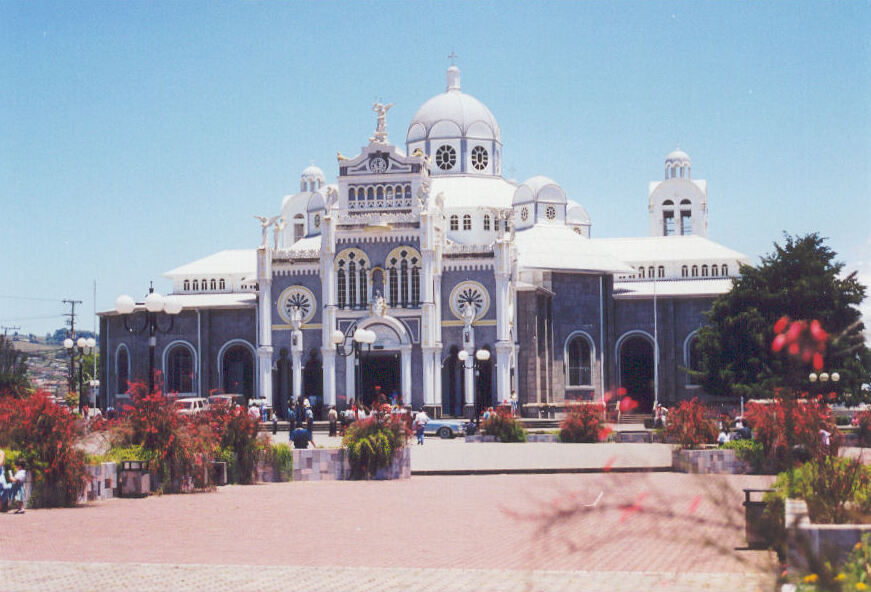
- The Basílica de Nuestra Señora de los Ángeles

- Flag Seal
- Nickname: Ciudad de las Brumas (Spanish) " City of Fogs "
- Motto: Fide et pace (Latin) "Faith and Peace"
- Location in Costa Rica
- Coordinates: 9°52′N 83°55′W
- Country: Costa Rica
- Province: Cartago Province
- Canton: Cartago Canton
- Districts: Oriental, Occidental
- Founded: 1563
- Capital City until: 1823

Government
  - Mayor: Mario Redondo Poveda (ADC)

Area
  - City: 152.68 km^{2} (58.95 sq mi)
- Elevation: 1,435 m (4,708 ft)

Population (2008)
  - City: 156,600
  - Density: 152.68/km^{2} (395.4/sq mi)
  - Metro: 413,505
- Time zone: UTC-6 (Central Standard Time)
- Climate: Cwb
- Patron saint: Saint James the Greater
- Website: www.muni-carta.go.cr
- HDI (2018) 0.828 – high

Cartago (Spanish pronunciation: [kaɾˈtaɣo]) is the head city of Cartago canton of the Cartago Province, and is composed of the Oriental and Occidental districts as stated in the administrative divisions of Costa Rica. It was the capital of Costa Rica from 1574 to 1824.

== History ==
Founded in 1563 by Juan Vasquez de Coronado, it was the first successful establishment in Costa Rica. The city was granted a coat of arms by King Philip II of Spain in 1565, and the title of Muy Noble y Muy Leal ("Very Noble and Very Loyal") by the Cortes (Spanish Parliament) in 1814. It served as the first capital of Costa Rica until 1823, when Republican leader Gregorio José Ramírez, moved the capital to the bigger city of San José, because Cartago wanted to unite the newly independent province of Costa Rica to the Iturbide's Mexican Empire while San Jose and Alajuela supported a Republican system.

The city was severely damaged by major earthquakes in 1822, 1841 and 1910. In 1963, a volcanic eruption of Irazu Volcano which for two years covered San José in ash badly damaged some agricultural areas around Cartago, but not the city.

Many pilgrims come to Cartago annually, to visit the nation's principal church, the enormous Basílica de Nuestra Señora de los Ángeles, on the feast day of the Virgin of the Angels (August 2). The church has a statue of a Black Madonna known as La Negrita, who supposedly had great healing powers. The sick come to her statue in hope of a miracle from La Negrita.

According to folklore in Costa Rica, the statue was found by an indigenous girl in 1635. But, in reality, the only inhabitants were black and mulatto slaves who lived in a village named La Puebla, away from the white masters in Cartago. The legend says that she brought the statue home several times, but it mysteriously reappeared at its original site. The rock where she found it is now kept in a backroom in the basilica and is revered as a sacred relic and object of inspiration. The rock is supposed to be in the same location it was when La Negrita was found, but it has been moved as the basilica was rebuilt (see below). It is common for pilgrims to touch the rock in reverence.

The Plaza Mayor in Cartago includes the Santiago Apóstol Parish Ruins, about seven blocks west from the basilica. Despite their beauty, they are not real ruins but an unfinished building, which was badly damaged by the 1910 earthquake and then interrupted. The city's government is declaring 100 blocks as Cartago's "historical center." This is a way to keep the historical buildings alive in the future, as many cities in the world have done. On the other hand, the government of the city and JASEC (the company that produces and distributes electricity to Cartago and surrounding areas) have been working to light some of the most important historical buildings as a way to attract inhabitants and tourists to the city at night time.

On April 24, 2010 the former "Cuartel de la Ciudad", home of the local police, finally opened after a two-year restoration as the new City Museum. It is located 2 blocks north of the Plaza Mayor.

The Chilean biochemist and biophysicist Jorge Allende was born in Cartago in 1934.

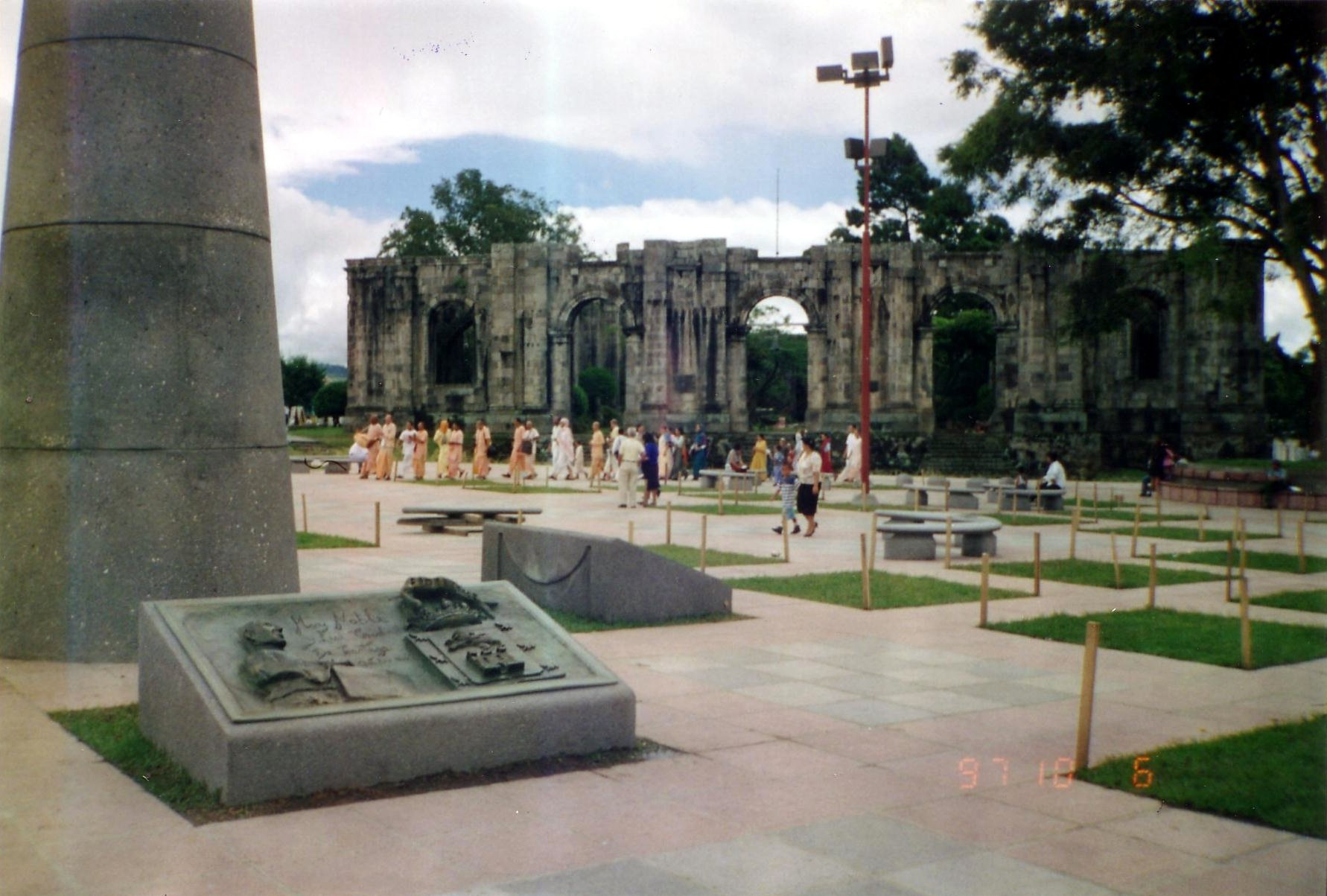
The ruins of the Santiago Apóstol church in Cartago's central park, known as "Plaza Mayor".

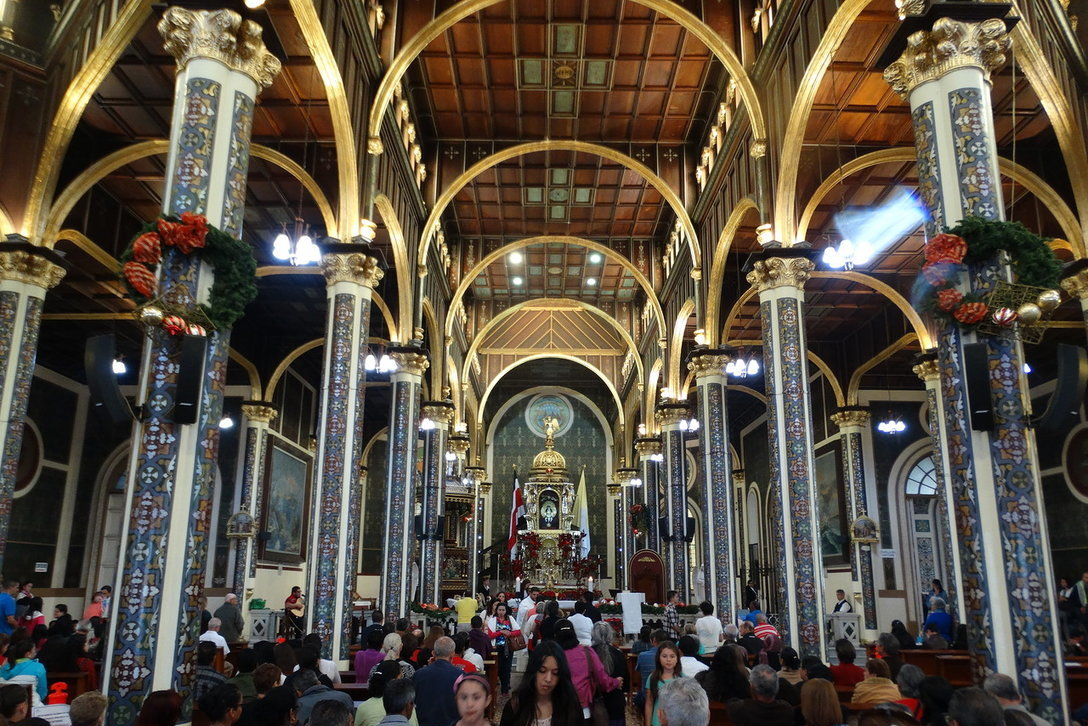
Interior of the Basilica in Cartago

== Economy ==
Agricultural products make up the base of the economy of the rural areas around the city. There is an industrial park where a few Costa Rican and international companies are located. However, a large portion of the locals do not work in the city itself but in San José metropolitan area. Those who do work within the city limits concentrate largely in the service and commerce sectors of the economy.

Cartago is home of the Costa Rica Institute of Technology (TEC), one of the most prestigious higher education institutions in the country and one of Central America's most important engineering schools. It is located in Dulce Nombre district, not far from Los Angeles Basilica.

== Tourism ==
Places tourists often visit in the city include the Basilica of Los Angeles, the "Ruins of Santiago Apostle Church", The City Museum, Maria Auxiliadora church, the Costa Rica Institute of Technology, The Central Market (especially on Thursdays and Saturdays), and the main building of San Luis Gonzaga High School, site of the first Central American Supreme Court. Cultural activities take place at the "Casa de la Ciudad" and the "Casa de la Cultura", as well as in the campus of the Costa Rica Institute of Technology.

The province is known for its rich ecological diversity and dense tropical rainforests along the mountain ranges near the Irazu and Turrialba volcanoes.

== Sports ==
The city's football club is Cartaginés, who have won the Costa Rican league four times. They play their home games at the Estadio José Rafael Fello Meza Ivankovich.

== Geography ==
It has an elevation of 1,435 m (4,708 ft) above sea level, at the base of the Irazú Volcano.

== Climate ==
Cartago has a borderline tropical monsoon climate (Am) and dry winter subtropical highland climate (Cwb). Coinciding with the tropical monsoon classification, it has noticeably cooler weather than most places of this climate type, owing to its high elevation. It has steadily very warm temperatures throughout the year, with heavy rainfall in most months and a short dry season in the winter.

Climate data for Cartago
Month	Jan	Feb	Mar	Apr	May	Jun	Jul	Aug	Sep	Oct	Nov	Dec	Year
Mean daily maximum °C (°F)	24.3 (75.7)	25.1 (77.2)	26.4 (79.5)	26.7 (80.1)	25.8 (78.4)	25.1 (77.2)	24.8 (76.6)	24.8 (76.6)	24.9 (76.8)	24.7 (76.5)	24.4 (75.9)	24.0 (75.2)	25.1 (77.1)
Mean daily minimum °C (°F)	14.6 (58.3)	14.6 (58.3)	14.6 (58.3)	15.0 (59.0)	15.7 (60.3)	15.5 (59.9)	15.7 (60.3)	15.4 (59.7)	15.0 (59.0)	15.1 (59.2)	15.5 (59.9)	15.4 (59.7)	15.2 (59.3)
Average rainfall mm (inches)	20.4 (0.80)	21.7 (0.85)	47.8 (1.88)	110.1 (4.33)	333.1 (13.11)	327.8 (12.91)	199.5 (7.85)	241.6 (9.51)	410.8 (16.17)	424.6 (16.72)	182.4 (7.18)	54.5 (2.15)	2,374.3 (93.46)
Source: Instituto Meteorológico Nacional

== Notable people ==
- Jorge Allende (born 11 November 1934), Chilean biochemist and biophysicist born in Cartago of a Costa Rican mother
- Ringo Cantillo, footballer who represented the United States
- Ana Cardoso, an enslaved woman whose descendants include at least one president and author.

== See also ==
- Cartago Agrarian Union Party
- Provincial Integration Party Three
- Cartago in Spanish
