= El Tejar de El Guarco =

District in El Guarco canton, Cartago province, Costa Rica

El Tejar
- District
- Interactive map of El Tejar
- El Tejar district location in Costa Rica
- Coordinates: 9.8438293°N 83.9513588°W
- Country: Costa Rica
- Province: Cartago
- Canton: El Guarco

Area
  - Total: 6.07 km^{2} (2.34 sq mi)
- Elevation: 1,377 m (4,518 ft)

Population (2011)
  - Total: 24,984
  - Density: 4,120/km^{2} (10,700/sq mi)
- Time zone: UTC−06:00
- Postal code: 30801

El Tejar is a district and the head city of the El Guarco canton, in the Cartago province of Costa Rica.

== Geography ==
El Tejar has an area of 6.07 km^{2} (2.34 sq mi) and an elevation of 1,377 metres.

== Locations ==
- Barrios (neighborhoods): Asunción, Barahona, Barrio Nuevo, Colonia, Chavarría, Sabana, Sabana Grande, San Rafael, Santa Gertrudis, Sauces, Silo, Viento Fresco, Barrio Santo Cristo (BSC)

== Demographics ==
Historical population
Census	Pop.	±% p.a.
1864	1,214	—
1927	4,204	+1.99%
1950	2,647	−1.99%
1963	4,119	+3.46%
1973	6,449	+4.59%
1984	11,158	+5.11%
2000	18,648	+3.26%
2011	24,984	+2.69%
2022	27,582	+0.90%
Source: Instituto Nacional de Estadística y Censos; Centro Centroamericano de Población

For the 2011 census, El Tejar had a population of 24,984 inhabitants.

== Transportation ==
=== Road transportation ===
The district is covered by the following road routes:

- National Route 2
- National Route 228
- National Route 236
