= El Guarco (canton) =

Canton in Cartago province, Costa Rica

- Canton
- Flag
- Interactive map of El Guarco
- El Guarco canton location in Costa Rica
- Coordinates: 9.7310041°N 83.9083096°W
- Country: Costa Rica
- Province: Cartago
- Creation: 26 July 1939
- Head city: Tejar
- Districts: Districts: Tejar; San Isidro; Tobosi; Patio de Agua

Government
  - Type: Municipality
  - Body: Municipalidad de El Guarco

Area
  - Total: 167.69 km^{2} (64.75 sq mi)
- Elevation: 1,526 m (5,007 ft)

Population (2011)
  - Total: 41,793
  - Density: 249.23/km^{2} (645.50/sq mi)
- Time zone: UTC−06:00
- Canton code: 308
- Website: muniguarco.go.cr

El Guarco is a canton in the Cartago province of Costa Rica. The head city is in Tejar district.

== Toponymy ==
The canton is named after El Guarco, a cacique in the colonial era.

== History ==
El Guarco was created on 26 July 1939 by decree 195.

== Geography ==
El Guarco has an area of 167.69 km^{2} and a mean elevation of 1,526 metres.

El Guarco is an elongated canton that stretches southeast from its capital city to encompass a swatch of the Cordillera de Talamanca (Talamanca Mountain Range). The Pan-American Highway, locally designated as Route 2, delineates the canton's lengthy southwestern border.

== Districts ==
The canton of El Guarco is subdivided into the following districts:

1. Tejar
2. San Isidro
3. Tobosi
4. Patio de Agua

== Demographics ==
Historical population
Census	Pop.	±% p.a.
1950	6,385	—
1963	9,689	+3.26%
1973	14,030	+3.77%
1984	20,807	+3.65%
2000	33,788	+3.08%
2011	41,793	+1.95%
2022	47,375	+1.15%
Source: Instituto Nacional de Estadística y Censos; Centro Centroamericano de Población

For the 2011 census, El Guarco had a population of 41,793 inhabitants.

== Transportation ==
=== Road transportation ===
The canton is covered by the following road routes:

- National Route 2
- National Route 222
- National Route 226
- National Route 228
- National Route 236
- National Route 315
- National Route 406
