= Cartago (canton) =

Canton in Cartago province, Costa Rica

- Canton
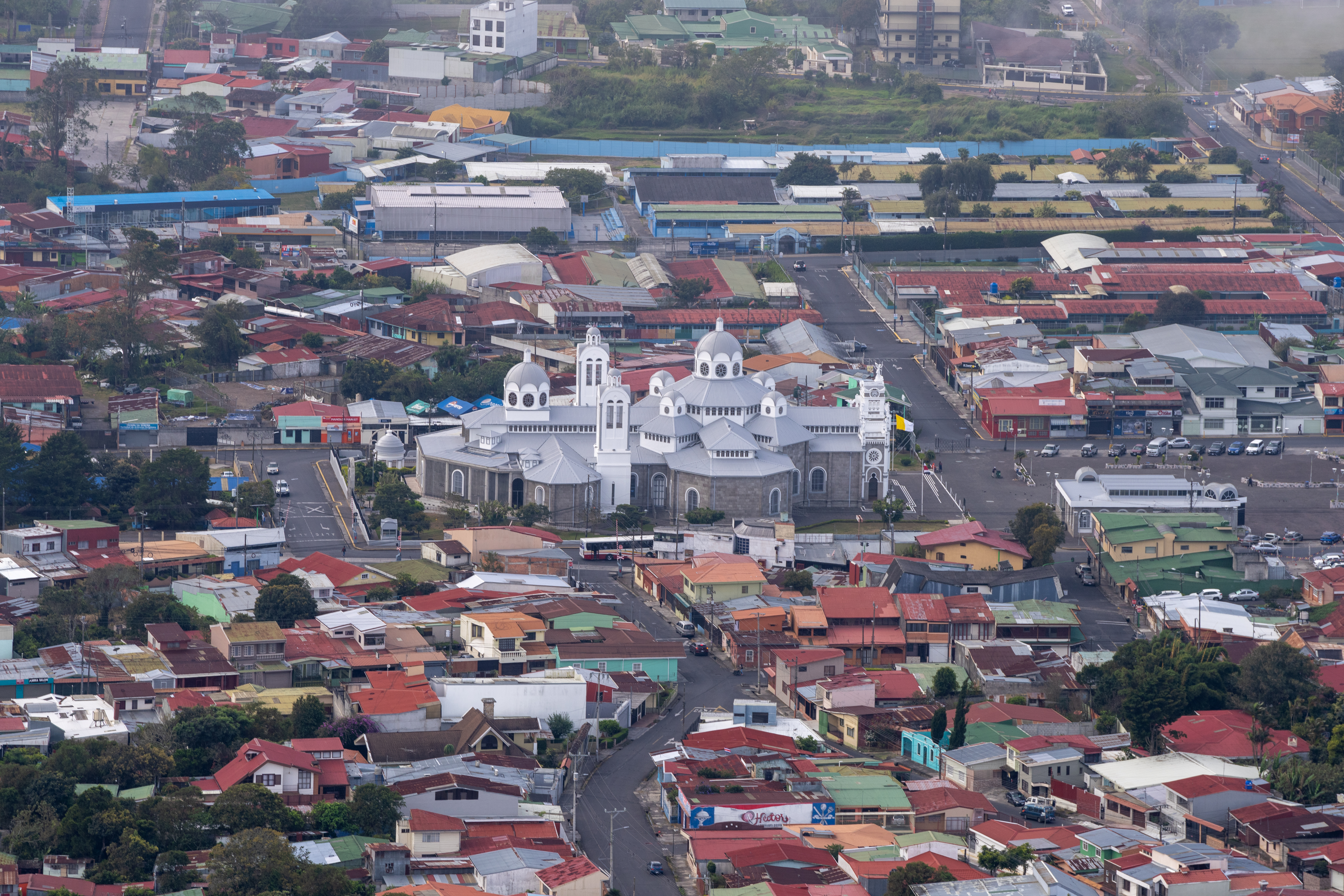
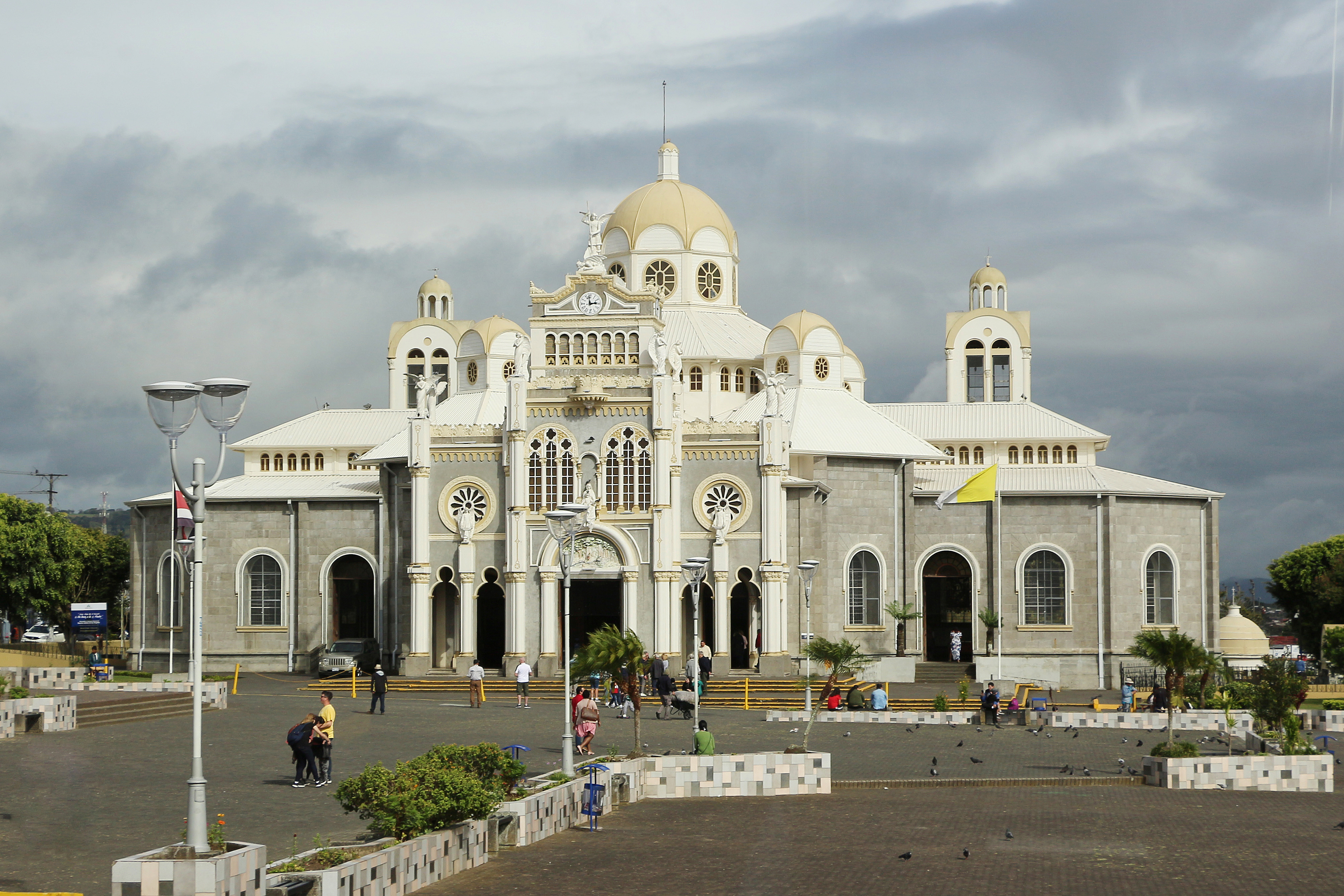
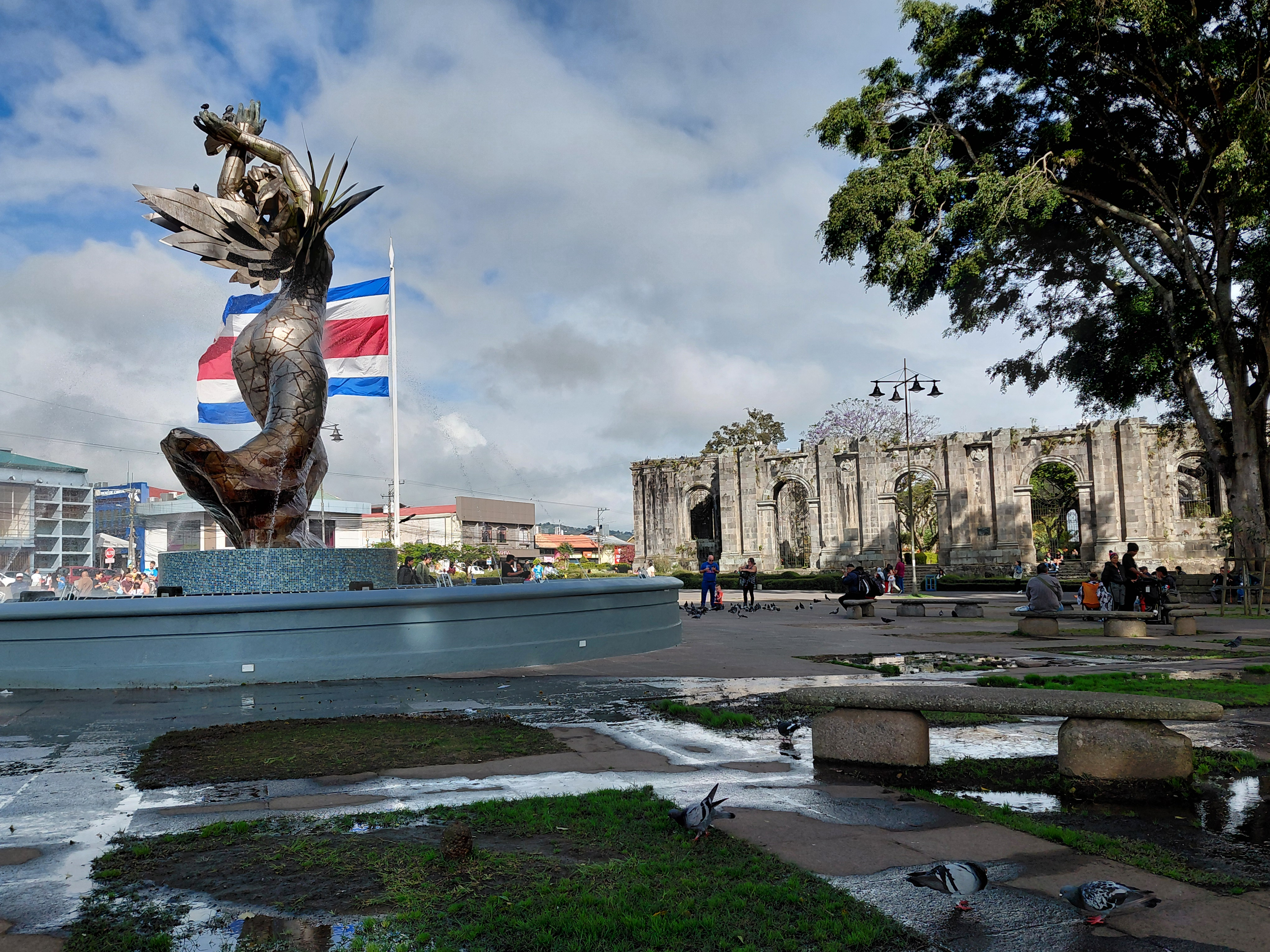
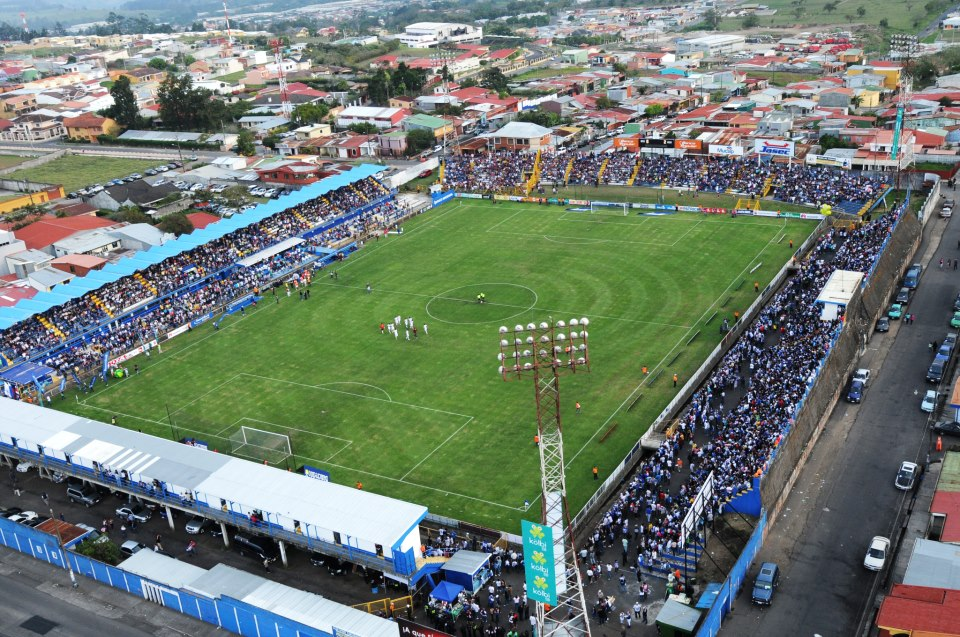
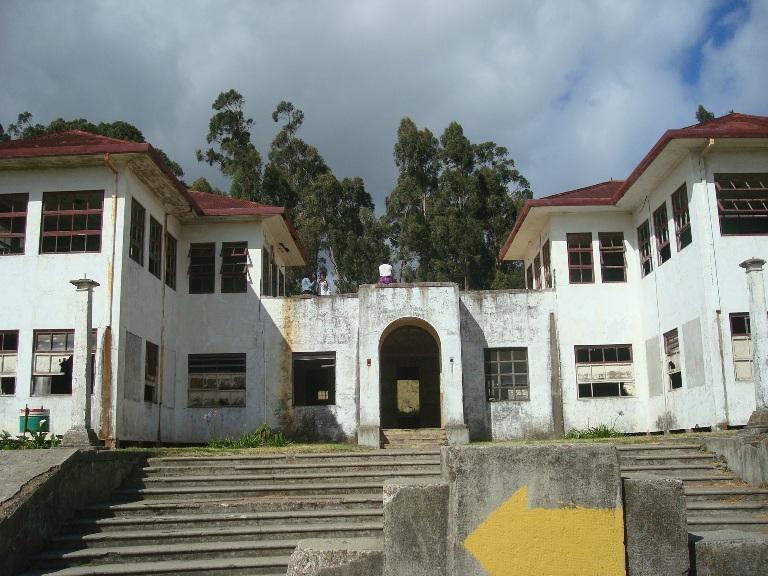
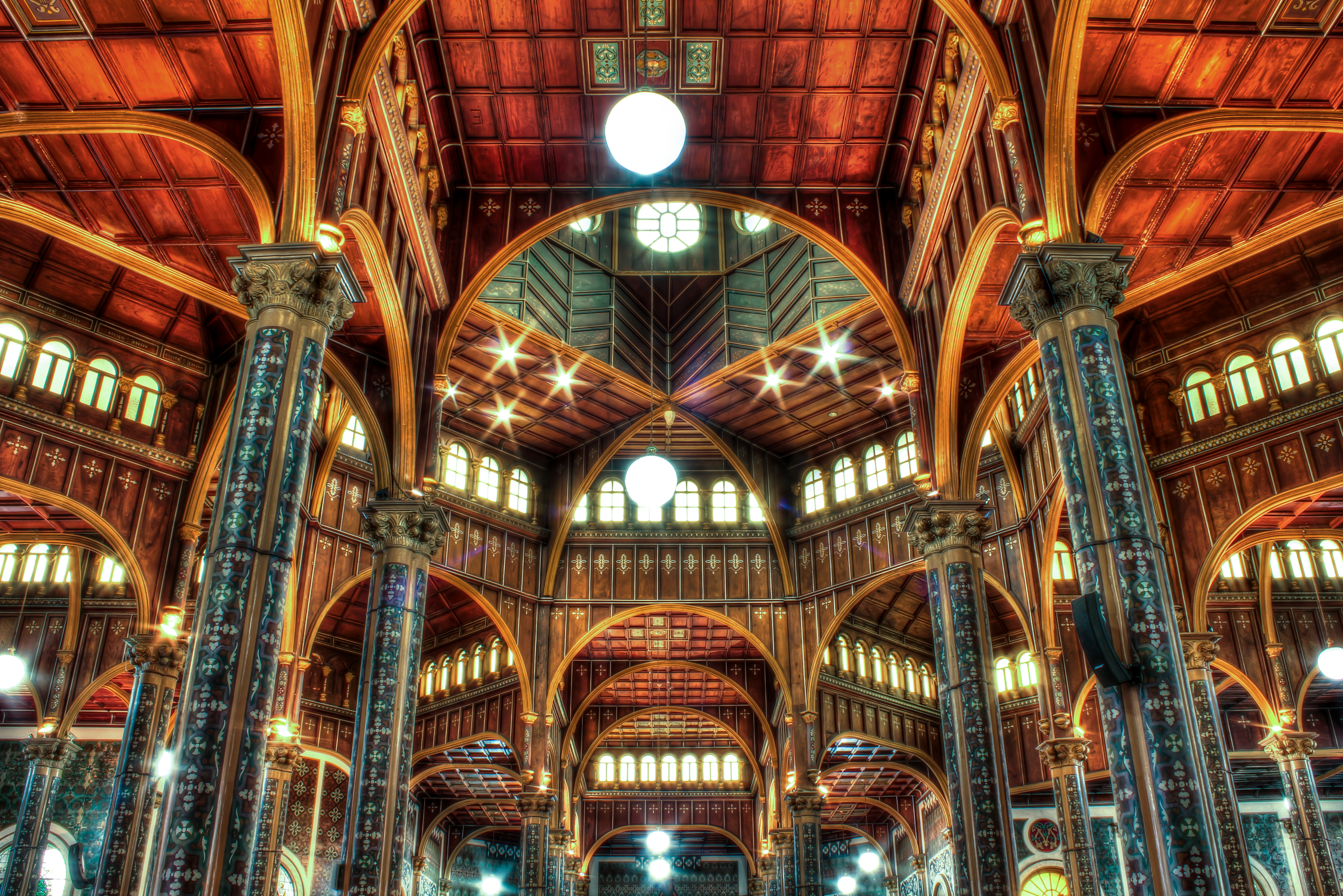
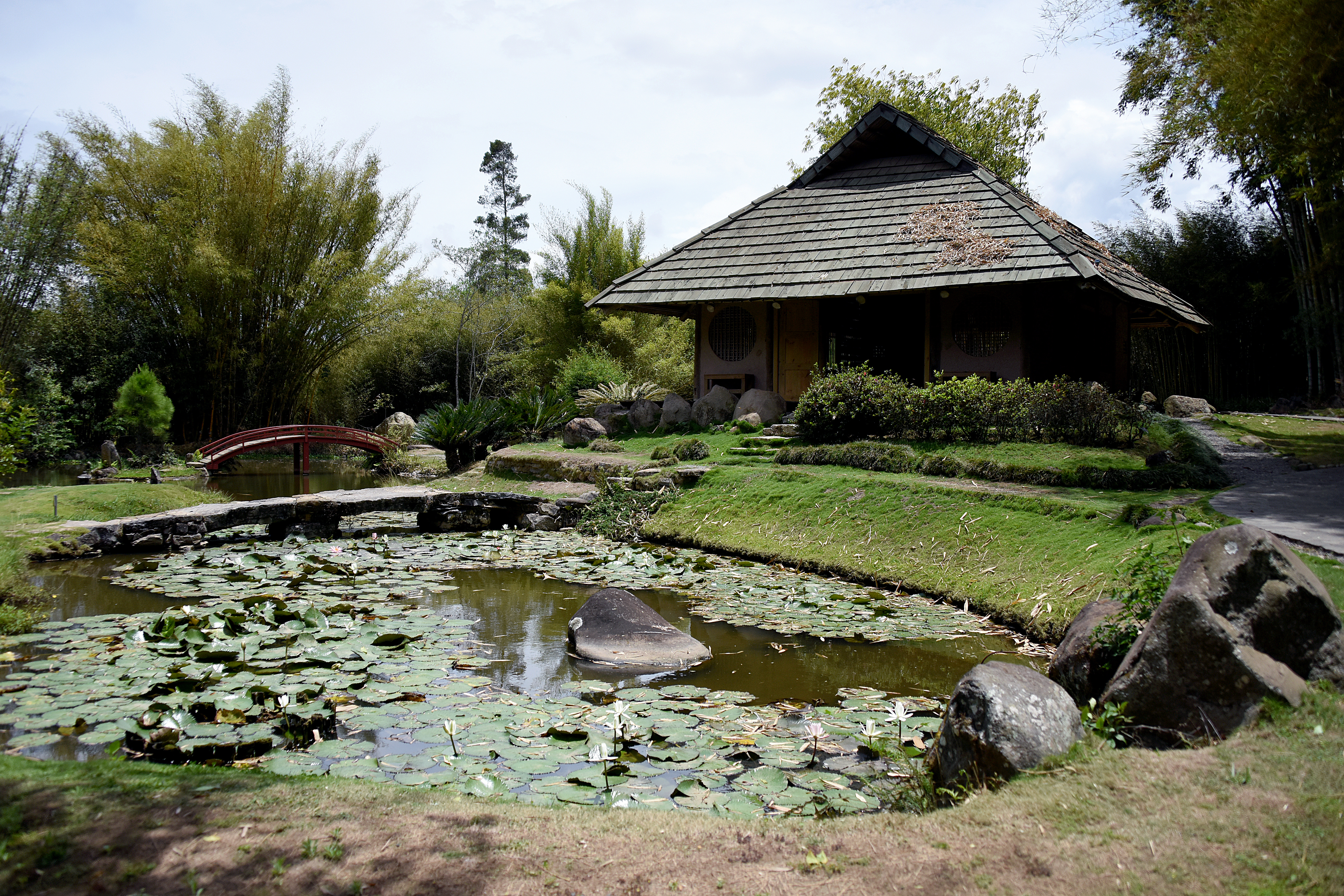
- View of central Cartago in 2024 Basilica of Our Lady of the Angels Plaza Mayor José Rafael "Fello" Meza Stadium Old Durán Sanatorium Interior of the Basilica Lankester Botanical Garden

- Flag Coat of arms
- Motto: Fide et pace (Latin) "Faith and Peace"
- Interactive map of Cartago
- Cartago canton location in Costa Rica
- Coordinates: 9.7889852°N 83.9261136°W
- Country: Costa Rica
- Province: Cartago
- Creation: 23 June 1563 (City); 7 December 1848 (Canton)
- Head city: Oriental
- Districts: Districts: Oriental; Occidental; Carmen; San Nicolás; Aguacaliente; Guadalupe; Corralillo; Tierra Blanca; Dulce Nombre; Llano Grande; Quebradilla

Government
  - Type: Mayor–council
  - Body: Municipalidad de Cartago
  - Mayor: Mario Redondo Poveda (PAY)

Area
  - Total: 278.66 km^{2} (107.59 sq mi)
- Elevation: 1,575 m (5,167 ft)

Population (2011)
  - Total: 147,898
  - Estimate (2022): 165,417
  - Density: 530.75/km^{2} (1,374.6/sq mi)
- Demonym(s): Cartaginés (m), Cartaginesa (f)
- Time zone: UTC−06:00
- Canton code: 301
- Website: www.muni-carta.go.cr

Cartago is a canton in the Cartago province of Costa Rica, with an estimated population of 165,417 as of 2022. It ranks as the fifth-most populous canton in the country and is the 42nd largest by area. Cartago is bordered by Desamparados and El Guarco to the south, Goicoechea and Vázquez de Coronado to the north, Oreamuno and Paraíso to the east, and Montes de Oca, La Unión, and Desamparados to the west.

The administrative and historical center of the canton is the City of Cartago, which comprises the Oriental and Occidental districts, rather than being a single district. Founded in 1563 by Spanish conqueror Juan Vásquez de Coronado, Cartago is the second-oldest surviving city in Costa Rica, after Espíritu Santo de Esparza, which was established in 1557. It served as the colonial capital of Costa Rica from 1563 until 1823, after the Ochomogo War. Following the amendments to the Constitution of 1847, the canton itself was officially established as a municipal administrative division on 7 December 1848 by law N° 36.

== Geography ==
Cartago covers an area of 278.66 km^{2} (107.59 sq mi) and has a mean elevation of 1,575 m (5,167 ft).

The canton is shaped like a T, extending southeast from its capital city to encompass a narrow strip of the Cordillera de Talamanca (Talamanca Mountain Range). This geographic configuration includes portions of the Pan-American Highway, making Cartago an important transit hub. The varied elevation and diverse landscapes contribute to the canton's natural diversity, which includes valleys, mountains, and fertile plains ideal for agriculture.

== Government ==
=== Mayor ===
Under the Municipal Code of 1998, which regulates local government in Costa Rica, mayors and vice mayors are democratically elected every four years on a joint ticket by the canton's residents.

Following the 2024 municipal elections, Mario Redondo Poveda was re-elected as mayor of Cartago, securing 43.51% of the vote. He was joined by Silvia María Navarro Gómez as first vice mayor and Marco Andrés Brenes Tinoco as second vice mayor, all serving for the term from 2024 to 2028.

Mayors of Cartago since the 2002 elections
Period	Name	Party
2002–2006	Harold Humberto Góngora Fuentes (Note: Also legally named Carlos Humberto Góngora Fuentes.)	PUSC
2006–2010	Rolando Alberto Rodríguez Brenes	PLN
2010–2016	Rolando Alberto Rodríguez Brenes	PLN
2016–2020	Rolando Alberto Rodríguez Brenes	PLN
2020–2024	Mario Redondo Poveda	ADC
2024–2028	Mario Redondo Poveda	PAY

=== Municipal Council ===
Like the mayor and vice mayors, all members of the Municipal Council (known as regidores) are elected every four years through a closed list system, though on a separate ballot from the canton's executive officials. The Cartago Municipal Council consists of nine seats, held by regidores and their substitutes. Substitutes can participate in meetings but do not have voting rights unless the primary regidor (regidor propietario) is absent.

The current president of the Municipal Council is Alonso Picado Chacón, a member of the Partido Actuemos Ya (Let's Act Now Party). The council's composition for the 2024–2028 term is as follows:

Current composition of the Municipal Council of Cartago after the 2024 municipal elections
Political parties in the Municipal Council of Cartago
Political party	Regidores		
Political party	№	Primary	Substitute
Let's Act Now Party (PAY)	4	Alonso Picado Chacón^{(P)}	Roberto Carlos Solano Ortega
Let's Act Now Party (PAY)	4	Franci Noheli Camacho Vargas	Mónica Machado Barquero
Let's Act Now Party (PAY)	4	Andrés Damián Zúñiga Orozco	Jorge Armando Brenes Calderón
Let's Act Now Party (PAY)	4	Grettel Quesada Moya	Natalia Isabel Serrano Redondo
National Liberation Party (PLN)	3	Jonathan Arce Moya	Braulio José Martínez Rojas
National Liberation Party (PLN)	3	Marcela Quesada Cerdas	Stephannie Melissa Meneses Quirós
National Liberation Party (PLN)	3	Caleb Andrés Pichardo Aguilar	Luis Martín Martínez Rojas
National Democratic Agenda (ADN)	1	Marvin Alvarado Méndez	Manuel Enrique González Espinoza
Progressive Liberal Party (PLP)	1	Alberto Acevedo Gutiérrez	Armando José Canno Díaz

== Districts ==
Districts of Cartago

The canton of Cartago is subdivided into the following districts:

1. Oriental
2. Occidental
3. Carmen
4. San Nicolás
5. Aguacaliente
6. Guadalupe
7. Corralillo
8. Tierra Blanca
9. Dulce Nombre
10. Llano Grande
11. Quebradilla

== Demographics ==
Historical population
Census	Pop.	±% p.a.
1864	16,780	—
1883	20,398	+1.03%
1892	25,898	+2.69%
1927	26,909	+0.11%
1950	30,763	+0.58%
1963	46,722	+3.27%
1973	65,310	+3.41%
1984	87,125	+2.65%
2000	132,057	+2.63%
2011	147,898	+1.04%
2022	165,417	+1.02%
Source: Instituto Nacional de Estadística y Censos; Centro Centroamericano de Población

Cartago had a population of 165,417 inhabitants in 2022, up from 147,898 people at the time of the 2011 census.

In 2022, Cartago had a Human Development Index of 0.791, the 3rd highest in its province, behind El Guarco and La Unión, and 18th in the country.

== Transportation ==
=== Road transportation ===
The canton is covered by the following road routes:

- National Route 2
- National Route 10
- National Route 206
- National Route 218
- National Route 219
- National Route 222
- National Route 228
- National Route 231
- National Route 233
- National Route 236
- National Route 304
- National Route 401
- National Route 405
- National Route 406
- National Route 407

=== Rail transportation ===
The Interurbano Line operated by Incofer goes through this canton.
