= El Tejar, Chimaltenango =

El Tejar
- Municipality and town
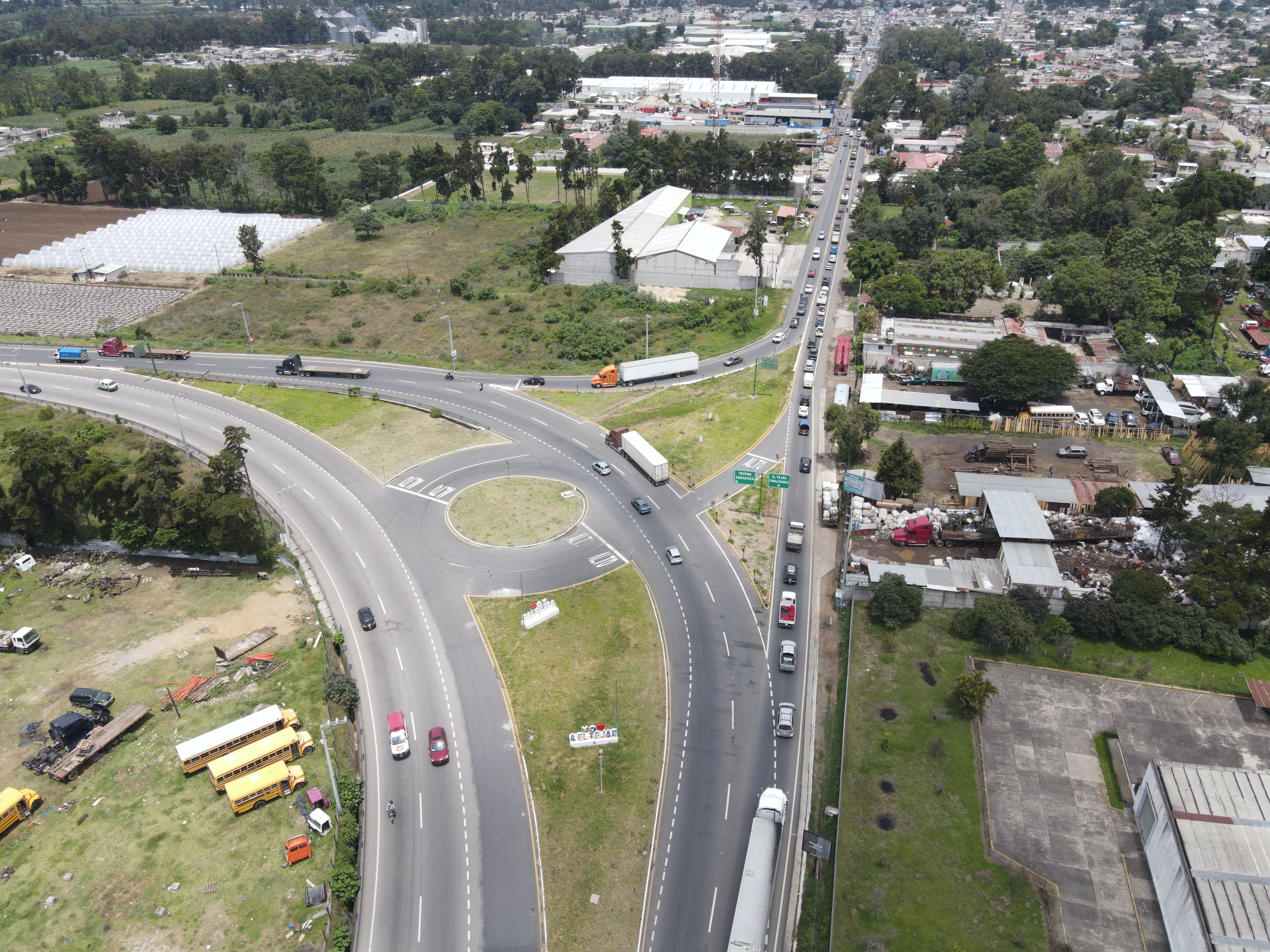
- El Tejar

- Location in Guatemala
- Coordinates: 14°39′N 90°48′W
- Country: Guatemala
- Department: Chimaltenango

Area
  - Total: 5.22 sq mi (13.51 km^{2})

Population (2023)
  - Total: 24,363
  - Density: 4,671/sq mi (1,803/km^{2})
- Time zone: UTC+6 (Central Time)
- Climate: Cwb

El Tejar is a municipality and town in the Chimaltenango department of Guatemala. It covers an area of approximately 13.51 km^{2} (5.22 sq mi). As per 2023 estimates, it has a population of about 24,363 inhabitants.

== History ==
Tejar was occupied by Kaqchikel people and belonged to the Sacatepéquez region. It was known as Tejar de Ortiz in the 16th century, as per documents from the general archives, it is mentioned in a will granted by Bartolomé de Archila dated on 12 December 1567. It is mentioned as a municipality in the Sacatepéquez district in the circuit of Chimaltenango when the Guatemalan constitution was adopted in 1825.

== Geography ==
El Tejar is a municipality in the Chimaltenango Department in Guatemala. It is spread over an area of 13.51 km^{2} (5.22 sq mi). It borders the municipalities of Chimaltenango to the north and west, Santo Domingo Xenacoj to the north and east, and Parramos and Pastores to the south. It is located about 48 km (30 mi) from the national capital of Guatemala City and 5 km (3.1 mi) from the departmental capital of Chimaltenango.

=== Climate ===
Located at an elevation of 1,810.62 m (5,940.4 ft) above sea level, El Tejar has a tropical monsoon climate (Köppen climate classification: Am). The municipality has an average annual temperature of 20.85 °C (69.53 °F) and receives about 144.76 mm (5.699 in) of rainfall annually.

Climate data for El Tejar
| Month | Jan | Feb | Mar | Apr | May | Jun | Jul | Aug | Sep | Oct | Nov | Dec | Year |
|---|---|---|---|---|---|---|---|---|---|---|---|---|---|
| Mean daily maximum °C (°F) | 22.2 (72.0) | 23.2 (73.8) | 24.9 (76.8) | 25.3 (77.5) | 25.1 (77.2) | 23.4 (74.1) | 23.6 (74.5) | 23.9 (75.0) | 23.3 (73.9) | 22.4 (72.3) | 22.5 (72.5) | 22.3 (72.1) | 23.5 (74.3) |
| Daily mean °C (°F) | 15.8 (60.4) | 16.5 (61.7) | 17.8 (64.0) | 19.0 (66.2) | 19.2 (66.6) | 18.7 (65.7) | 18.6 (65.5) | 18.5 (65.3) | 18.4 (65.1) | 17.5 (63.5) | 16.9 (62.4) | 15.9 (60.6) | 17.7 (63.9) |
| Mean daily minimum °C (°F) | 9.4 (48.9) | 9.8 (49.6) | 10.7 (51.3) | 12.7 (54.9) | 13.4 (56.1) | 14.1 (57.4) | 13.6 (56.5) | 13.2 (55.8) | 13.5 (56.3) | 12.6 (54.7) | 11.3 (52.3) | 9.6 (49.3) | 12.0 (53.6) |
| Average precipitation mm (inches) | 3 (0.1) | 3 (0.1) | 3 (0.1) | 37 (1.5) | 106 (4.2) | 251 (9.9) | 184 (7.2) | 174 (6.9) | 236 (9.3) | 127 (5.0) | 31 (1.2) | 7 (0.3) | 1,162 (45.8) |
Source: Climate-Data.org

== Demographics ==
The municipality had an estimated population of 24,363 inhabitants in 2023. The population consisted of 12,311 males and 12,052 females. About 25.9% of the population was below the age of fourteen, and 4.4% was over the age of 65 years. Majority of the population (80.2%) was classified as urban, while 19.8% lived in rural areas. About 33.2% of the inhabitants were born in the same municipality, while 66.2% were born in another municipality in Guatemala and 0.6% were born in other countries. Ladinos (66.1%) formed the major ethnic group, with Maya (32.8%) forming a significant minority. The municipality had a literacy rate of 93.4%, and Spanish (96.2%) was the most spoken language.

== See also ==
- List of places in Guatemala
