= Rafael Lucas Rodríguez =

Costa Rican biologist and artist

Rafael Lucas Rodríguez Caballero (March 24, 1915 in San Ramón – January 29, 1981) was a Costa Rican biologist, botanist, and artist known for his drawings of Costa Rican wildlife. He was a recipient of the Magón National Prize for Culture in 1977.
