= Cartago Province =

Province of Costa Rica

Cartago
- Province
- Flag Seal
- Nickname: Brumosos
- Coordinates: 9°48′N 83°39′W
- Country: Costa Rica
- Capital city: Cartago (pop. 156,600)

Area
  - Total: 3,124.61 km^{2} (1,206.42 sq mi)

Population
  - Total: 547,691
  - Density: 175.283/km^{2} (453.981/sq mi)
- ISO 3166 code: CR-C
- HDI (2022): 0.803 very high · 3rd of 7

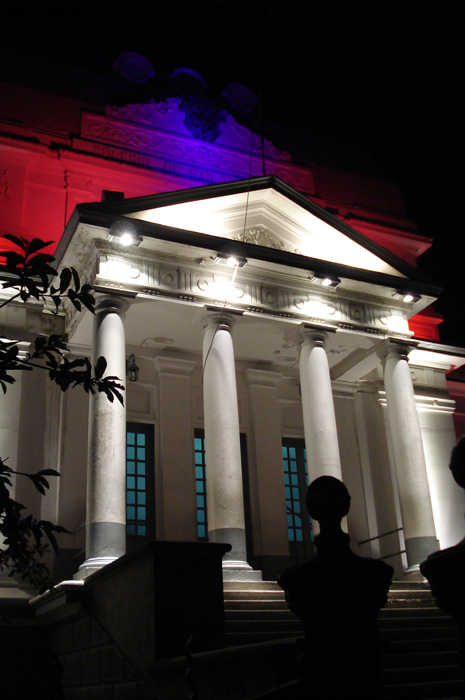
Colegio San Luis Gonzaga

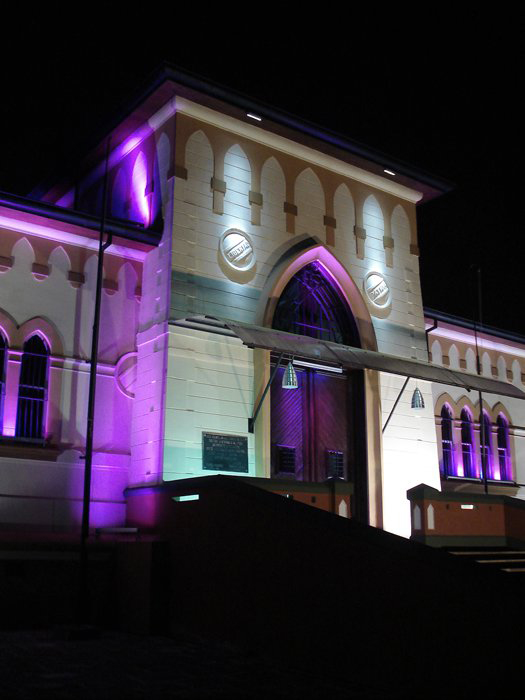
Museo Municipal de Cartago

Cartago (Spanish pronunciation: [kaɾˈtaɣo]), which means Carthage in Spanish, is a province of central Costa Rica. It is one of the smallest provinces, however probably the richest of the Spanish Colonial era sites and traditions.

== Geography ==
It is located in the central part of the country and borders the provinces of Limón to the east and San Jose to the west.

The capital is Cartago; until 1823 it was also the capital of Costa Rica, which is now San José. The province covers an area of 3,124.61 km^{2} and has a population of 490,903. It is subdivided into eight cantons and is connected to San José via a four-lane highway.

The highest peak is Cerro de la Muerte at 3,600 meters above sea level, and the lowest point of the province is Turrialba, which is 90 meters above sea level.

== Sports ==
Cartago is the residence of the Primera Division Team, the Club Sport Cartaginés, which play in the Estadio Jose Rafael Fello Meza, located at the south of the city of Cartago, in Barrio Asís.

== Cantons ==
Name	Capital	Area (km^{2})	Census 2000	Foundation Law
Cartago	Cartago	287.77	132,006	Law 36 of December 7, 1848
Paraíso	Paraíso	411.91	52,243	Law 36 of December 7, 1848
La Unión	Tres Ríos	44.83	80,664	Law 36 of December 7, 1848
Jiménez	Juan Viñas	286.43	14,103	Law 84 of August 19, 1903
Turrialba	Turrialba	1,642.67	68,495	Law 84 of August 19, 1903
Alvarado	Pacayas	81.06	12,160	Law 28 of July 9, 1908
Oreamuno	San Rafael	202.31	39,160	Law 68 of August 17, 1914
El Guarco	Tejar	167.69	34,092	Law 195 of July 26, 1939

== Gallery ==
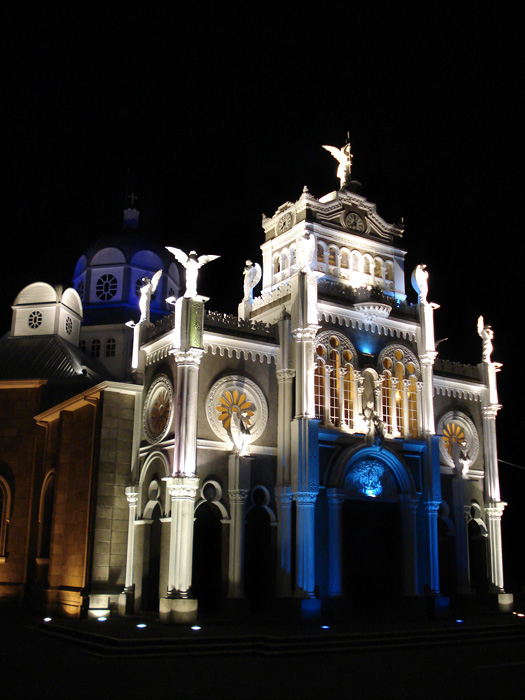
Basílica de Los Ángeles

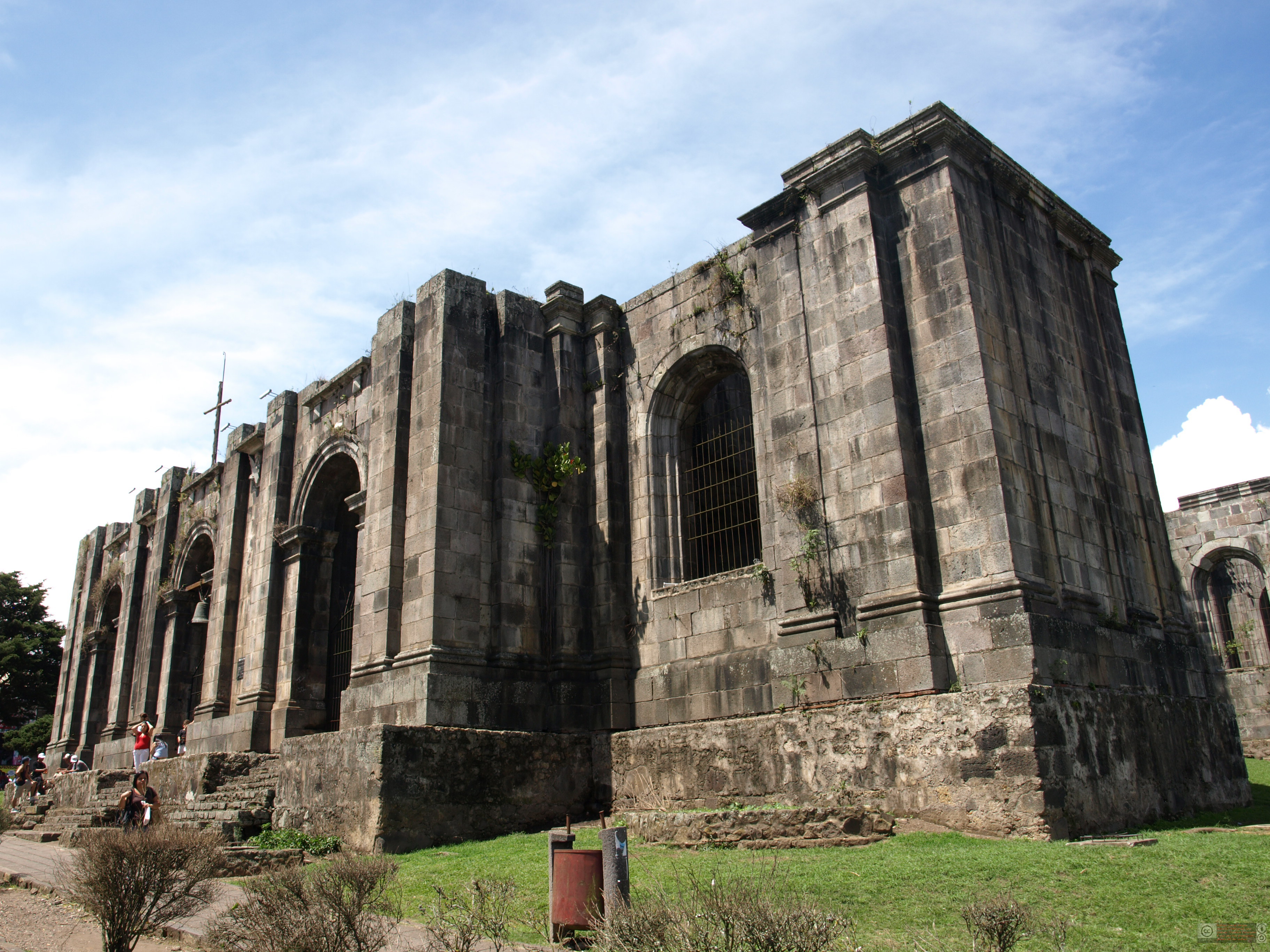
View of the ruins of the Parroquia de Santiago Apóstol in Cartago, Costa Rica.

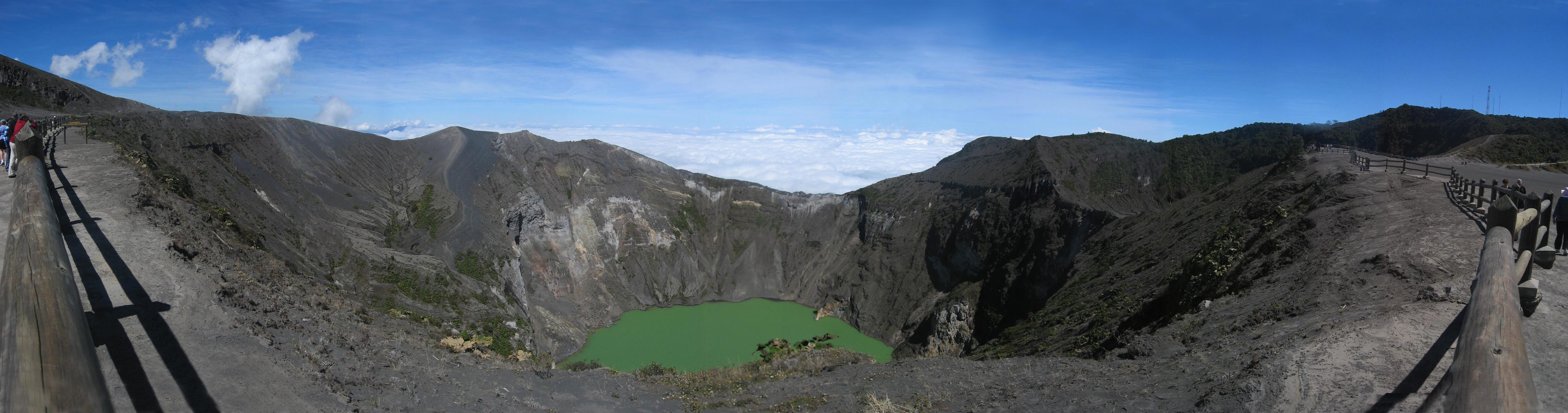
Irazú volcano

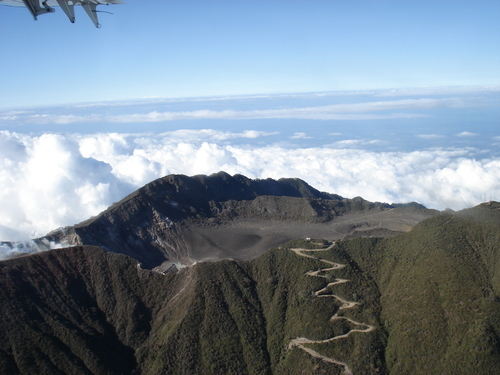
Turrialba volcano

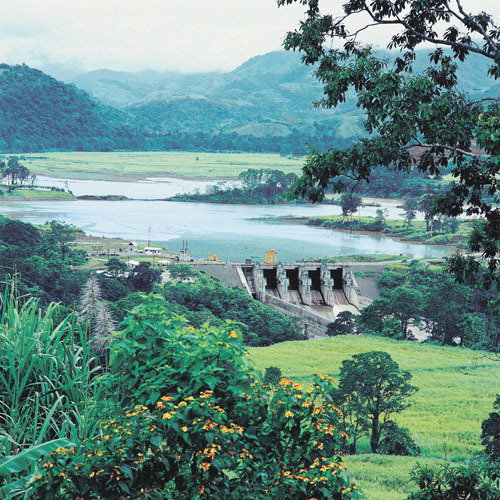
Angostura dam in Turrialba

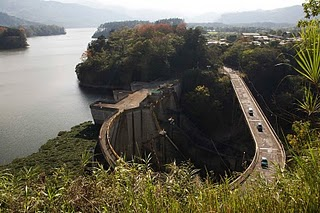
Cachi Dam

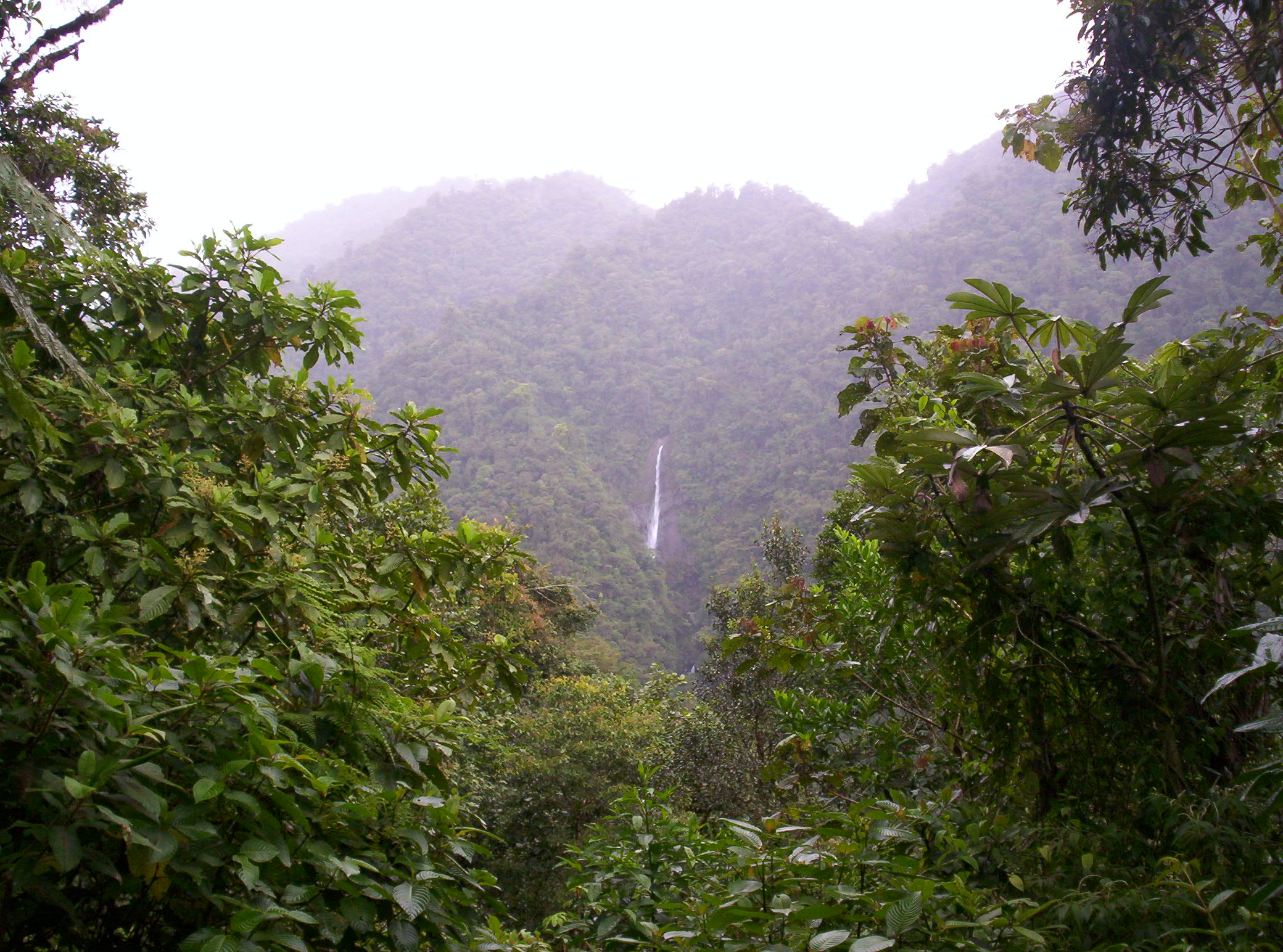
Tapantí National Park

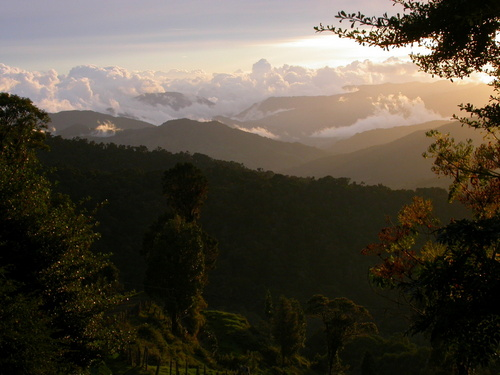
Cerro de la Muerte

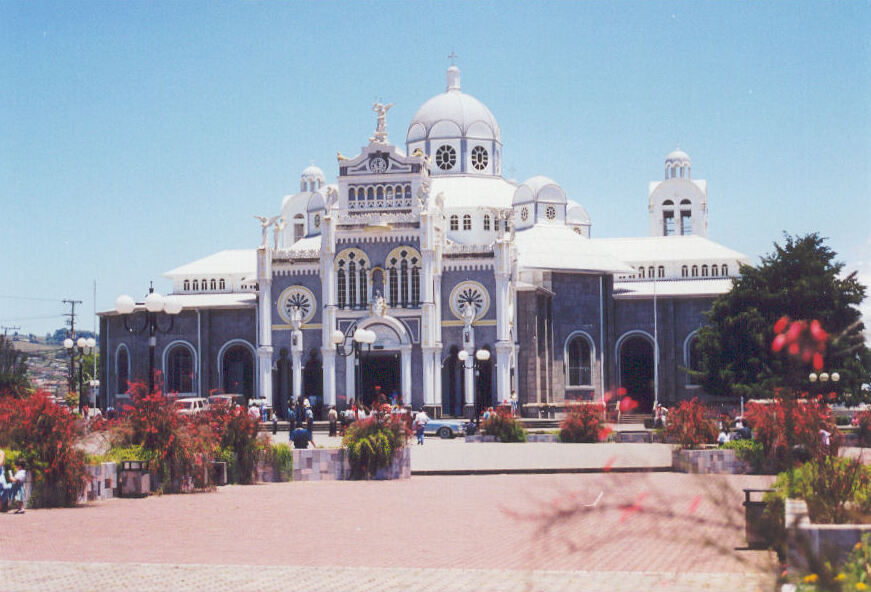
Basilica of Our Lady of the Angels, Cartago

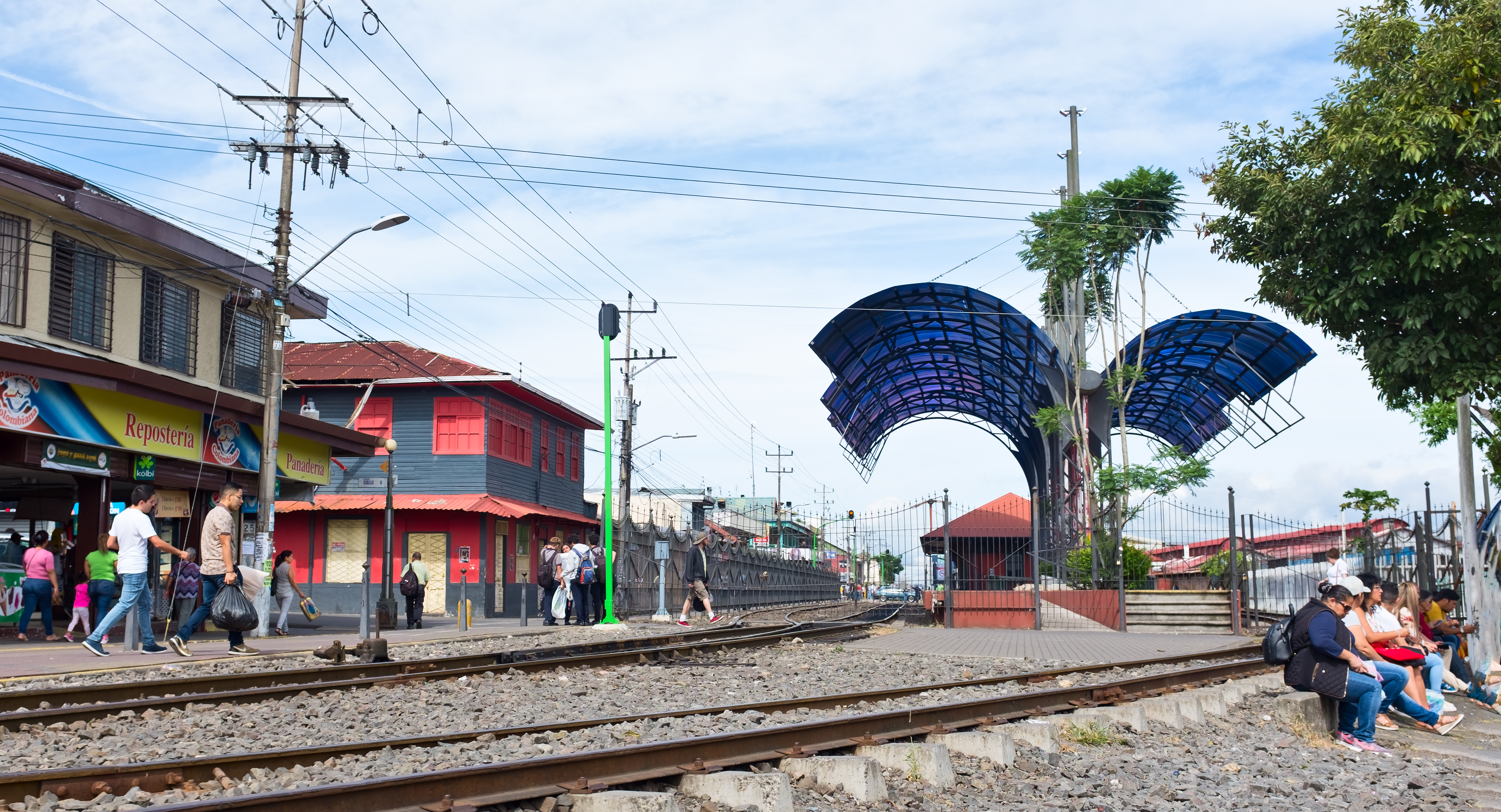
Cartago INCOFER Train Station
