= List of Catholic dioceses in Costa Rica =

The Roman Catholic Church in Costa Rica consists only of a Latin hierarchy, joint in the national Episcopal conference of Costa Rica, comprising only one ecclesiastical province headed by a Metropolitan archbishop, with seven suffragan dioceses each headed by a bishop.

There are no eastern Catholic, pre-diocesan or other exempt jurisdictions.

There are no titular sees. All defunct jurisdictions have current successor sees.

There is an Apostolic Nunciature to Costa Rica as papal diplomatic representation (embassy) level) in national capital San José de Costa Rica.

== Current Latin Dioceses ==
=== Ecclesiastical province of San José de Costa Rica ===
- Metropolitan Archdiocese of San José de Costa Rica
  - Diocese of Alajuela
  - Diocese of Cartago in Costa Rica
  - Diocese of Ciudad Quesada
  - Diocese of Limón
  - Diocese of Puntarenas
  - Diocese of San Isidro de El General
  - Diocese of Tilarán.

== See also ==
- List of Catholic dioceses (structured view)

== Sources and external links ==
- GCatholic.org - data for all sections.
- Catholic-Hierarchy entry.
