= Óscar Fernández Guillén =

Costa Rican Catholic prelate (born 1949)

His Excellency, The Most Reverend Oscar Gerardo Fernández Guillén
- Bishop Emeritus of Puntarenas
- Church: Catholic Church
- Diocese: Puntarenas
- Appointed: 4 June 2003
- Installed: 25 July 2003
- Term ended: 20 June 2026
- Predecessor: Hugo Barrantes Ureña
- Successor: Elímar Gerardo Carvajal Durán
- Other post: President of the Episcopal Conference of Costa Rica (2011–2017)

Orders
- Ordination: 8 July 1977 by Carlos Humberto Rodríguez Quirós
- Consecration: 25 July 2003 by Hugo Barrantes Ureña

Personal details
- Born: Oscar Gerardo Fernández Guillén; 22 December 1949 (age 76) San Rafael de Oreamuno, Cartago Province, Costa Rica

Oscar Gerardo Fernández Guillén (born 22 December 1949) is a Costa Rican Catholic prelate who served as Bishop of Puntarenas from 2003 until his retirement in 2026.

== Early life and education ==
Fernández Guillén was born on 22 December 1949 in San Rafael de Oreamuno, Cartago Province, Costa Rica. He studied philosophy and theology at the Central Seminary in San José and at the Catholic University of Costa Rica.

== Priestly ministry ==
He was ordained a priest for the Archdiocese of San José de Costa Rica on 8 July 1977 by Archbishop Carlos Humberto Rodríguez Quirós.

During his priestly ministry he served in several parishes of the archdiocese, including Concepción de Tres Ríos, Tobosi, Acosta and Goicoechea. He also served as chaplain of San Juan de Dios Hospital, episcopal vicar, and a member of the Archdiocesan Presbyteral Council.

== Episcopal ministry ==
On 4 June 2003, Pope John Paul II appointed Fernández Guillén Bishop of Puntarenas. He received episcopal consecration on 25 July 2003 from Archbishop Hugo Barrantes Ureña, with Bishop José Francisco Ulloa Rojas and Archbishop Emeritus Román Arrieta Villalobos serving as co-consecrators.

Fernández Guillén participated in the Synod of Bishops on the Family in 2014, where he commented on the synodal process and the role of the Holy Spirit in guiding the Church's discernment.

Following the resignation of Archbishop José Rafael Quirós Quirós from the presidency of the Costa Rican Episcopal Conference in 2025, Fernández Guillén assumed the leadership of the conference on an interim basis as first vice-president until the bishops elected a new president.

On 20 June 2026, Pope Leo XIV accepted his resignation from the pastoral governance of the Diocese of Puntarenas upon reaching the canonical retirement age and appointed Elímar Gerardo Carvajal Durán as his successor.
