= José Francisco Ulloa =

José Francisco Ulloa Rojas
- Bishop Emeritus of Cartago in Costa Rica
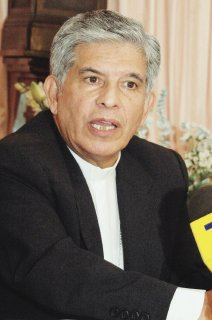
- Church: Catholic Church
- Diocese: Diocese of Cartago in Costa Rica
- In office: 24 May 2005 – 14 March 2017
- Predecessor: Diocese erected
- Successor: Mario Enrique Quirós Quirós
- Previous post: Bishop of Limón (1994-2005)

Orders
- Ordination: 19 December 1964
- Consecration: 22 February 1995 by Giacinto Berloco

Personal details
- Born: 1 October 1940 (age 85) Cartago, Cartago Province, Costa Rica

José Francisco Ulloa Rojas (born 1 October 1940, in Cartago) is a Costa Rican priest and bishop. He entered the Minor Seminary in 1959. On 19 December 1964, he was ordained priest by Bishop Carlos Humberto Rodríguez Quirós. He was elected first bishop of the Diocese of Limón on 30 December 1994, and first bishop of the Diocese of Cartago, Costa Rica in 2005.

== Priesthood ==
From 1967 to 1971, after completing studies of Priesthood Sociology in Rome, he worked in the International Movement for a Better World. He has lectured at the Central Seminary (1971–1992), he was Pastoral Vicar of the Archdiocese of San José (1974–1976), Rector of the Central Seminary (1982–1992), President of the Organization of Latin American Seminaries (OSLAM) (1989–1991). In October 1992 he was invited by Pope John Paul II to participate as a representative of the clergy at the Fourth General Conference of Latin American Bishops in Santo Domingo, Dominican Republic. On 22 February 1995, he received his Episcopal Ordination on the Feast of the Teaching of St. Peter from the Papal Nuncio Giacinto Berloco. Takes possession of its headquarters in the city of Limon, Costa Rica. On 22 May 2005, John Paul II erected the Diocese of Cartago and appointed Ulloa as its first bishop. Later, the Diocese of Cartago emerged from the territorial division of the Archdiocese of San José and part of the Diocese of Limon, and Ulloa was appointed as its first bishop. Ulloa currently holds the post of vice president of the CECOR.

== Conviction by the Tribunal Supremo de Elecciones ==
In May 2010, Monsignor Ulloa was convicted by the Supreme Electoral Tribunal. In September 2009, Monsignor Ulloa called during a liturgical act the Catholic faithful not to vote for Costa Rican politicians that in his opinion did not share the Catholic doctrine. According to press reports, Ulloa in his speech referred to a bill that was being debated in the Legislative Assembly that sought to eliminate the requirement that certain public officials swear in God's name at the time of taking office, and would have separated the Catholic Church and the state (Costa Rica is a confessional state, although it guarantees freedom of worship for non-Catholic denominations). The legislative initiative was not successful. According to the TSE, Ulloa had disrespected Article 28 of the Constitution, which prohibits the clergy from being involved in partisan politics, invoking for that purpose religious reasons.
