= Elímar Carvajal =

Costa Rican Roman Catholic bishop (born 1976)

The Most Reverend Elímar Gerardo Carvajal Durán
- Bishop of Puntarenas
- Church: Catholic Church
- Archdiocese: San José de Costa Rica
- Diocese: Puntarenas
- Appointed: 20 June 2026
- Predecessor: Óscar Gerardo Fernández Guillén
- Previous posts: Diocesan Vicar for Pastoral Ministry, Diocese of Alajuela (2022–2026)

Orders
- Ordination: 1 November 2003 by José Rafael Barquero Arce
- Consecration: 6 August 2026 by Óscar Gerardo Fernández Guillén

Personal details
- Born: Elímar Gerardo Carvajal Durán; 6 May 1976 (age 50) Grecia, Alajuela Province, Costa Rica
- Education: National Seminary Nuestra Señora de los Ángeles; Pontifical John Paul II Institute for Studies on Marriage and Family (Valencia)
- Motto: Ipse elegit nos

Elímar Gerardo Carvajal Durán (born 6 May 1976) is a Costa Rican Roman Catholic prelate who has served as bishop of the Diocese of Puntarenas since 2026. Appointed by Pope Leo XIV on 20 June 2026, he became the youngest serving Catholic bishop in Costa Rica at the time of his appointment.

== Early life and education ==
Carvajal Durán was born on 6 May 1976 in Grecia, in the Diocese of Alajuela. He studied philosophy and theology at the National Seminary Nuestra Señora de los Ángeles in Costa Rica. He later earned a Licentiate in Marriage and Family Sciences from the Pontifical John Paul II Institute for Studies on Marriage and Family in Valencia, Spain, and obtained a diploma in Participatory Pastoral Planning from CEBITEPAL of CELAM.

== Priestly ministry ==
Carvajal Durán was ordained to the priesthood for the Diocese of Alajuela on 1 November 2003 by Bishop José Rafael Barquero Arce.

His pastoral assignments have included:

- Vice-parish priest of Nuestra Señora de la Merced, Grecia (2003–2005);
- Vice-parish priest of San Guzmán, Orotina (2006–2007);
- Parish priest of Sagrada Familia, Invu Las Cañas (2008–2011);
- Parish priest of Nuestra Señora de la Merced, Grecia (2011–2019);
- Forane vicar of the Vicaría Monseñor Monestel;
- Vice-parish priest of the Vicaría Monseñor Monestel; and
- Diocesan Vicar for Pastoral Ministry from 2022 until his episcopal appointment.

== Episcopal ministry ==
On 20 June 2026, Pope Leo XIV accepted the resignation of Bishop Óscar Gerardo Fernández Guillén and appointed Carvajal Durán as Bishop of Puntarenas. His appointment was widely noted because, at the age of 50, he became the youngest Catholic bishop serving in Costa Rica.

He received episcopal consecration on 6 August 2026. The principal consecrator was Bishop Óscar Gerardo Fernández Guillén.
