= Presinger =

Presinger is a surname. Notable people with the surname include:

- Ádám Présinger (born 1989), Hungarian football player
- Agustín Blessing Presinger (1868–1934), German priest, bishop, and missionary

== See also ==
- Preisinger
- Preminger
