= Diocese of Tilarán-Liberia =

Latin Catholic ecclesiastical jurisdiction in Costa Rica

Coordinates: 10.4701°N 84.9670°W

Diocese of Tilarán-Liberia Dioecesis Tilaranensis-Liberiana Diócesis de Tilarán-Liberia

Location
- Country: Costa Rica
- Ecclesiastical province: Province of San José de Costa Rica
- Metropolitan: Hugo Barrantes Ureña

Statistics
- Area: 12,500 km^{2} (4,800 sq mi)
- Population: Total; Catholics: (as of 2014); 453,000; 384,000 (84.8%)
- Parishes: 34

Information
- Denomination: Catholic Church
- Sui iuris church: Latin Church
- Rite: Roman Rite
- Established: 22 July 1961 (65 years ago)
- Cathedral: Tilarán Cathedral
- Co-cathedral: Cathedral of the Immaculate Conception
- Secular priests: 62

Current leadership
- Pope: Leo XIV
- Bishop: Manuel Eugenio Salazar Mora

Map
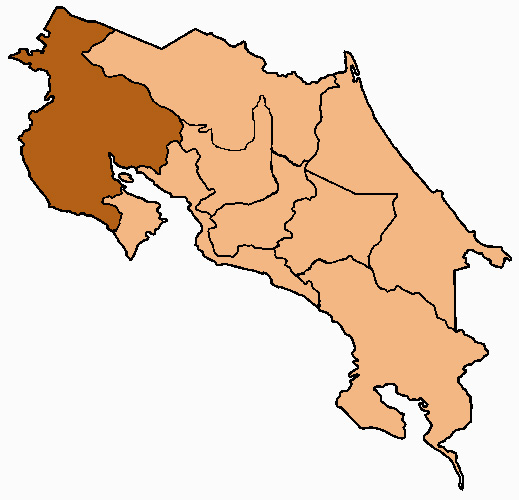

The Diocese of Tilarán-Liberia (Latin: Dioecesis Tilaranensis-Liberiana) is a Latin Church ecclesiastical territory or diocese of the Catholic Church in Costa Rica. It is a suffragan diocese in the ecclesiastical province of the metropolitan Archdiocese of San José de Costa Rica. It was erected as a diocese on 22 July 1961.

== Bishops ==
=== Ordinaries ===
- Román Arrieta Villalobos (1961–1979), appointed Archbishop of San José de Costa Rica
- Héctor Morera Vega (1979–2002)
- Vittorino Girardi, M.C.C.I. (2002–2016)
- Manuel Eugenio Salazar Mora (2016–present)

=== Other priests of this diocese who became bishops ===
- Oswaldo Brenes Álvarez, appointed Bishop of Ciudad Quesada in 2008
- Dagoberto Campos Salas, appointed titular Archbishop in 2018

== Territorial losses ==
Year	Along with	To form
1995	Diocese of Alajuela	Diocese of Ciudad Quesada
1998	Diocese of San Isidro de El General	Diocese of Puntarenas

== External links and references ==
- "Diocese of Tilarán". Catholic-Hierarchy.
