= Diocese of Alajuela =

Latin Catholic ecclesiastical jurisdiction in Costa Rica

Coordinates: 10.0167°N 84.2132°W

Diocese of Alajuela Dioecesis Alaiuelensis Diócesis de Alajuela
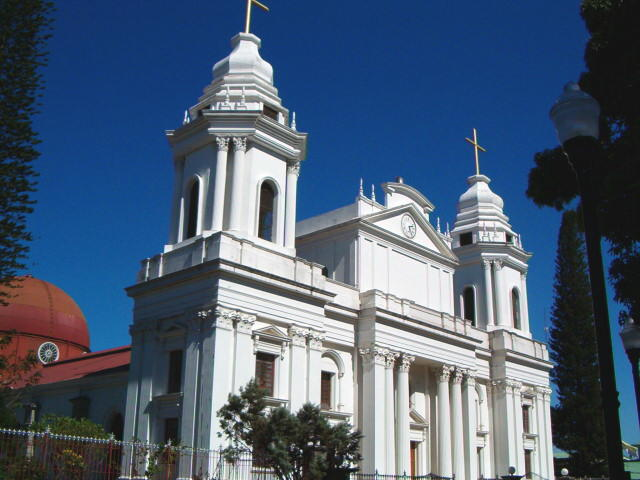
- Catedral de la Virgen del Pilar

Location
- Country: Costa Rica
- Ecclesiastical province: Province of San José de Costa Rica
- Metropolitan: Hugo Barrantes Ureña

Statistics
- Area: 2,700 km^{2} (1,000 sq mi)
- Population: Total; Catholics: (as of 2006); 662,520; 551,100 (83.2%)
- Parishes: 31

Information
- Denomination: Catholic Church
- Sui iuris church: Latin Church
- Rite: Roman Rite
- Established: 16 February 1921 (104 years ago)
- Cathedral: Cathedral of Our Lady of the Pillar

Current leadership
- Pope: Leo XIV
- Bishop: Bartolomé Buigues Oller, T.C.
- Bishops emeritus: Angel San Casimiro Fernandez, O.A.R.

Map
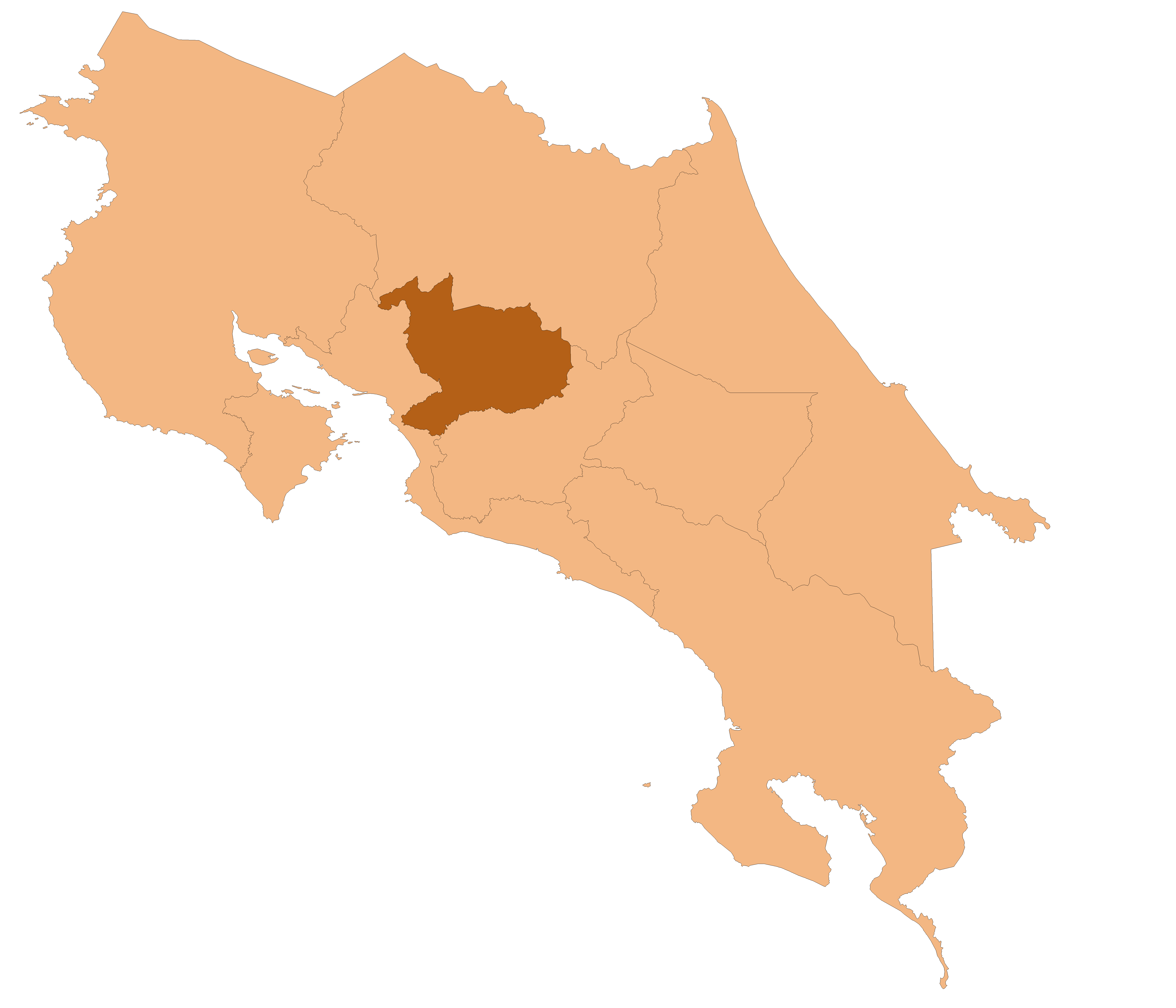

The Diocese of Alajuela (Latin: Dioecesis Alaiuelensis) is a Latin Church ecclesiastical territory or diocese of the Catholic Church in Costa Rica. It is a suffragan diocese in the ecclesiastical province of the metropolitan Archdiocese of San José de Costa Rica. The Diocese of Alajuela was erected on 16 February 1921.

== Bishops ==
=== Ordinaries ===
- Antonio del Carmen Monestel Zamora (1921–1937)
- Víctor Manuel Sanabria Martínez (1938–1940), appointed Archbishop of San José de Costa Rica
- Juan Vicente Solís Fernández (1940–1967)
- Enrique Bolaños Quesada (1970–1980)
- José Rafael Barquero Arce (1980–2007)
- Angel San Casimiro Fernandez, O.A.R. (2007–2018)
- Bartolomé Buigues Oller, T.C. (2018- )

=== Auxiliary bishops ===
- Enrique Bolaños Quesada (1962–1970), appointed Bishop here
- José Rafael Barquero Arce (1979–1980), appointed Bishop here

== Territorial losses ==
Year	Along with	To form
1954	Archdiocese of San José de Costa Rica	Diocese of San Isidro de El General
1961		Diocese of Tilarán
1995	Diocese of Tilarán	Diocese of Ciudad Quesada

== See also ==
- Catholic Church in Costa Rica
- List of Roman Catholic dioceses in Costa Rica
