= Timeline of San José, Costa Rica =

The following is a timeline of the history of the city of San José, Costa Rica.

== Prior to 20th century ==
- 1738 - San José founded.
- 1760 - Town hall in use (approximate date).
- 1776 - Church built.
- 1802 - Metropolitan Cathedral of San José built.
- 1808 - Population: 8,316.
- 1812 - "Town council elected."
- 1813 - San Jose attains city status.
- 1814 - Casa de Enseñanza de Santo Tomás (school) opens.
- 1823 - San José becomes capital of Costa Rica.
- 1824 - Population: 15,472.
- 1835 - League War (Costa Rica).
- 1836 - Population: 17,965.
- 1841 - 2 September: Earthquake.^{(es)}
- 1845
  - Puntarenas-San Jose road built.
  - Hospital San Juan de Dios (San José) established.
- 1848 - Carmen District created.
- 1850 - Roman Catholic diocese of San José de Costa Rica established.
- 1855 - Presidential Palace, Costa Rica built.
- 1864 - Population: 8,863.
- 1869 - Telegraph begins operating.
- 1878 - Metropolitan Cathedral of San José and Estacion del Pacifico (rail station) built.
- 1880 - Public market built (approximate date).
- 1883 - Population: 13,484.
- 1884 - Street lighting installed.
- 1886 - Telephone begins operating.
- 1887 - Parque Morazán (park) established.
- 1889
  - Streetcar begins operating.
  - Laguna Swamp drained.
- 1890 - Estacion del Atlantico (rail station) begins operating.
- 1892 - Population: 19,326.
- 1895 - Monumento Nacional de Costa Rica unveiled.
- 1897 - National Theatre of Costa Rica opens.

== 20th century ==
- 1904 - Population: 24,500.
- 1907 - Iglesia de Nuestra Señora de La Merced (San José) (church) built (approximate date).
- 1908 - Population: 26, 500 (approximate).
- 1910 - Corte de Justicia Centroamericana relocated to San Jose (approximate date).
- 1911 - Sociedad Gimnástica Española de San José (sport club) formed.
- 1916 - Botanical garden opens.
- 1918 - Population: 38,016 city; 51,658 metro.
- 1920 - Parque España (San José) established.
- 1921 - Zoo opens.
- 1924
  - 4 March: Earthquake.^{(es)}
  - National Stadium opens.
- 1927 - Population: 50,580.
- 1930 - Gran Hotel (Costa Rica) built.
- 1948 - March–April: Costa Rican Civil War.
- 1950 - Population: 86,909 city; 139,915 urban agglomeration.
- 1958 - Cuesta de Moras (national congress building) constructed.
- 1963 - March: Irazú Volcano erupts near city.
- 1973 - Population: 215,441 city; 395,401 urban agglomeration.
- 1977 - La Sabana Metropolitan Park established.
- 1978 - Costa Rican Museum of Art opens.
- 1980 - United Nations' University for Peace established near San Jose.
- 1985 - Pre-Columbian Gold Museum opens.
- 1987 - Sister city relationship established with Puerto Vallarta, Mexico.
- 1990 - City twinned with Almaty, Kazakhstan; Miami, USA; and San Jose, California, USA.
- 1993 - April: Supreme Court of Justice hostage crisis.
- 1994
  - Museum of Contemporary Art and Design established.
  - Population: 315,909 city; 1,186,417 urban agglomeration (estimate).
- 1998 - Johnny Araya Monge becomes mayor.

== 21st century ==
- 2000 - City twinned with Mexico City, Mexico.
- 2008 - City twinned with Puebla, Mexico.
- 2011
  - National Stadium rebuilt.
  - Population: 288,054.
- 2012 - 5 September: 2012 Costa Rica earthquake occurs.
- 2013 - Sandra García Pérez becomes mayor.

== See also ==
- San José history

== Bibliography ==
=== in English ===
- "San José de Costa Rica" . Encyclopædia Britannica. Vol. 24 (11th ed.). 1910. p. 150.
- David F. Marley (2005), "Costa Rica: San Jose", Historic Cities of the Americas, USA: ABC-CLIO, p. 335+, ISBN 1-57607-027-1

=== in Spanish ===
- Carlos Manuel Zamora Hernández (1997), Monumentos escultóricos de la ciudad de San José (in Spanish), Ministerio de Cultura, Juventud y Deportes de Costa Rica, Centro de Investigación y Conservación del Patrimonio Cultural
