= Catholic Church in Costa Rica =

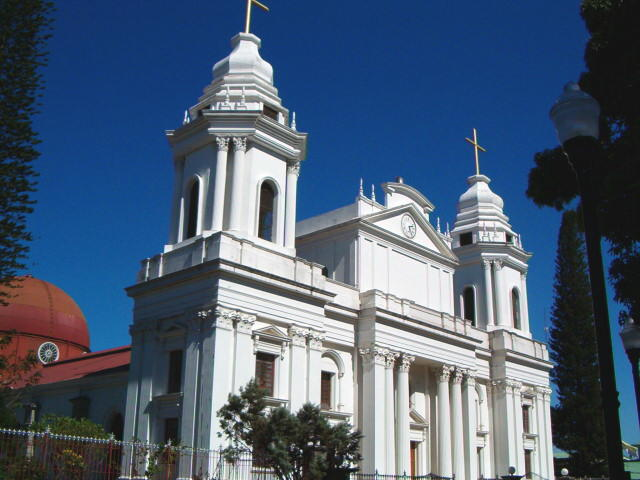
Alajuela Cathedral

The Catholic Church in Costa Rica is part of the worldwide Catholic Church, under the spiritual leadership of the Pope in Rome. Catholicism is the state religion of the country, and there are approximately 2.3 million Catholics—47% of the total population. The country is divided into eight dioceses and one archdiocese:

- Archdiocese of San José de Costa Rica
  - Diocese of Alajuela
  - Diocese of Cartago
  - Diocese of Ciudad Quesada
  - Diocese of Limón
  - Diocese of Puntarenas
  - Diocese of San Isidro de El General
  - Diocese of Tilarán

== See also ==
- Religion in Costa Rica
- List of Central American and Caribbean saints
