= Minor Calvo =

Costa Rican priest and criminal

Minor de Jesús Calvo
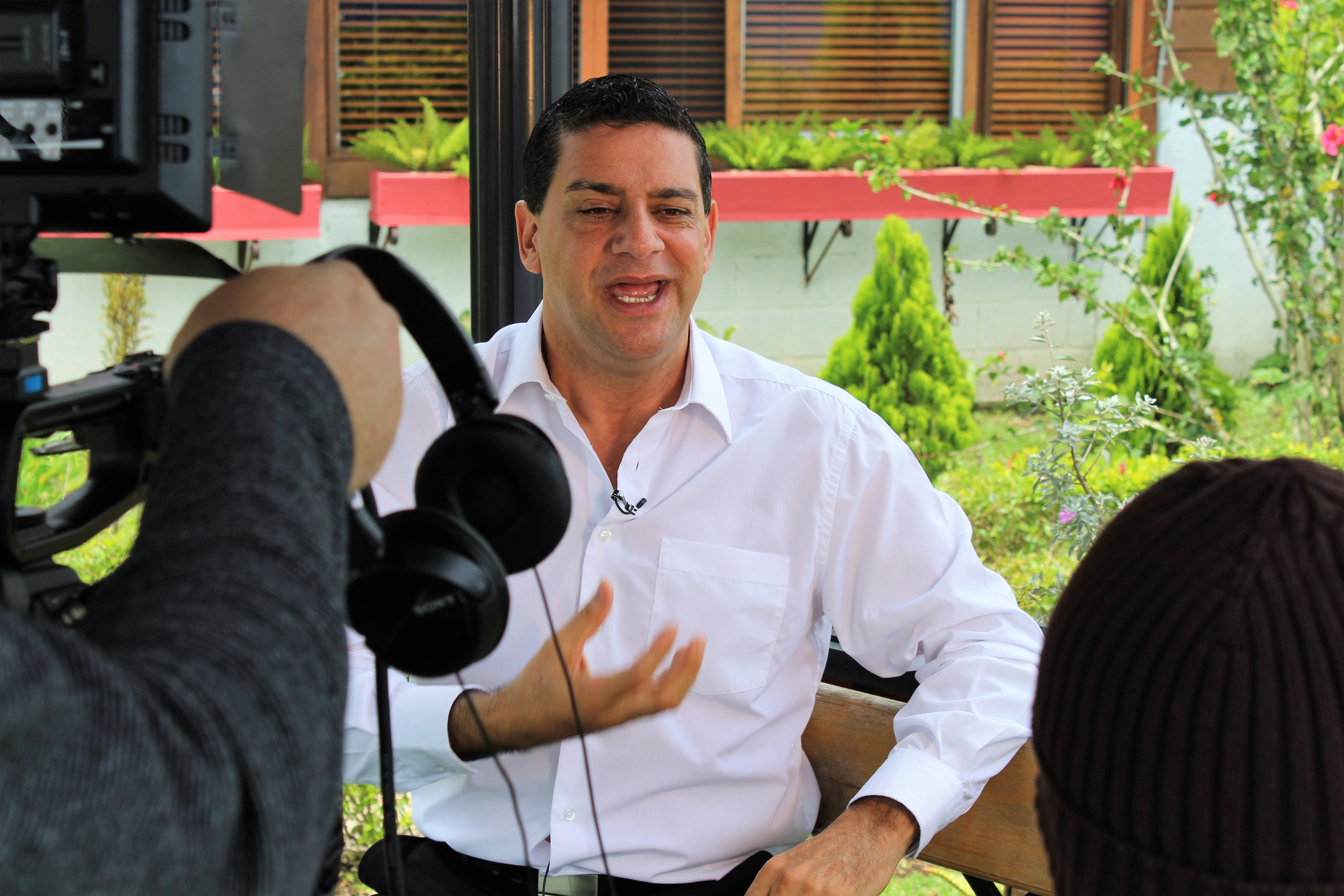
- Calvo in 2017.
- Born: 9 January 1964 (age 62); Cartago, Costa Rica
- Occupations: Catholic priest, Businessman
- Status: Free
- Convictions: 8 years
- Criminal charges: Fraud

Minor de Jesus Calvo (born 9 January 1964) is a Catholic priest and radio personality born in Costa Rica, convicted of fraud and accused of murder in 2007.

== His works ==
Father Minor jumped into the public eye as a charismatic leader in the Catholic Church in Costa Rica. He was able to gather many people in the Paso Ancho church.

=== TV program ===
He then got his own TV show, that lasted about 3 minutes, and in which he read a Bible passage and analyzed it by applying it to everyday life. This program gave popularity to the father, who soon moved to the radio.

=== Radio program ===
Radio Maria de Guadalupe was founded with the help of many entrepreneurs, but also monetary contributions collected in donation campaigns organized by the station, through various events, from social, to even people that were made to the radio to deposit their donations.

The station Radio Maria de Guadalupe collected approximately ¢ 1,000,000 (about $2,500 at that time) daily, which is a record in Costa Rican radio, second only to programs (television, radio because no one has these figures) created specifically to raise money, such as Chain Telethon or Mayor.

== Controversy ==
However, criticism from a satirical radio comedy program, called La Patada (The Kick) conducted by a Colombian named Parmenio Medina (assassinated in 2001), created friction between the two programs, as La Patada accused Radio Maria de Guadalupe of alleged embezzlement. The kick was characterized by a cutting sarcastic humor, and their jokes included topics about corruption, football, politics, and now, "Radio Maria de Guadalupe".

This version was supported by some former employees of the radio, but was denied by the father, despite weighing evidence against him:

- Members of his family and friends made frequent trips to the United States parent company, funded with money from non-clarified sources
- They did not any give receipts to donors. This prevented making any accounting clear

The situation worsened when the priest was stopped in his car by a Costa Rican police officer driving at nighttime in the La Sabana Metropolitan Park (which is not a road crossing zone, and that for the most part, has no lighting at night) accompanied by a minor. While the father wasn't caught committing a crime, the situation was taken by many as reprehensible, or at least suspect. The father testified that he was teaching the child how to drive.

== Closing Radio Maria de Guadalupe ==
Due to the highly controversial situation, Monsignor Román Arrieta Villalobos (who would die two years later), the highest Catholic authority in Costa Rica, decided to terminate the operations of the radio. Several groups demonstrated against the closure, as were certain groups of taxi drivers and other followers of the radio. But the decision was taken and held.

Today, the frequency is used by the radio station "La Paz del Dial" and remains of a religious theme.

== The murder of Parmenio ==
On 7 July 2001, Parmenio Medina was shot dead at the entrance of his home. This crime was perpetrated by hired killers, who fled the scene quickly in a gray Hyundai, police said.

The suspicions relating Calvo to the crime were confirmed when he was arrested on charges of masterminding the crime, along with businessman Omar Chávez.

Parmenio Medina's murder was heavily covered and discussed in Costa Rica. Partly this was because of the direct involvement of a notorious Catholic priest in a country with a heavy Roman Catholic majority. It was also the first murder of a journalist in Costa Rica, and thus a direct challenge to the country's freedom of expression.

=== Some figures of the trial ===
- 9 volumes of court records (one for each suspect)
- 91 cassettes, product of wiretaps
- 145 witnesses (some of which were attempts to coerce, attempt by one or more individuals, to modify a testimony that otherwise would be incriminating to these individuals)
- 803 documents of the Public Ministry (prosecutor of the state court) arguing the criminal case against the accused

On 18 December 2007, father Minor was sentenced to 15 years in prison for fraud in relation to the Catholic station Radio Maria de Guadalupe, but was acquitted of involvement in the murder of Parmenio Medina. Moreover, Omar Chávez was sentenced to 35 years in prison for the murder of Medina and 12 for fraud in relation to Radio Maria de Guadalupe, while another defendant was sentenced to 30 years for murder. In total, of the 9 accused, 6 were acquitted and 3 convicted, which had generated much controversy in the country.
