= Mekatelyu (band) =

Costa Rican band

- Origin: San José, Costa Rica
- Genres: Reggae
- Years active: 1998 to present

Mekatelyu is a Costa Rican band formed in December 1998 when Gabriel Dávila (Gabo), bassist of the band, began to search for a new style of music that would fuse reggae roots with different Caribbean and Latin rhythms.

== History ==
=== Origins ===
After a short time rehearsing, Mekatelyu debuted at the Youth Festival in Sabana, San José, Costa Rica, on February 6, 1999. The band began to play more regular concerts in the Costa Rican underground scene with ska and punk groups, including Mod — Ska, Garbanzos, El Guato, Teatromocracia, and others.

=== First album ===
Within four months of the band's formation they had recorded their first demo, Comin Nao. This demo was recorded by Gabo in the Creative Production studios and mixed by Leo León in Radio U's studios. The album tells a story using ten songs, fusing reggae with calypso, raggamuffin and ska. One of the albums' songs is "Amarily Love Reggae", which became the band's first radio success and reached number 1 at radio stations around the country. These songs were in Spanish and Limón Coastal Creole, and the themes of the songs include the high cost of living (as in "25 cañas"), spirituality (as in "Oh Jah Jah") and Limonense folklore (as in "La Farafa"). Álvaro Durán was in charge of cover design, and Eduardo Marenco of photography.

=== Increasing popularity ===
In October 1999 they signed a contract with Oscar Ortiz (Mr. Rasta), which gave them an opportunity to record their first music video for "Amarily Love Reggae". The video was filmed in Puerto Viejo, Cahuita and Limón by director Gustavo Castro and edited by Cristian Castro of TVA.

In March 2000 they were invited by Enrique Salgado to open a concert for The Wailers (of Bob Marley fame).

In June 2001 Mekatelyu signed a contract with record company D.D.M. in order to achieve a more professional level of promotion and distribution. This led an upgraded version of their demo Comin Nao (adding winds, percussion, and dubs).

In July 2001 they were invited to the Youth Festival in Panama, and in August 2002 they traveled to Spain and Portugal for a tour, playing over thirty concerts in locations such as Madrid, Extremadura, Valencia, Murcia, Cuenca, Albacete and Burgos. In addition, they did promotional work in Barcelona and Italy.

=== Second album ===
In February 2002 Mekatelyu presented their second production to the public, Entre Raices. This was a more mature and elaborate album that mixed cumbia, soca and Latin elements. The album combines many musical, spiritual, and compositional influences, giving listeners a new approach to Latin roots music. The album cover was a concept of Mauricio Ariza and Gabriel Dávila and the graphics were designed by Luis Enrique Vega. This album was recorded at GB Productions by Adrián Blando and "Paren Paren" in the Mix Studios by Allan Murillo. At the premier party for this album, sister bands Los Cafres, Gondwana, and Cultura Profetica were present and performed on stage together.

On this album is their biggest hit yet, "Paren Paren", which reached number one on the most important radio charts in the country, and maintained this position for many weeks. This song was promoted one year later with a video by percussionist Mauricio Ariza and Francisco Guerrero which contained images of street and police violence, poverty, urban folklore, and scenes from a concert, all through the eyes of a child. The video was dedicated to journalist Parmenio Medina, who was assassinated for exposing corruption.

Currently, the disc is being distributed widely in Central America and Mexico, and the band is working on recompilations with other bands as Las 11 de 911, Bomba Latina 2, and Rockfest. Mekatelyu has also been chosen to open for various internationally renowned bands including The Wailers, Alpha Blondy and the Solar System, Pericos, Non Palidece, Resistencia Suburbana, Johnnydread, and Rabanes. They are currently working on projects with Pablito Molina and Fidel Nadal of Lumumba y Todos Tus Muertos.

== Band members ==
Initially, Gabo brought together Johnny Akent (Johnnyman) for vocals and clarinet, Pablo Oporta on the drums, Olman Arroya on percussion, and Mario Corrales on electric guitar. In April 1999 Gregory Barcía (Goyo) entered the band as a new guitarist, bringing a new feeling to the group.

In March 2000 Mekatelyu displayed a new format with the addition of 3 band members, Carlos Quesada (Quesadita) on the trombone, Vladimir Bolaños on the alto saxophone and César Sandí on percussion.

At the end of 2000 Mekatelyu made a few changes in their alignment, and added Gerardo Soto on drums and Mauricio Ariza on percussion. In 2001 Mario Vega was added on trumpet and Manuel Dávila on keyboard, giving the band a more professional sound.

Near the end of 2002 Jorge Sobrado was added on drums and Camilo Poltronieri (from the band Inconsciente Colectivo) on guitar, adding a more definitive sound.
