= Antonio Troyo Calderón =

Costa Rican prelate

- Titular Bishop of Burca
- Church: Roman Catholic Church
- See: Titular See of Burca
- In office: September 21, 1979
- Predecessor: Luis Morales Reyes
- Successor: Incumbent
- Previous post(s): Prelate

Orders
- Ordination: November 30, 1947
- Consecration: September 21, 1979 by Román Arrieta Villalobos

Personal details
- Born: October 18, 1923; Cartago, Costa Rica
- Died: December 1, 2015 (aged 92)

Antonio Troyo Calderón (October 18, 1923 – December 1, 2015) was a Costa Rican Prelate of the Catholic Church.

Troyo Calderón was born in Cartago and was ordained a priest on November 30, 1947. Calderón was appointed auxiliary bishop to the Archdiocese of San José de Costa Rica on August 27, 1979, as well as titular bishop of Burca, and ordained bishop September 21, 1979, by Román Arrieta Villalobos, Archbishop of San José. Troyo Calderón retired from the archdiocese of San José de Costa Rica on July 13, 2002. He died in December 2015, at the age of 92.
