= Héctor Morera Vega =

Costa Rican Roman Catholic bishop

- Bishop of Tilarán
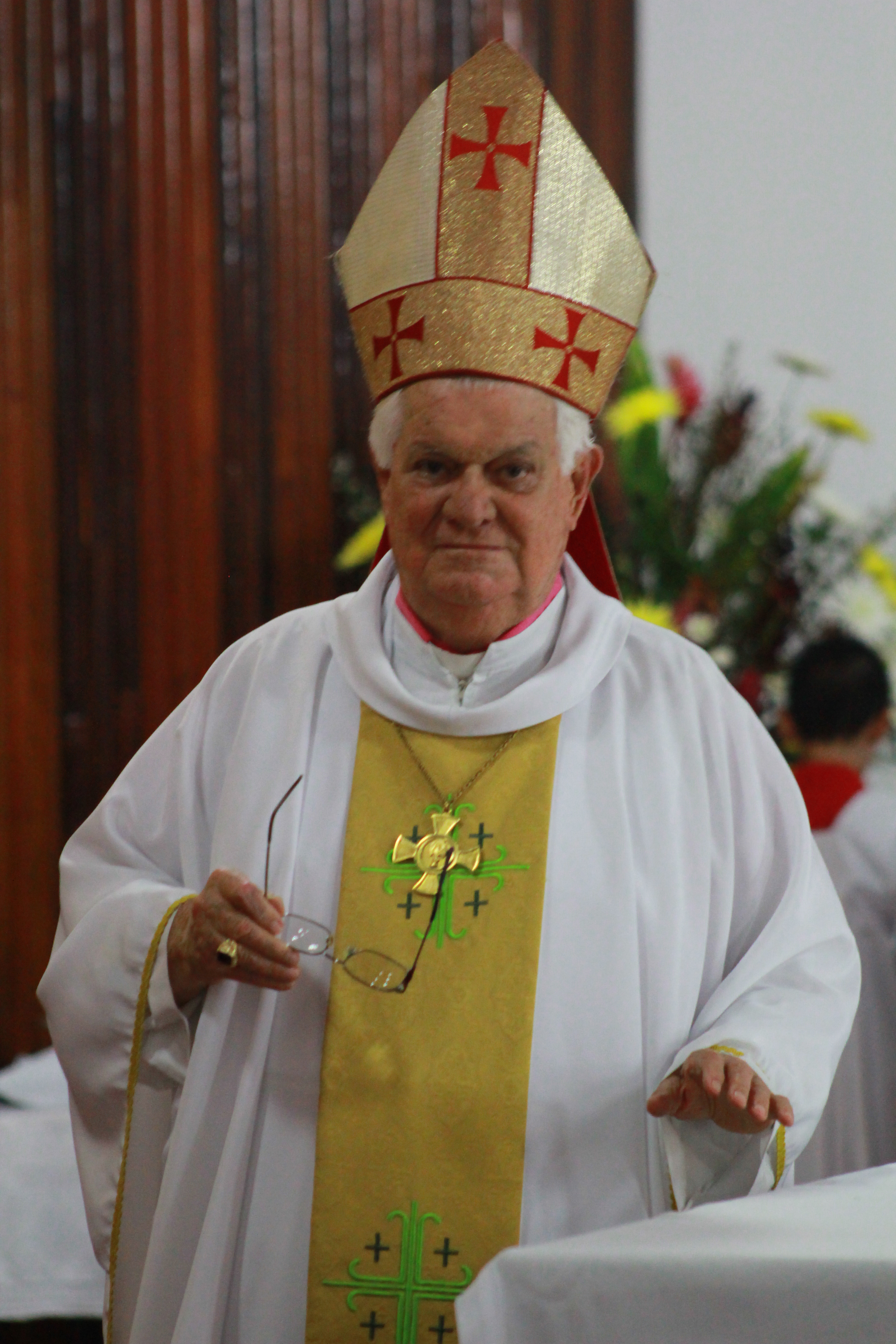
- Héctor Morera Vega in 2013
- Church: Catholic Church
- Diocese: Diocese of Tilarán
- In office: 4 December 1979 – 13 July 2002
- Predecessor: Román Arrieta Villalobos
- Successor: Vittorino Girardi

Orders
- Ordination: 17 December 1949
- Consecration: 27 December 1979 by Román Arrieta Villalobos

Personal details
- Born: 20 February 1926 Palmares, Alajuela Province, Costa Rica
- Died: 23 December 2017 (aged 91) Tilarán, Guanacaste Province, Costa Rica

Monseñor Héctor Morera Vega (20 February 1926 – 23 December 2017) was a Catholic bishop.

Morera Vega was ordained to the priesthood in 1949. He served as bishop of the Diocese of Tilaran, Costa Rica from 1979 to 2002. He died on 23 December 2017, aged 91.
