= Ignacio Trejos Picado =

Costa Rican Catholic bishop (born 1928)

The Most Reverend Ignacio Trejos Picado
- Bishop Emeritus of Diocese of San Isidro de El General
- Diocese: Diocese of San Isidro de El General
- Appointed: 22 December 1974
- Term ended: 31 July 2003
- Predecessor: Delfín Quesada Castro
- Successor: Guillermo Loría Garita

Orders
- Ordination: 8 March 1952
- Consecration: 8 March 1968 by Paulino Limongi

Personal details
- Born: 31 July 1928 (age 98) Guadalupe de Cartago, Costa Rica
- Denomination: Catholic Church

Ignacio Nazareno Trejos Picado (born 31 July 1928) is a Costa Rican prelate of the Catholic Church who served as the second bishop of the Diocese of San Isidro de El General from 1974 until his retirement in 2003.

== Early life and priesthood ==
Ignacio Trejos Picado was born on 31 July 1928 in Guadalupe de Cartago, Costa Rica. He entered the seminary in 1946 and later continued his theological studies in Rome. Trejos Picado was ordained to the priesthood on 8 March 1952 at the Pontifical Latin American College.

Following his ordination, he served in several pastoral and academic roles, including parish ministry and leadership positions within priestly formation in Costa Rica.

== Episcopal ministry ==
On 5 January 1968, Pope Paul VI appointed Trejos Picado as an auxiliary bishop of the Roman Catholic Archdiocese of San José de Costa Rica and titular bishop of Aquae Albae in Mauretania. He received episcopal consecration on 8 March 1968 from Apostolic Nuncio Paulino Limongi, with Bishops Enrique Bolaños Quesada and Delfín Quesada Castro as co-consecrators.

Following the death of Bishop Delfín Quesada Castro, Trejos Picado was appointed Bishop of San Isidro de El General on 22 December 1974, taking canonical possession of the diocese in January 1975. During his episcopate, he guided the diocese through a period of institutional consolidation, promoted vocations, expanded parish structures, and strengthened pastoral outreach in southern Costa Rica.

== Retirement ==
Upon reaching the age required by canon law, Trejos Picado submitted his resignation as diocesan bishop. Pope John Paul II accepted his resignation on 31 July 2003, in accordance with Canon 401 §1 of the Code of Canon Law.

== See also ==
- Catholic Church in Costa Rica
- Roman Catholic Diocese of San Isidro de El General
