= Rakušan =

Rakušan (Czech pronunciation: [ˈrakuʃan]) is a Czech surname that literally means "Austrian". Notable people with the surname include:

- Bob Rakušan (born 1948), Czech artist
- Vít Rakušan (born 1978), Czech pedagogue and politician
