= Episcopal Conference of Costa Rica =

Assembly of Catholic bishops

The Episcopal Conference of Costa Rica (Spanish: Conferencia Episcopal de Costa Rica), consisting of the Bishops of Costa Rica, is a permanent institution, with the approval of the Holy See, to signify the collegial spirit and live, study and solve problems together ecclesial interest collaboration, and promote the greater good which the Church seeks to humanity, through the various means and modes of ministry approved by the Church. Its history dates back to the Bull Praedecessorum, Benedict XV, February 16, 1921, erected the ecclesiastical province of Costa Rica. The bishops of the Episcopal Conference members are in charge of the Metropolitan Archdiocese of San José and the Diocese of Cartago, Alajuela, San Isidro del General, Ciudad Quesada, Tilarán, Puntarenas and Limón.

== Establishment ==
Archbishop Hugo Barrantes Ureña (chairman), Archbishop of the Archdiocese of San José

Monsignor Angel Sancasimiro Fernandez, Diocesan Bishop of Alajuela

Monsignor Guillermo Loria Garita, Diocesan Bishop of San Isidro de El General

Monsignor Vittorino Girardi Stellin, Diocesan Bishop of Tilarán

Bishop José Rafael Quiros Quiros, Diocesan Bishop of Limon

Monsignor Brenes Oswaldo Alvarez, Bishop of the Diocese of Ciudad Quesada

Monsignor Óscar Fernández Guillén, diocesan bishop of Puntarenas

Bishop José Francisco Ulloa Rojas, Diocesan Bishop of Carthage

== See also ==
- Catholic Church in Costa Rica
