= José Rafael Quirós Quirós =

Archbishop of San José since 2013

The Most Reverend José Rafael Quirós
- Archbishop of San José de Costa Rica
- Church: Catholic Church
- Archdiocese: Archdiocese of San José de Costa Rica
- Appointed: 29 June 2013
- Installed: 4 July 2013
- Predecessor: Hugo Barrantes Ureña
- Previous posts: Bishop of Limón (2005‍–‍2013); Vicar General of San José (2002‍–‍2006)

Orders
- Ordination: 5 March 1981 by Román Arrieta Villalobos
- Consecration: 22 February 2006 by Hugo Barrantes Ureña

Personal details
- Born: José Rafael Quirós Quirós; 1 May 1955 (age 71) San Rafael, Costa Rica
- Education: Pontifical Gregorian University
- Motto: Ofrenda permanente (Spanish for 'Permanent offerings')
- Styles
- Reference style: His Excellency
- Spoken style: Your Excellency
- Religious style: Monsignor

José Rafael Quirós Quirós (born 1 May 1955) is a Costa Rican Catholic prelate who has served as the seventh Archbishop of San José since 2013. He previously served as Bishop of Limón from 2005 to 2013 and as Vicar General of the Archdiocese of San José from 2002 to 2006.

Ordained to the priesthood in 1981, Quirós combined parish ministry with a long career in seminary education. For seventeen years he taught canon law at the Central Seminary of Costa Rica and the Anselmo Llorente y Lafuente Catholic University, while also serving for nearly two decades in the Ecclesiastical Tribunal of Costa Rica, including as judicial vicar from 1989 to 2002.

Appointed Bishop of Limón by Pope Benedict XVI in 2005, he received episcopal ordination in 2006 and governed the diocese until 2013. Pope Francis subsequently appointed him Archbishop of San José, making him the senior prelate of Costa Rica's largest and most populous Catholic jurisdiction.

== Early life and ecclesiastical career (1955–2006) ==
José Rafael Quirós Quirós was born on 1 May 1955 in Llano Grande de Cartago, as the son of Tomas Quirós Leitón and Adoración Quirós Cubero. He completed his primary education at the Llano Grande Mixed School (1962–1967) and his secondary education at the Minor Seminary of Tres Ríos (1968–1972).

From 1973 to 1980, Quirós studied philosophy and theology at the Central Seminary of Costa Rica. He was ordained a priest on 5 March 1981 in the Metropolitan Cathedral of San José. Between 1982 and 1984, he pursued advanced studies in Rome, obtaining a Licentiate in Canon Law from the Pontifical Gregorian University.

Following his ordination, Quirós served as parochial vicar of St. Thérèse of the Child Jesus Parish in San José from 1981 to 1982. After completing his studies in Rome, he was appointed parochial vicar of Our Lady of Mount Carmel Parish in San José, where he served from 1984 to 1985.

He subsequently combined pastoral ministry with academic and judicial responsibilities. From 1985 to 1993, he served as a formator and professor of canon law at the Central Seminary of Costa Rica, and from 1993 to 2002 he taught canon law at the Anselmo Llorente y Lafuente Catholic University. He was assistant judicial vicar of the Ecclesiastical Tribunal of Costa Rica from 1985 to 1989 and judicial vicar from 1989 to 2002. Between 1995 and 1997, he also served as chaplain of the Public Force.

Quirós participated in the Fifth Archdiocesan Synod of San José in 1984, serving on the drafting committee during its concluding sessions. In 1998 and 1999, he was executive director of the Secretariat of the Costa Rican Episcopal Conference. During the same period, he directed the Patriarch Saint Joseph Pastoral Animation Center in Ulloa, Heredia.

Between 1999 and 2002, he served as parish priest of Saint Joseph the Patriarch Parish in Ulloa. He later participated as an expert in the Second Synod of Alajuela in 2000. In 2002, Archbishop Hugo Barrantes Ureña appointed him Vicar General and Moderator of the Curia of the Archdiocese of San José, positions he held until his consecration to the episcopate in 2006.

== Bishop of Limón (2006–2013) ==
On 2 December 2005, Pope Benedict XVI appointed Quirós as the second Bishop of Limón. He received episcopal consecration on 22 February 2006 and governed the diocese until 2013.

During his episcopate, he also held several responsibilities within the Costa Rican Episcopal Conference, including serving as president of the National Commissions for Tourism Ministry, Youth Ministry, and Communications, as well as treasurer of the conference. At the regional level, he served on the Communications Department of the Latin American and Caribbean Episcopal Council (CELAM) and was responsible for that area in the Mexico and Central America region from 2011 to 2014.

== Archbishop of San José (2013–present) ==
Following the resignation of Archbishop Hugo Barrantes Ureña, Pope Francis appointed Quirós Archbishop of San José on 4 May 2013. He took canonical possession of the archdiocese on 29 June 2013 and has served as its archbishop since then.

As archbishop, Quirós has overseen the pastoral administration of Costa Rica's largest archdiocese and has continued to participate in the work of the Costa Rican Episcopal Conference and regional ecclesiastical organizations.

In August 2022, a Costa Rican civil court found Quirós, together with the Archdiocese of San José and the Episcopal Conference of Costa Rica, liable in a first-instance judgment for damages related to the handling of allegations against former priest Mauricio Víquez, who had previously been convicted of sexual abuse. The ruling ordered the payment of compensation to one of the victims. The case received significant public attention and formed part of broader scrutiny of the Catholic Church's response to clerical sexual abuse in the country.
