= Antonio del Carmen Monestel Zamora =

Antonio del Carmen Monestel Zamora (1868–1937) was the first bishop of the Roman Catholic Diocese of Alajuela.

Monestel was a native of San Jose, Costa Rica. Monestel studied in Rome, and was ordained a priest in 1891. He served in various parishes as a parish priest, before serving in administrative positions with the Diocese of San Jose and then becoming Bishop of Alajuela.

== Sources ==
- article on Diocese of Alajuela^{[usurped]}
