= Preisinger =

Preisinger (German and Swiss German: habitational name for someone from Preising in Bavaria or Austria) is a surname. Notable people with the surname include:

- Michael Preisinger (born 1962), German journalist, author, and TV host
- Miroslav Preisinger (born 1991), Slovak ice hockey player
- Sándor Preisinger (born 1973), Hungarian footballer

== See also ==
- Presinger
