= Alajuela Cathedral =

Coordinates: 10.01674°N 84.21293°W

Our Lady of the Pillar Cathedral
- Catedral de Nuestra Señora del Pilar
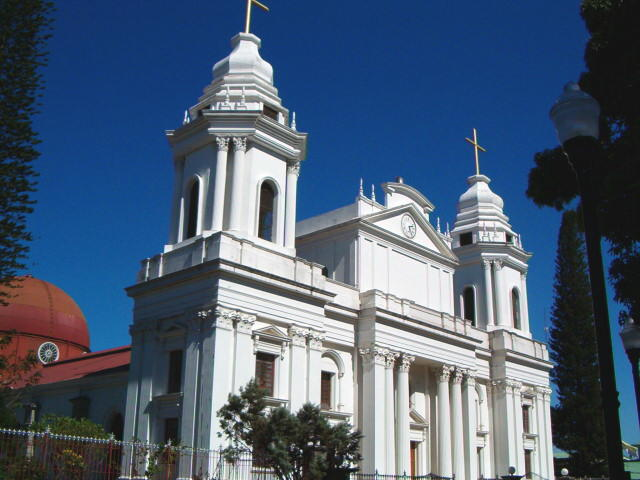
- Our Lady of the Pillar Cathedral
- Location: Alajuela
- Country: Costa Rica
- Denomination: Roman Catholic Church

The Our Lady of the Pillar Cathedral (Spanish: Catedral de Nuestra Señora del Pilar ) also called Alajuela Cathedral or Cathedral of Virgin of the Pillar, is a religious building affiliated with the Catholic Church, which is located in the city of Alajuela, the second largest in the Central American country of Costa Rica.

It is a temple that follows the Roman or Latin rite and is the mother of the Diocese of Alajuela (Dioecesis Alaiuelensis) which was created in 1921 by bull "Praedecessorum Nostrorum" of Pope Benedict XV.

The current building has its origins in a small chapel built in 1782 not far from its current location. A new structure designed by Gustavo Casallini began to be built in 1854 but was stopped shortly after due to war so the opening and consecration was delayed until 1863. Between 1946 and 1967 it was subjected to intense remodeling.

== See also ==
- Catholic Church in Costa Rica
- Our Lady of the Pillar

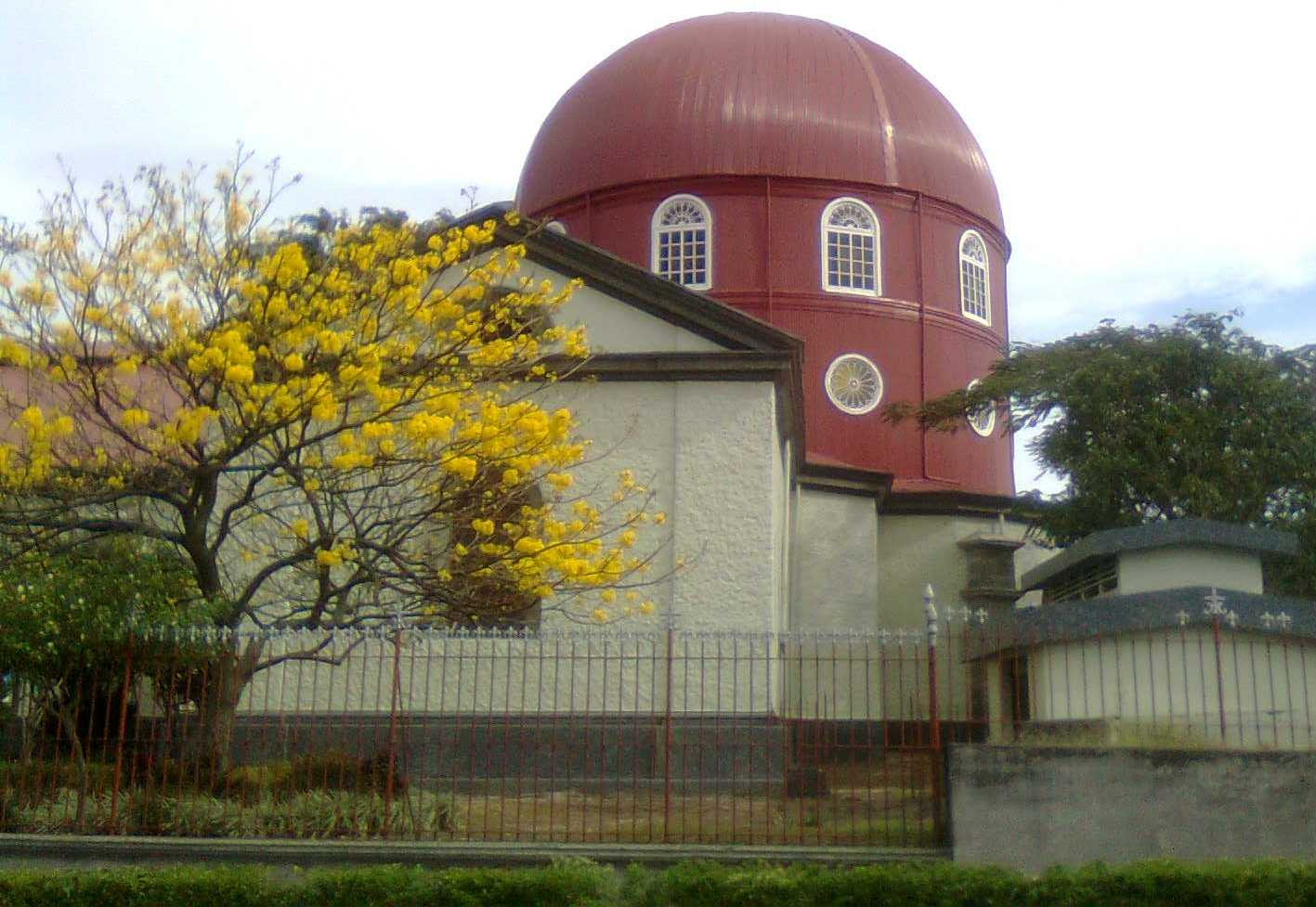
Dome of the Cathedral
