= Diocese of San Isidro de El General =

Latin Catholic ecclesiastical jurisdiction in Costa Rica

Coordinates: 9.3736°N 83.7023°W

Diocese of San Isidro de El General Dioecesis Sancti Isidori Diócesis de San Isidro de El General
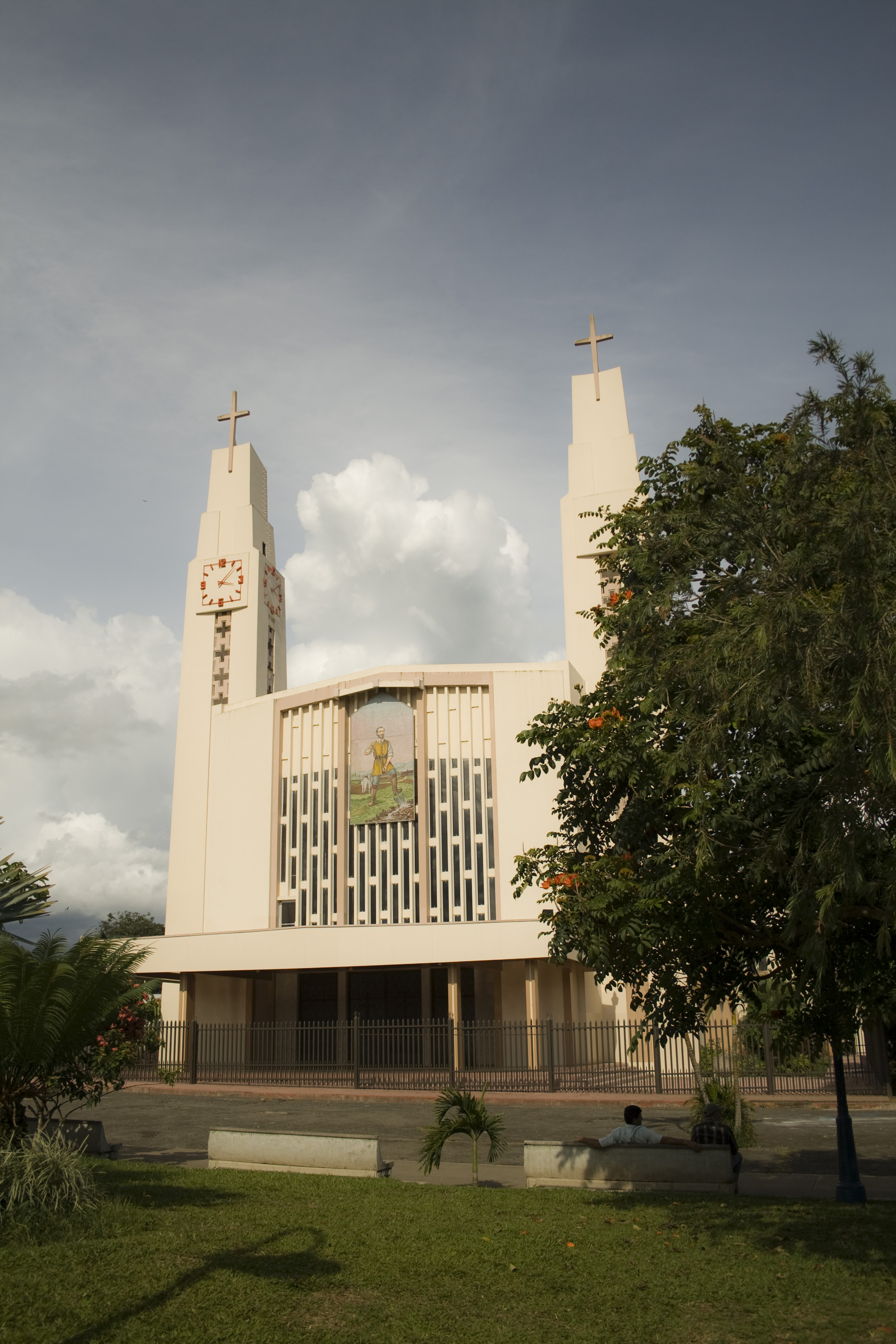
- Catedral de San Isidro Labrador

Location
- Country: Costa Rica
- Ecclesiastical province: Province of San José de Costa Rica
- Metropolitan: José Rafael Quirós Quirós

Statistics
- Area: 10,346 km^{2} (3,995 sq mi)
- Population: Total; Catholics: (as of 2010); 369,000; 359,000 (97.3%)
- Parishes: 26

Information
- Denomination: Catholic Church
- Sui iuris church: Latin Church
- Rite: Roman Rite
- Established: 19 August 1954 (71 years ago)
- Cathedral: Cathedral of St. Isidore

Current leadership
- Pope: Leo XIV
- Bishop: Juan Miguel Castro Rojas
- Bishops emeritus: Ignacio Nazareno Trejos Picado; Guillermo Loría Garita; Gabriel Enrique Montero Umaña, O.F.M. Conv.

Map
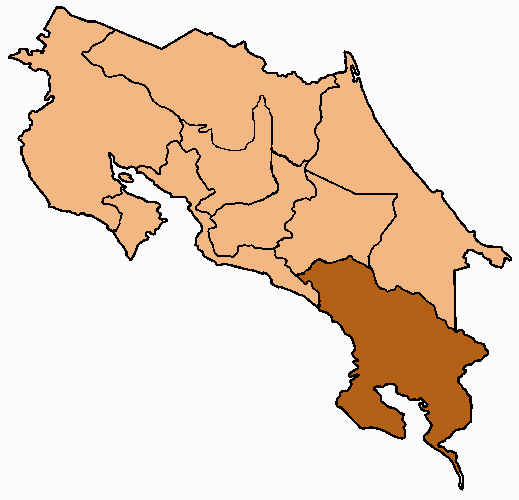

The Diocese of San Isidro de El General (Latin: Dioecesis Sancti Isidori is a Latin Church ecclesiastical territory or diocese of the Catholic Church in Costa Rica. It is a suffragan diocese in the ecclesiastical province of the metropolitan Archdiocese of San José de Costa Rica. It was erected as a diocese on 19 August 1954.

== Bishops ==
=== Ordinaries ===
- Delfín Quesada Castro (1954−1974)
- Ignacio Nazareno Trejos Picado (1974−2003)
- Guillermo Loría Garita (2003−2013)
- Gabriel Enrique Montero Umaña, O.F.M. Conv. (2013–2021)
- Juan Miguel Castro Rojas (2021–present)

=== Other priest of this diocese who became bishop ===
- Hugo Barrantes Ureña, appointed Bishop of Puntarenas in 1998

== Territorial losses ==
Year	Along with	To form
1998	Diocese of Tilarán	Diocese of Puntarenas
