= Oswaldo Brenes Álvarez =

Costa Rican Roman Catholic bishop

- Bishop of Ciudad Quesada
- Church: Catholic Church
- Diocese: Diocese of Ciudad Quesada
- In office: 19 March 2008 – 31 December 2012
- Predecessor: Ángel San Casimiro Fernández
- Successor: José Manuel Garita

Orders
- Ordination: 18 December 1966
- Consecration: 24 May 2008 by Osvaldo Padilla

Personal details
- Born: 5 August 1942 Liberia, Guanacaste Province, Costa Rica
- Died: 11 February 2013 (aged 70)

Oswaldo Brenes Álvarez (5 August 1942 – 11 February 2013) was the Roman Catholic bishop of the Diocese of Ciudad Quesada, Costa Rica.

Ordained to the priesthood in 1942, Brenes Álvarez was named bishop in 2008 and resigned in 2012.
