= Preminger =

Preminger (Hebrew: פרמינגר) is a surname of Jewish origin. Notable people with the surname include:

- Eliezer Preminger (1920–2001), Israeli politician
- Erik Lee Preminger (born 1944), American writer and actor
- Ingo Preminger (1911–2006), American film producer
- Noah Preminger (born 1986), American musician
- Otto Preminger (1905–1986), American film director
- Tanya Preminger (born 1945), Israeli sculptor
