= Bob Rakušan =

Czech artist

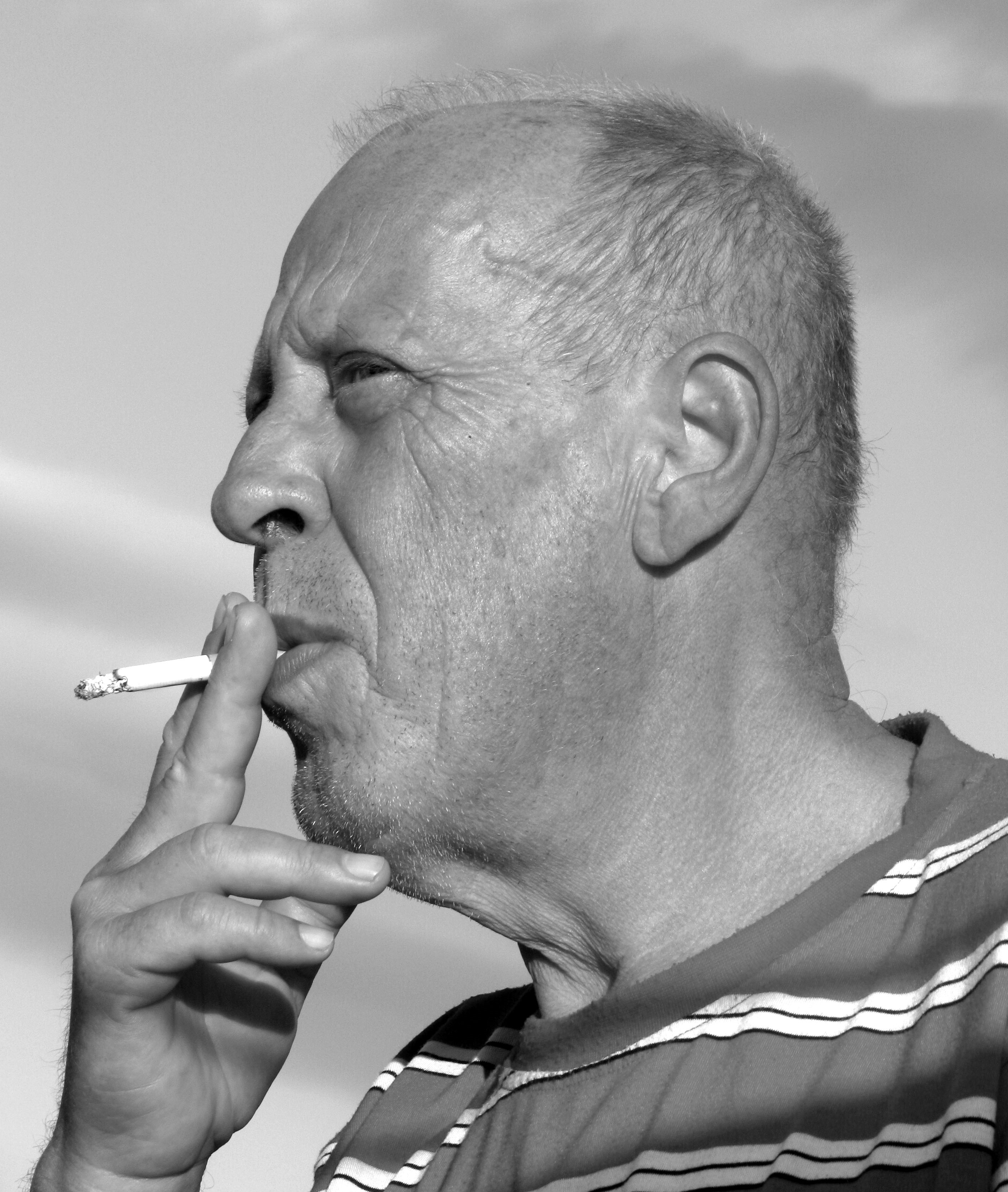
- Born: 6 February 1948 (age 78); Prague, Czech Republic
- Known for: Painting, drawing

Bob Rakušan (born 6 February 1948, Prague) is a Czech contemporary artist, who creates large-fired enamel works on black steel plate, scrap and salvaged objects, such as stove tops and ovens. The foundation layers of the enamel are often built on screen techniques inspired by the printing process. His work is rooted in drawings, studies and graphic prints. Besides landscapes and abstract and figurative composition, there is a recurring ocean theme in his works, inspired by his longtime occupation as a captain of sailing ships.

== Career ==
From 1966-68 Rakušan spent two years studying figurative drawing and painting in the studio of Professor Frantisek Nedved. He also studied expressive painting, with materials including charcoal, ink and pastel. At the same time he was also studying at the Academy of Arts, Architecture and Design in Prague, where his professors included Josef Novak, František Muzika, and later Milan Hegar.

In 1969, Rakušan left the Czech Republic on a short assignment to a ceramics factory in West Germany to produce designs for Keramik Fabrik Schardt in Rheinbach, resulting in a thematic series of ceramic design templates. During this period he also began composing large and small scale mosaic pieces for private collectors. At the end of this assignment Rakušan had an individual exhibition in Bonn at the Opel Autosalon Bachem, his first independent show. The success of the show resulted in a two-month delay to his return to university, which had adverse consequences for his studies.

In 1973, after finishing his studies, Rakušan focused on commercial illustration and graphic arts for a number of magazines, book publishers and companies, creating posters, logos, advertising and book designs, and illustrations for children, while also exhibiting work in Jaroslav Fragner's gallery.

At the end of the seventies, after the birth of his first son David, Rakušan returned to formal and independent art. A major turning point in his career was a group exhibition titled Mult in Copenhagen in 1981, in which his work was juxtaposed and contrasted with pop art and avant-garde. The contrast had a strong impact on Rakušan that significantly altered the theme and composition of his future work. The birth of his second son Luke in 1983 forced Rakušan to focus on commercial endeavours, such as magazine graphics and illustration work.

Beginning in 1988, the artist returned to his work full-time. In the interim period Rakušan had gained experience with serigraphic and other kinds of printing, which informed his technique. He also started producing his early enamel work, exhibiting a collection of these at the Salon of Prague Artists in the Park of Culture and Leisure (Czech: Park kultury an oddechu).

== Large enamel firing technique ==
The final exhibition of his graphic work took place in 1989 at the graphics Salon of Applied Arts in Prague, in the Culture and Leisure Park. In 1988, the entry into his enamel phase was marked by a group exhibition: New Painting in the Student House of Czech Technical University in Prague. During this time and until the end of 1990, Rakušan's work was also exhibited in a travelling exhibition through Germany (Höchst im Odenwald, Zweibrücken, Darmstadt). This exhibition of paintings and enamels gradually became more focused on enamel works, marking a shift to enamel fired works.

From 1992, the artist ceased artistic production and devoted himself to sailing for the next five years, captaining ships from Germany, Croatia, Italy, Sweden and France from 11 to 16 meters in length. Sailing, and the ocean, became a recurring theme in his later work after this period.

In 1997 he rededicated himself to artistic production, introducing new and modern techniques, primarily through the use of computer-aided graphic design. From 2012 to 2013, Solidet Gallery in Prague hosted a solo exhibition of Rakušan's original enamels and graphic prints.

== Gallery ==
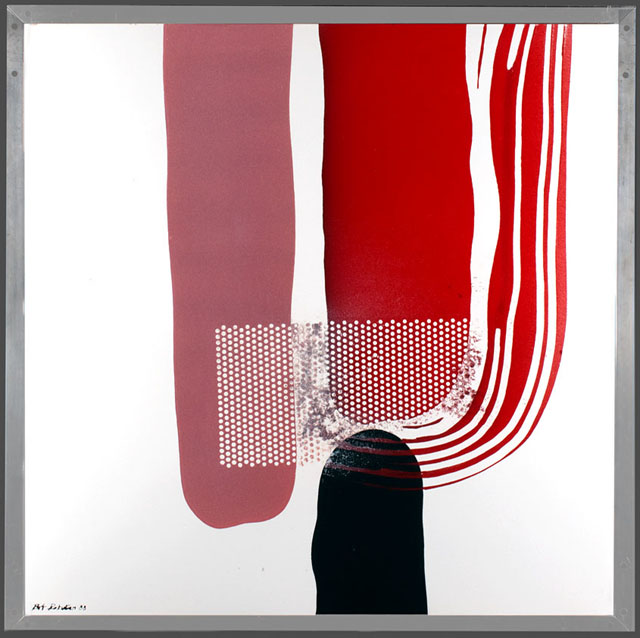
Warm relationship of two, not excluding a third one enamel on metal sheet, 80x80cm (1988)

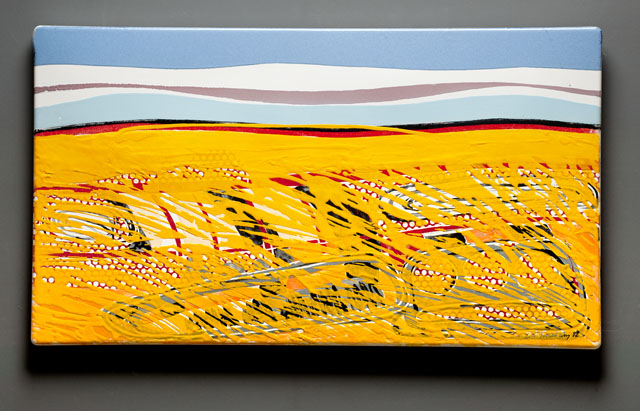
Field (a tribute to Van Gogh) enamel on metal sheet, 46x83cm (2012)

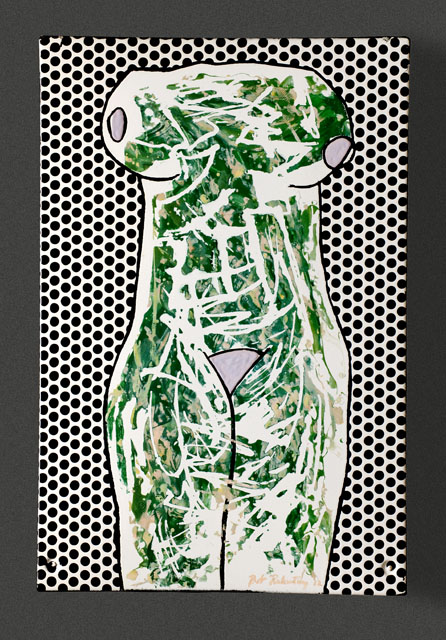
Masked torso enamel on metal sheet, 73x48cm (2012)

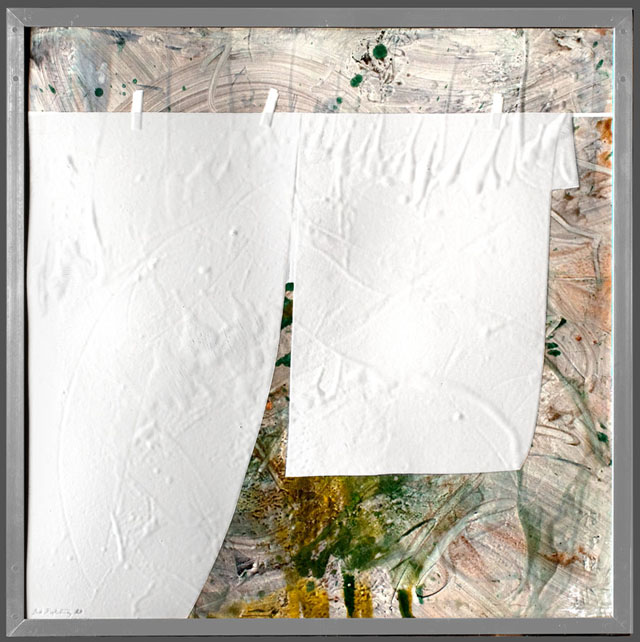
Linen enamel on metal sheet, 80x80cm (1988)

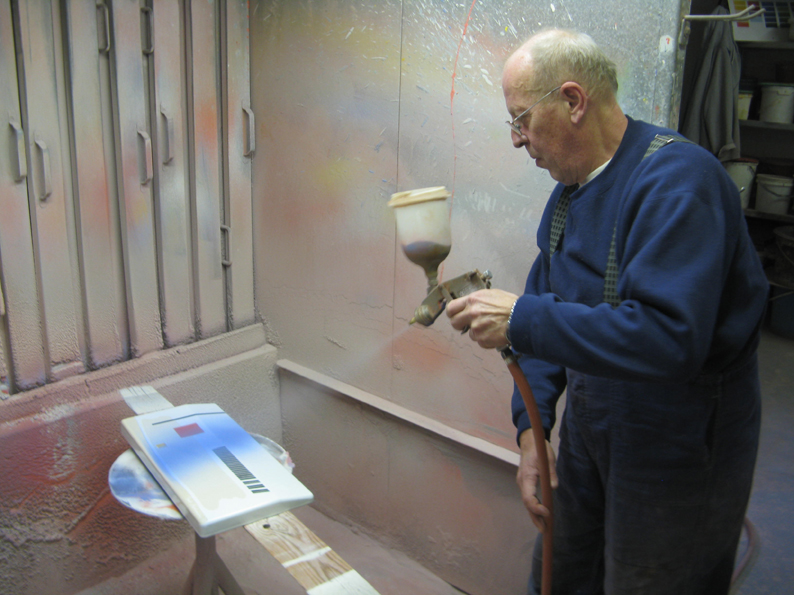
Spraying enamel Enamelling plant (2012)

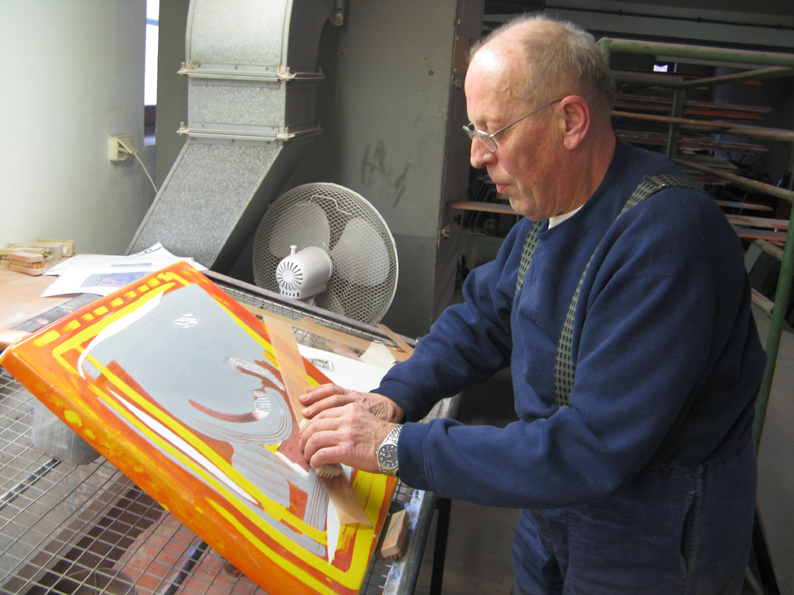
The patterning Enamelling plant (2012)
