= Diocese of Cartago in Costa Rica =

Latin Catholic ecclesiastical jurisdiction in Costa Rica

Coordinates: 9.8652°N 83.9222°W

Diocese of Cartago in Costa Rica Dioecesis Carthaginensis in Costa Rica Diócesis de Cartago

Location
- Country: Costa Rica
- Ecclesiastical province: Province of San José de Costa Rica
- Metropolitan: José Rafael Quirós

Statistics
- Area: 3,105 km^{2} (1,199 sq mi)
- Population: Total; Catholics: (as of 2005); 378,523; 272.388 (72%)
- Parishes: 36

Information
- Denomination: Catholic Church
- Sui iuris church: Latin Church
- Rite: Roman Rite
- Established: 24 May 2005 (20 years ago)
- Cathedral: Cathedral of Our Lady of Carmel

Current leadership
- Pope: Leo XIV
- Bishop: Mario Enrique Quirós Quirós

Map
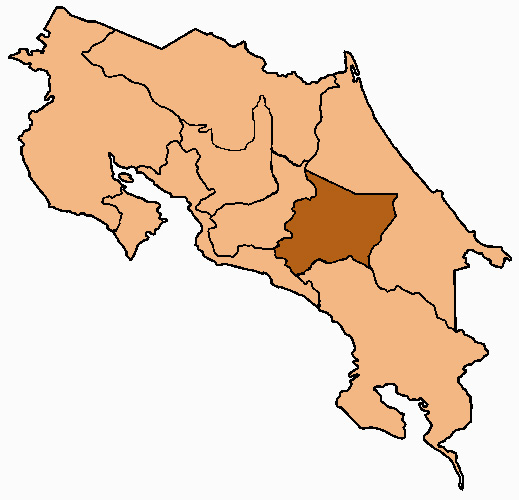

The Diocese of Cartago (Latin: Dioecesis Carthaginensis in Costa Rica) is a Latin Church ecclesiastical territory or diocese of the Catholic Church in Costa Rica. The Diocese of Cartago in Costa Rica is a suffragan diocese in the ecclesiastical province covering all Costa Rica of the metropolitan Archdiocese of San José de Costa Rica .

Its cathedral episcopal see is the Catedral de Nuestra Señora de El Carmen, dedicated to Our Lady of Carmel, in Cartago, Cartago province, central Costa Rica. It also has two Minor Basilicas: the Basílica de la Inmaculada Concepción, dedicated to the Immaculate Conception, in Tejar; and the Basílica de Nuestra Señora de Los Ángeles, dedicated to Our Lady of Angels, both in Cartago.

== History ==
Erected on 24 May 2005 as Diocese of Cartago (in Costa Rica), on territories split off from the metropolitan Archdiocese of San José (whose suffragan it became) and the Diocese of Limón.

== Statistics ==
As of 2014, it pastorally served 442,000 Catholics (90.0% of 491,000 total) on 1,252 km² in 39 parishes and 4 missions with 108 priests (75 diocesan, 33 religious), 154 lay religious (80 brothers, 74 sisters) and 36 seminarians.

== Episcopal ordinaries ==
Suffragan Bishops of Cartago (in Costa Rica)

- José Francisco Ulloa Rojas (24 May 2005 – retired 4 March 2017); previously Bishop of Limón (Costa Rica) (1994.12.30 – 2005.05.24), President of Episcopal Conference of Costa Rica (2002 – 2008.09), President of Episcopal Secretariat of Central America and Panama (2005.03 – 2011)
- Bishop-elect Mario Enrique Quirós Quirós (4 March 2017 – ...).

== See also ==
- Catholic Church in Costa Rica
- List of Catholic dioceses in Costa Rica
- Roman Catholic Diocese of Cartago in Colombia, diocese of the same name in Colombia

== Sources and external links ==
- GCatholic - data for all sections
- "Diocese of Cartago". Catholic-Hierarchy. ^{[self-published]}
