= Parmenio Medina =

Parmenio Medina Pérez
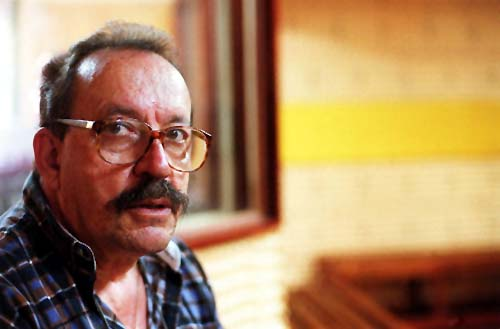
- Born: January 2, 1939; Medellín, Antioquia, Colombia
- Died: July 7, 2001 (aged 62); San Miguel de Santo Domingo, Heredia, Costa Rica
- Cause of death: Assassination by gunshots
- Resting place: Cementerio La Piedad; Desamparados, Costa Rica; 9.903618°N 84.070512°W
- Occupations: Radio broadcaster and journalist
- Spouse: Martha Castrillón
- Children: 5

Parmenio Medina Pérez (January 2, 1939 - July 7, 2001) was a Colombian radio broadcaster and journalist. He was a naturalized citizen of Costa Rica.

== Biography ==
Medina was a known as a critical journalist widely viewed as inconvenient for organizations accused of abuse or corruption such as the case of the 1979 Vuelta Ciclista a Costa Rica or a 1993 scandal about sport footwear imports. His journalistic work was focused on radio, mostly in journalistic investigations. For 28 years he directed the critical and comedic radio show "La Patada".

== Death ==
Due to the nature of his work he made several enemies in Costa Rica and often received death threats. On May 9, 2001 unknown gunmen had already shot his home with no injuries. On July 7, 2001, as he investigated catholic priest Minor Calvo for anomalies in his ownership and sale of the catholic radio station "Radio María", he was shot three times with a .38 caliber gun and killed near his house in San Miguel.

Parmenio Medina was also working on other cases before his death that were never broadcast. Since these were never known it is possible somebody took advantage of Calvo's notoriety and used him as a scapegoat.

=== Investigation ===
There was already some evidence linking Calvo with Colombian organized crime and there were suspicions of his involvement in the murder. On December 19, 2007, in Costa Rica's longest court trial to date, the entrepreneur Omar Chávez was convicted to 47 years in prison for fraud and as the mastermind behind the murder, priest Minor Calvo was convicted on fraud as ally of Chávez due to the proof Medina accumulated in his work before dying, and a Nicaraguan citizen by the name of Jaime "El Indio" Aguirre was convicted to 30 years in prison for the actual murder.

Parmenio Medina's murder was heavily covered and discussed in Costa Rica, partly because of the alleged involvement of a notorious Catholic priest (he was found not responsible) in a country with a heavy Roman Catholic majority. It was also the first murder of a journalist in Costa Rica, and thus a direct challenge to the country's freedom of expression and the status of the democracy of the Costarrican citizens, as well as the justice in this existing country. This case shocked the country so much that even the Costarrican rock band Inconsiente Colectivo wrote a song to the memory of this journalist called "Nunca Vencidos" (in English, "Never Defeated").
