= José Rafael Barquero Arce =

Costa Rican bishop (1931–2020)

José Rafael Barquero Arce (27 October 1931 – 29 November 2020) was a Costa Rican Roman Catholic bishop.

Barquero Arce was born in Costa Rica and was ordained to the priesthood in 1956. He served as titular bishop of 'Arindela' and was auxiliary bishop of the Roman Catholic Diocese of Alajuela, Costa Rica, from 1979 to 1980. He then served as bishop of the diocese from 1980 until 2007.
