= Agustín Blessing Presinger =

German priest and climber

Agustín Blessing Presinger C.M.
- Vicar Apostolic of Limón
- Church: Catholic Church
- See: Apostolic Vicariate of Limón
- In office: 16 December 1921 – 1 February 1934
- Predecessor: Vicariate established
- Successor: Karl Albert Wollgarten
- Other post: Titular Bishop of Tegea (1921-1934)

Orders
- Ordination: 24 February 1894
- Consecration: 1 May 1922 by Rafael Otón Castro Jiménez

Personal details
- Born: 11 May 1868 Treffelhausen (in present-day Böhmenkirch), Kingdom of Württemberg
- Died: 1 February 1934 (aged 65)

Agustín Blessing Presinger (11 May 1868 – 1 February 1934) was a German priest, bishop, and missionary. He was the first known European to reach to the summit of Mount Chirripó in 1904.

== Biography ==
Presinger was born on 11 May 1868. He became a priest on 24 February 1894. Presinger became the first to reach the peak of Mount Chirripó, the highest peak of Costa Rica, in 1904. He became Bishop of Limón on 1 May 1922, and died on 1 February 1934.
