= Diocese of Limón =

Latin Catholic ecclesiastical jurisdiction in Costa Rica

Coordinates: 9.9927°N 83.0309°W

Diocese of Limón Dioecesis Limonensis Diócesis de Limón
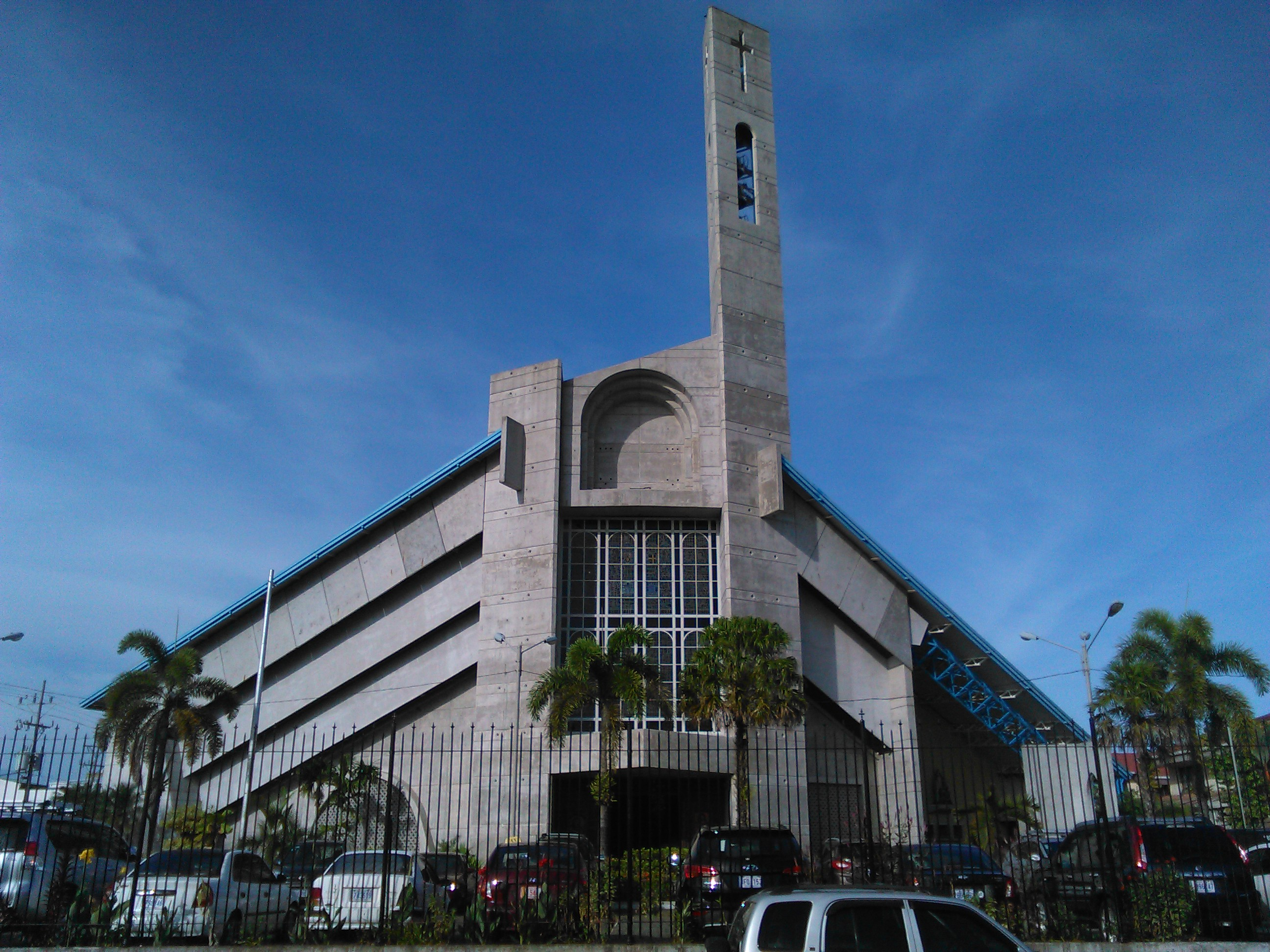
- Cathedral of Limón

Location
- Country: Costa Rica
- Ecclesiastical province: Province of San José de Costa Rica

Statistics
- Area: 10,835 km^{2} (4,183 sq mi)
- Population: Total; Catholics: (as of 2004); 446,912; 348,591 (78%)
- Parishes: 21

Information
- Denomination: Catholic Church
- Sui iuris church: Latin Church
- Rite: Roman Rite
- Established: 16 February 1921 (104 years ago)
- Cathedral: Cathedral of the Sacred Heart of Jesus

Current leadership
- Pope: Leo XIV
- Bishop: Javier Gerardo Román Arias

Map
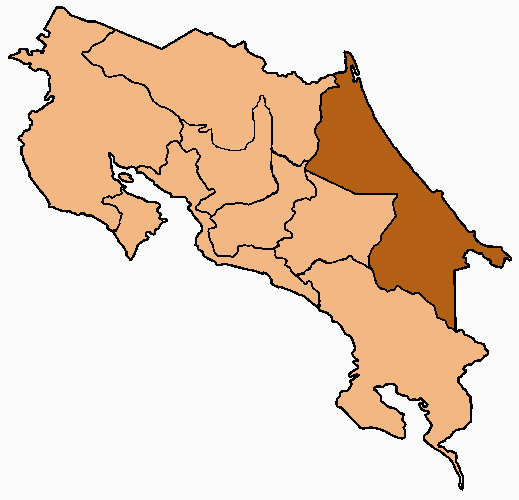

The Diocese of Limón is a Latin Church ecclesiastical territory or diocese of the Catholic Church in Costa Rica. It is a suffragan diocese in the ecclesiastical province of the metropolitan Archdiocese of San José de Costa Rica. It was erected 16 February 1921 as an apostolic vicariate, elevated to a diocese on 30 December 1994.

== Ordinaries ==
- Agustín Blessing Presinger, C.M. (1921–1934)
- Carlos Alberto Wollgarten, C.M. (1935–1937)
- Juan Paulo Odendahl Metz, C.M. (1938–1957)
- Alfonso Hoefer Hombach, C.M. (1958–1979)
- Alfonso Coto Monge (1980–1994)
- José Francisco Ulloa Rojas (1994–2005), appointed Bishop of Cartago
- José Rafael Quirós Quirós (2005–2013), appointed Archbishop of San José de Costa Rica
- Javier Gerardo Román Arias (2015–present)

== Territorial losses ==
Year	Along with	To form
2005	Archdiocese of San José de Costa Rica	Diocese of Cartago

== See also ==
- Catholic Church in Costa Rica
