= Carlos Humberto Rodríguez Quirós =

Costa Rican priest

- Archbishop of San José de Costa Rica
- Church: Catholic Church
- Archdiocese: Archdiocese of San José de Costa Rica
- In office: 5 May 1960 – 24 March 1979
- Predecessor: Rubén Odio Herrera
- Successor: Román Arrieta Villalobos

Orders
- Ordination: 25 October 1936
- Consecration: 26 May 1960 by Gennaro Verolino

Personal details
- Born: 21 April 1910 San José, Costa Rica
- Died: 23 July 1986 (aged 76) San José, Costa Rica
- Coat of arms

Carlos Humberto Rodríguez Quirós (April 21, 1910 – July 23, 1986) was a Costa Rican priest of the Catholic Church. Originally a Carthusian monk in Europe, he left that order and returned to Costa Rica, where he was named Archbishop of San José in 1960. He was relieved by the Vatican of the administration of the archdiocese in 1978, and he resigned in 1979.
