= Diocese of Ciudad Quesada =

Latin Catholic ecclesiastical jurisdiction in Costa Rica

Coordinates: 10.3233°N 84.4301°W

Diocese of Ciudad Quesada Dioecesis Civitatis Quesadensis Diócesis de Ciudad Quesada
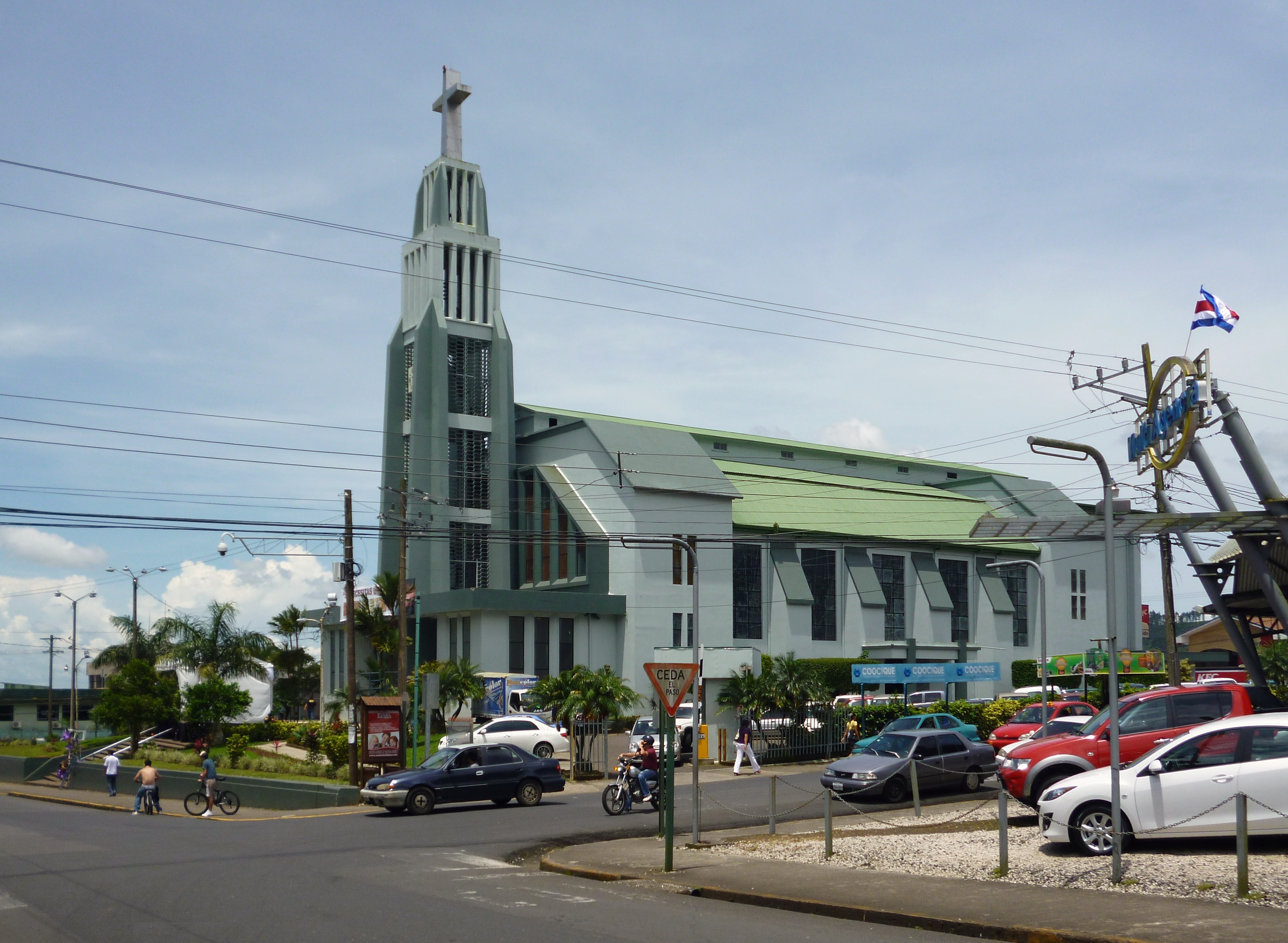
- Catedral San Carlos Borromeo

Location
- Country: Costa Rica
- Ecclesiastical province: Province of San José de Costa Rica
- Metropolitan: Hugo Barrantes Ureña

Statistics
- Area: 9,838 km^{2} (3,798 sq mi)
- Population: Total; Catholics: (as of 2006); 267,645; 214,116 (80%)
- Parishes: 18

Information
- Denomination: Catholic Church
- Sui iuris church: Latin Church
- Rite: Roman Rite
- Established: 25 July 1995 (30 years ago)
- Cathedral: Cathedral of St. Charles Borromeo

Current leadership
- Pope: Leo XIV
- Bishop: José Manuel Garita Herrera

Map
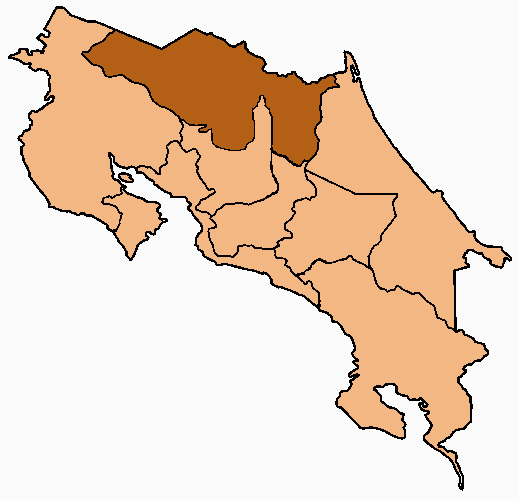

The Diocese of Ciudad Quesada is a Latin Church ecclesiastical territory or diocese of the Catholic Church in Costa Rica. It is a suffragan diocese in the ecclesiastical province of the metropolitan Archdiocese of San José de Costa Rica. the episcopal see is Ciudad Quesada (or, more simply, Quesada; alternatively known as San Carlos). Ciudad Quesada is the capital of the District of Ciudad Quesada, and of the larger Canton of San Carlos, which is in turn part of Alajuela Province. The diocese was erected on 25 July 1995.

On 31 December 2012, Pope Benedict XVI accepted the resignation of Bishop Oswaldo Brenes Álvarez from the pastoral governance of the diocese; there was no immediate replacement, so the diocese was a sede vacante (vacant see).

== Bishops ==
- Angel San Casimiro Fernández, O.A.R. (1995–2007), appointed Bishop of Alajuela
- Oswaldo Brenes Álvarez (2008–2012)
- José Manuel Garita Herrera (2014– )

== See also ==
- Catholic Church in Costa Rica
