= Archdiocese of San José de Costa Rica =

Latin Catholic ecclesiastical jurisdiction in Costa Rica

Coordinates: 9.9327°N 84.0788°W

Archdiocese of San José de Costa Rica Archidioecesis Sancti Iosephi in Costarica Arquidiócesis de San José
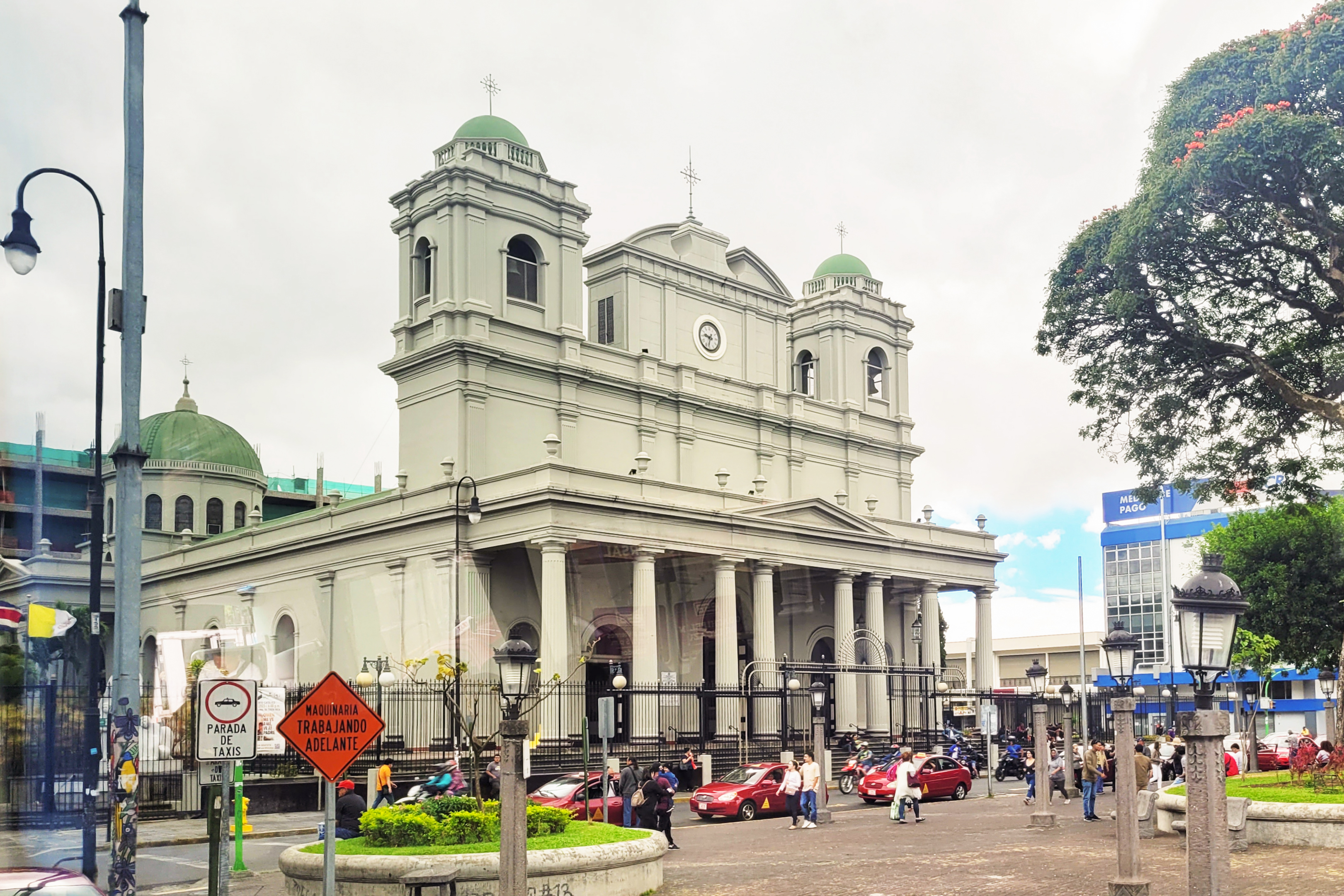
- The Metropolitan Cathedral of San José

Location
- Country: Costa Rica
- Ecclesiastical province: Province of San José de Costa Rica

Statistics
- Area: 2,208 km^{2} (853 sq mi)
- Population: Total; Catholics: (as of 2020); 2,138,345; 1,519,860 (71.1%)
- Parishes: 107

Information
- Denomination: Catholic Church
- Sui iuris church: Latin Church
- Rite: Roman Rite
- Established: 28 February 1850 (176 years ago)
- Cathedral: Metropolitan Cathedral of St. Joseph
- Secular priests: 260 (diocesan); 112 (Religious Orders); 21 Permanent Deacons

Current leadership
- Pope: Leo XIV
- Metropolitan Archbishop: José Rafael Quirós
- Auxiliary Bishops: Daniel Francisco Blanco Méndez

Map
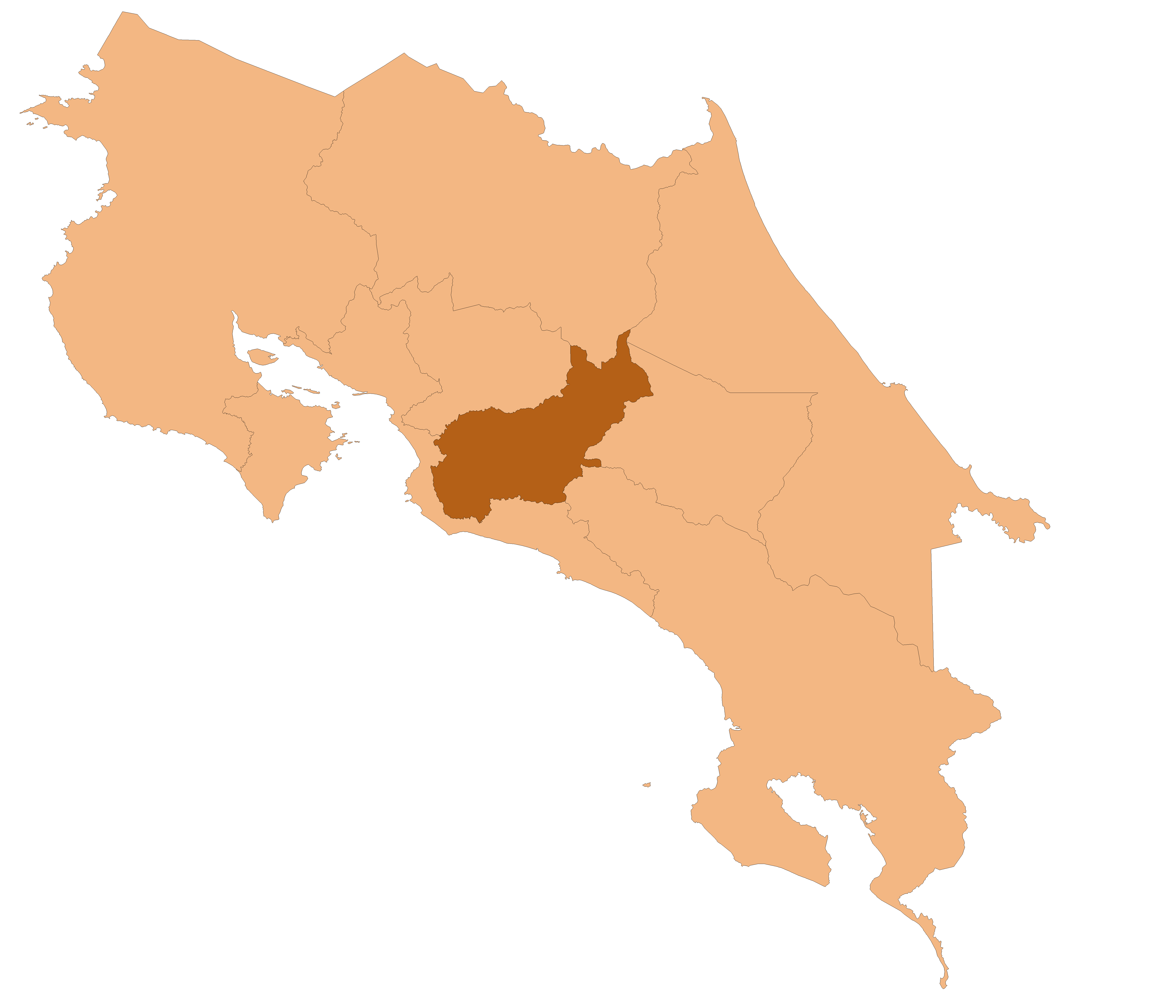

Website
- www.arquisanjose.org

The Archdiocese of San José de Costa Rica (Latin: Archidioecesis Sancti Iosephi in Costarica) is a Latin Church metropolitan see of the Catholic Church in Costa Rica. It is the country's sole metropolitan archdiocese and heads the Ecclesiastical Province of Costa Rica, which includes the suffragan dioceses of Alajuela, Cartago, Ciudad Quesada, Limón, Puntarenas, San Isidro de El General, and Tilarán-Liberia.

The archdiocese traces its origins to the Diocese of Costa Rica, erected on 28 February 1850 by Pope Pius IX. It was elevated to metropolitan archdiocesan status on 16 February 1921 by Pope Benedict XV with the establishment of the Ecclesiastical Province of Costa Rica.

The archiepiscopal see is the Metropolitan Cathedral of Saint Joseph in San José. Since 2013, the archdiocese has been led by Archbishop José Rafael Quirós Quirós.

== Bishops ==
=== Ordinaries ===
- Anselmo Llorente y La Fuente (1851–1871)
- Bernardo Augusto Thiel Hoffman (1880–1901)
- Juan Gaspar Stork Werth, C.M. (1904–1920)
- Rafael Otón Castro Jiménez (1921–1939)
- Víctor Manuel Sanabria Martínez (1940–1952)
- Rubén Odio Herrera (1952–1959)
- Carlos Humberto Rodríguez Quirós (1960–1979)
- Román Arrieta Villalobos (1979–2002)
- Hugo Barrantes Ureña (2002–2013)
- José Rafael Quirós Quirós (2013– )

=== Auxiliary bishops ===
- Ignacio Nazareno Trejos Picado (1968-1974), appointed Bishop of San Isidro de El General
- Antonio Troyo Calderón (1979-2002)
- Daniel Francisco Blanco Méndez (2017-

=== Other priests of this diocese who became bishops ===
- Antonio del Carmen Monestel y Zamora, appointed Coadjutor Bishop of Comayagua, Honduras in 1915
- Claudio María Volio y Jiménez, appointed Bishop of Santa Rosa de Copán, Honduras in 1916
- Vicente Juan Solís Fernández, appointed Bishop of Alajuela in 1940
- Alfonso Coto Monge, appointed Vicar Apostolic of Limón in 1980
- José Francisco Ulloa Rojas, appointed Bishop of Limón in 1994
- Oscar Gerardo Fernández Guillén, appointed Bishop of Puntarenas in 2003
- José Manuel Garita Herrera, appointed Bishop of Ciudad Quesada in 2014
- Javier Gerardo Román Arias, appointed Bishop of Limón in 2015
- Manuel Eugenio Salazar Mora, appointed Bishop of Tilarán-Liberia in 2016
- Mario Enrique Quirós Quirós (priest here, 1994-2005), appointed Bishop of Cartago in 2017

== Territorial losses ==
Year	Along with	To form
1921		Diocese of Alajuela
1921		Vicariate Apostolic of Limón
1954	Diocese of Alajuela	Diocese of San Isidro de El General
2005	Diocese of Limón	Diocese of Cartago

== See also ==
- Catholic Church in Costa Rica
- List of Roman Catholic dioceses in Costa Rica
