= Román Arrieta Villalobos =

Costa Rican Catholic archbishop (1924–2005)

His Excellency Román Arrieta Villalobos
- Archbishop Emeritus of San José de Costa Rica
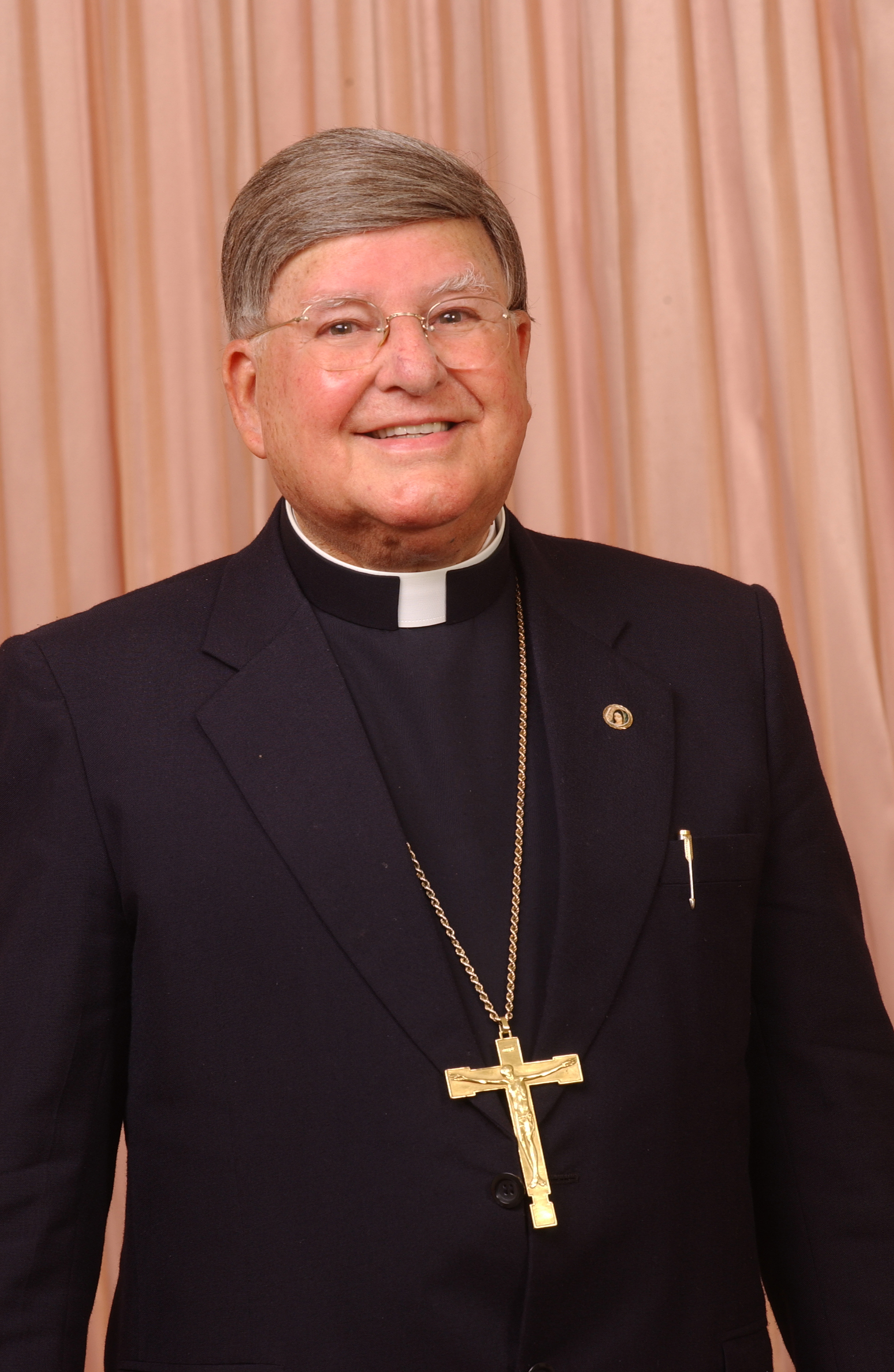
- Arrieta in 2004
- Archdiocese: San José de Costa Rica
- Appointed: 10 July 1979
- Term ended: 13 July 2002
- Predecessor: Carlos Humberto Rodríguez Quirós
- Successor: Hugo Barrantes Ureña
- Previous post: Bishop of Tilarán-Liberia (1961–1979)

Orders
- Ordination: 18 December 1948 by Víctor Manuel Sanabria Martínez
- Consecration: 21 September 1961 by Carlos Humberto Rodríguez Quirós

Personal details
- Born: Román Arrieta Villalobos; 13 November 1924 San Antonio, Belén, Costa Rica
- Died: 8 March 2005 (aged 80) La Ribera, Belén, Costa Rica
- Education: Catholic University of America

Styles of Román Arrieta Villalobos
- Reference style: His Excellency; The Most Reverend
- Spoken style: Your Excellency
- Religious style: Archbishop

Román Arrieta Villalobos, known as Manzanita (13 November 1924 – 8 March 2005), was a Catholic Archbishop in Costa Rica. He was born in San Antonio de Belén, Costa Rica, on November 13, 1924. He finished his secondary studies in Heredia before entering the Conciliar Seminary of San José, Costa Rica.

Ordained in the Metropolitan Cathedral of San José on December 18, 1948 by Mons. Víctor Manuel Sanabria Martínez and sent by him to Washington, D.C., to undertake his postgraduate studies. He was consecrated as first Bishop of Tilarán on September 21, 1961 at the Alajuela Cathedral. On July 10, 1979 he was appointed Archbishop of San José, a post he held until his resignation on July 13, 2002.

He took part in the Second Vatican Council where he was a member of the Commission on Canon Law.

He established the Minor Seminary of Tacares. He created a system of Social Security for the church employees, restored the Metropolitan Cathedral, and promoted the establishment of the Universidad Católica de Costa Rica.

He died in the home where he was born on March 7, 2004.
