= Metropolitan Cathedral of San José =

Coordinates: 9.9327°N 84.0788°W

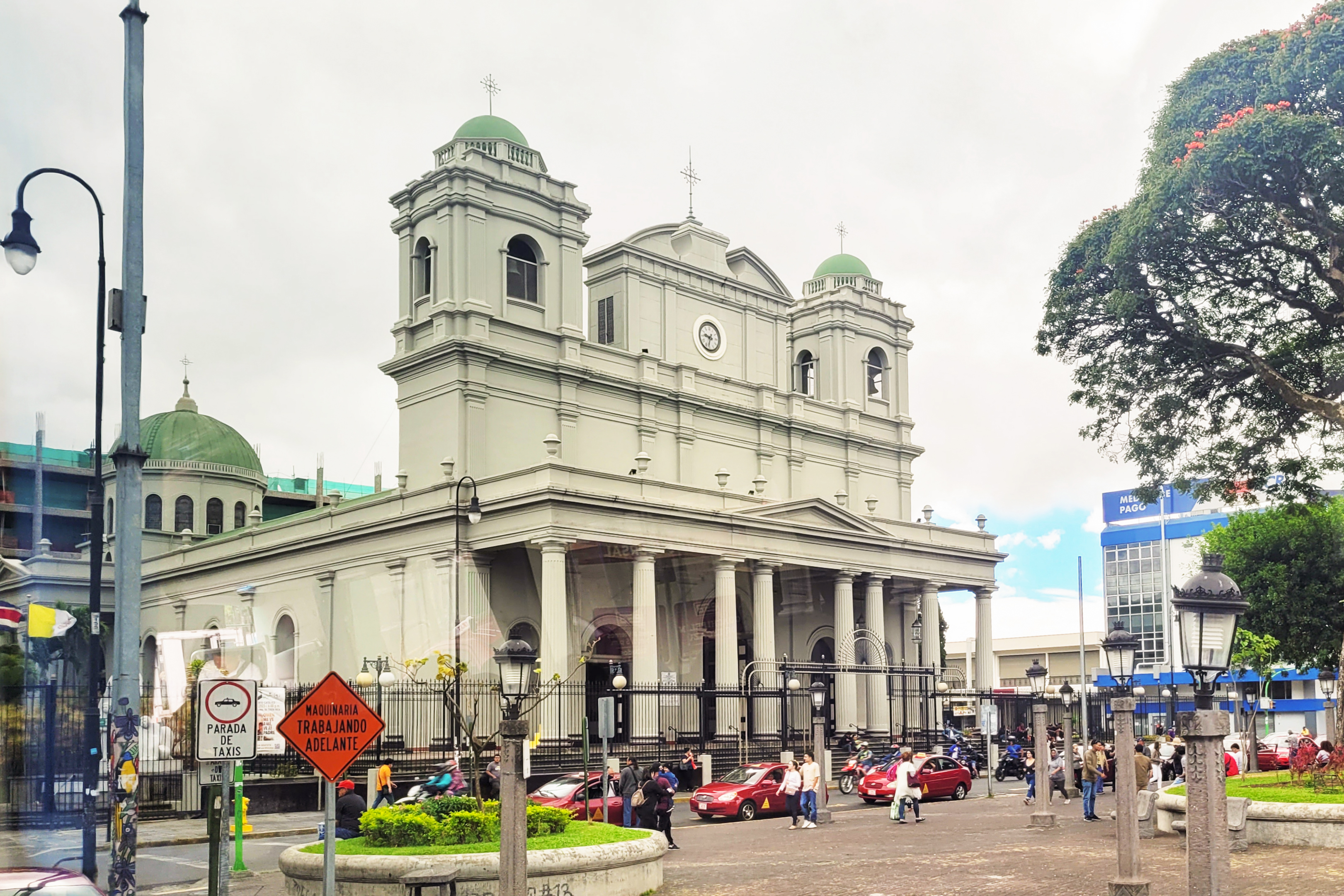
Façade

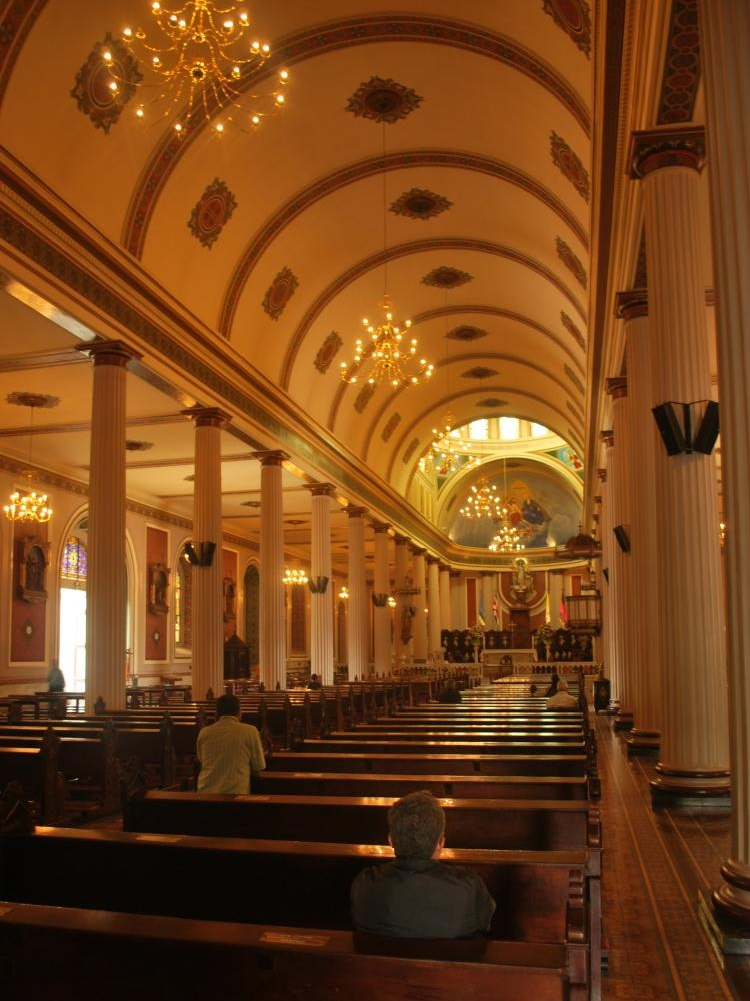
Interior

The Metropolitan Cathedral of San José (Spanish: Catedral Metropolitana) is a cathedral in San José, Costa Rica, located on Calle Central and Avenues 2 and 4. The original cathedral was built in 1802 but was destroyed by an earthquake.
