= Diocese of Puntarenas =

Latin Catholic ecclesiastical jurisdiction in Costa Rica

Coordinates: 9.9777°N 84.8349°W

Diocese of Puntarenas Dioecesis Puntarenensis Diócesis de Puntarenas
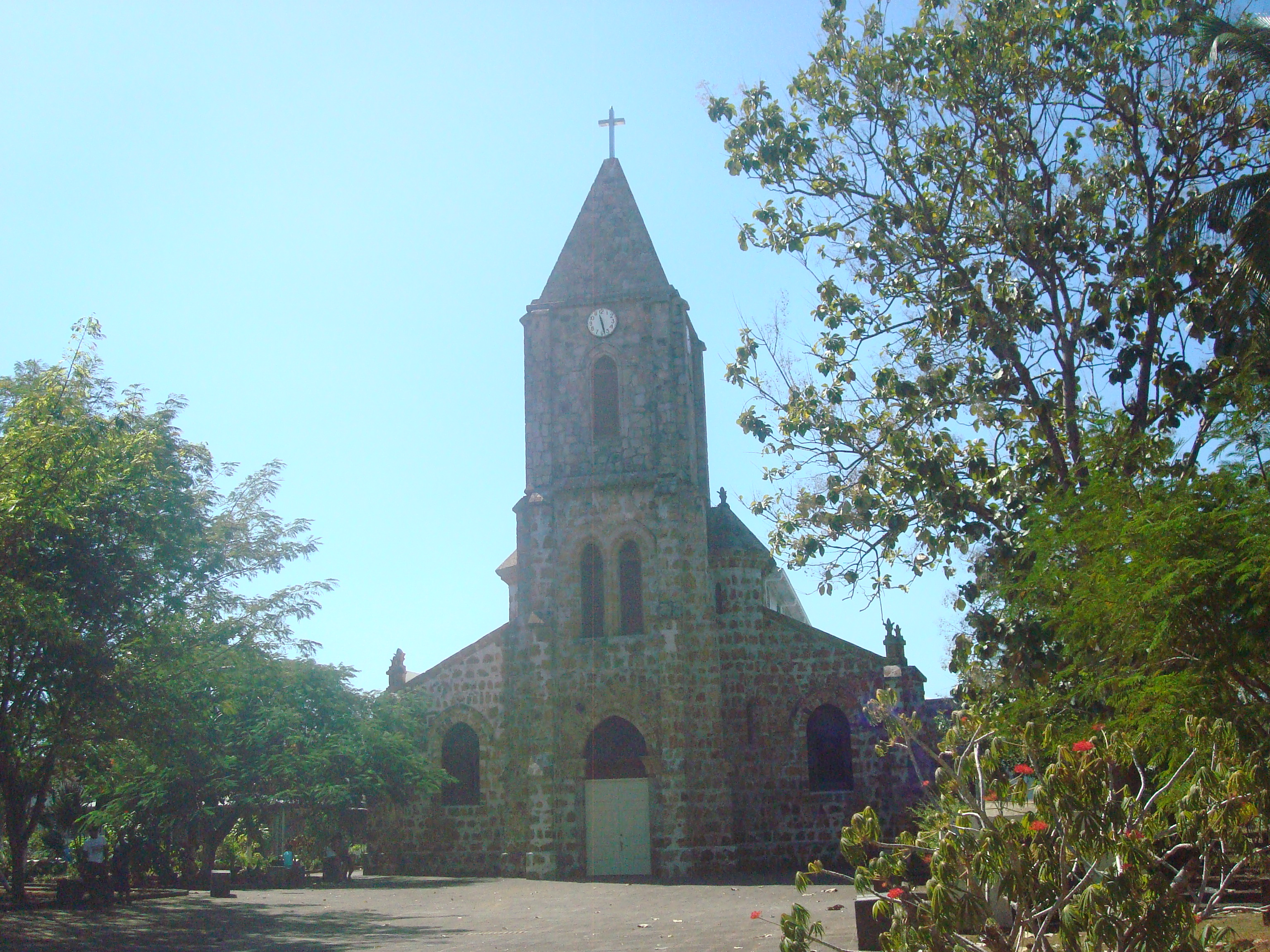
- Catedral Nuestra Señora del Carmen

Location
- Country: Costa Rica
- Ecclesiastical province: Province of San José de Costa Rica
- Metropolitan: Hugo Barrantes Ureña

Statistics
- Area: 3,930 km^{2} (1,520 sq mi)
- Population: Total; Catholics: (as of 2023); 228,530; 202,660 (88.7%)
- Parishes: 18

Information
- Denomination: Catholic Church
- Sui iuris church: Latin Church
- Rite: Roman Rite
- Established: 17 April 1998 (28 years ago)
- Cathedral: Cathedral of Our Lady of Mount Carmel

Current leadership
- Pope: Leo XIV
- Bishop: Elímar Gerardo Carvajal Durán
- Bishops emeritus: Óscar Fernández Guillén

Map
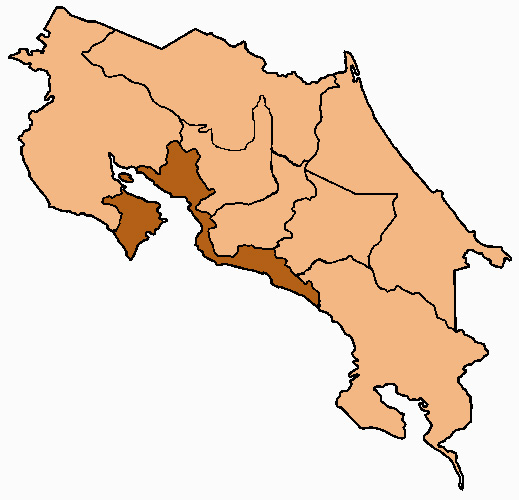

The Diocese of Puntarenas (Latin: Dioecesis Puntarenensis) is a Latin Church ecclesiastical territory or diocese of the Catholic Church in Costa Rica. It is a suffragan diocese in the ecclesiastical province of the metropolitan Archdiocese of San José de Costa Rica. It was erected as a diocese 17 April 1998.

== Ordinaries ==
- Hugo Barrantes Ureña (1998 – 2002), appointed Archbishop of San José de Costa Rica
- Óscar Fernández Guillén (2003 – 2026)
- Elímar Gerardo Carvajal Durán (2026 – present)

== External links and references ==
- Diócesis de Puntarenas Costa Rica official site (in Spanish)
- "Diocese of Puntarenas". Catholic-Hierarchy.
