= Hugo Barrantes Ureña =

Costa Rican Catholic archbishop (1936–2024)

His Excellency Hugo Barrantes Ureña
- Archbishop Emeritus of San José de Costa Rica
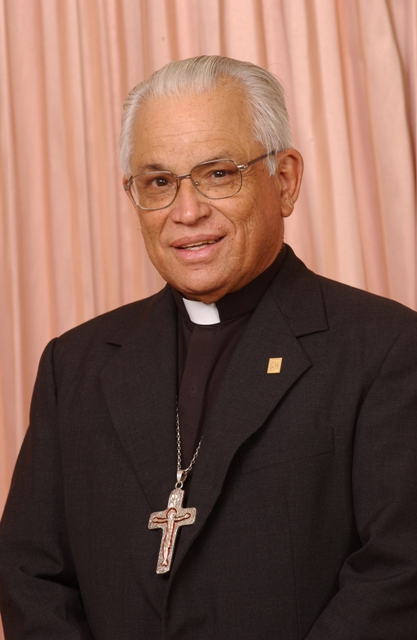
- Barrantes in 2004
- Archdiocese: San José de Costa Rica
- Appointed: 13 July 2002
- Term ended: 4 July 2013
- Predecessor: Román Arrieta Villalobos
- Successor: José Rafael Quirós Quirós
- Previous post: Bishop of Puntarenas (1998–2002)

Orders
- Ordination: 23 December 1961 by Delfín Quesada Castro
- Consecration: 16 July 1998 by Román Arrieta Villalobos

Personal details
- Born: Hugo Barrantes Ureña; 21 May 1936 San Isidro de El General, Costa Rica
- Died: 28 September 2024 (aged 88) San José, Costa Rica
- Education: Pontifical Gregorian University
- Motto: Duc in Altum (Lead to the Deep)
- Coat of arms

Styles of Hugo Barrantes Ureña
- Reference style: His Excellency; The Most Reverend
- Spoken style: Your Excellency
- Religious style: Archbishop

Hugo Barrantes Ureña (21 May 1936 – 28 September 2024) was a Costa Rican Roman Catholic prelate. He was bishop of Puntarenas from 1998 to 2002 and the archbishop of San José de Costa Rica from 2002 to 2013. Barrantes Ureña died on 28 September 2024, at the age of 88.

Catholic Church titles
Preceded by Román Arrieta Villalobos	Archbishop of San José de Costa Rica; 2002–2013	Succeeded by José Rafael Quirós Quirós
Preceded by First	Bishop of Puntarenas; 1998–2002	Succeeded by Óscar Fernández Guillén
