= Víctor Manuel Sanabria Martínez =

Archbishop of San José from 1940 to 1952

The Most Reverend Víctor Manuel Sanabria
- Archbishop of San José de Costa Rica
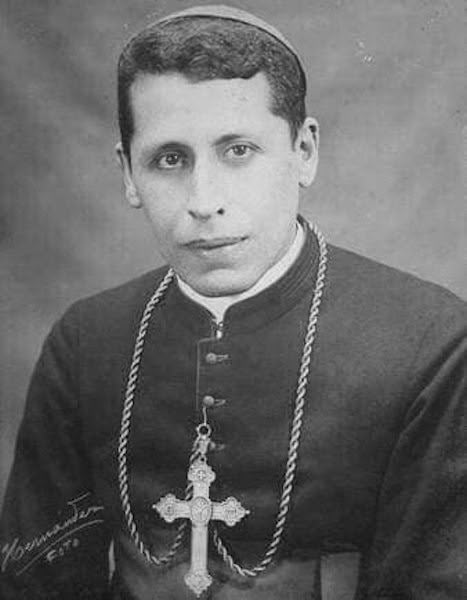
- Portrait, c. 1940
- Church: Catholic Church
- Archdiocese: Archdiocese of San José de Costa Rica
- Appointed: 7 March 1940
- Installed: 28 April 1940
- Term ended: 8 June 1952
- Predecessor: Rafael Otón Castro Jiménez
- Successor: Rubén Odio Herrera
- Previous posts: Bishop of Alajuela (1938‍–‍1940); Vicar General of San José (1935‍–‍1938)

Orders
- Ordination: 4 October 1921 by Filippo Cortesi
- Consecration: 25 April 1938 by Carlo Chiarlo

Personal details
- Born: Víctor Manuel Sanabria Martínez; 17 January 1899 San Rafael, Costa Rica
- Died: San José, Costa Rica 8 June 1952 (aged 53)
- Education: Pontifical Academy of Saint Thomas Aquinas; Pontifical Latin American College (JCD)
- Motto: Sperans in Domino sanabitur (Latin for 'He who hopes in the Lord shall be healed')
- Styles
- Reference style: His Excellency
- Spoken style: Your Excellency
- Religious style: Monsignor

Víctor Manuel Sanabria Martínez (17 January 1899 – 8 June 1952) was a Costa Rican Catholic prelate and historian who served as the second Archbishop of San José from 1940 until his death in 1952. He previously served as Bishop of Alajuela from 1938 to 1940 and as Vicar General of the Archdiocese of San José from 1935 to 1938.

Born in Oreamuno, Sanabria played an important role in Costa Rica's social reforms of the 1940s. He supported the enactment of the country's social legislation, including the constitutional chapter on Social Guarantees and the Labor Code, and was an advocate of closer cooperation between the Catholic Church, organized labor, and the government. In 1959, the Legislative Assembly declared him Benemérito de la Patria ("Meritorious Citizen of the Nation").

In addition to his ecclesiastical work, Sanabria was one of the leading historians of the Catholic Church in Costa Rica. His writings on local ecclesiastical history and genealogy remain important sources for the study of Costa Rican history. His influence on the country's social reforms and on the relationship between the Church and the state made him one of the most significant figures in twentieth-century Costa Rican public life.

== Early life, family, and education (1899–1922) ==
Víctor Manuel Sanabria Martínez was born into a farming family in San Rafael de Oreamuno, Cartago, on 17 January 1899, the youngest of seven children of Ramón Zenón de Jesús Sanabria Quirós (1866–1922) and Juana Francisca Martínez Brenes (1876–1924), both natives of Orosí, Paraíso.

Sanabria completed his primary education in Oreamuno and Cartago before moving to San José to attend the private Seminary College for his secondary studies. In 1912, he applied for admission to the old Major Seminary (known as the Tridentine Seminary), which had been led by since 1893 by the Paulist Fathers and was located behind the Metropolitan Cathedral of San José. He began his there studies in 1915 under Father Guillermo Hennicken, who served as his spiritual director, Father Juan Koch, and Father José Ohlemüller, professor of dogmatic theology.

On 15 March 1919, he petitioned to receive the major order of subdiaconate, which was granted. Because he had not yet reached the canonical age required for priestly ordination, Bishop Juan Gaspar Stork Werth appointed him as a professor at the Minor Seminary while he continued his formation.

Later that year, Stork sent Sanabria to Rome to pursue advanced ecclesiastical studies at the Pontifical Latin American College. On 13 June 1921, he received a Doctor of Canon Law (JCD) degree summa cum laude and also completed a course in philosophy at the Pontifical Academy of Saint Thomas Aquinas.

== Ecclesiastical career (1922–1940) ==
On 4 October 1921, Sanabria was ordained a priest by Bishop Filippo Cortesi in the chapel of the Pontifical Latin American College, where he celebrated his first Low Mass several days later.

After returning to Costa Rica in 1922, Sanabria was appointed assistant priest of the Parish of Cartago and teacher of religious education at San Luis Gonzaga School. In September 1923, he became parish priest of San Ignacio de Acosta, and in 1925 was transferred to Our Lady of Sion College as chaplain. He later taught at the Seminary College and served as secretary of the Metropolitan Curia, as well as Treasurer and Administrator General of Pious Funds. In 1924, he traveled with Archbishop Rafael Otón Castro Jiménez to Rome as his secretary.

Sanabria subsequently became a theological canon of the Metropolitan Chapter and held several administrative offices within the Archdiocese of San José, including Chancellor and Administrator of the Metropolitan Curia. In July 1935, Archbishop Castro appointed him Vicar General of the Archdiocese of San José.

On 12 March 1938, Pope Pius XI named Sanabria the second Bishop of Alajuela. He was consecrated on 25 April in a ceremony presided over by Apostolic Nuncio Carlo Chiarlo and Archbishop Rafael Otón Castro Jiménez. He took as his episcopal motto Sperans in Domino sanabitur (Latin for He who hopes in the Lord shall be healed'), from the Book of Proverbs.

== Archbishop of San José (1940–1952) ==
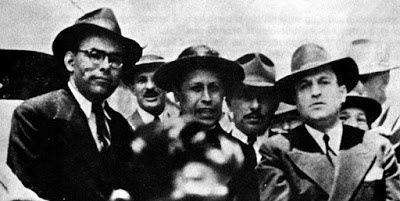
Manuel Mora (left), Sanabria (centre) and Rafael Ángel Calderón (right) in the 1940s.

Following the death of Archbishop Rafael Otón Castro Jiménez, Pope Pius XII appointed Sanabria the second Archbishop of San José on 7 March 1940. He was installed on 28 April and remained archbishop until his death in 1952. As head of the Catholic Church in Costa Rica during a period of profound political and social change, Sanabria became one of the country's most influential public figures. His tenure coincided with the administrations of Rafael Ángel Calderón Guardia, Teodoro Picado Michalski, the Founding Junta of the Second Republic led by José Figueres Ferrer, and the early presidency of Otilio Ulate Blanco.

As archbishop, Sanabria reorganized and expanded the archdiocese, overseeing the construction of a new Central Seminary at Paso Ancho (San Sebastián) between 1946 and 1950. The establishment of the Minor Seminary of Our Lady of the Angels was ordered through his decree of 4 February 1950; it began operations on 19 March of that year in San Cristóbal, Desamparados, and was transferred to Tres Ríos, La Unión, in 1954, where it remained until its closure in 1978. He also promoted Catholic Action (ACCR), expanded charitable works, and defended Catholic education. He founded Radio Fides in 1950, which began broadcasting in 1952.

Sanabria played a central role in Costa Rica's social reforms of the 1940s. Drawing on Catholic social teaching, he mediated between President Rafael Ángel Calderón Guardia and the communist leader Manuel Mora Valverde, helping facilitate the political agreement that enabled the enactment of the Social Guarantees, the Labour Code, and the creation of the University of Costa Rica and the Costa Rican Social Security Fund. As part of the agreement, Sanabria secured the reintroduction of religious education in primary schools, decreed on 8 November 1940, and the repeal of the anticlerical legislation of 1884 on 30 July 1942.

Although Sanabria remained critical of communist doctrine, he supported cooperation between the Catholic Church, the Calderón administration, and the communist movement in pursuit of social reform. He argued that Catholic social teaching provided an alternative to both liberal individualism and Marxism, while maintaining that collaboration on specific social objectives was compatible with Christian principles. His position was influenced by his support for Calderón's reform program and by the communists' growing emphasis on participation through constitutional and electoral means. Sanabria also encouraged the People's Vanguard Party to moderate its public image and distance itself from explicit identification with international communism. His stance generated debate within the Costa Rican clergy, many of whom continued to oppose any form of cooperation with communist organizations.

In a pastoral letter addressed to the clergy of San José on 12 December 1945, Sanabria reflected on earlier efforts to combat communism in Costa Rica. He argued that political repression alone could not eliminate the movement and maintained that social injustice constituted one of the principal causes of its appeal. Citing the teachings of Pope Pius XI, he contended that the most effective response to communism was the implementation of social reforms addressing the economic and social conditions that fostered support for it.

During and after the 1948 Costa Rican Civil War, Sanabria sought to promote reconciliation between the opposing factions. Following the victory of the Founding Junta of the Second Republic, he intervened on behalf of political prisoners and members of the defeated communist and Calderonista movements during the postwar period.

== Written works ==
In addition to his pastoral ministry, Sanabria developed a distinguished career as a historian, educator, and scholar. He taught at the Seminary College, the Minor Seminary, the Major Seminary, and San Luis Gonzaga School. At the Major Seminary, he held the chair of Spanish language and literature. His scholarly work focused primarily on the history of the Catholic Church in Costa Rica and Central America. In 1937, he was elected to occupy Chair A of the Costa Rican Academy of Language, which had been vacated upon the death of Cleto González Víquez. However, Sanabria never took the seat, and it remained without an occupant until 1953. He was a corresponding member of the Venezuelan Academy of History, and other learned societies. In July 1940, he was among the founding members of the Costa Rican Academy of Geography and History.

From the beginning of his ecclesiastical career, Sanabria devoted considerable attention to the organization and study of the Archdiocesan Library and Archives, continuing work previously undertaken by Bishop Bernhard August Thiel. His examination of archival records and other primary sources formed the basis of much of his historical scholarship. Church historians have described him as Thiel's successor in the development of Costa Rican ecclesiastical historiography. Beginning in 1927, he continued publishing Thiel's Datos cronológicos para la historia eclesiástica de Costa Rica in the journals Cultura Católica and Mensajero del Clero.

From 1929 onward, Sanabria published studies on a wide range of subjects, including Our Lady of the Angels, the National Campaign of 1856–1857, the Franciscan Order in Costa Rica, and the bishops of Nicaragua and Costa Rica, culminating in his Episcopologio de Nicaragua y Costa Rica, 1531–1850 (1943). His best-known works include a trilogy on the history of the Diocese of San José, covering the period from its establishment in 1850 to the death of Bishop Thiel in 1901: Anselmo Llorente y Lafuente, Primer Obispo de Costa Rica (1933), Primera Vacante de la Diócesis de San José (1935), and Bernardo Augusto Thiel, Segundo Obispo de Costa Rica (1941). He also published Documenta Historica Beatae Mariae Virginis Angelorum (1945), a documentary study of the history and development of devotion to Our Lady of the Angels, Costa Rica's patron saint. His Reseña histórica de la Iglesia en Costa Rica desde 1502 hasta 1850 was published posthumously in 1984 and later reissued in a critical edition in 2014.

Sanabria also conducted extensive genealogical research, only part of which was published. His six-volume Genealogías de Cartago hasta 1850, based largely on baptismal and parish registers, was published posthumously in 1957 and republished in 2006. He also compiled Genealogías de San José y Heredia hasta 1821, which remained unfinished and unpublished but is preserved in the Historical Archive of the Archdiocese of San José. In addition to his native Spanish, he had a command of Latin, Greek, and Italian acquired through his ecclesiastical studies, and later taught himself German, English, and French.

His other published works include Los orígenes de la Masonería en Costa Rica (1928), Últimos años de la Orden Franciscana en Costa Rica (1931), Los muertos de la Campaña Nacional de 1856–1857 (1932), Datos cronológicos para la historia eclesiástica de Costa Rica (1935), and Episcopologio de Nicaragua y Costa Rica, 1531–1850 (1943), in addition to numerous articles published in the journals "Cultura Católica", "Mensajero del Clero" and "Revista de Costa Rica".

== Death and legacy ==
Sanabria died suddenly of a heart attack in San José on 8 June 1952 at the age of 53, while serving as Archbishop of San José.

Through Agreement N.° 309 adopted in session of 19 November 1959, the Legislative Assembly of Costa Rica declared Sanabria Benemérito de la Patria in recognition of his contributions to the country's religious, educational, and social development. The resolution also requested the Executive Branch to arrange for the publication of his collected works.

A primary school in Alajuela, another in San Rafael de Oreamuno, a vocational school in Desamparados, and the public hospital in Puntarenas were named after him.

In June 1978, on the twenty-sixth anniversary of his death, President Rodrigo Carazo Odio visited the chapel in San Rafael de Oreamuno where Sanabria is buried, where he stated that "with a trilogy of social justice, apostolic action, and historical research, Monsignor Sanabria achieved the goals of social advancement for the institutions of the Republic". Following concerns raised by local residents regarding the condition of the structure, restoration efforts were subsequently undertaken. In 2022, on the seventieth anniversary of his death, the Municipality of Oreamuno announced a new restoration project for the chapel, which was completed the following year.

In February 2017, the Catholic hierarchy of Costa Rica submitted documentation to the Vatican's Congregation for the Causes of Saints to initiate the process for his beatification.

Catholic Church titles
Preceded by Antonio Monestel Zamora	Bishop of Alajuela; 12 March 1938 – 7 March 1940	Succeeded by Juan Vicente Solís Fernández
Preceded by Rafael Otón Castro Jiménez	Archbishop of San José de Costa Rica; 7 March 1940 – 8 June 1952	Succeeded by Rubén Odio Herrera
