= Rubén Odio Herrera =

Archbishop of San José from 1952 to 1959

The Most Reverend Rubén Odio Herrera
- Archbishop of San José de Costa Rica
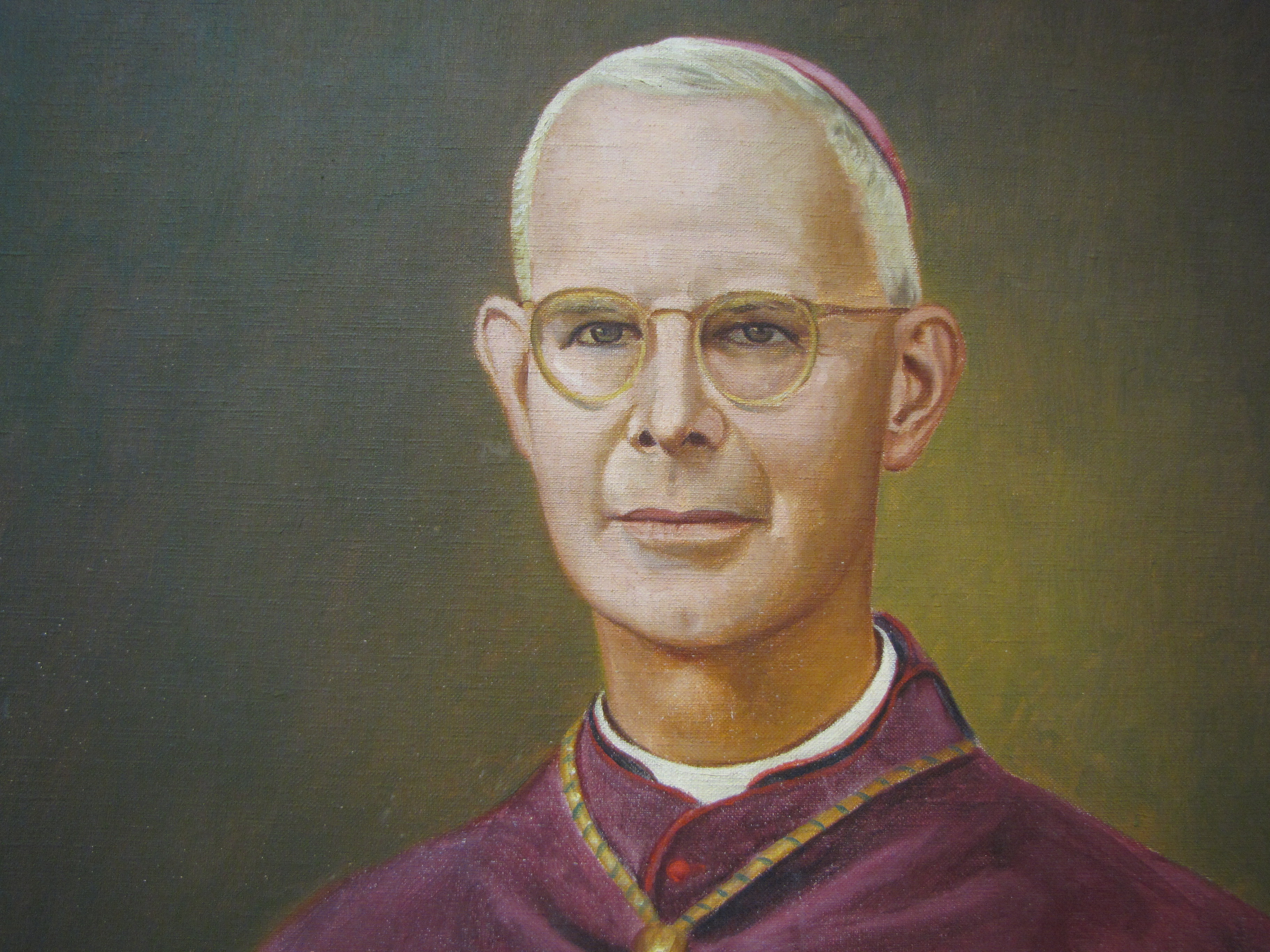
- Church: Catholic Church
- Archdiocese: Archdiocese of San José de Costa Rica
- Appointed: 31 October 1952
- Term ended: 21 August 1959
- Predecessor: Víctor Manuel Sanabria Martínez
- Successor: Carlos Humberto Rodríguez Quirós
- Previous posts: Titular Bishop of Sebela (1951‍–‍1952); Auxiliary Bishop of San José (1951‍–‍1952)

Orders
- Ordination: 29 June 1924 by Rafael Otón Castro Jiménez
- Consecration: 12 December 1951 by Víctor Manuel Sanabria Martínez

Personal details
- Born: Rubén Rafael del Rosario Odio Herrera; 22 October 1901 San José, Costa Rica
- Died: San José, Costa Rica 21 August 1959 (aged 57)
- Motto: Nova et vetera (Latin for 'New and old')
- Styles
- Reference style: His Excellency
- Spoken style: Your Excellency
- Religious style: Monsignor

Rubén Rafael del Rosario Odio Herrera (22 October 1901 – 21 August 1959) was a Costa Rican Catholic prelate who served as the third Archbishop of San José from 1952 until his death in 1959. He previously served as Auxiliary Bishop of San José from 1951 to 1952 and as rector of the Minor Seminary of Our Lady of the Angels from 1950 to 1951, after nearly three decades in parish ministry.

Ordained a priest in 1924, Odio served in several parishes, including Ciudad Colón, Pacayas, Desamparados, and Cartago, before entering the episcopate. Following the death of Archbishop Víctor Manuel Sanabria Martínez, he was appointed to lead the Archdiocese of San José, becoming the principal figure of the Catholic Church in Costa Rica during the 1950s.

As archbishop, he promoted priestly vocations, Catholic education, and pastoral formation, while continuing many of the ecclesiastical initiatives established under his predecessor. He also served as president of the Central American Assembly of Bishops and presided over the Second National Eucharistic Congress in 1955.

== Early life and ecclesiastical career (1901–1952) ==
Rubén Rafael del Rosario Odio Herrera was born in San José on 22 October 1901, one of twenty children of Alberto Odio Giró (1865–1948) and Julia Leocadia Adelia Herrera Paut (1874–1944). He completed his secondary education at the private Seminary College in San José, where he was a classmate of the future Archbishop Víctor Manuel Sanabria Martínez, and subsequently entered the old Major Seminary. He was ordained a priest by Archbishop Rafael Otón Castro Jiménez on 29 June 1924.

Following his ordination, Odio was appointed assistant priest of the Parish of Our Lady of Mercy (La Merced) in San José. In 1925, while parish priest Rosendo de Jesús Valenciano traveled to Rome for the Holy Year celebrations, Odio temporarily administered the parish. He subsequently served as parish priest of Ciudad Colón (1926–1932), Pacayas (1932–1935), Desamparados (1935–1944), and Cartago (1944–1950).

In 1949, he was appointed honorary canon of the Metropolitan Chapter. The following year, Archbishop Sanabria named him rector of the Minor Seminary of Our Lady of the Angels, which had recently been established as part of the archdiocese's efforts to promote priestly vocations.

On 30 October 1951, Pope Pius XII appointed him titular bishop of Sebela and auxiliary bishop of San José. He was also named a Domestic Prelate of His Holiness. He received episcopal consecration on 12 December 1951.

== Archbishop of San José (1952–1959) ==
Following the death of Archbishop Víctor Manuel Sanabria Martínez in June 1952, Pope Pius XII appointed Odio as the third Archbishop of San José on 31 October 1952. He took possession of the archdiocese later that year and remained in office until his death in 1959.

As archbishop, Odio emphasized the promotion of priestly vocations, Catholic education, and pastoral formation. He continued several initiatives begun under his predecessor, particularly those related to the Minor Seminary and the strengthening of parish life throughout the archdiocese.

He issued two pastoral letters during his episcopate, including one on the occasion of his installation and another in 1954 addressing the growth of Protestant denominations in Costa Rica. Together with the other bishops of the Ecclesiastical Province of Costa Rica, he also co-authored several pastoral letters and doctrinal statements.

Odio served as president of the Central American Assembly of Bishops and participated in a number of ecclesiastical meetings and initiatives at the regional and Ibero-American levels. In 1955, he presided over the Second National Eucharistic Congress held in Costa Rica.

== Death and legacy ==
Odio died in San José on 21 August 1959 following a heart attack. He was 57 years old and had served as Archbishop of San José for nearly seven years. He maintained a close admiration for Archbishop Sanabria and supported the continuation of many of the social and pastoral priorities associated with his predecessor's administration.

The public Liceo Monseñor Rubén Odio Herrera in Desamparados was named in his honor. His episcopate is generally remembered as a period of institutional consolidation for the Archdiocese of San José following the transformative tenure of Archbishop Sanabria.
