= Juan Gaspar Stork Werth =

Bishop of Costa Rica from 1904 to 1920

The Most Reverend Juan Gaspar Stork CM
- Bishop of Costa Rica
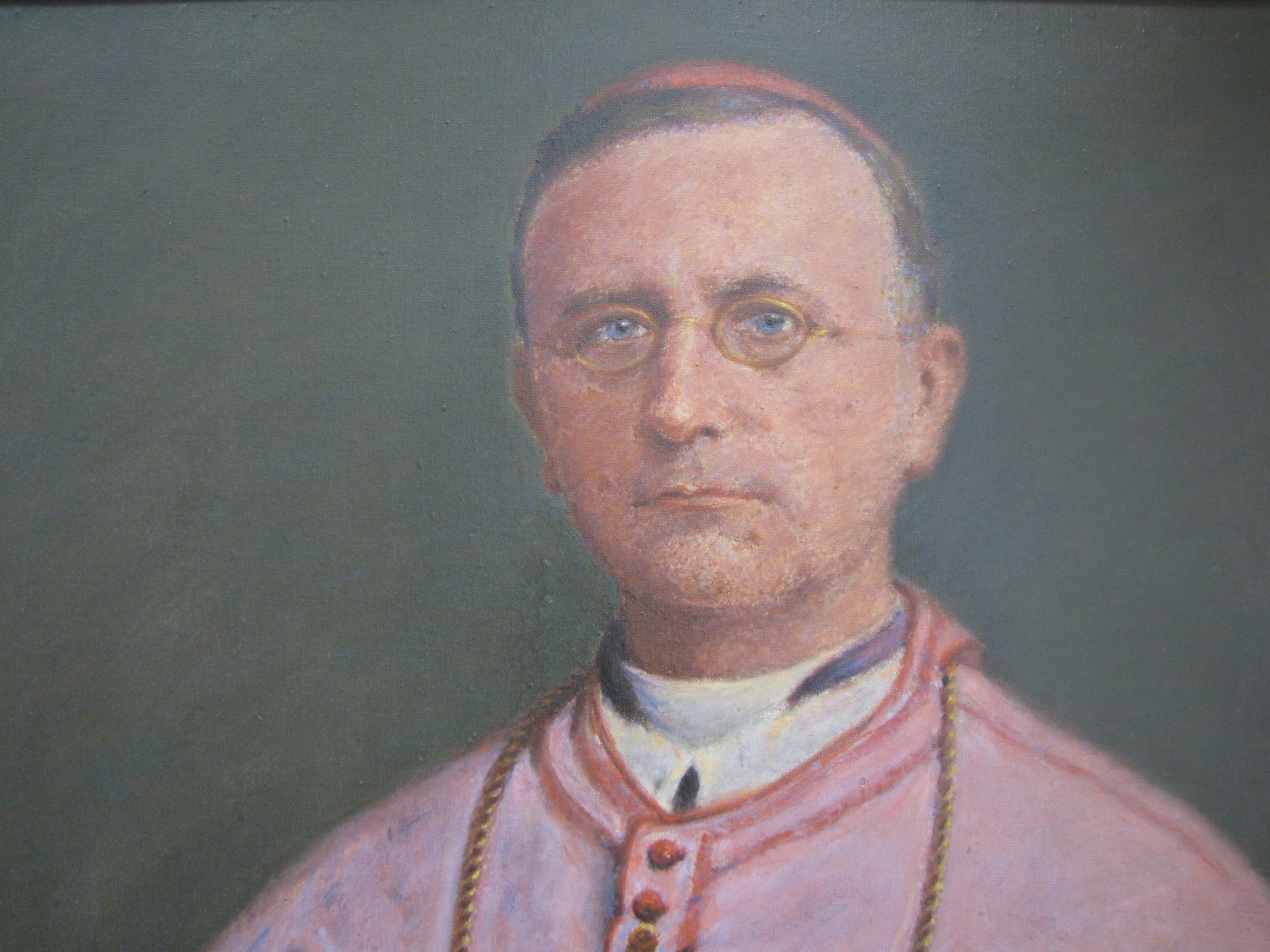
- Church: Catholic Church
- Diocese: Costa Rica
- Appointed: 11 June 1904
- Installed: 28 August 1904
- Term ended: 12 December 1920
- Predecessor: Bernhard August Thiel
- Successor: Rafael Otón Castro Jiménez (as Archbishop)

Orders
- Ordination: 7 June 1879
- Consecration: 28 August 1904

Personal details
- Born: Joaennes Caspar Stork; 5 June 1856 Cologne, Kingdom of Prussia
- Died: 12 December 1920 (aged 64) Cologne, Free State of Prussia
- Education: Pontifical University of Saint Thomas Aquinas (PhD)
- Motto: Fide et Pace (Latin for 'Faith and peace')
- Styles
- Reference style: His Excellency
- Spoken style: Your Excellency
- Religious style: Monsignor

Juan Gaspar Stork Werth (born Joaennes Caspar Stork; 5 June 1856 – 12 December 1920) was a German-born Catholic prelate and academic who served as the third and last Bishop of Costa Rica from 1904 until his death in 1920. Before his appointment to the episcopate, he was a member of the Congregation of the Mission, a professor and seminary rector in Europe, and rector of the Major Seminary of Costa Rica from 1893 to 1904.

During his sixteen-year episcopate, Stork presided over the Second Diocesan Synod of Costa Rica, organized the First National Eucharistic Congress, promoted the expansion of parishes and church construction, and strengthened priestly formation through the Major Seminary. He was also the last bishop to govern the Catholic Church throughout the entire territory of Costa Rica before the establishment of the Ecclesiastical Province of Costa Rica in 1921.

== Early life and ecclesiastical career (1856–1904) ==
Joaennes Caspar Stork was born on 5 June 1856 in Cologne, Prussia (present-day Germany), the son of Friedrich Wilhelm Stork and Albertina Werth. After completing his primary education, he attended the Cologne Gymnasium (Köllnisches Gymnasium), where he studied the humanities. At the age of eighteen, he entered the Congregation of the Mission in Paris and was ordained a priest on 7 June 1879.

Stork pursued advanced ecclesiastical studies in France, earning doctorates in theology, philosophy, and law. He taught philosophy at institutions of the Lazarist Congregation in Paris and theology in Soissons. Between 1886 and 1893, he served as rector and professor of theology at the seminary of Theux, Belgium.

On 29 June 1893, Stork arrived in Costa Rica with a group of German Vincentian priests who had been invited to assume responsibility for priestly formation in the country. He was immediately appointed rector of the old Major Seminary in San José, a position he held for more than a decade. During his tenure, he became closely involved in the formation of a generation of Costa Rican clergy, including several future bishops and archbishops.

On 11 June 1904, Pope Pius X appointed Stork the third Bishop of San José. He received episcopal consecration and took possession of the diocese on 28 August 1904 at the Cathedral of San José, succeeding Bishop Bernhard August Thiel.

== Bishop of Costa (1904–1920) ==
As bishop, Stork governed the Diocese of San José, which at the time encompassed the entire territory of Costa Rica. His episcopate was marked by efforts to strengthen ecclesiastical institutions, expand parish structures, and promote Catholic devotional life throughout the country.

Stork placed particular emphasis on priestly formation. He expanded the facilities of the Major Seminary and oversaw the construction of its chapel. He also encouraged preaching, sacramental life, and charitable works, particularly those carried out by the Society of Saint Vincent de Paul.

Between 24 and 29 January 1910, he convoked and presided over the Second Diocesan Synod of Costa Rica, which established important pastoral and administrative regulations for the local Church and contributed to the creation of several new parishes. In 1913, he organized the First National Eucharistic Congress, one of the most significant religious events held in Costa Rica during the early twentieth century.

Stork promoted devotion to the Sacred Heart of Jesus and the Virgin Mary and supported numerous church-building projects. During his episcopate, construction began on the present Basilica of Our Lady of the Angels in Cartago, while major improvements were carried out at the Cathedral of San José, including the installation of stained-glass windows in 1914 and the acquisition of liturgical furnishings and precious metalwork. He also encouraged the construction of new parish churches in Cartago, Moravia, Atenas, San Rafael de Oreamuno, Curridabat, Desamparados, and San Isidro de Heredia. In 1917, Stork excommunicated all members of the Theosophical Society.

In his relations with the civil authorities, Stork generally adopted a cautious and conciliatory approach. He maintained cordial relations with successive governments while focusing the Church's efforts on pastoral, educational, and charitable activities. During his episcopate, the hierarchy of the Costa Rican Catholic Church also supported and endorsed health regulations decreed by the State.

Stork made two ad limina visits to Rome, in 1905 and 1920. During his episcopate, Costa Rica received its first permanent representatives of the Holy See, including Apostolic Delegate Juan Cagliero and later Internuncio Juan Bautista Marenco. Stork supported the establishment of a permanent diplomatic presence of the Holy See in the country and promoted the construction of a suitable residence for its representatives.

He authored fourteen pastoral letters and approximately thirty doctrinal circulars addressing matters of faith, discipline, and pastoral practice. His leadership helped prepare the Costa Rican Church for its future elevation to metropolitan status.

== Death and legacy ==
Stork died in Cologne, Germany, on 12 December 1920 while returning from his second ad limina visit. He was 64 years old and had served as bishop for sixteen years. His remains were later repatriated to Costa Rica and interred in the Metropolitan Cathedral of San José.

He was the last bishop to govern the whole of Costa Rica. On 16 February 1921, two months after his death, Pope Benedict XV established the Ecclesiastical Province of Costa Rica, elevating the Diocese of San José to an archdiocese and creating the Diocese of Alajuela and the Apostolic Vicariate of Limón. As a result, Stork became the final Bishop of Costa Rica before the reorganization of the country's Catholic hierarchy.
