= Rafael Otón Castro Jiménez =

Archbishop of San José from 1921 to 1939

The Most Reverend Rafael Otón Castro
- Archbishop of San José de Costa Rica
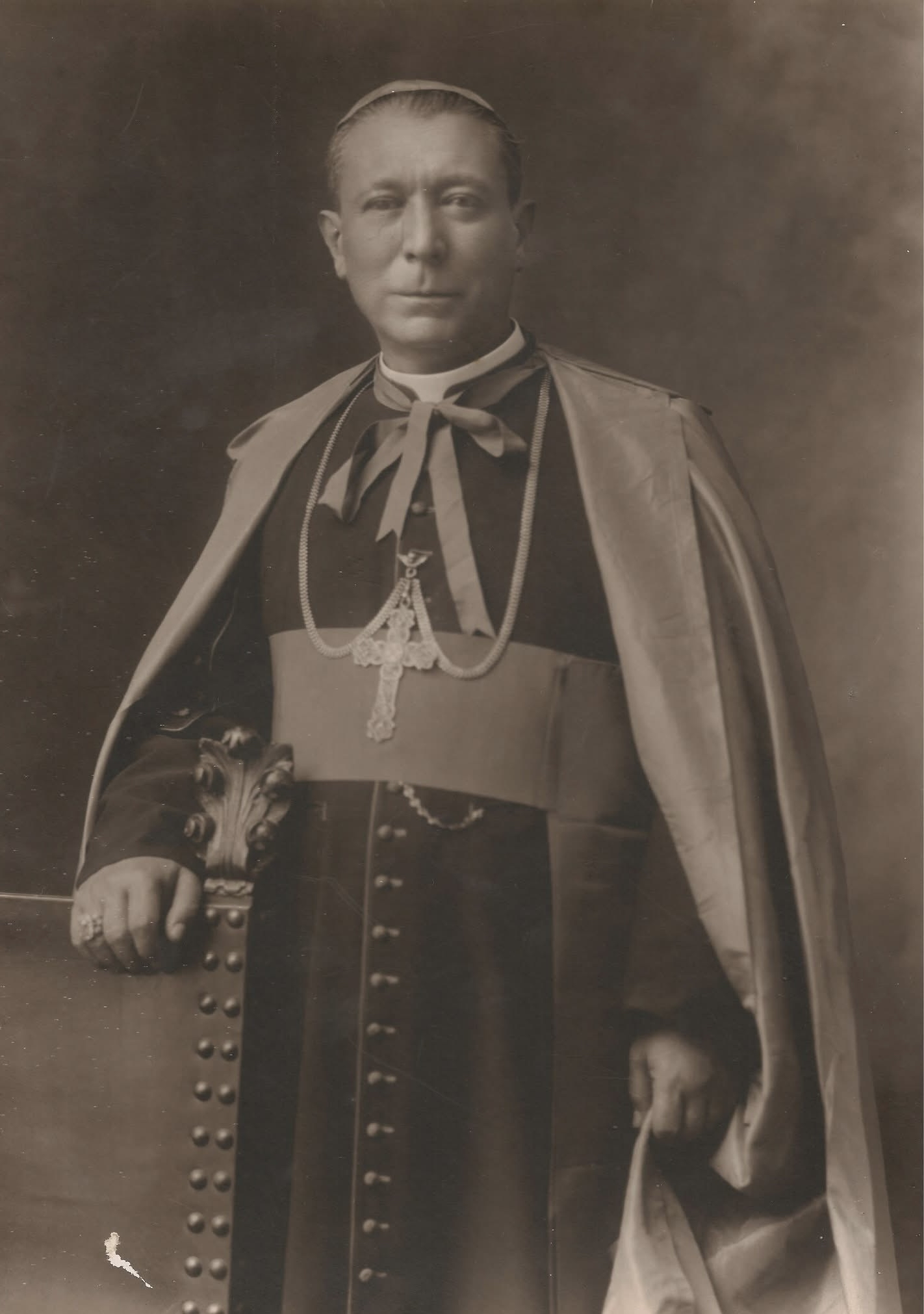
- Portrait, c. 1930
- Church: Catholic Church
- Archdiocese: Archdiocese of San José de Costa Rica
- Appointed: 10 March 1921
- Installed: 2 August 1921
- Term ended: 14 December 1939
- Predecessor: Juan Gaspar Stork Werth (as Bishop)
- Successor: Víctor Manuel Sanabria Martínez
- Previous post: Vicar Capitular of San José (1903‍–‍1904)

Orders
- Ordination: 28 October 1899
- Consecration: 10 March 1921 by Juan Bautista Marenco

Personal details
- Born: Rafael Otón Castro Jiménez; 16 January 1877 San José, Costa Rica
- Died: San José, Costa Rica 14 December 1939 (aged 62)
- Education: Pontifical Gregorian University (PhD, JCD)
- Motto: Omnia possum in eo qui me confortat (Latin for 'I can do all things through Him who strengthens me')
- Styles
- Reference style: His Excellency
- Spoken style: Your Excellency
- Religious style: Monsignor

Rafael Otón Castro Jiménez (16 January 1877 – 14 December 1939) was a Costa Rican Catholic prelate who served as the first Archbishop of San José from 1921 until his death in 1939. He previously served as parish priest of Cartago, Vicar Capitular of the Diocese of San José, and Canon Theologian of the cathedral chapter.

Educated in Rome at the Pontifical Latin American College and the Pontifical Gregorian University, Castro earned doctorates in philosophy, theology, and canon law before returning to Costa Rica in 1901. Following the creation of the Ecclesiastical Province of Costa Rica in 1921, he was appointed the country's first metropolitan archbishop.

During his episcopate, Castro presided over the Third Diocesan Synod, promoted devotion to Our Lady of the Angels, and oversaw several institutional and architectural developments within the Archdiocese of San José.

== Early life and ecclesiastical career (1877–1921) ==
Rafael Otón Castro Jiménez was born in San José on 16 January 1877, one of eleven children of Procopio Castro Rodríguez and María Jacinta Jiménez Castro.

At the age of twelve, he was sent to Rome by Bishop Bernhard August Thiel to continue his education at the Pontifical Latin American College. He completed studies in the humanities before attending the Pontifical Gregorian University, where he earned doctorates in philosophy, theology, and canon law. He was ordained a priest on 28 October 1899.

Castro returned to Costa Rica in 1901 and was appointed assistant priest of the Parish of Our Lady of Mercy (La Merced) in San José. In 1902, he became parish priest of San Juan de Tibás. Following the death of Bishop Thiel, he served as Vicar Capitular of the Diocese of San José between 1903 and 1904.

In late 1904, Castro was appointed parish priest of Cartago, a position he held until 3 October 1911. He subsequently served as Canon Theologian of the cathedral chapter and chaplain of Our Lady of Sion College. He was also editor of Mensajero del Clero and for a brief period served as Vicar General to Bishop José Piñol y Batres of Granada, in Nicaragua.

== Archbishop of San José (1921–1939) ==
On 16 February 1921, Pope Benedict XV established the Ecclesiastical Province of Costa Rica through the bull Praedecessorum Nostrorum. The Diocese of San José was elevated to the rank of metropolitan archdiocese, while the Diocese of Alajuela and the Apostolic Vicariate of Limón were created as new ecclesiastical jurisdictions.

On 10 March 1921, Castro was appointed the first Archbishop of San José. He received episcopal consecration from Apostolic Internuncio Juan Bautista Marenco on 2 August 1921 and took possession of the archdiocese the same day.

During his episcopate, Castro promoted devotion to Our Lady of the Angels, presiding over the canonical coronation of the image in 1926 and the celebrations marking the tricentennial of its discovery in 1935. He convened the Third Diocesan Synod of San José in 1924 and issued numerous pastoral letters and doctrinal instructions. He also oversaw the beautification of the Metropolitan Cathedral of San José and the construction of the present Archbishop's Palace.

Castro died in San José on 14 December 1939 after more than eighteen years as archbishop. His death led to the appointment of Víctor Manuel Sanabria Martínez as his successor in 1940.
