= Santa Rosa District, Oreamuno =

District in Oreamuno canton, Cartago province, Costa Rica

Santa Rosa
- District
- Santa Rosa district
- Santa Rosa district location in Costa Rica
- Coordinates: 10.0258311°N 83.8769838°W
- Country: Costa Rica
- Province: Cartago
- Canton: Oreamuno
- Creation: 4 January 1938

Area
  - Total: 149.81 km^{2} (57.84 sq mi)
- Elevation: 2,145 m (7,037 ft)

Population (2011)
  - Total: 2,614
  - Density: 17.45/km^{2} (45.19/sq mi)
- Time zone: UTC−06:00
- Postal code: 30705

Santa Rosa is a district of the Oreamuno canton, in the Cartago province of Costa Rica.

== History ==
Santa Rosa was created on 4 January 1938 by Acuerdo 1. Segregated from Cipreses.

== Geography ==
Santa Rosa has an area of 149.81 km^{2} (57.84 sq mi) and an elevation of 2,145 metres.

== Demographics ==
Historical population
| Census | Pop. | ±% p.a. |
|---|---|---|
| 1950 | 584 | — |
| 1963 | 1,105 | +5.03% |
| 1973 | 1,455 | +2.79% |
| 1984 | 2,019 | +3.02% |
| 2000 | 2,602 | +1.60% |
| 2011 | 2,614 | +0.04% |
| 2022 | 3,059 | +1.44% |
Source: Instituto Nacional de Estadística y Censos; Centro Centroamericano de Población

For the 2011 census, Santa Rosa had a population of 2,614 inhabitants.

== Transportation ==
=== Road transportation ===
The district is covered by the following road routes:

- National Route 219
- National Route 402
