= National Route 403 (Costa Rica) =

National Road Route in Costa Rica

National Tertiary Route 403
- Ruta nacional terciaria 403

Route information
- Maintained by Ministry of Public Works and Transport
- Length: 3.370 km (2.094 mi)

Location
- Country: Costa Rica
- Provinces: Cartago

Highway system
- National Road Network of Costa Rica
| ← Route 402 | → Route 404 |

National Tertiary Route 403, or just Route 403 (Spanish: Ruta Nacional Terciaria 403, or Ruta 403) is a National Road Route of Costa Rica, located in the Cartago province.

== Description ==
In Cartago province the route covers Alvarado canton (Cervantes district).
