= Potrero Cerrado =

District in Oreamuno canton, Cartago province, Costa Rica

- District
- Potrero Cerrado district
- Potrero Cerrado district location in Costa Rica
- Coordinates: 9.9315916°N 83.8751389°W
- Country: Costa Rica
- Province: Cartago
- Canton: Oreamuno

Area
  - Total: 18.2 km^{2} (7.0 sq mi)
- Elevation: 2,196 m (7,205 ft)

Population (2011)
  - Total: 2,281
  - Density: 125/km^{2} (325/sq mi)
- Time zone: UTC−06:00
- Postal code: 30703

Potrero Cerrado is a district of the Oreamuno canton, in the Cartago province of Costa Rica.

== Geography ==
Potrero Cerrado has an area of 18.2 km^{2} (7.0 sq mi) and an elevation of 2,196 metres.

== Climate ==
Potrero Cerrado has a subtropical highland climate (Cfb) with moderate rainfall from January to April and heavy rainfall from May to December.

Climate data for Potrero Cerrado
Month	Jan	Feb	Mar	Apr	May	Jun	Jul	Aug	Sep	Oct	Nov	Dec	Year
Mean daily maximum °C (°F)	16.8 (62.2)	17.6 (63.7)	18.4 (65.1)	18.6 (65.5)	18.5 (65.3)	18.0 (64.4)	17.8 (64.0)	17.9 (64.2)	18.1 (64.6)	17.7 (63.9)	17.2 (63.0)	16.8 (62.2)	17.8 (64.0)
Daily mean °C (°F)	12.9 (55.2)	13.2 (55.8)	13.8 (56.8)	14.3 (57.7)	14.6 (58.3)	14.4 (57.9)	14.4 (57.9)	14.4 (57.9)	14.3 (57.7)	13.9 (57.0)	13.7 (56.7)	13.1 (55.6)	13.9 (57.0)
Mean daily minimum °C (°F)	9.1 (48.4)	8.9 (48.0)	9.2 (48.6)	10.0 (50.0)	10.7 (51.3)	10.8 (51.4)	11.0 (51.8)	11.0 (51.8)	10.6 (51.1)	10.1 (50.2)	10.3 (50.5)	9.5 (49.1)	10.1 (50.2)
Average rainfall mm (inches)	79 (3.1)	42 (1.7)	33 (1.3)	75 (3.0)	217 (8.5)	238 (9.4)	197 (7.8)	231 (9.1)	270 (10.6)	314 (12.4)	201 (7.9)	135 (5.3)	2,032 (80.1)
Source: Climate-Data.org

== Demographics ==
Historical population
Census	Pop.	±% p.a.
1927	443	—
1950	945	+3.35%
1963	888	−0.48%
1973	888	+0.00%
1984	959	+0.70%
2000	2,023	+4.78%
2011	2,281	+1.10%
2022	2,402	+0.47%
Source: Instituto Nacional de Estadística y Censos; Centro Centroamericano de Población

For the 2011 census, Potrero Cerrado had a population of 2,281 inhabitants.

== Transportation ==
=== Road transportation ===
The district is covered by the following road routes:

- National Route 219
- National Route 401
