= Alvarado (canton) =

Canton in Cartago province, Costa Rica

- Canton
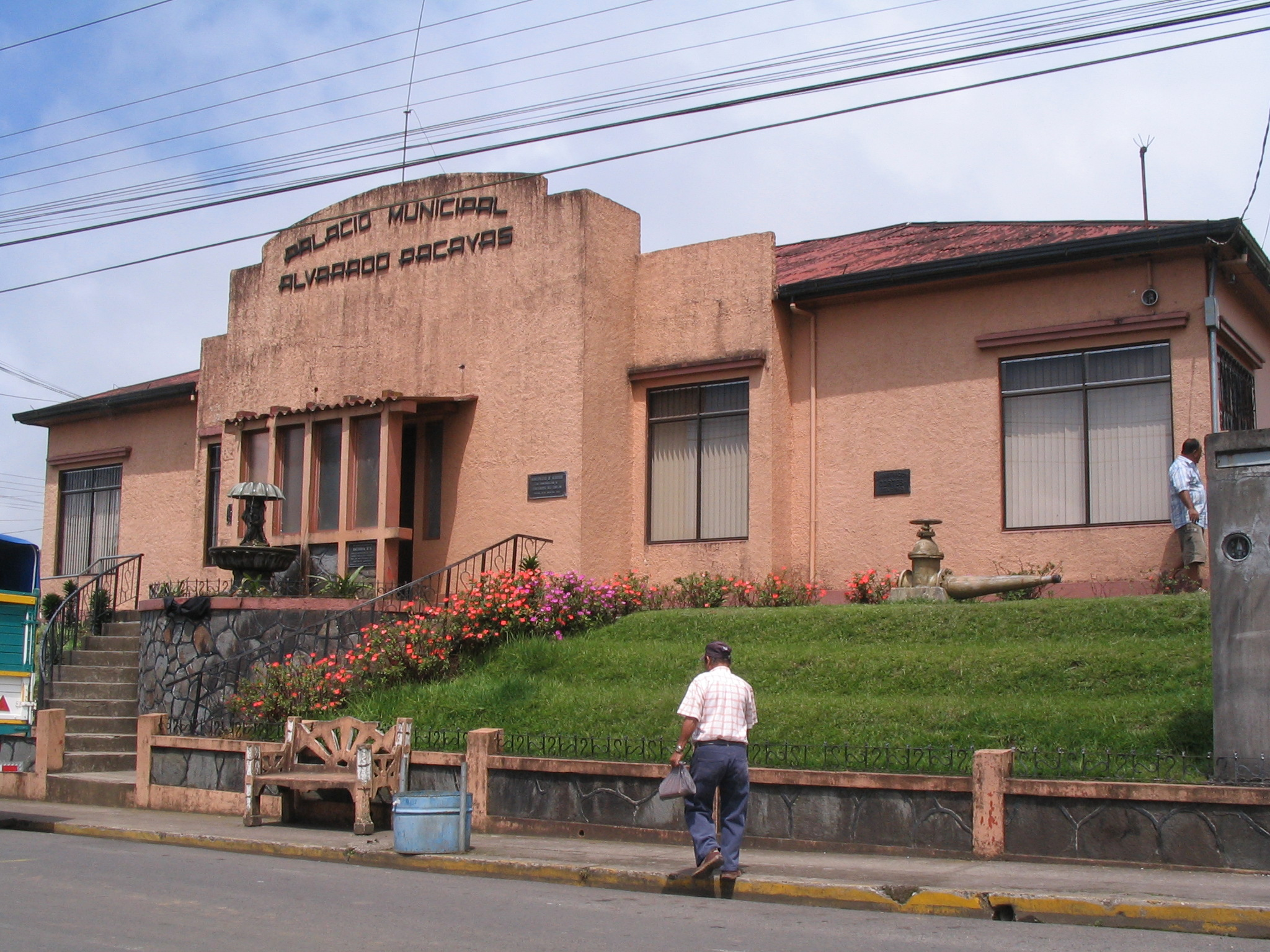
- Alvarado Municipality building

- Flag
- Interactive map of Alvarado
- Alvarado canton location in Costa Rica
- Coordinates: 9.9432302°N 83.8009515°W
- Country: Costa Rica
- Province: Cartago
- Creation: 9 July 1908
- Head city: Pacayas
- Districts: Districts: Pacayas; Cervantes; Capellades

Government
  - Type: Municipality
  - Body: Municipalidad de Alvarado

Area
  - Total: 81.06 km^{2} (31.30 sq mi)
- Elevation: 1,610 m (5,280 ft)

Population (2011)
  - Total: 14,312
  - Density: 176.6/km^{2} (457.3/sq mi)
- Time zone: UTC−06:00
- Canton code: 306
- Website: www.munialvarado.go.cr

Alvarado is a canton in the Cartago province of Costa Rica. The head city is in the Pacayas district.

== History ==
Alvarado was created on 9 July 1908 by decree 28.

== Geography ==
Alvarado has an area of 81.06 km^{2} (31.30 sq mi) and a mean elevation of 1,610 metres.

The defunct Atlantic railway line delineates a portion of the southern boundary of the oval-shaped canton, along with the Reventazón River. The Turrialba River on the east and the Birrís River on the west help establish the canton's northern limits, which reach into the Cordillera Central (Central Mountain Range).

== Districts ==
The canton of Alvarado is subdivided into the following districts:

1. Pacayas
2. Cervantes
3. Capellades

== Demographics ==
Historical population
Census	Pop.	±% p.a.
1927	3,568	—
1950	4,597	+1.11%
1963	6,465	+2.66%
1973	7,484	+1.47%
1984	8,338	+0.99%
2000	12,290	+2.45%
2011	14,312	+1.39%
2022	17,134	+1.65%
Source: Instituto Nacional de Estadística y Censos; Centro Centroamericano de Población

For the 2011 census, Alvarado had a population of 14,312 inhabitants.

== Transportation ==
=== Road transportation ===
The canton is covered by the following road routes:

- National Route 10
- National Route 219
- National Route 230
- National Route 402
- National Route 403
- National Route 404
- National Route 417
