= National Route 404 (Costa Rica) =

National Road Route in Costa Rica

National Tertiary Route 404
- Ruta nacional terciaria 404

Route information
- Maintained by Ministry of Public Works and Transport
- Length: 8.790 km (5.462 mi)

Location
- Country: Costa Rica
- Provinces: Cartago

Highway system
- National Road Network of Costa Rica
← Route 403	→ Route 405

National Tertiary Route 404, or just Route 404 (Spanish: Ruta Nacional Terciaria 404, or Ruta 404) is a National Road Route of Costa Rica, located in the Cartago province.

== Description ==
In Cartago province the route covers Paraíso canton (Paraíso, Santiago districts), Alvarado canton (Cervantes district).
