= National Route 219 (Costa Rica) =

National Road Route in Costa Rica

National Secondary Route 219
- Ruta nacional secundaria 219

Route information
- Maintained by Ministry of Public Works and Transport
- Length: 32.740 km (20.344 mi)

Location
- Country: Costa Rica
- Provinces: Cartago

Highway system
- National Road Network of Costa Rica
← Route 218	→ Route 220

National Secondary Route 219, or just Route 219 (Spanish: Ruta Nacional Secundaria 219, or Ruta 219) is a National Road Route of Costa Rica, located in the Cartago province.

== Description ==
It is the main access to Irazú Volcano National Park, it is possible from Route 219 to take Route 417 which is the main access to Turrialba Volcano National Park.

In Cartago province the route covers Cartago canton (Carmen and San Nicolás districts), Alvarado canton (Pacayas district), and Oreamuno canton (San Rafael, Cot, Potrero Cerrado, and Santa Rosa districts).
