= Cervantes District =

District in Alvarado canton, Cartago province, Costa Rica

Cervantes
- District
- Interactive map of Cervantes
- Cervantes district location in Costa Rica
- Coordinates: 9.8968615°N 83.8077308°W
- Country: Costa Rica
- Province: Cartago
- Canton: Alvarado

Area
  - Total: 15.19 km^{2} (5.86 sq mi)
- Elevation: 1,441 m (4,728 ft)

Population (2011)
  - Total: 6,230
  - Density: 410/km^{2} (1,060/sq mi)
- Time zone: UTC−06:00
- Postal code: 30602

Cervantes is a district of the Alvarado canton, in the Cartago province of Costa Rica.

== Geography ==
Cervantes has an area of 15.19 km^{2} and an elevation of 1,441 metres.

== Demographics ==
Historical population
Census	Pop.	±% p.a.
1883	772	—
1892	753	−0.28%
1927	1,133	+1.17%
1950	1,530	+1.31%
1963	2,377	+3.45%
1973	2,630	+1.02%
1984	3,138	+1.62%
2000	4,709	+2.57%
2011	6,230	+2.58%
2022	8,273	+2.61%
Source: Instituto Nacional de Estadística y Censos; Centro Centroamericano de Población

For the 2011 census, Cervantes had a population of 6,230 inhabitants.

== Transportation ==
=== Road transportation ===
The district is covered by the following road routes:

- National Route 10
- National Route 230
- National Route 403
- National Route 404
