= Cot District =

District in Oreamuno canton, Cartago province, Costa Rica

Cot
- District
- Interactive map of Cot
- Cot district location in Costa Rica
- Coordinates: 9.8888853°N 83.8676795°W
- Country: Costa Rica
- Province: Cartago
- Canton: Oreamuno

Area
  - Total: 15.05 km^{2} (5.81 sq mi)
- Elevation: 1,810 m (5,940 ft)

Population (2011)
  - Total: 9,630
  - Density: 640/km^{2} (1,660/sq mi)
- Time zone: UTC−06:00
- Postal code: 30702

Cot is a district of the Oreamuno canton, in the Cartago province of Costa Rica.

== Geography ==
Cot has an area of 15.05 km^{2} (5.81 sq mi) and an elevation of 1,810 metres.

== Demographics ==
Historical population
Census	Pop.	±% p.a.
1883	736	—
1892	817	+1.17%
1927	1,335	+1.41%
1950	1,806	+1.32%
1963	2,489	+2.50%
1973	3,492	+3.44%
1984	4,595	+2.53%
2000	7,813	+3.37%
2011	9,630	+1.92%
2022	10,739	+1.00%
Source: Instituto Nacional de Estadística y Censos; Centro Centroamericano de Población

At the 2011 census, Cot had a population of 9,630 inhabitants.

== Transportation ==
=== Road transportation ===
The district is covered by the following road routes:

- National Route 219
- National Route 230
- National Route 402
