= National Route 402 (Costa Rica) =

National Road Route in Costa Rica

National Tertiary Route 402
- Ruta nacional terciaria 402

Route information
- Maintained by Ministry of Public Works and Transport
- Length: 21.065 km (13.089 mi)

Location
- Country: Costa Rica
- Provinces: Cartago

Highway system
- National Road Network of Costa Rica
← Route 401	→ Route 403

National Tertiary Route 402, or just Route 402 (Spanish: Ruta Nacional Terciaria 402, or Ruta 402) is a National Road Route of Costa Rica, located in the Cartago province.

== Description ==
In Cartago province the route covers Alvarado canton (Pacayas district), Oreamuno canton (Cot, Santa Rosa districts).
