= Capellades District =

District in Alvarado canton, Cartago province, Costa Rica

Capellades
- District
- Interactive map of Capellades
- Capellades district location in Costa Rica
- Coordinates: 9.9536353°N 83.7950647°W
- Country: Costa Rica
- Province: Cartago
- Canton: Alvarado

Area
  - Total: 34.32 km^{2} (13.25 sq mi)
- Elevation: 1,653 m (5,423 ft)

Population (2011)
  - Total: 2,454
  - Density: 71.50/km^{2} (185.2/sq mi)
- Time zone: UTC−06:00
- Postal code: 30603

Capellades is a district of the Alvarado canton, in the Cartago province of Costa Rica.

== Geography ==
Capellades has an area of 34.32 km^{2} and an elevation of 1,653 metres.

== Demographics ==
Historical population
Census	Pop.	±% p.a.
1892	1,217	—
1927	681	−1.65%
1950	875	+1.10%
1963	1,293	+3.05%
1973	1,454	+1.18%
1984	1,440	−0.09%
2000	2,195	+2.67%
2011	2,454	+1.02%
2022	2,604	+0.54%
Source: Instituto Nacional de Estadística y Censos; Centro Centroamericano de Población

For the 2011 census, Capellades had a population of 2,454 inhabitants.

== Transportation ==
=== Road transportation ===
The district is covered by the following road routes:

- National Route 10
- National Route 230
- National Route 417
