= National Route 417 (Costa Rica) =

National Road Route in Costa Rica

National Tertiary Route 417
- Ruta nacional terciaria 417

Route information
- Maintained by Ministry of Public Works and Transport
- Length: 16.830 km (10.458 mi)

Location
- Country: Costa Rica
- Provinces: Cartago

Highway system
- National Road Network of Costa Rica
← Route 416	→ Route 502

National Tertiary Route 417, or just Route 417 (Spanish: Ruta Nacional Terciaria 417, or Ruta 417) is a National Road Route of Costa Rica, located in the Cartago province.

== Description ==
It is the main access to Turrialba Volcano National Park, coming from Route 219 which in turn is the main access to Irazú Volcano National Park.

In Cartago province the route covers Turrialba canton (Santa Cruz district), Alvarado canton (Pacayas, Capellades districts).

== History ==
As of December 2020 there is a conflict of interests between the owners of a farm, whom want to declare the route private, and the government. So an alternative route to the national park is signaled along the way.
