= National Route 230 (Costa Rica) =

National Road Route in Costa Rica

National Secondary Route 230
- Ruta nacional secundaria 230

Route information
- Maintained by Ministry of Public Works and Transport
- Length: 39.575 km (24.591 mi)

Location
- Country: Costa Rica
- Provinces: Cartago

Highway system
- National Road Network of Costa Rica
← Route 229	→ Route 231

National Secondary Route 230, or just Route 230 (Spanish: Ruta Nacional Secundaria 230, or Ruta 230) is a National Road Route of Costa Rica, located in the Cartago province.

== Description ==
In Cartago province the route covers Jiménez canton (Juan Viñas district), Turrialba canton (Turrialba, Santa Cruz, and Santa Rosa districts), Alvarado canton (Pacayas, Cervantes, and Capellades districts), and Oreamuno canton (Cot and Cipreses districts).
