= Basilica of Our Lady of the Angels, Cartago =

Roman Catholic basilica in Costa Rica

Basilica of Our Lady of the Angels Basilica de Nuestra Señora de los Ángeles
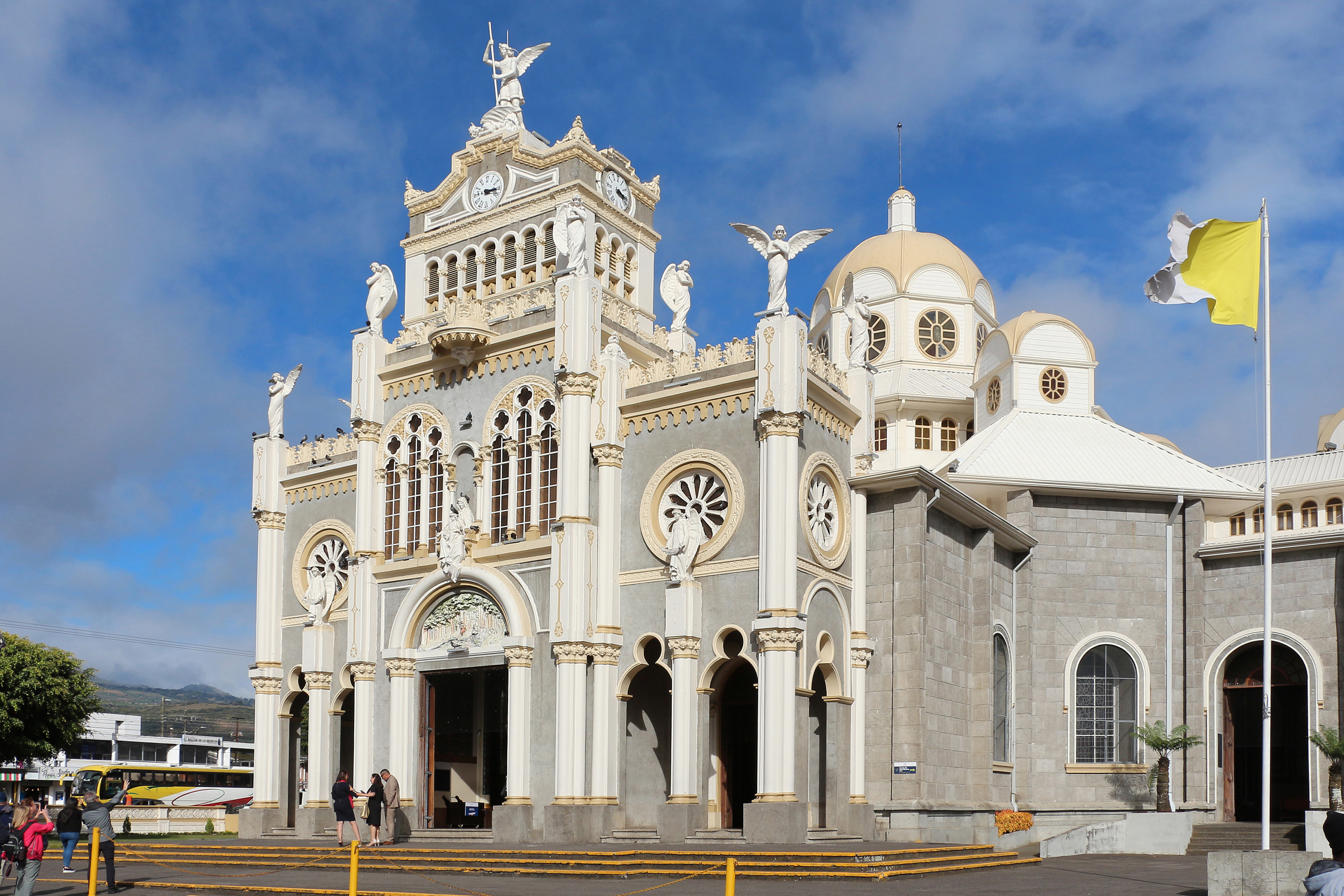
- View of the basilica from the plaza

Religion
- Affiliation: Roman Catholic
- Diocese: Diocese of Cartago
- Ecclesiastical or organisational status: minor basilica, National Architectural Heritage
- Leadership: Mons. José Rafael Quirós Quirós

Location
- Location: Cartago, Costa Rica
- Interactive map of Basilica of Our Lady of the Angels; Basilica de Nuestra Señora de los Ángeles
- Coordinates: 09°51′50″N 83°54′46″W

Architecture
- Architect: Luis Llach Llagostera
- Type: Church
- Style: Byzantine style
- Groundbreaking: 1912
- Completed: 1924

Website
- Official Website

The Basílica de Nuestra Señora de los Ángeles (Our Lady of the Angels Basilica) is a Roman Catholic basilica in Costa Rica, located in the city of Cartago and dedicated to the Virgen de los Pardos, officially known as Virgen de los Ángeles (the Lady of the Angels). The basilica was built in 1639 and was partially destroyed by an earthquake. The basilica has since been restored and constitutes a unique mix of colonial architecture as well as 19th-century Byzantine style; the current building dates back to 1939.

The Basilica of Our Lady of the Angels is consecrated to the Virgin of Nuestra Señora de los Ángeles, a small representation of the Virgin Mary carrying the infant Jesus, said to have been discovered by a peasant girl in Cartago.

== Gallery ==
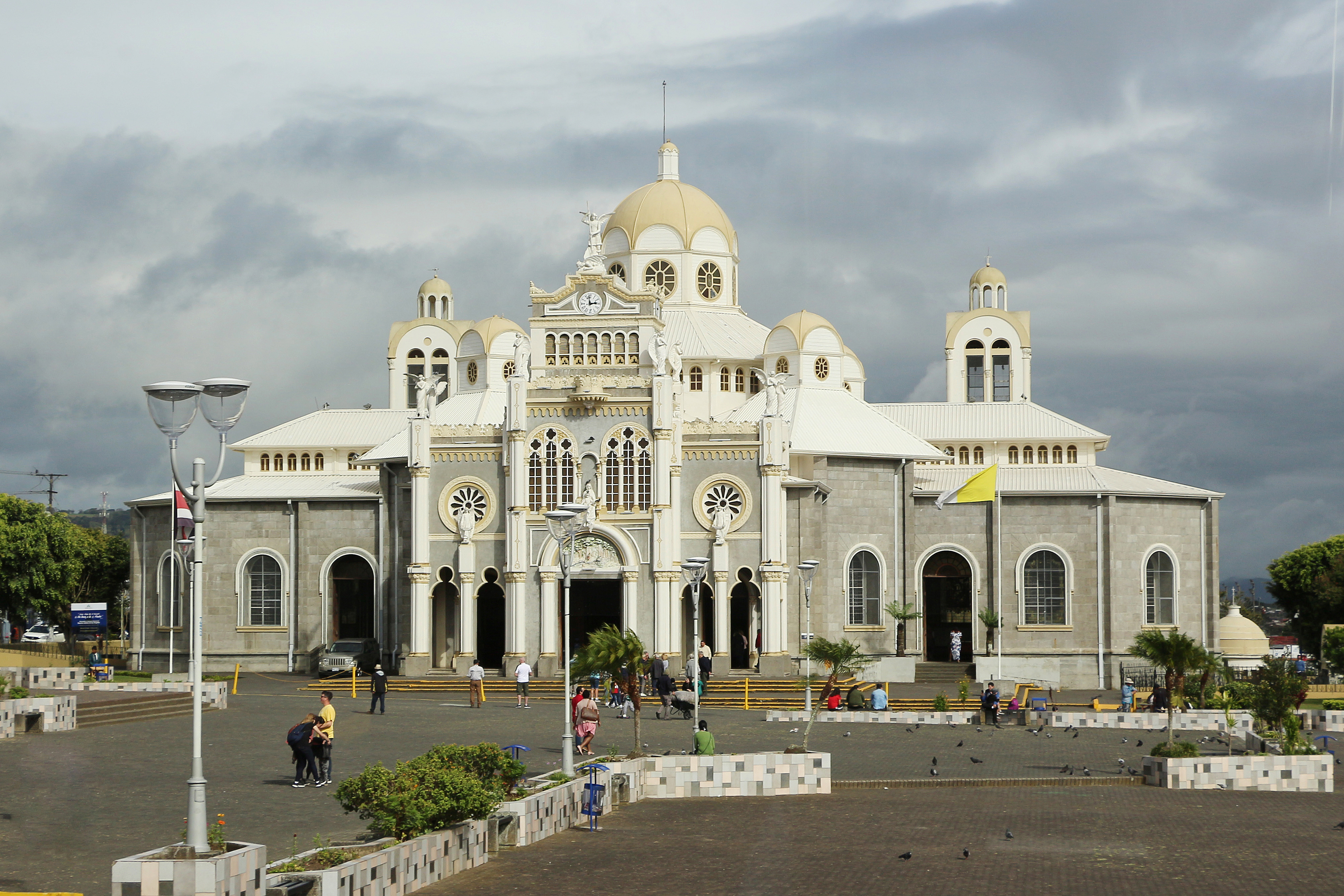

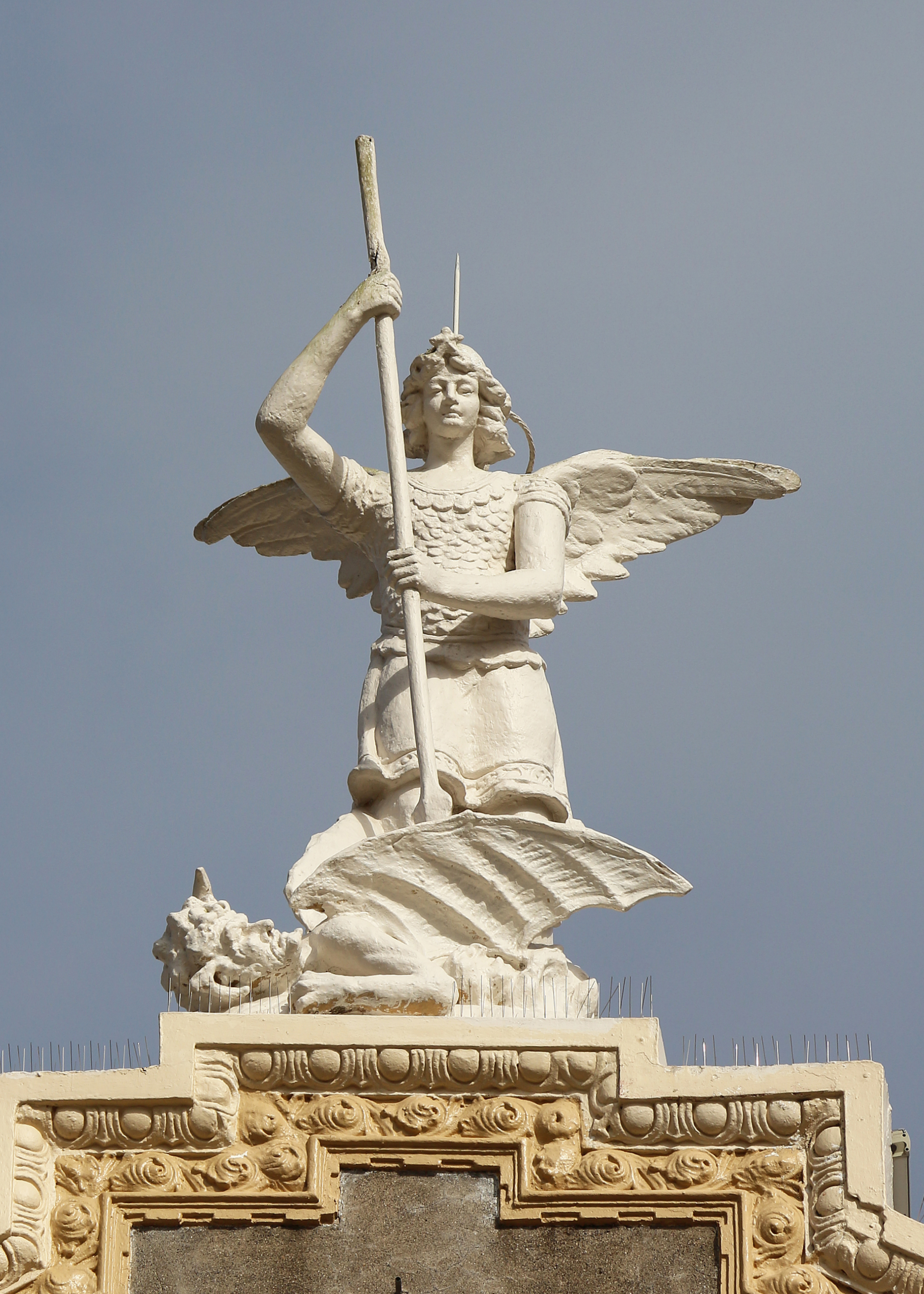

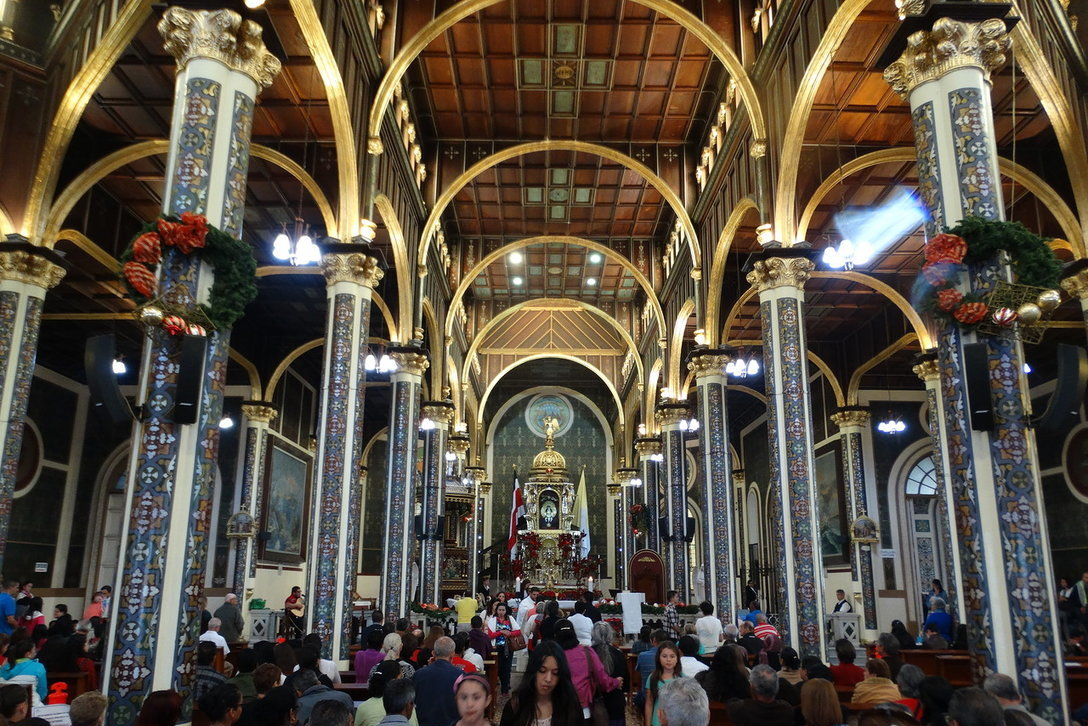

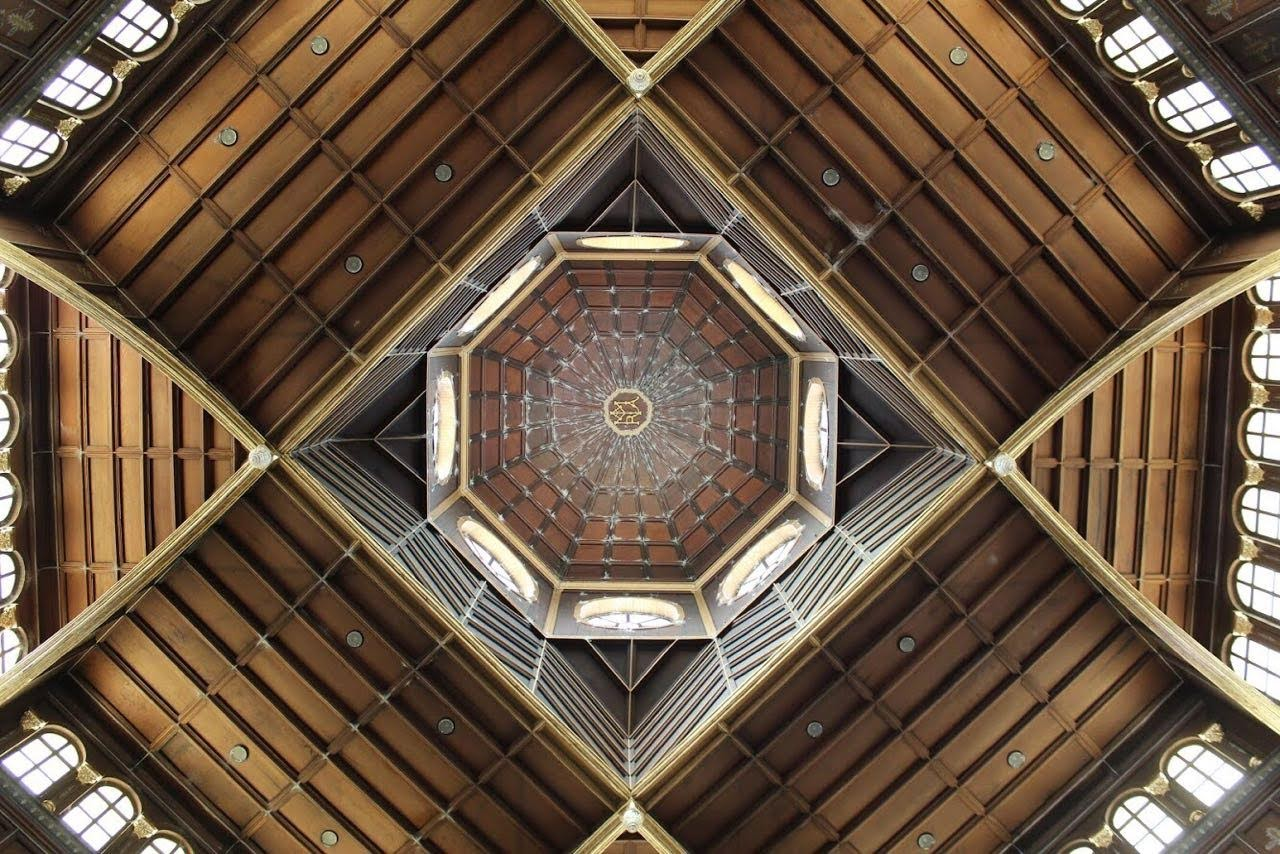

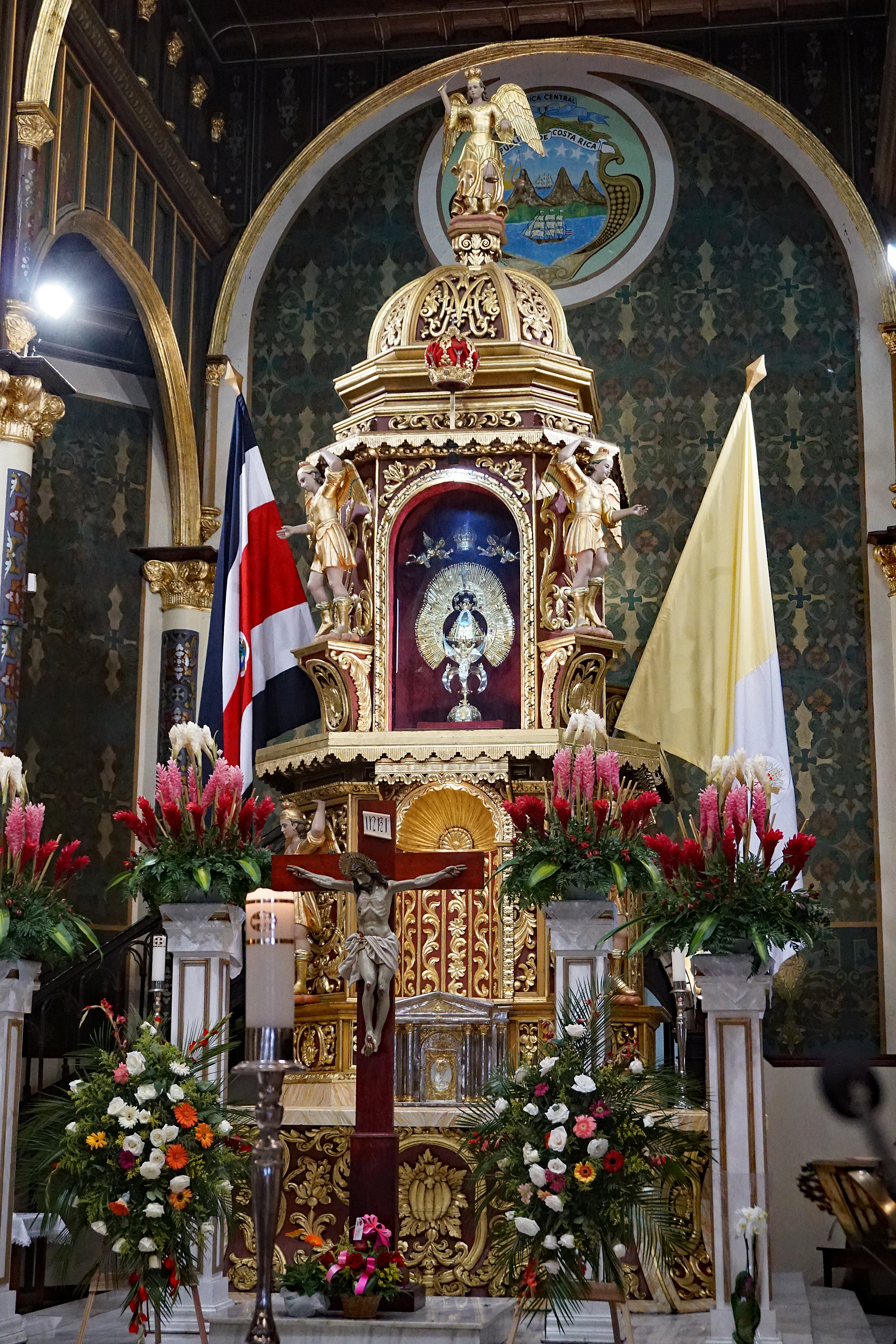

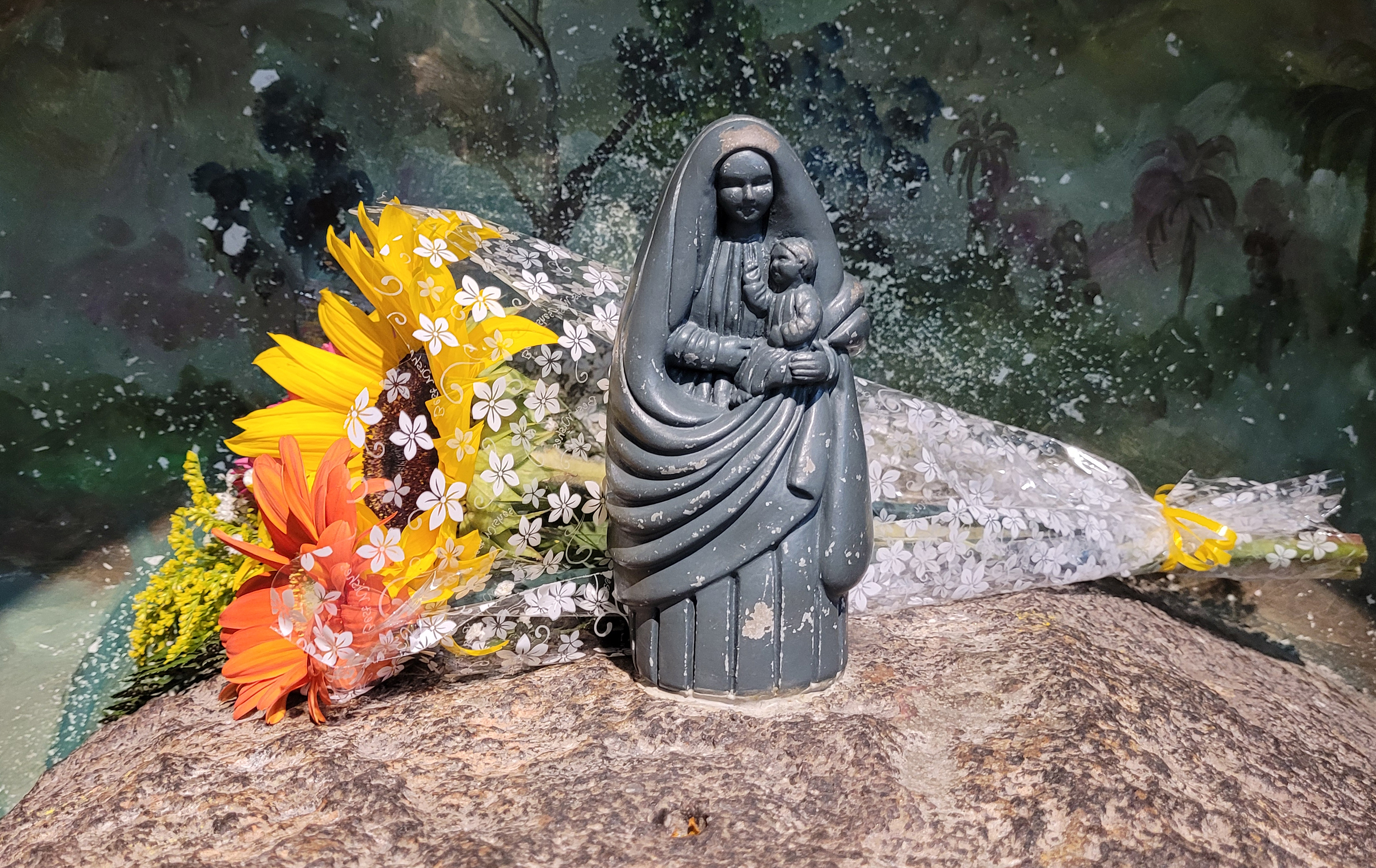

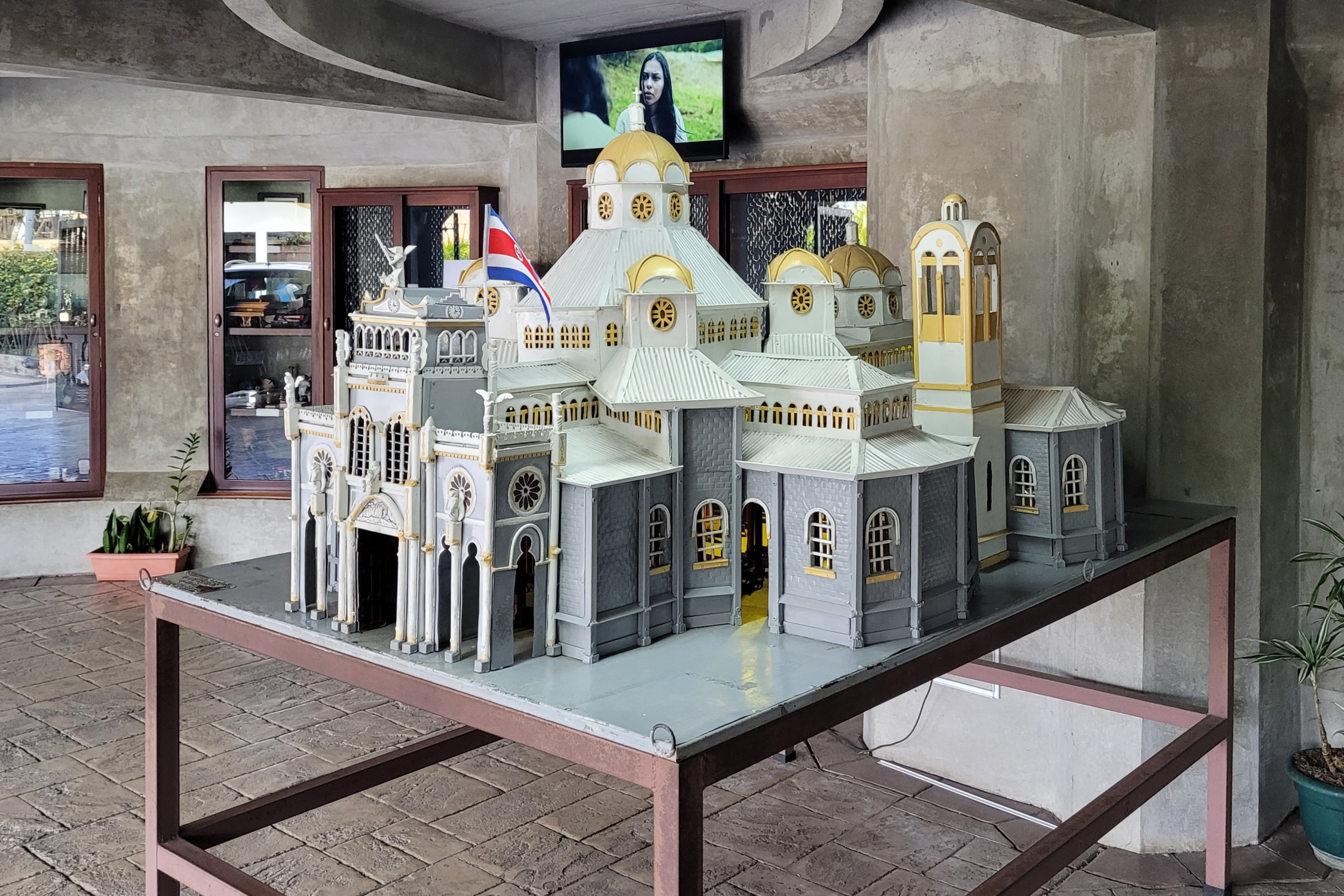

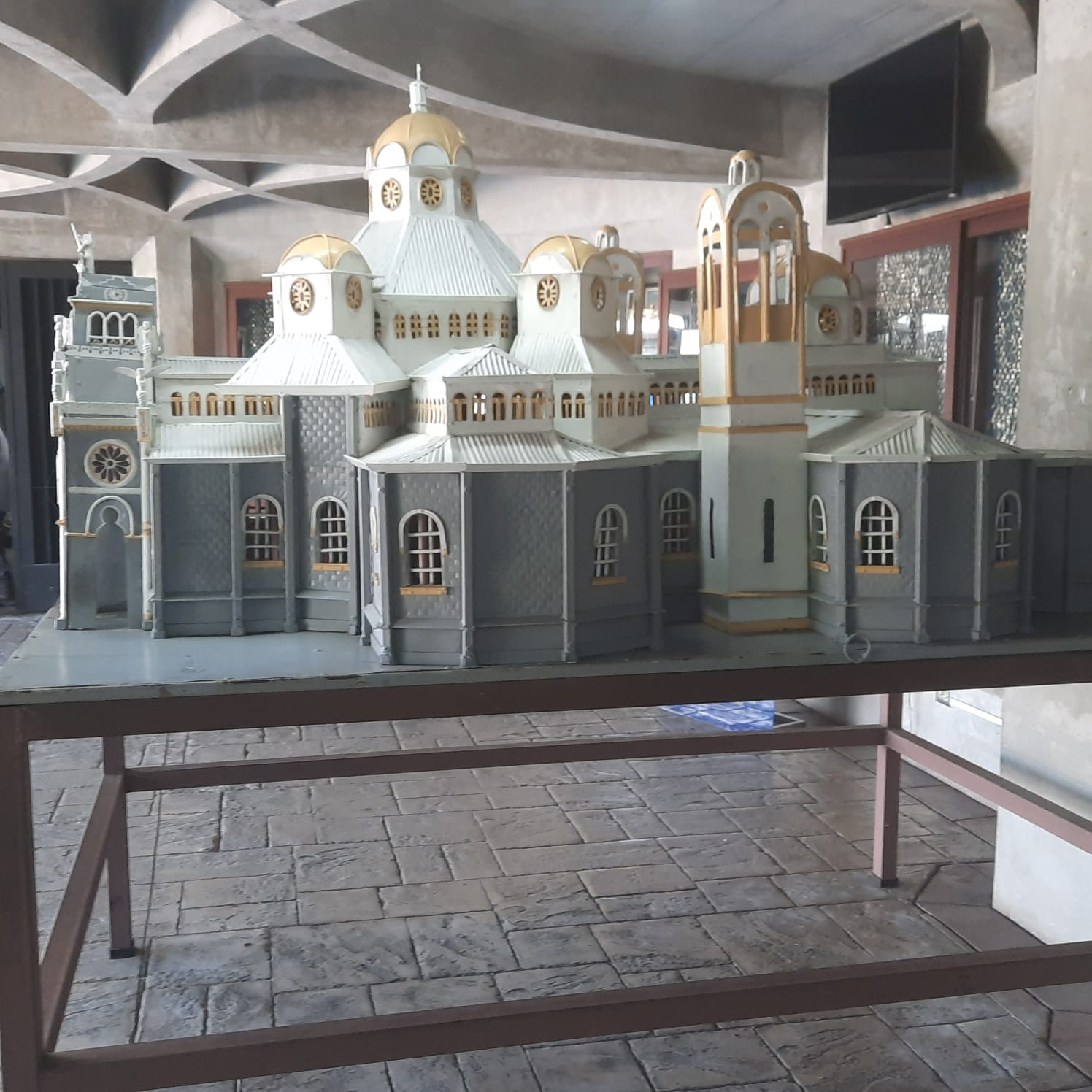

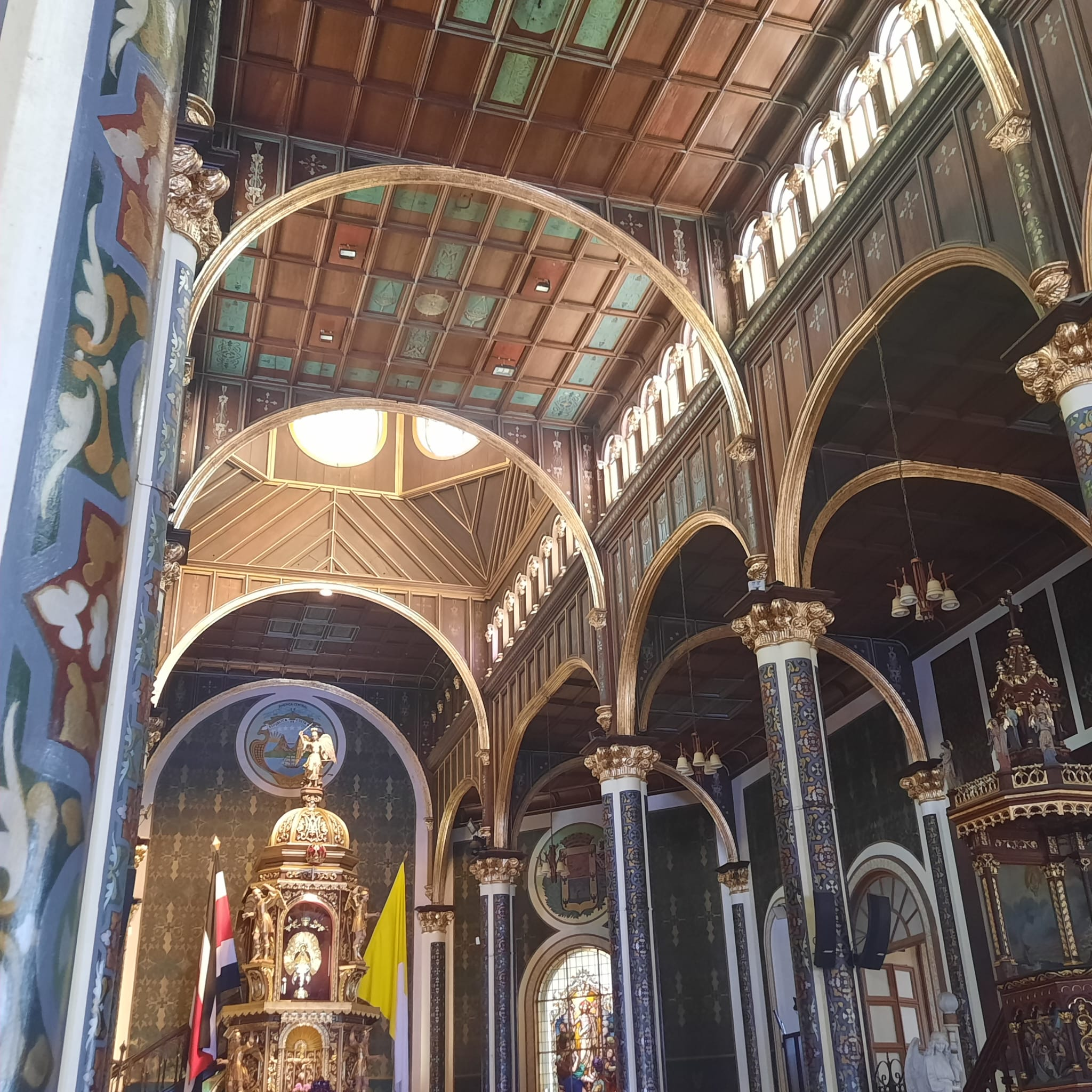

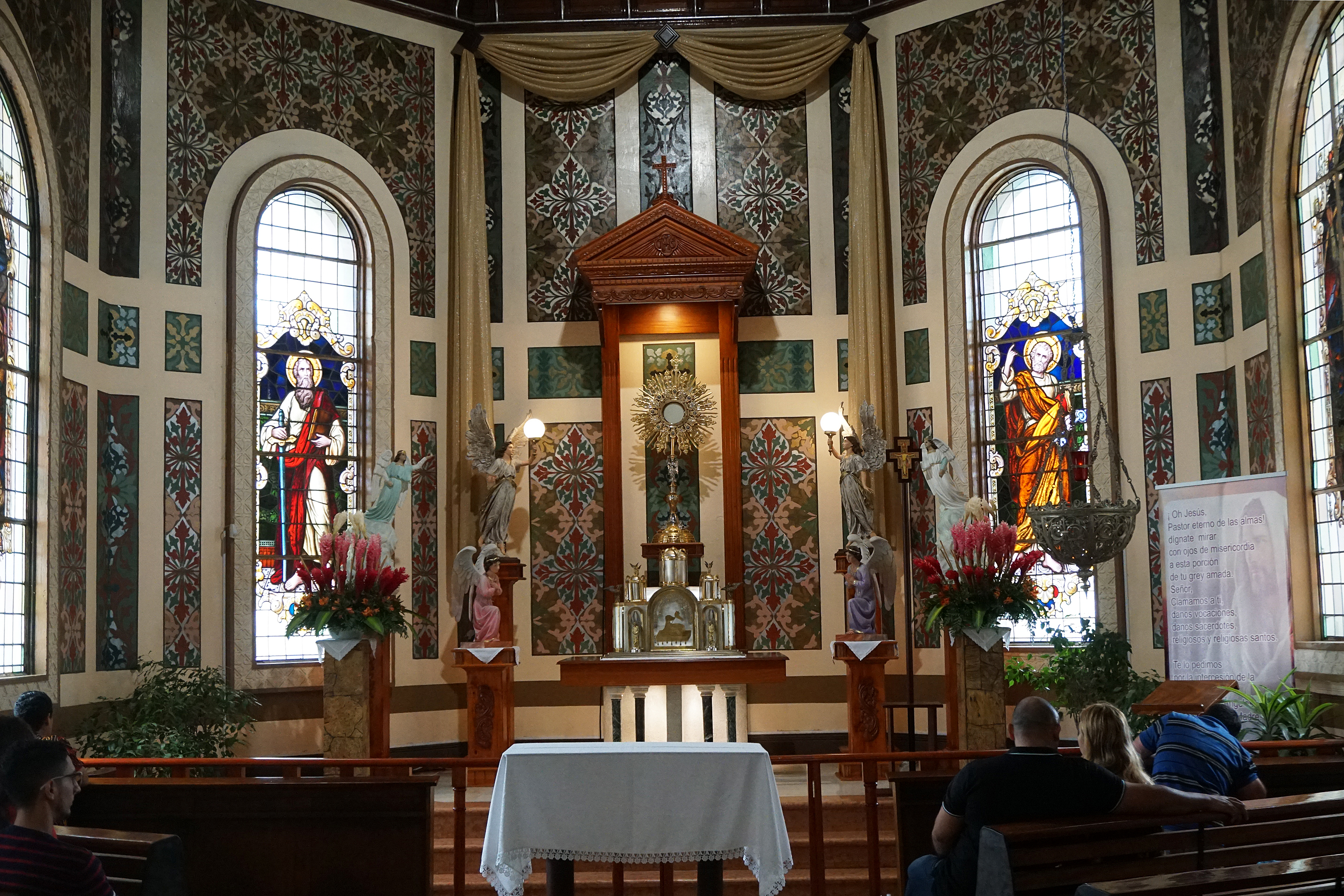

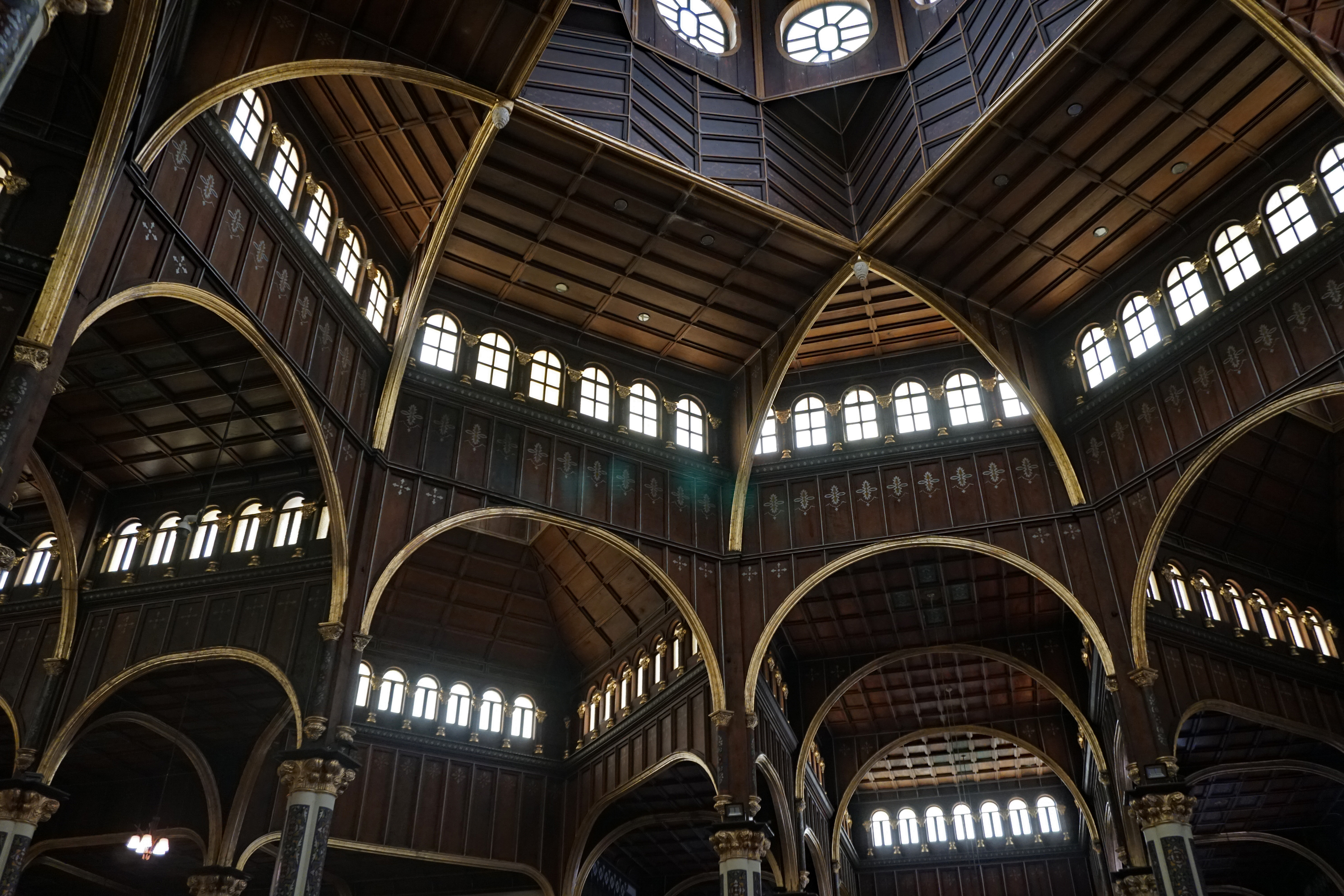

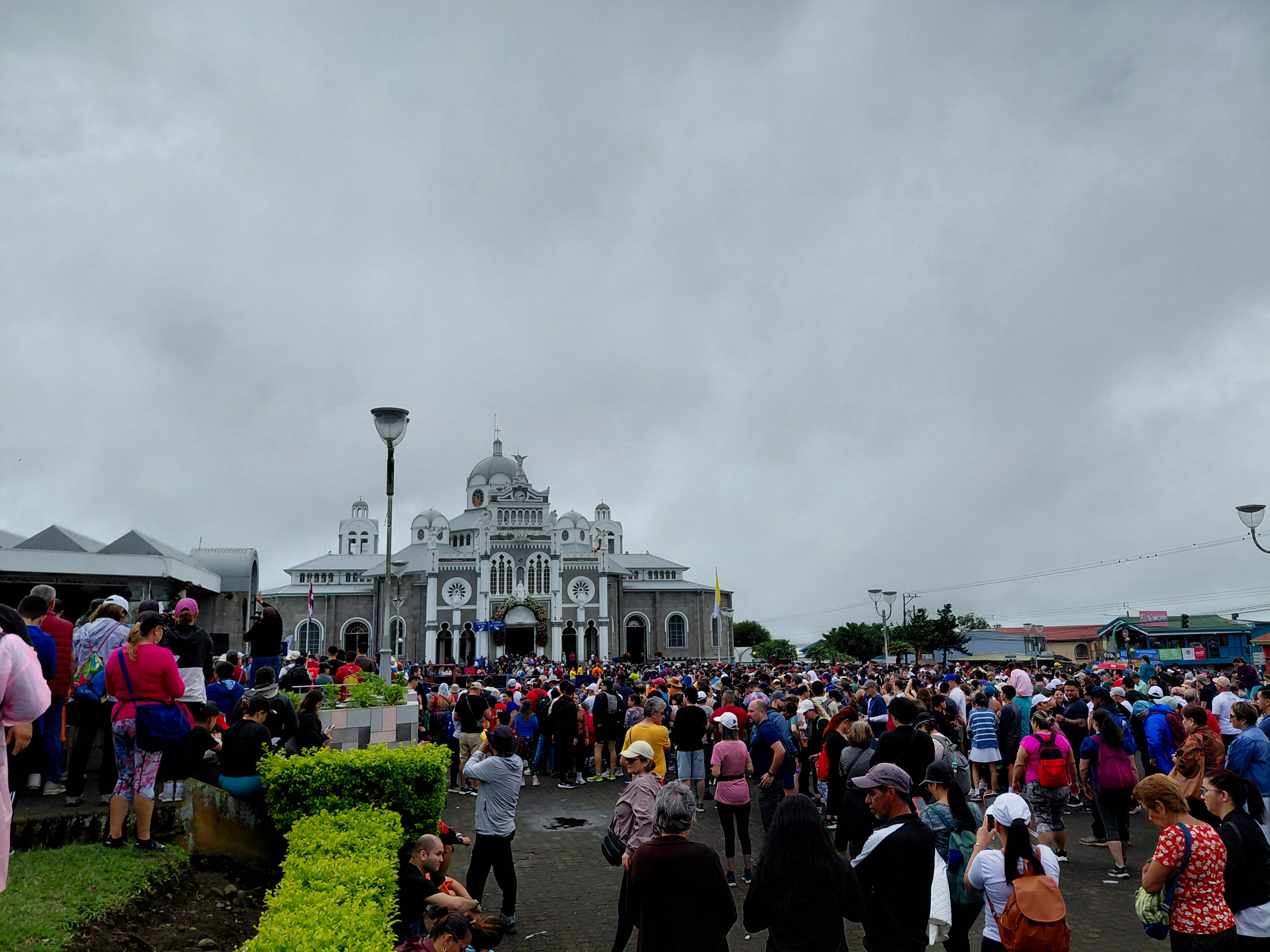
