= Diocese of Abydos =

Diocese of Abydos (Greek: Επισκοπή Αβύδου) is titular see of the Ecumenical Patriarchate of Constantinople.

== History ==
Abydos (Ancient Greek: Ἄβυδος, Latin: Abydus) was an ancient city in Mysia. It was located at the Nara Burnu promontory on the Asian coast of the Hellespont, opposite the ancient city of Sestos, and near the city of Çanakkale in Turkey.

=== Medieval bishopric ===
The bishopric of Abydus appears in all the Notitiae Episcopatuum of the Patriarchate of Constantinople from the mid-7th century until the time of Andronikos III Palaiologos (1341), first as a suffragan of Cyzicus and then from 1084 as a metropolitan see without suffragans. The earliest bishop mentioned in extant documents is Marcian, who signed the joint letter of the bishops of Hellespontus to Emperor Leo I the Thracian in 458, protesting about the murder of Proterius of Alexandria. A letter of Peter the Fuller (471–488) mentions a bishop of Abydus called Pamphilus. Ammonius signed the decretal letter of the Council of Constantinople in 518 against Severus of Antioch and others. Isidore was at the Third Council of Constantinople (680–681), John at the Trullan Council (692), Theodore at the Second Council of Nicaea (787). An unnamed bishop of Abydus was a counsellor of Emperor Nikephoros II in 969.

Seals attest Theodosius as bishop of Abydos in the 11th century, and John as metropolitan bishop of Abydos in the 11/12th century. Abydos remained a metropolitan see until the city fell to the Turks in the 14th century.

=== Modern bishopric ===
In the 19th century the bishopric of Abydos was revived as the titular see of the Patriarchate of Constantinople.

- Nikodimos Papadopoulos (April 19, 1892 - 23 May 1906)
- Germanos Garofallidis (March 25, 1931 - September 3, 1936)
- Ireneos Kasimatis (November 8, 1951 - October 1, 1961)
- Gerasimos Papadopoulos (May 20, 1962 - June 12, 1995)
- Simeon Kruzhkov (May 16 — September 21, 1998)
- Kyrillos Katerelos (since February 23, 2008)
