= Oreamuno (canton) =

Canton in Cartago province, Costa Rica

- Canton
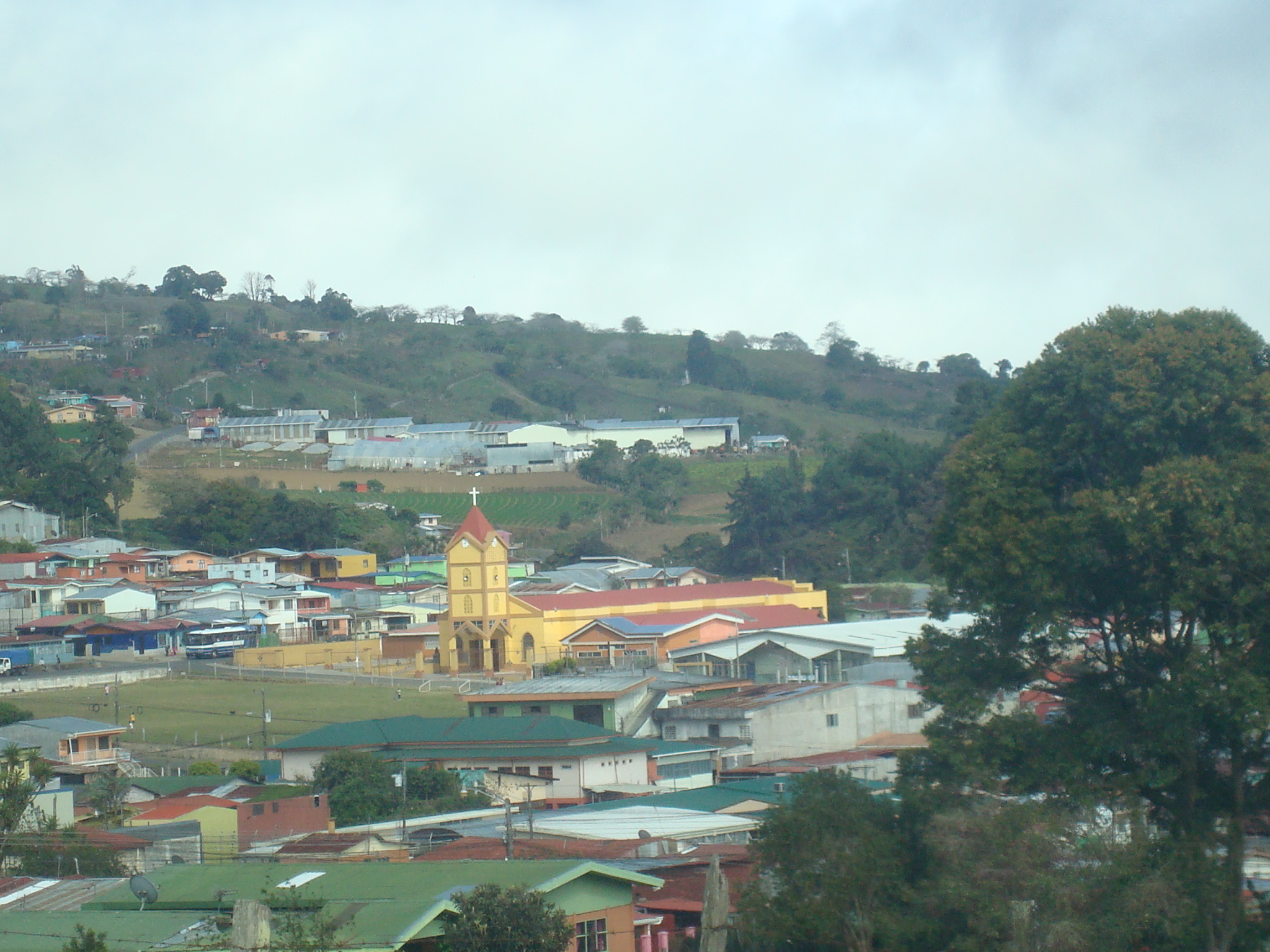
- Cot town, in Oreamuno canton.

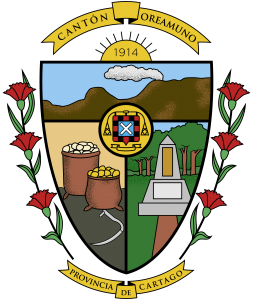
- Flag Seal
- Oreamuno canton
- Oreamuno canton location in Costa Rica
- Coordinates: 9.9972861°N 83.8769838°W
- Country: Costa Rica
- Province: Cartago
- Creation: 17 August 1914
- Head city: San Rafael
- Districts: Districts: San Rafael; Cot; Potrero Cerrado; Cipreses; Santa Rosa

Government
  - Type: Municipality
  - Body: Municipalidad de Oreamuno

Area
  - Total: 202.31 km^{2} (78.11 sq mi)
- Elevation: 1,861 m (6,106 ft)

Population (2011)
  - Total: 45,473
  - Density: 224.77/km^{2} (582.15/sq mi)
- Time zone: UTC−06:00
- Canton code: 307
- Website: www.oreamuno.go.cr

Oreamuno is a canton in the Cartago province of Costa Rica. The head city is in San Rafael district.

== History ==
Oreamuno was created on 17 August 1914 by decree 68.

== Geography ==
Oreamuno has an area of 202.31 km^{2} (78.11 sq mi) and a mean elevation of 1,861 metres.

The canton extends from its suburban head city of San Rafael northward into the Cordillera Central (Central Mountain Range). Irazú Volcano looms large in the northern reaches of the canton.

== Districts ==
The canton of Oreamuno is subdivided into the following districts:

1. San Rafael
2. Cot
3. Potrero Cerrado
4. Cipreses
5. Santa Rosa

== Demographics ==
Historical population
Census	Pop.	±% p.a.
1927	5,143	—
1950	7,568	+1.69%
1963	12,035	+3.63%
1973	17,517	+3.82%
1984	24,145	+2.96%
2000	39,032	+3.05%
2011	45,473	+1.40%
2022	48,911	+0.66%
Source: Instituto Nacional de Estadística y Censos; Centro Centroamericano de Población

For the 2011 census, Oreamuno had a population of 45,473 inhabitants.

== Transportation ==
=== Road transportation ===
The canton is covered by the following road routes:

- National Route 10
- National Route 219
- National Route 230
- National Route 233
- National Route 401
- National Route 402

=== Rail transportation ===
The Interurbano Line operated by Incofer goes through this canton.
