= Pacayas =

District in Alvarado canton, Cartago province, Costa Rica

- District
- Pacayas district
- Pacayas district location in Costa Rica
- Coordinates: 9.9377396°N 83.8174516°W
- Country: Costa Rica
- Province: Cartago
- Canton: Alvarado

Area
  - Total: 29.68 km^{2} (11.46 sq mi)
- Elevation: 1,735 m (5,692 ft)

Population (2011)
  - Total: 5,628
  - Density: 189.6/km^{2} (491.1/sq mi)
- Time zone: UTC−06:00
- Postal code: 30601

Pacayas is a district of the Alvarado canton, in the Cartago province of Costa Rica.

== Geography ==
Pacayas has an area of 29.68 km^{2} (11.46 sq mi) and an elevation of 1,735 metres.

== Demographics ==
Historical population
Census	Pop.	±% p.a.
1927	1,754	—
1950	2,192	+0.97%
1963	2,795	+1.89%
1973	3,400	+1.98%
1984	3,760	+0.92%
2000	5,386	+2.27%
2011	5,628	+0.40%
2022	6,257	+0.97%
Source: Instituto Nacional de Estadística y Censos; Centro Centroamericano de Población

For the 2011 census, Pacayas had a population of 5,628 inhabitants.

== Transportation ==
=== Road transportation ===
The district is covered by the following road routes:

- National Route 219
- National Route 230
- National Route 402
- National Route 417

== Economy ==
It is the home of the cooperative Coopebaires R. L., the main wholesale distributor of potatoes, carrots, broccoli and other fresh vegetables in the north region of Cartago Province.
