= Cipreses =

District in Oreamuno canton, Cartago province, Costa Rica

- District
- Interactive map of Cipreses
- Cipreses district location in Costa Rica
- Coordinates: 9.8938256°N 83.8419995°W
- Country: Costa Rica
- Province: Cartago
- Canton: Oreamuno

Area
  - Total: 9.31 km^{2} (3.59 sq mi)
- Elevation: 1,700 m (5,600 ft)

Population (2011)
  - Total: 3,700
  - Density: 400/km^{2} (1,000/sq mi)
- Time zone: UTC−06:00
- Postal code: 30704

Cipreses is a district of the Oreamuno canton, in the Cartago province of Costa Rica.

== Geography ==
Cipreses has an area of 9.31 km^{2} (3.59 sq mi) and an elevation of 1,700 metres.

== Demographics ==
Historical population
Census	Pop.	±% p.a.
1927	811	—
1950	548	−1.69%
1963	886	+3.76%
1973	1,248	+3.49%
1984	1,748	+3.11%
2000	2,887	+3.19%
2011	3,700	+2.28%
2022	4,287	+1.35%
Source: Instituto Nacional de Estadística y Censos; Centro Centroamericano de Población

For the 2011 census, Cipreses had a population of 3,700 inhabitants.

== Transportation ==
=== Road transportation ===
The district is covered by the following road routes:

- National Route 230
