= San Rafael District, Oreamuno =

District in Oreamuno canton, Cartago province, Costa Rica

San Rafael
- District
- San Rafael district
- San Rafael district location in Costa Rica
- Coordinates: 9.8701713°N 83.8951285°W
- Country: Costa Rica
- Province: Cartago
- Canton: Oreamuno

Area
  - Total: 10.27 km^{2} (3.97 sq mi)
- Elevation: 1,453 m (4,767 ft)

Population (2011)
  - Total: 27,248
  - Density: 2,653/km^{2} (6,872/sq mi)
- Time zone: UTC−06:00
- Postal code: 30701

San Rafael is a district of the Oreamuno canton, in the Cartago province of Costa Rica.

== Geography ==
San Rafael has an area of 10.27 km^{2} (3.97 sq mi) and an elevation of 1,453 metres.

== Demographics ==
Historical population
Census	Pop.	±% p.a.
1883	1,750	—
1927	2,554	+0.86%
1950	3,685	+1.61%
1963	6,667	+4.67%
1973	10,434	+4.58%
1984	14,824	+3.24%
2000	23,707	+2.98%
2011	27,248	+1.27%
2022	28,424	+0.38%
Source: Instituto Nacional de Estadística y Censos; Centro Centroamericano de Población

For the 2011 census, San Rafael had a population of 27,248 inhabitants.

== Transportation ==
=== Road transportation ===
The district is covered by the following road routes:

- National Route 10
- National Route 219
- National Route 233

=== Rail transportation ===
The Interurbano Line operated by Incofer goes through this district.
