= Bernhard August Thiel =

Bernardo Augusto Thiel y Hoffmann
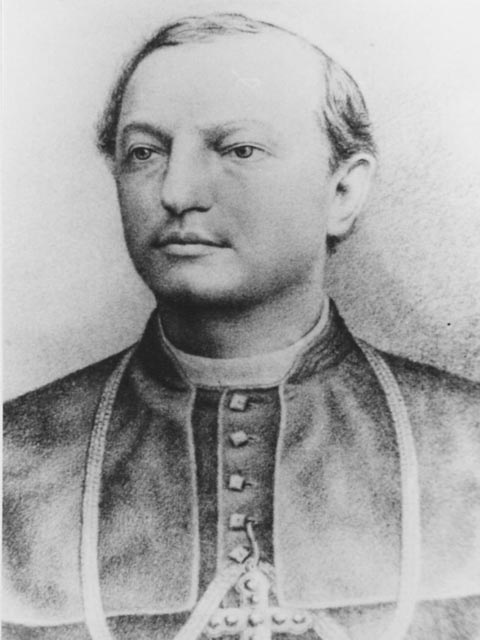
- Commemorative plaque for Bernhard August Thiel in the church of San Lorenzo in Wuppertal-Elberfeld

Orders
- Ordination: June 7, 1874 in París, France by Luigi Bruschetti
- Consecration: September 5, 1880 by Luigi Bruschetti
- Rank: Bishop

Personal details
- Born: March 1, 1850 Elberfeld, North German Confederation
- Died: September 9, 1901 San José, Costa Rica
- Denomination: Roman Catholic

Bernardo Augusto Thiel y Hoffmann was a Catholic priest from Germany and the second bishop of Costa Rica from 1880 until his death in 1901.

He was born in Elberfeld, North German Confederation, on April 1, 1850. His parents were José Thiel Keller y Elena Hoffmann Bruckman. He was ordained as a priest in Paris on June 7, 1874 as a Lazarist or Paulist. He was in Ecuador from 1874 to 1877, and was then moved to Costa Rica to lead the congregation at the seminary in San José.

He was preconized as Bishop of Costa Rica on February 27, 1880, and consecrated on September 5 by Luigi Bruschetti, titular Bishop of Abydos and administrator of the Diocese of Costa Rica.

He was involved in pastoral duties and religious instruction. He was expelled from the country during the governorship of Próspero Fernández Oreamuno in July 1884, but he returned on May 27, 1886. He introduced the Catholic social teaching with his 1893 pastoral letter Sobre el justo salario de los obreros y artesanos ("On just salaries for workers and artisans"). He worked to promote Catholic religion in regions inhabited by indigenous peoples in the north and south of the country.

He wrote various books on religious, historical, and linguistic topics.

He died in San José on September 9, 1901. He was named Benemérito de la Patria (a national honorary title awarded for distinguished service) in 1921.
