= Virgen de los Ángeles =

Patron saint of Costa Rica

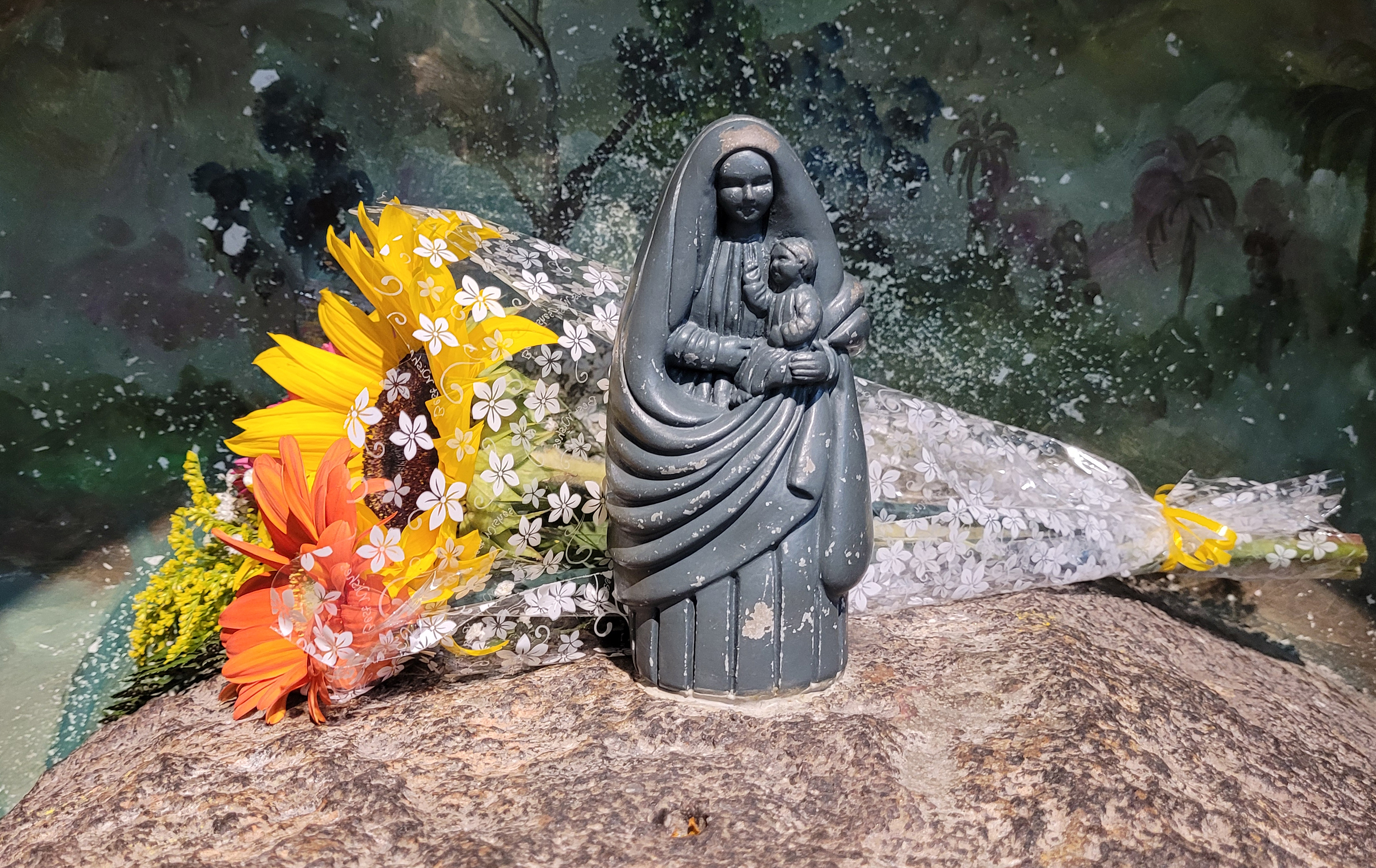
- La negrita in the Basílica de Nuestra Señora de los Ángeles
- Location: Basílica de Nuestra Señora de los Ángeles, Cartago
- Date: 2 August 1635
- Witness: Juana Pereira
- Type: Marian apparition
- Approval: 25 April 1926 (canonical coronation granted by Pope Pius XI)
- Patronage: Costa Rica
- Feast day: 2 August

The Virgen de los Ángeles (lit. 'Virgin of the Angels') is a Black Madonna venerated as the patron saint of Costa Rica. Also known as la negrita (lit. 'the little black lady'), her feast day on 02 August is a national holiday.

== Background ==
The image stands about 3 inches (7.6 cm), and is an indigenous or mixed race representation of the Virgin Mary.

According to tradition, the statuette was found on 2 August 1635, the feast of Our Lady of the Angels, by a native woman named Juana Pereira. When she tried to take the statuette with her, it twice miraculously reappeared where she had found it. The townspeople then built a shrine around the statuette.

In 1824, the Virgin was declared Costa Rica's patron saint. La negrita is now enclosed in gold and jewel-studded vestments and an aureole above the main altar of the Basílica de Nuestra Señora de los Ángeles in Cartago. Every 2 August, the anniversary of the statuette's discovery, pilgrims travel 22 kilometres (14 mi) from San José to the basilica. Many penitents complete the last few hundred meters of the pilgrimage route on their knees. This basilica is equally visited by tourists and locals.

Pope Pius XI granted a canonical coronation of the image, which was held in 1926. In 2014, a replica of the statue was enthroned in Vatican City.

== See also ==
- Black Madonna
