= Pejibaye =

Pejibaye may refer to:

- Bactris gasipaes
- Pejibaye River, Costa Rica
- Pejibaye Town, Costa Rica
- Pejibaye District, Jiménez, Costa Rica
- Pejibaye District, Pérez Zeledón, Costa Rica
