= Orosi =

Orosi can refer to:

== Places ==
- Orosi, Cartago, Costa Rica, a district
- Orosi River, Costa Rica
- Orosí Volcano Costa Rica
- Ersi, Marand, Iran, a village also known as Orosi
- Orosi, California, United States, a census-designated place

== Other uses ==
- Marcela Oroši, 21st century Croatian singer
- Orosi High School, Orosi, California

== See also ==
- East Orosi, California, an unincorporated community
