= Ujarrás =

- Village
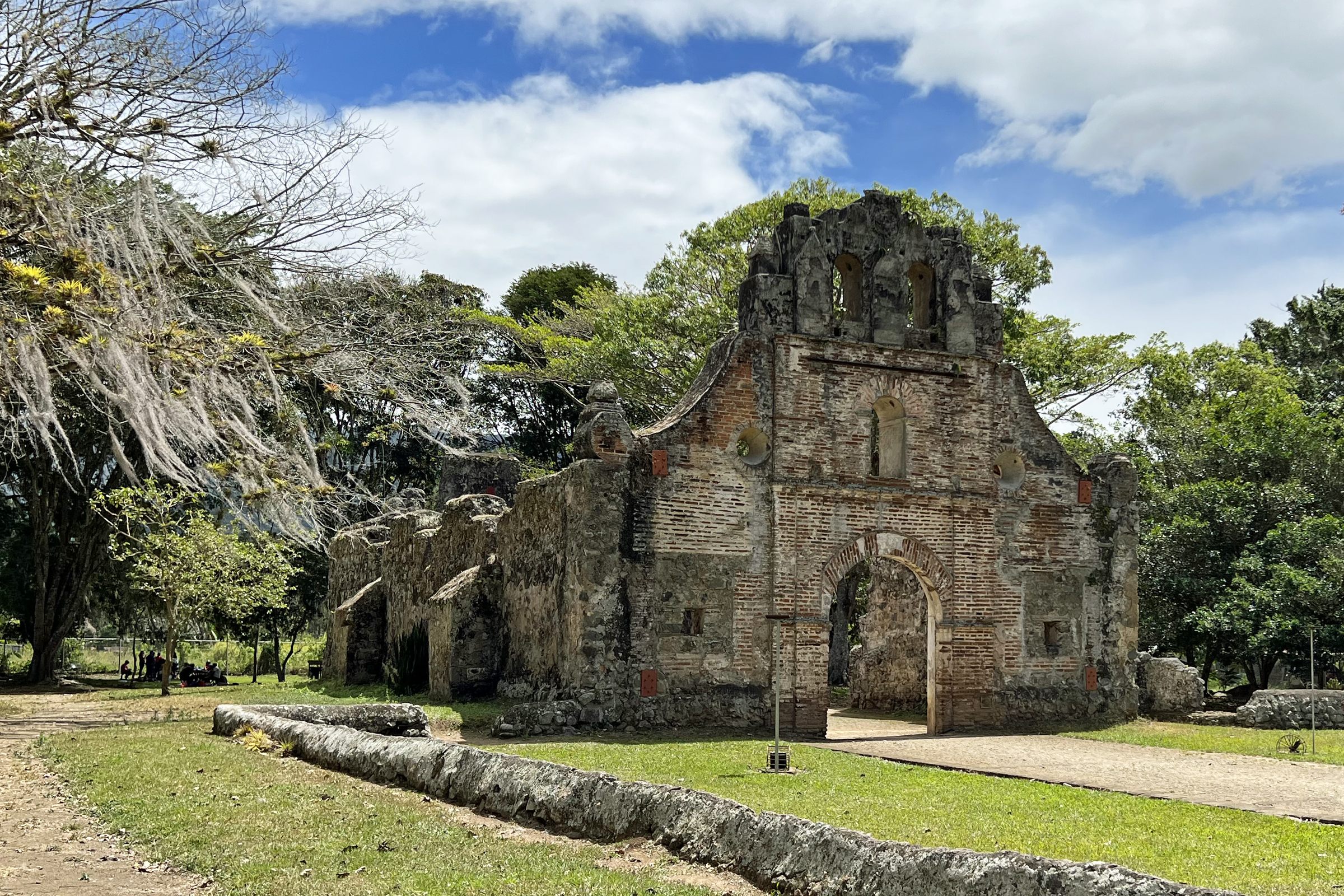
- The church of Nuestra Señora de la Limpia Concepción del Rescate de Ujarrás in 2022

- Location in Costa Rica
- Coordinates: 9°50′N 83°48′W
- Country: Costa Rica
- Province: Cartago Province
- Canton: Paraíso Canton
- District: Paraíso
- Established: 1575 (?)

Government
- Time zone: UTC-6 (Central Standard Time)
- Climate: Am

Ujarrás is a village and historical site in the Orosí Valley of Cartago Province in central Costa Rica, southeast of the provincial capital of Cartago. It lies near the northeastern bank of the man-made Lake Cachí, created by the damming of the Reventazon River. The dam lies adjacent to the village. The village is connected to Cachí, on the other side of the lake.

== Geography ==
Ujarrás is located in Paraíso district of Paraíso canton, in Cartago Province, geographically it is in a deep valley northeast of the town of Orosí, on the banks of the Cachí Reservoir. The valley of Orosi, which is crisscrossed by many rivers and streams, has coffee and flower plantations. The other landmarks near the town, apart from one of the oldest churches in Costa Rica, are the Cachí Dam, the Tapantí National Park (part of La Amistad WHS) and Lankester botanical gardens.

== History ==
The ruins of one of the oldest churches in Costa Rica is located in Ujarrás, the church of "Nuestra Señora de la Limpia Concepción del Rescate de Ujarrás", which was built in colonial times between 1686 and 1693.

Church ruin and information plaque in 2023

Local legend has it that a painting of the Virgin was found in a box by native Huetar Indian fishermen who brought it to the village, and a church was thus built on this site by the locals to commemorate the Virgin. Another version of this tradition is that an Indian fisherman found a box containing the image of the Virgin Mary and the Spanish Colonial church named Nuestra Senora de la Limpia Concepcion was thus built around that image as it could not be moved elsewhere. Initially a hermitage made of straw was built and indigenous people called the image Virgin Mary as "The Queen of the Valleys". It was built between 1575 and 1580. Over the years the image attained fame due to many miracles that it is said to have performed for the villagers. It is also said that when the English pirate Henry Morgan attacked the village in 1666, the Virgin Mary came to their rescue to repulse the attack.

In 1833, the village was subject to a devastating flood which led to the government passing a decree to move the village to a safer place. The town was located in one of the poorest regions of the Spanish empire, which lacked economic resources to sustain its population. The climate of the place was also adverse and diseases played havoc with the local population. Furthermore, the buildings constructed with fragile local material could not withstand earthquakes. Considering the magnitude of the health problem and floods faced by the people in 1833, the then Constitutional Assembly of the Commonwealth of Costa Rica decreed that the people move and establish a new township.

People then abandoned Ujarrás between the latter years of the 18th century and the early years of the 19th and established the township of Paraíso near the Llanos de Santa Lucía. They expected that the new township would be more suitable in terms of the health and comfort of its residents. However, moving to a new location did not improve the health conditions or the demography or educational standards of the town's people. It has been conjectured that economic rather than health dictated the move. Recent studies by the priest and historian Manuel Benavides, have suggested that the move was due to political reasons. The ruined church stands as witness to the history of the town.

The indigenous population of Ujarrás, mainly mestizos, became extinct in the early 18th century. The famous priest Florencio del Castillo, who was President of the Courts of Cádiz was born here. Thanks to his efforts, Ujarrás villa was erected in 1813.

Every year an annual mass is held on the Sunday closest to April 14 to celebrate the feast of La Virgen de Ujarrás.

== Church restoration ==
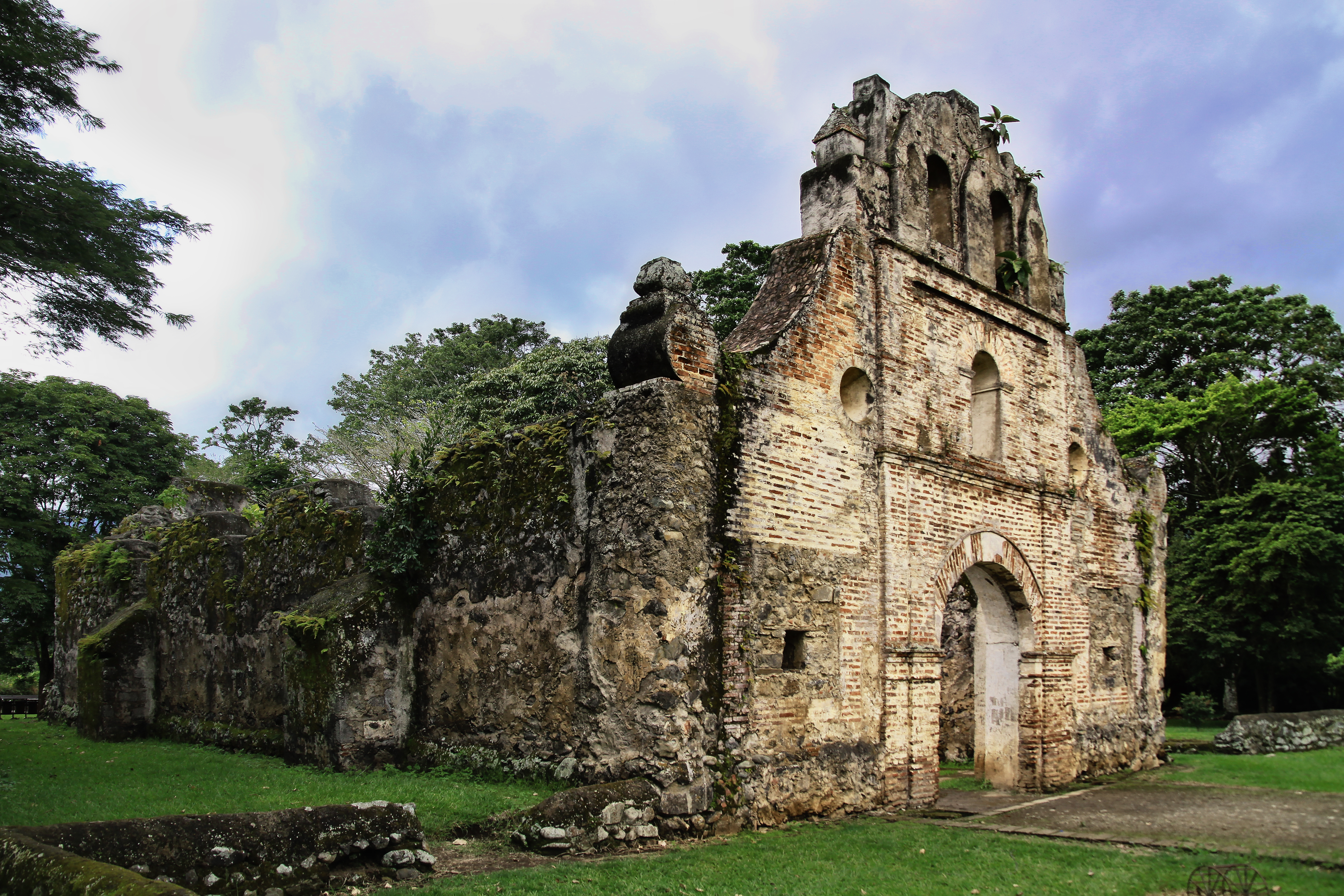
Church ruins in 2009 before the restoration and seismic retrofitting executed in 2010.

The church in Ujarrás has been restored several times. The church was built with limestone in a construction method known as calicanto (stone masonry). The facades, the altar, and other parts of the church are now restored. During the 2010 restoration campaign, both the main and back facades were retrofitted to made the old structures more resistant to seismic activity, common in Costa Rica. Additional works included proper drainage near the foundations to avoid water reaching the old walls.

The Virgin of the Holy Conception of Ujarrás, Saint Patron of the Colony, was originally installed in the church. However, this image was shifted to the new township to the Sanctuary of Paradise. The image has nice features of face and hands and is well preserved. A religious procession of this statue of the Saint Patron is held every year at Paraíso on 16 April and it is a pilgrimage to most Costa Ricans to recount their history and to express their reverence to the Virgin Mary.

== Heritage status ==
The Costa Rican government recognizes the church today as a National Monument. The heritage site, which was submitted for inclusion in the World Heritage List in 1980 is now not part of the current Tentative List of Heritage Sites maintained by UNESCO. However, a review of the site mentions that "While it definitively does not have probably an OUV for itself, combined with other colonial monuments and/or Orosi valley, it compares to other sites already in the list."

Ujarrás (brand), is also a brand name in Costa Rica of jellies and other products, established in 1962.
