= Roger Moya =

Costa Rican wood scientist and forestry researcher

- Born: May 14, 1968 (age 58); Cachí, Costa Rica
- Education: Technological Institute of Costa Rica (BSc); University of Concepción (MSc); University of São Paulo (PhD)
- Occupations: Researcher; educator; wood scientist; forestry scientist
- Years active: Since 1993
- Known for: Research on tropical wood species and biomass
- Awards: Fellow of the IAWS (2019); Académico de Número of the National Academy of Sciences of Costa Rica (2019)
- Scientific career
- Workplaces: Technological Institute of Costa Rica
- Thesis: "Wood anatomy and basic density of Gmelina arborea under different climatic and management conditions in Costa Rica" (2005)
- Doctoral advisor: Mario Tomazello Filho

Roger Alonso Moya Roque (Cachí, Costa Rica, 14 May 1968), known as Roger Moya R., is a Costa Rican wood scientist and forestry researcher, who is professor and senior researcher at the School of Forest Engineering of the Technological Institute of Costa Rica (TEC), where he has worked since 1993.

He is an elected Fellow of the International Academy of Wood Science (IAWS), and in 2019 he was elected an Académico de Número of the National Academy of Sciences of Costa Rica for his academic work.

== Early life and education ==
He was born in Cachí, in the canton of Paraíso, Cartago Province in Costa Rica. He graduated from the Liceo de Paraíso in 1985.

He studied wood engineering at the Technological Institute of Costa Rica from 1986 to 1990. He subsequently obtained a master's degree in forest sciences from the University of Concepción in Chile in 2000 and a doctorate degree in forest sciences from the Universidade de São Paulo in Brazil in 2005.

== Research career ==
From 1990 to 1993, Moya worked as an operations engineer in the Costa Rican company, Cabo Rico S.A. In 1993, he joined the School of Forest Engineering at the Technological Institute of Costa Rica as a member of its teaching and research staff. Moya's research has concentrated particularly on the technological properties of tropical woods.

At the Technological Institute of Costa Rica, Moya has coordinated and participated in research on the physical, mechanical, chemical and anatomical properties of plantation-grown species, as well as their drying, preservation, processing and potential industrial uses. Also, he has contributed to research on wood modification and improvement of plantation-grown wood.

== Recognition ==
Moya was elected a fellow, titled as Académico de Número, of the National Academy of Sciences of Costa Rica in 2019 for his yearlong academic and research work. In the same year, he received his highest award by being elected as a Fellow at the International Academy of Wood Science.

Until September 2026, his research work has received more than 5,300 citations at Google Scholar.

== Personal life ==
Moya has resided in Paraíso, Cartago, in Costa Rica. He has been married to Elizabeth Román Calderón since 1997, and they have two adult sons, Cristofer and Cristian.

== Selected publications ==
- Moya, R. et al. (2014). A review of heartwood properties of Tectona grandis trees from fast-growth plantations (176 cit.)
- Moya, R. and Tenorio, C. (2013). Fuelwood characteristics and its relation with extractives and chemical properties of ten fast-growth species in Costa Rica (128 cit.)
