= Jiménez (canton) =

Canton in Cartago province, Costa Rica

- Canton
- Flag
- Interactive map of Jiménez
- Jiménez canton location in Costa Rica
- Coordinates: 9.819549°N 83.6993734°W
- Country: Costa Rica
- Province: Cartago
- Creation: 19 August 1903
- Head city: Juan Viñas
- Districts: Districts: Juan Viñas; Tucurrique; Pejibaye

Government
  - Type: Municipality
  - Body: Municipalidad de Jiménez

Area
  - Total: 286.43 km^{2} (110.59 sq mi)
- Elevation: 862 m (2,828 ft)

Population (2011)
  - Total: 14,669
  - Density: 51.213/km^{2} (132.64/sq mi)
- Time zone: UTC−06:00
- Canton code: 304
- Website: munijimenez.go.cr

Jiménez is a canton in the Cartago province of Costa Rica. The head city is in Juan Viñas district.

== History ==
Jiménez was created on 19 August 1903 by decree 84.

== Geography ==
Jiménez has an area of 286.43 km^{2} (110.59 sq mi) and a mean elevation of 862 metres.

The Turrialba River forms the northern boundary of the canton of Jiménez, with the Reventazón River and Atirro River establishing the eastern border and the Pejibaye River delineating a major portion of the canton's border on the west.

== Districts ==
The canton of Jiménez is subdivided into the following districts:

1. Juan Viñas
2. Tucurrique
3. Pejibaye
4. La Victoria

== Demographics ==
Historical population
Census	Pop.	±% p.a.
1927	5,892	—
1950	7,731	+1.19%
1963	10,439	+2.34%
1973	11,523	+0.99%
1984	11,861	+0.26%
2000	14,046	+1.06%
2011	14,669	+0.40%
2022	18,710	+2.24%
Source: Instituto Nacional de Estadística y Censos; Centro Centroamericano de Población

For the 2011 census, Jiménez had a population of 14,669 inhabitants.

== Transportation ==
=== Road transportation ===
The canton is covered by the following road routes:

- National Route 10
- National Route 225
- National Route 230
- National Route 408

== Economy ==
Its main economic activity is the sugar cane plantations operated by the Ingenio Juan Viñas, which factory produces more than 20,000 tons of sugar annually.
