= Florencio del Castillo =

Costa Rican cleric and politician (1778–1834)

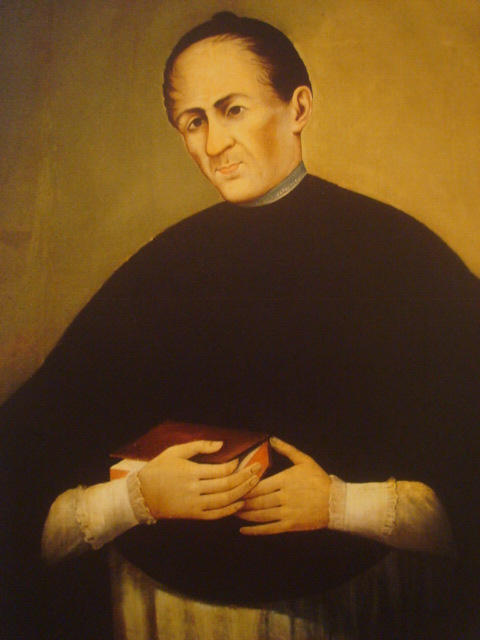
- Born: October 17, 1778; Ujarrás, Captaincy General of Guatemala, New Spain
- Died: November 26, 1834 (aged 56); Oaxaca, Mexico
- Occupation(s): Cleric, politician

Florencio del Castillo (October 17, 1778 – November 26, 1834) was a Costa Rican cleric and politician.

== Early life ==
Castillo was born on October 17, 1778, in Ujarrás, near Cartago, the colonial capital of the Provincia de Costa Rica, part of New Spain. He was the third child of Cecilia del Castillo y Villagra (sometimes called Cecilia del Castillo y Solano), widow of a Frenchman, François Lafons. His father is not known; it is possible he was the illegitimate son of the village priest, Luis San Martín de Soto, a Capuchin friar. He grew up in the friary of Our Lady of the Immaculate Conception de Rescate de Ujarrás, where he earned his living cleaning and working as an altar boy. Cecilia del Castillo belonged to a distinguished family in Costa Rica and possessed some money that allowed her to send her son to the Seminario Conciliar in León, Nicaragua (which in 1812 was converted into the University of León, Nicaragua), to pursue an ecclesiastical career. After being distinguished for his intelligence and spotless record, Castillo presented brilliant exam results, obtained a baccalaureate and was ordained a Catholic priest in 1802. The next year he was already a professor of geometry at the same university with an official recommendation.

Castillo returned to Costa Rica preceded by the fame that his accomplishments had gained him in Nicaragua, and in 1806 he was named pastor of the incipient town of Villahermosa (later Alajuela; but aspiring to a higher destination, he returned in 1808 to León, entering the Tridentine University where he gained the post of professor of philosophy, which had been one of his most gifted disciplines, and later the more important charges of synodal examiner, prosecutor and vice-rector.

These rapid promotions, combined with the prestige won during his short return to Costa Rica, meant that when it came time to select a deputy for the Province of Costa Rica to the Cortes of Cádiz in Spain, convened for the salvation of Spain's independence--which was threatened by the formidable power of Napoleon who invaded the nation--his name was included, along with that of Friar José Antonio Taboada y José María Zamora.

== Deputy to the Cortes ==
In 1810, Costa Rica selected Castillo to represent it in the Cortes of Spain, where he was called the "American Mirabeau" for his magnificent oratory. He was distinguished for his struggle in favor of the Indians and blacks and achieved the abolition of the Mita, the Encomienda, Indian tribute and the Repartimiento. He presided over the courts for a brief period. He also campaigned against other forms of racial discrimination. He also represented Costa Rica in the ordinary courts of 1813–1814, until their dissolution by Fernando VII.

== Deputy to the Mexican Congress and Imperial Council ==
After the dissolution of the Courts, Castillo moved to Mexico, where he represented Costa Rica in the Constituent Congress of 1822. Afterwards he was a member of the Council of State of Emperor Agustín I (Agustín de Iturbide).

== Death ==
Castillo died in Oaxaca on November 26, 1834, where he was a canon of the diocese and administrator of the diocese. In 1971, his remains were returned to Costa Rica, where they were interred in a mausoleum built in the central park of the town of Paraíso, near his birthplace of Ujarrás. His remains rested there until they were stolen in September 2011.

The Legislative Assembly of Costa Rica declared him a "Benemérito de la Patria", or "Worthy Citizen of the Fatherland". The highway between San José and Cartago bears his name.

In 1971, the Mexican State of Oaxaca awarded Florencio del Castillo a posthumous medal for his outstanding effort.
