= Orosi, Cartago =

District in Paraíso canton, Cartago province, Costa Rica

Orosi
- District
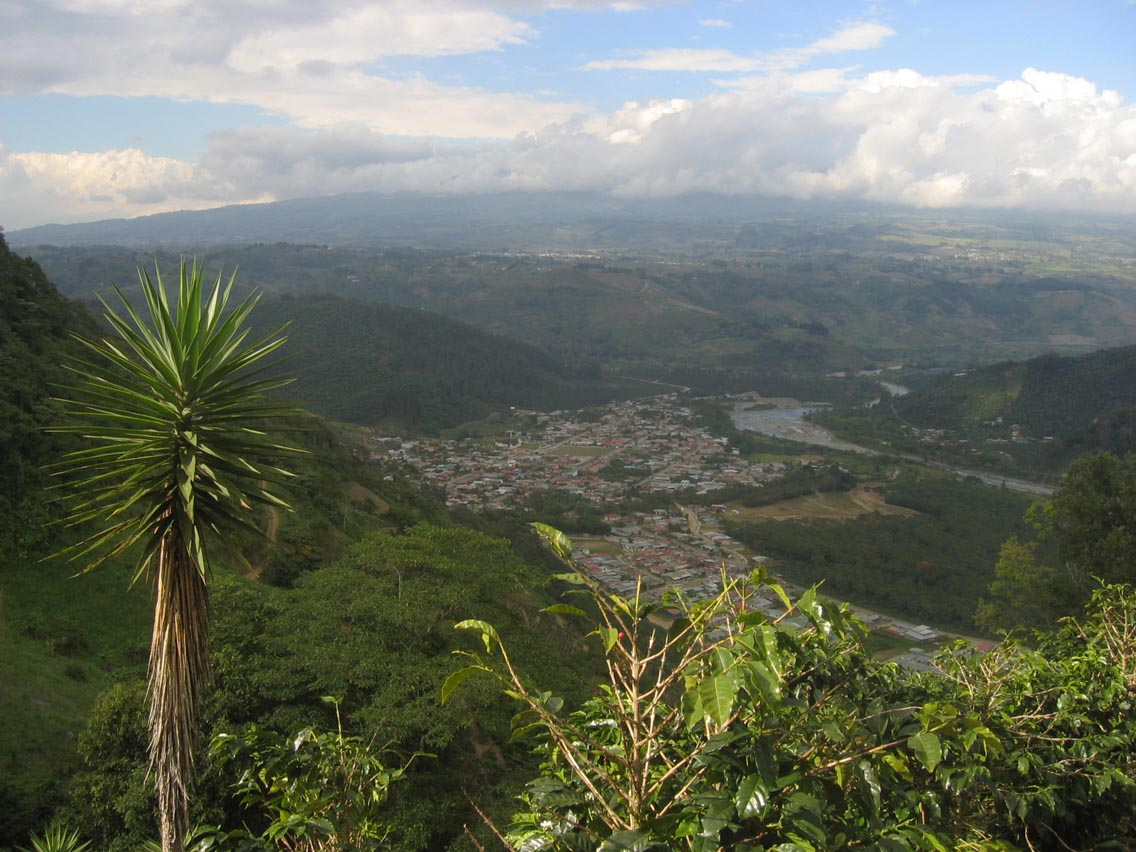
- Orosi seen from the South
- Orosi district
- Orosi district location in Costa Rica
- Coordinates: 9.6874392°N 83.7609867°W
- Country: Costa Rica
- Province: Cartago
- Canton: Paraíso

Area
  - Total: 376.41 km^{2} (145.33 sq mi)
- Elevation: 1,051 m (3,448 ft)

Population (2011)
  - Total: 9,084
  - Density: 24.13/km^{2} (62.50/sq mi)
- Time zone: UTC−06:00
- Postal code: 30203

Orosi is a district of the Paraíso canton, in the Cartago province of Costa Rica.

== History ==
Orosi is one of the oldest communities in Costa Rica. The village of Orosi was chosen, together with Ujarrás, by the Spanish conquerors to establish their first settlement in Costa Rica due to its water wealth and fertile land. Before the arrival of the Spanish in the sixteenth century, the Orosi Valley was inhabited by the indigenous Huetare, Cabecar and Viceita tribes.

== Geography ==
Orosi has an area of 376.41 km^{2} (145.33 sq mi) and an elevation of 1,051 m (3,448 ft).

It is located about 35 km (22 mi) south of the capital San José. Orosi is situated on the Reventazón River in the Orosi Valley, a deep valley with a humid climate, surrounded by hills and lush vegetation. The cultivation of coffee is the leading industry in the area. Orosi has a population of approximately 4,600 and claims to have the oldest Catholic church still in use in Costa Rica. The church, Iglesia de San Jose de Orosi, was built in 1743 (283 years ago) during the colonial era.

== Demographics ==
Historical population
Census	Pop.	±% p.a.
1883	1,246	—
1892	1,186	−0.55%
1927	1,862	+1.30%
1950	3,350	+2.59%
1963	5,363	+3.69%
1973	5,538	+0.32%
1984	5,705	+0.27%
2000	8,862	+2.79%
2011	9,084	+0.23%
2022	9,340	+0.25%
Source: Instituto Nacional de Estadística y Censos; Centro Centroamericano de Población

For the 2011 census, Orosi had a population of 9,084 inhabitants.

== Transportation ==
=== Road transportation ===
The district is covered by the following road routes:

- National Route 2
- National Route 224
- National Route 405
- National Route 408

== Economy ==
=== Tourism ===
With its rain forests, volcanoes, hills and valleys lined with rows upon rows of coffee plants and sugar cane, the Orosi region offers some of the richest scenery to be found in Costa Rica. But the region is also rich in history and contains a number of monuments to the past, including a colonial capital founded in 1563 and archeological excavations that date back to 1000 B.C. Although this area was one of the first in the country to be settled, it has been one of the last to be developed for tourism.

A few kilometers away, at the southern end of the valley, the road ends and the Tapantí National Park begins. This park covers about 600 km^{2} and forms the northernmost section of a massive collection of nature parks that extends into Panama (the largest of which is the La Amistad International Park). As a result, wildlife abounds. However, access is difficult and largely restricted apart from a few kilometers of easy trails. The abundance of birds makes it a popular place for ornithology studies. Part of the reason for the abundant growth is the heavy rainfall, which ranges up to 7,000mm (275 inches) in the mountains. It is the drinkable water source that supplies much of the metropolitan area. Lake Cachí lies to the northeast.

== Gallery ==
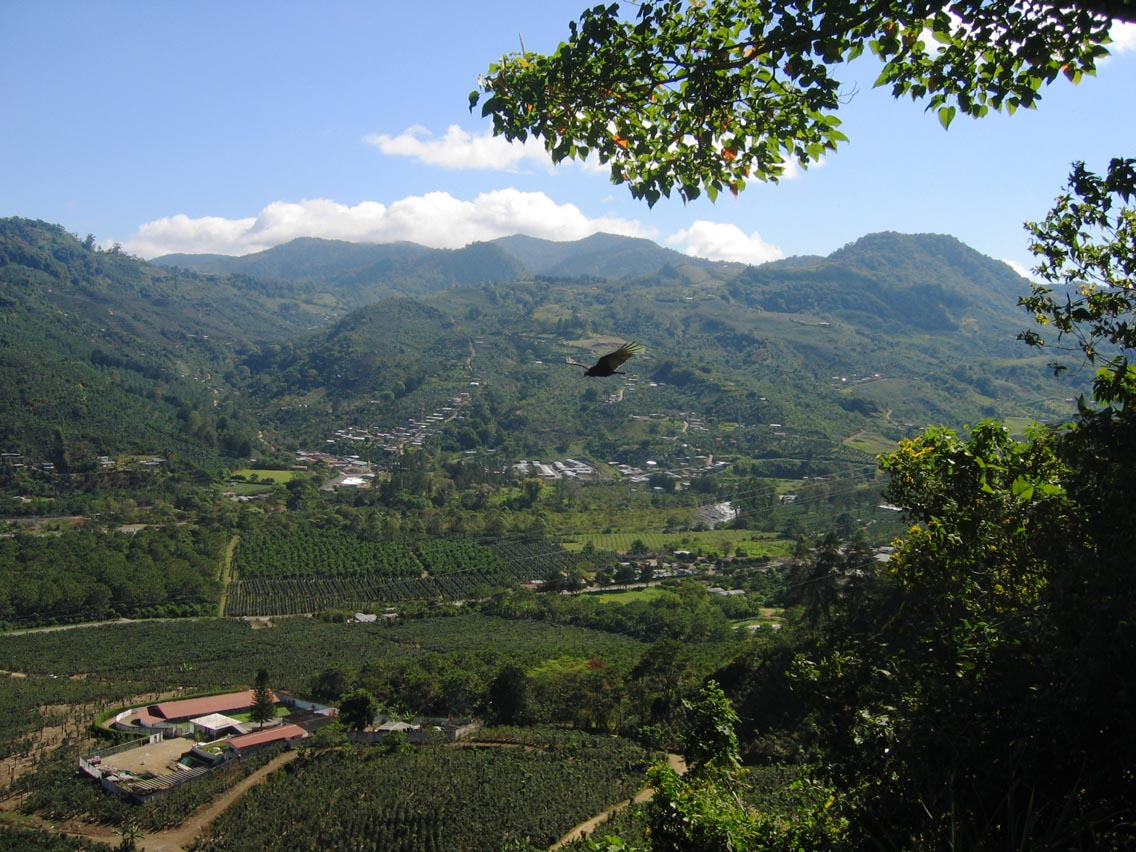
Coffee plantation just south of Orosi

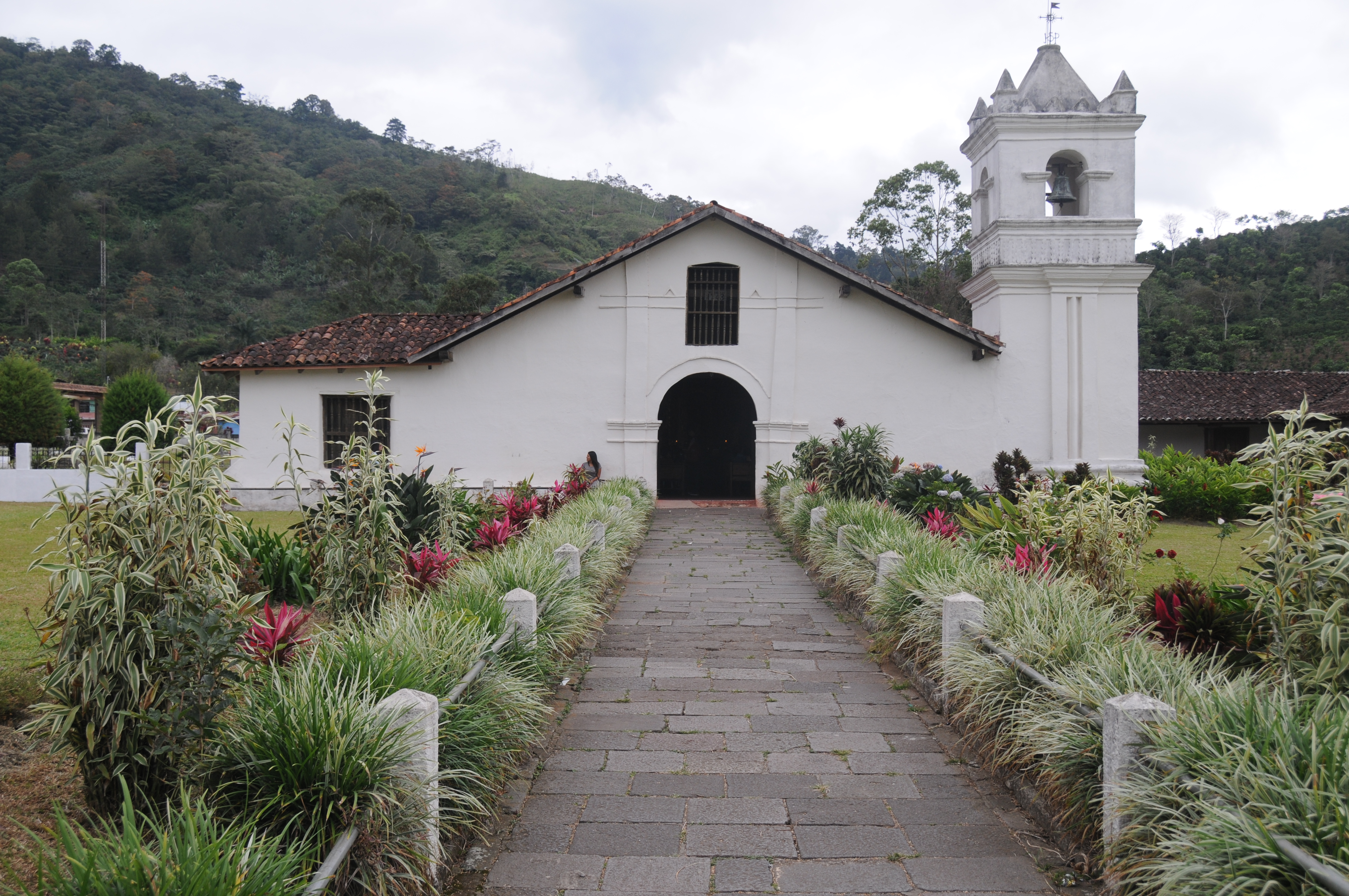
Iglesia de San Jose de Orosi

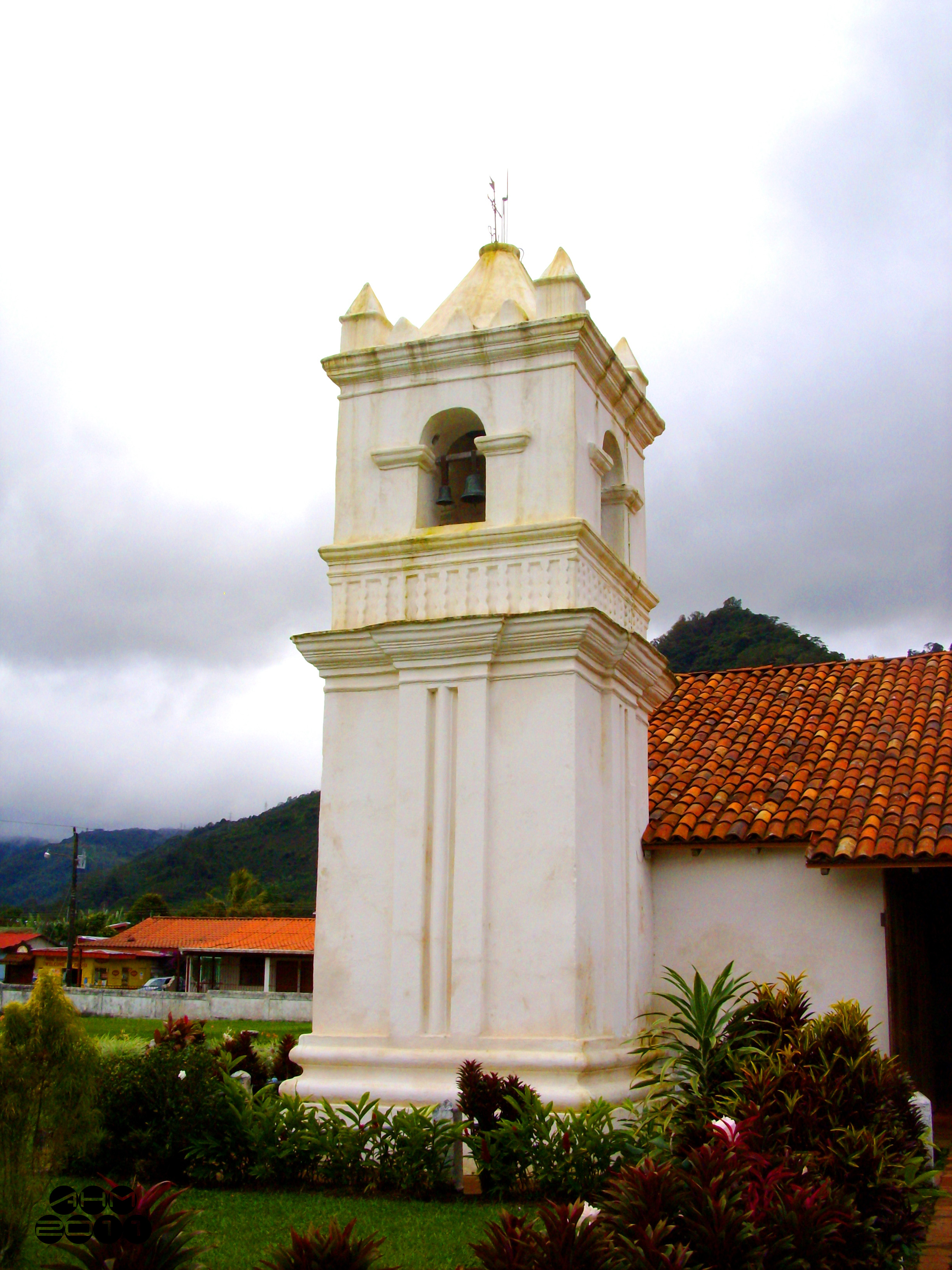
Church tower

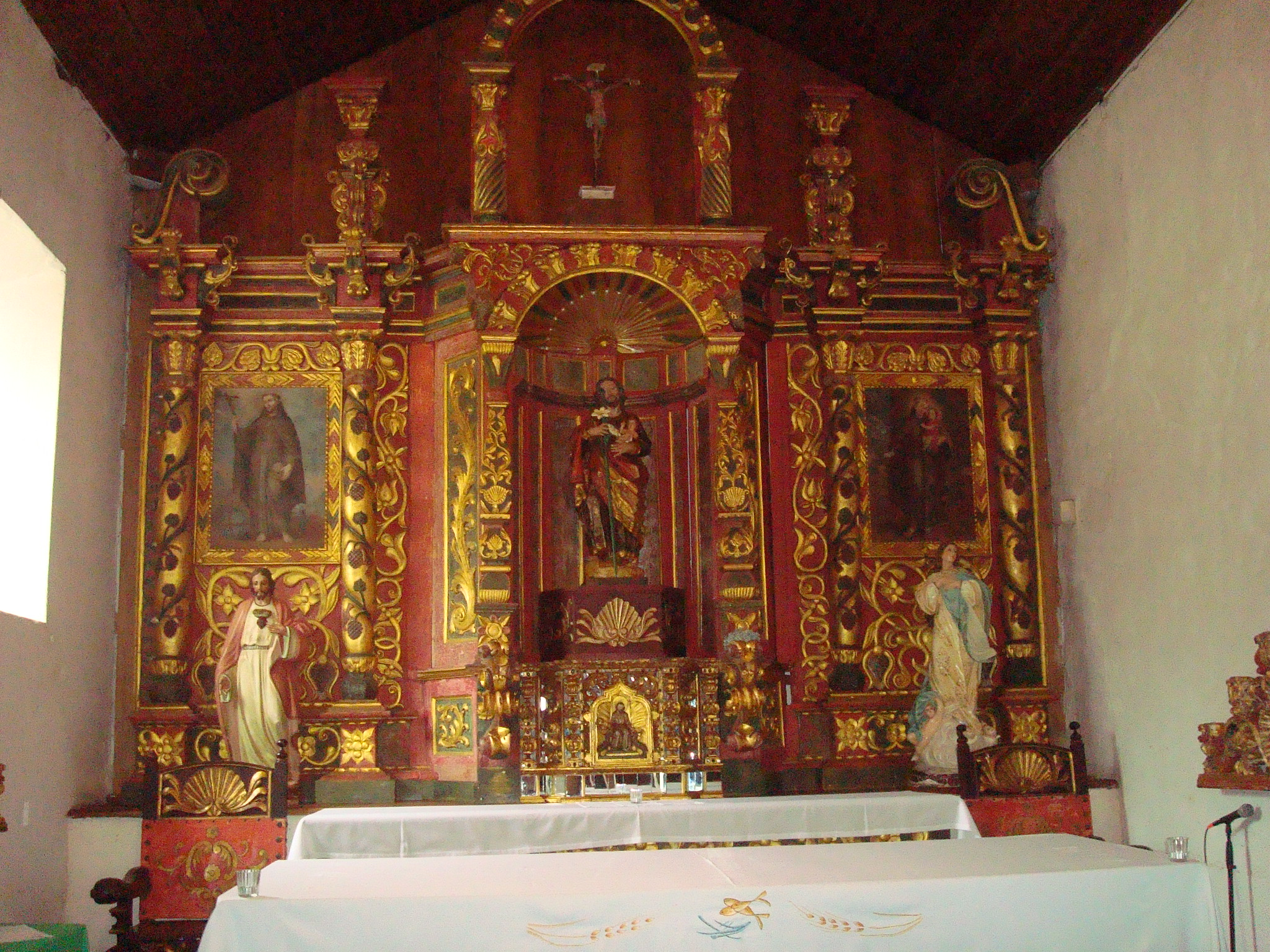
Church altar

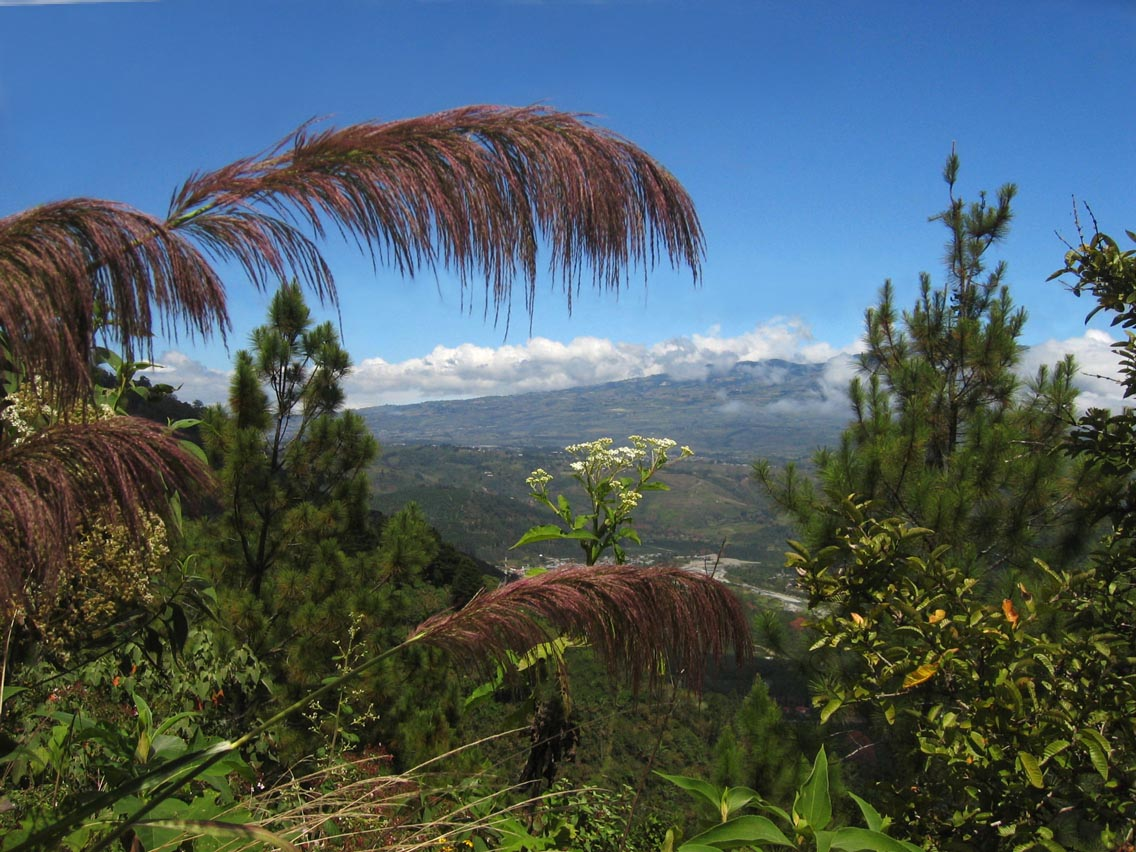
In the hills near Orosi

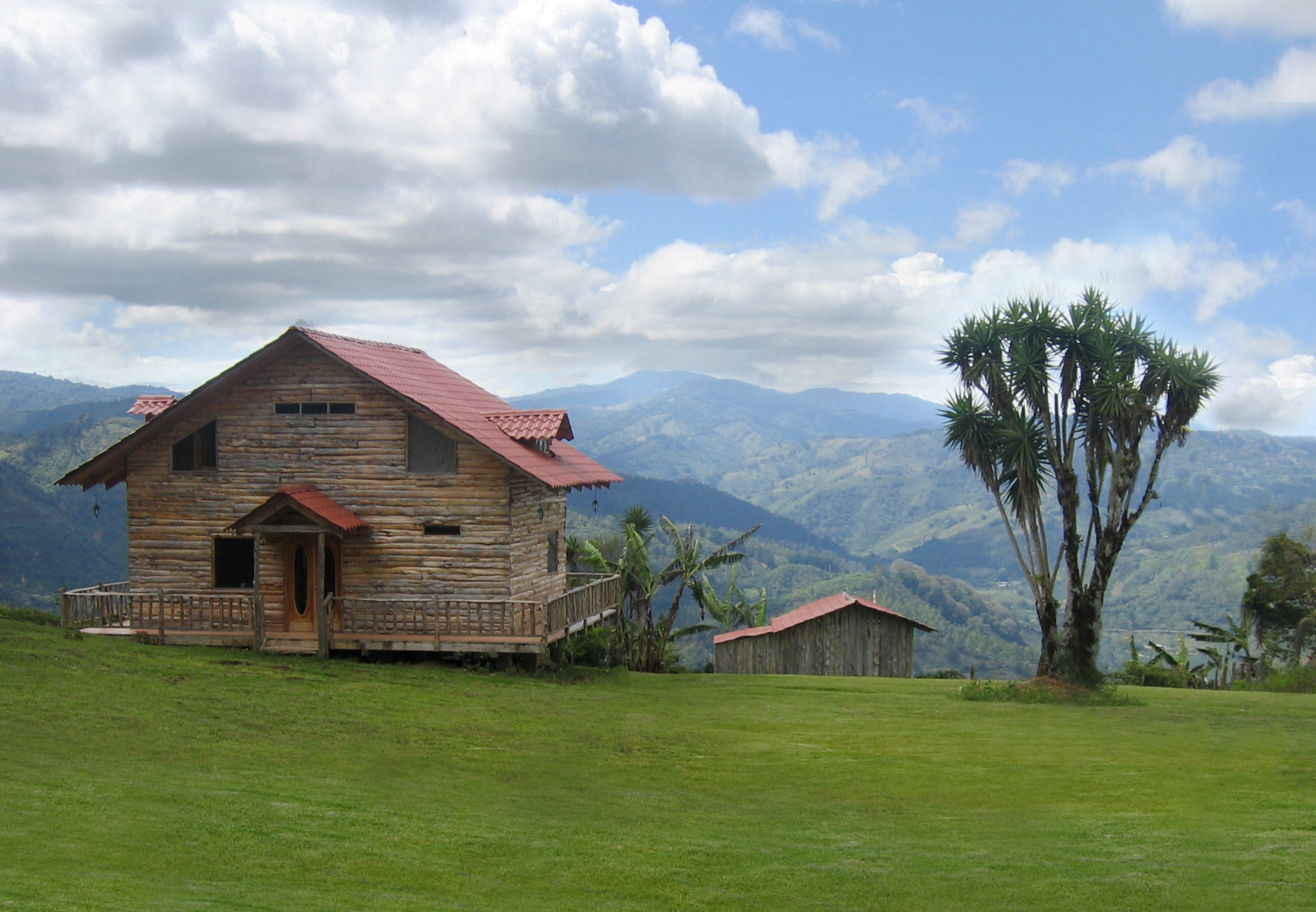
A chalet in the hills, east of Orosí

Puente Palomo which crosses the Rio Grande de Orosí
