= Pejibaye District =

Pejibaye District

- Pejibaye District, Jiménez, Costa Rica
- Pejibaye District, Pérez Zeledón, Costa Rica
