= National Route 224 (Costa Rica) =

National Road Route in Costa Rica

National Secondary Route 224
- Ruta nacional secundaria 224

Route information
- Maintained by Ministry of Public Works and Transport
- Length: 31.580 km (19.623 mi)

Location
- Country: Costa Rica
- Provinces: Cartago

Highway system
- National Road Network of Costa Rica
← Route 223	→ Route 225

National Secondary Route 224, or just Route 224 (Spanish: Ruta Nacional Secundaria 224, or Ruta 224) is a National Road Route of Costa Rica, located in the Cartago province.

== Description ==
In Cartago province the route covers Paraíso canton (Paraíso, Santiago, Orosi, Cachí, and Birrisito districts).

== History ==
On 25 August 2020, the bridge across the dam of Lake Cachí, showed signs of structural instability, with a crack and swing motion when joining the road on the west end (9.840292°N 83.804992°W), after which it was closed.
