= Birrisito =

District in Paraíso canton, Cartago province, Costa Rica

- District
- Interactive map of Birrisito
- Birrisito district location in Costa Rica
- Coordinates: 9.8488°N 83.846°W
- Country: Costa Rica
- Province: Cartago
- Canton: Paraíso
- Founded: 18 August 2021

Area
  - Total: 7.5 km^{2} (2.9 sq mi)
- Elevation: 1,325 m (4,347 ft)
- Time zone: UTC−06:00
- Postal code: 30206

Birrisito is a district of the Paraíso canton, in the Cartago province of Costa Rica.

== History ==
The district was proposed on 13 July 2020 by the deputy Paola Valladares (PLN-Cartago) under the file 22076 of the Legislative Assembly, which was approved in a second debate on 12 July 2021 and eventually created under Law No.° 10004, signed on 28 July 2021 and published in La Gaceta No.° 158 of 18 August 2021.

Due to the general elections of 2022, the district would be incorporated until the after that event.

It was segregated from Paraíso, the first district of the canton.

== Geography ==
Birrisito has an area of 7.5 km^{2} and an elevation of 1,325 metres.

It is located 8 km southeast of Cartago.

== Demographics ==
As of the 2011 census, the district hasn't been created and its population was part of Paraíso district.

== Locations ==
- Head town: Birrisito.
- Hamlets: La Huerta, El Alto Jesús de la Misericordia (Alto Birrisito), El Carmen neighborhood, el Chiral.

== Economy ==
=== Agriculture ===
There are crops of tomato, sweet chili, cucumber, beans, corn, vegetables, sweet potatoes, chayote and also coffee.

=== Tourism ===
There is rural tourism potential.

== Transportation ==
=== Road transportation ===
The district is covered by the following road routes:

- National Route 10
- National Route 224
