= Juan Viñas =

District in Jiménez canton, Cartago province, Costa Rica

- District
- Interactive map of Juan Viñas
- Juan Viñas district location in Costa Rica
- Coordinates: 9.902166°N 83.7423297°W
- Country: Costa Rica
- Province: Cartago
- Canton: Jiménez

Area
  - Total: 43.62 km^{2} (16.84 sq mi)
- Elevation: 1,165 m (3,822 ft)

Population (2011)
  - Total: 6,552
  - Density: 150.2/km^{2} (389.0/sq mi)
- Time zone: UTC−06:00
- Postal code: 30401

Juan Viñas is a district of the Jiménez canton, in the Cartago province of Costa Rica.

== Geography ==
Juan Viñas has an area of 43.62 km^{2} (16.84 sq mi) and an elevation of 1,165 metres.

== Demographics ==
Historical population
Census	Pop.	±% p.a.
1883	850	—
1927	3,531	+3.29%
1950	4,192	+0.75%
1963	5,813	+2.55%
1973	6,234	+0.70%
1984	5,543	−1.06%
2000	6,387	+0.89%
2011	6,552	+0.23%
2022	8,433	+2.32%
Source: Instituto Nacional de Estadística y Censos; Centro Centroamericano de Población

For the 2011 census, Juan Viñas had a population of 6,552 inhabitants.

== Transportation ==
=== Road transportation ===
The district is covered by the following road routes:

- National Route 10
- National Route 230

== Economy ==
It is the home of Ingenio Juan Viñas, the main sugar factory of all the Caribbean Basin of Costa Rica.
