= Peperomia vueltasana =

Scientific classification
- Kingdom: Plantae
- Clade: Embryophytes
- Clade: Tracheophytes
- Clade: Angiosperms
- Clade: Magnoliids
- Order: Piperales
- Family: Piperaceae
- Genus: Peperomia
- Species: P. vueltasana

Binomial name
- Peperomia vueltasana Trel.

Species of plant

Peperomia vueltasana is a herb and epiphyte species of Peperomia plant native to Nicaragua to Panama. It primarily grows in wet tropical biomes.

== Etymology ==
vueltasana came from Las Vueltas, in Tucurrique district, Costa Rica.

== Description ==
It is a moderately small, assurgent, glabrous herb. It has a stem (rather slender) of 2 mm rooting from the lower nodes. Leaves are alternate, lanceolate, or oblanceolate that are acute at both ends or somewhat mucronate, the lower end was reduced and bluntly obovate. Some specimens can be found in the Caribbean slope of Costa Rica.
