= National Route 408 (Costa Rica) =

National Road Route in Costa Rica

National Tertiary Route 408
- Ruta nacional terciaria 408

Route information
- Maintained by Ministry of Public Works and Transport
- Length: 28.785 km (17.886 mi)

Location
- Country: Costa Rica
- Provinces: Cartago

Highway system
- National Road Network of Costa Rica
← Route 407	→ Route 409

National Tertiary Route 408, or just Route 408 (Spanish: Ruta Nacional Terciaria 408, or Ruta 408) is a National Road Route of Costa Rica, located in the Cartago province.

== Description ==
In Cartago province the route covers Paraíso canton (Orosi district), Jiménez canton (Pejibaye district).

== History ==
Landslides are common in this route.
