= Llanos de Santa Lucía =

District in Paraíso canton, Cartago province, Costa Rica

- District
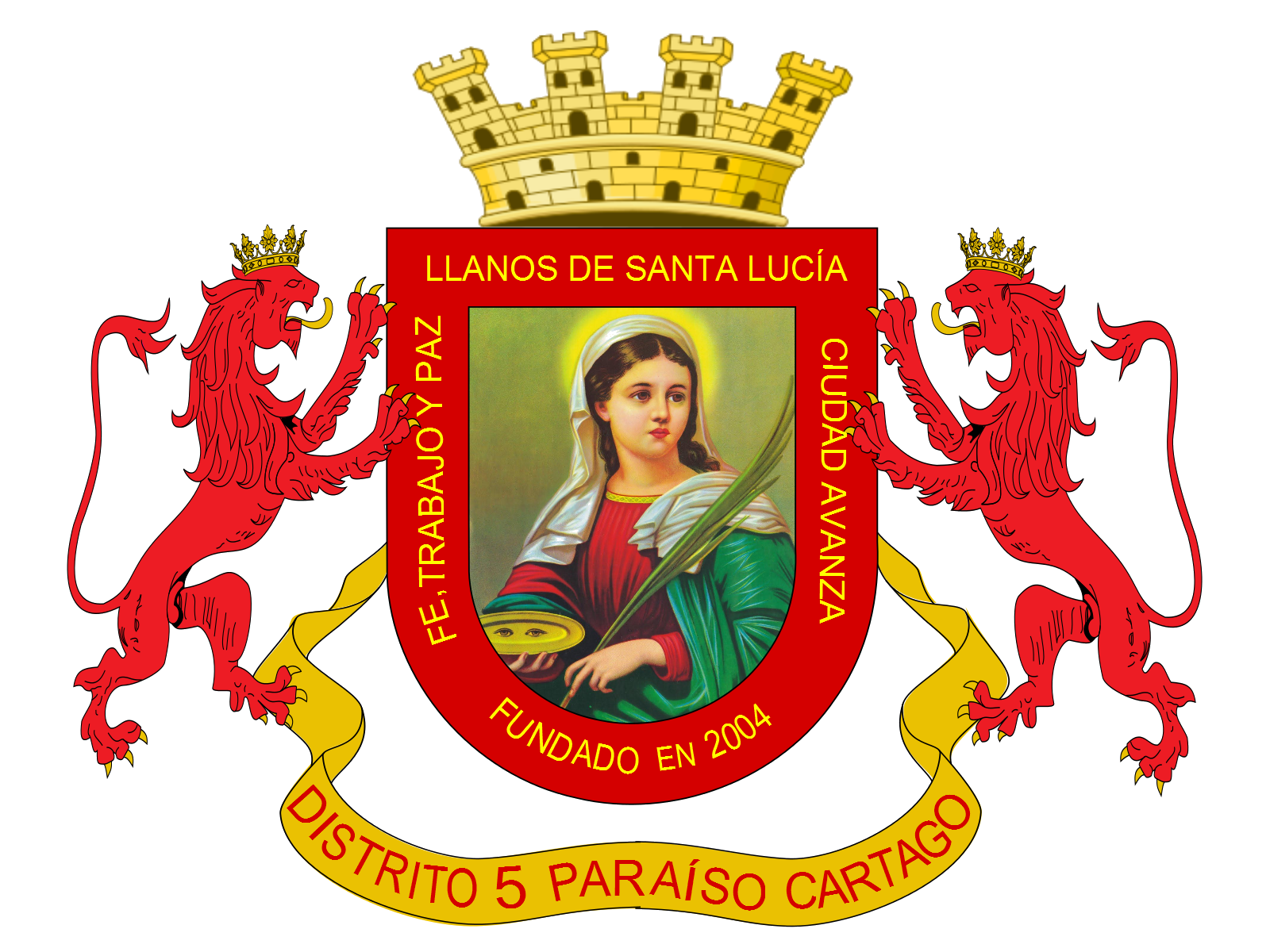
- Flag Coat of arms
- Interactive map of Llanos de Santa Lucía
- Llanos de Santa Lucía district location in Costa Rica
- Coordinates: 9.8481479°N 83.8811829°W
- Country: Costa Rica
- Province: Cartago
- Canton: Paraíso
- Creation: 21 July 2004

Area
  - Total: 6.55 km^{2} (2.53 sq mi)
- Elevation: 1,347 m (4,419 ft)

Population (2011)
  - Total: 17,086
  - Density: 2,610/km^{2} (6,760/sq mi)
- Demonym(s): Santaluceño, ña
- Time zone: UTC−06:00
- Postal code: 30205

Llanos de Santa Lucía formerly known as Santa Lucía is the youngest of the districts of the Paraíso canton, in the Cartago province of Costa Rica. It was established as the fifth district on 21 July 2004.

== History ==
Its main urban area, known as Villa Llanos started as a "precario" in April 1986. It was established as the fifth district of Paraíso by President Abel Pacheco de la Espriella on 21 July 2004, thanks to its quickly population grow and its area of seven square kilometers.

Llanos de Santa Lucía was created on 24 May 2004 by Decreto Ejecutivo 31871-G.

== Geography ==
Llanos de Santa Lucía has an area of 6.55 km^{2} (2.53 sq mi) and an elevation of 1,347 metres.

== Demographics ==
Historical population
Census	Pop.	±% p.a.
2011	17,086	—
2022	17,718	+0.33%
Source: Instituto Nacional de Estadística y Censos; Centro Centroamericano de Población

For the 2011 census, Llanos de Santa Lucía had a population of 17,086 inhabitants.

== Transportation ==
=== Highways ===
- National Route 10, the main east-west route that connects San José with downtown Cartago, Turrialba and Limón.

=== Rail ===
The Interurbano Line operated by Incofer goes through this district. It is being reconstructed as of 2020 and passenger rail service will be provided in the future. The main passenger rail station is located near the Estadio Municipal Quincho Barquero in Downtown Llanos de Santa Lucía.

=== Public transportation ===
Public transit is provided by COOPEPAR RL. It consists entirely of buses serving the Llanos de Santa Lucía area and a service to Downtown Cartago.
