= Santiago District, Paraíso =

District in Paraíso canton, Cartago province, Costa Rica

Santiago
- District
- Santiago district
- Santiago district location in Costa Rica
- Coordinates: 9.8696155°N 83.8059624°W
- Country: Costa Rica
- Province: Cartago
- Canton: Paraíso

Area
  - Total: 25.5 km^{2} (9.8 sq mi)
- Elevation: 1,084 m (3,556 ft)

Population (2011)
  - Total: 5,534
  - Density: 217/km^{2} (562/sq mi)
- Time zone: UTC−06:00
- Postal code: 30202

Santiago is a district of the Paraíso canton, in the Cartago province of Costa Rica.

== Geography ==
Santiago has an area of 25.5 km^{2} and an elevation of 1,084 metres.

== Demographics ==
Historical population
Census	Pop.	±% p.a.
1927	1,300	—
1950	1,873	+1.60%
1963	2,402	+1.93%
1973	2,854	+1.74%
1984	3,303	+1.34%
2000	4,960	+2.57%
2011	5,534	+1.00%
2022	6,682	+1.73%
Source: Instituto Nacional de Estadística y Censos; Centro Centroamericano de Población

For the 2011 census, Santiago had a population of 5,534 inhabitants.

== Transportation ==
=== Road transportation ===
The district is covered by the following road routes:

- National Route 10
- National Route 224
- National Route 404
