= National Route 416 (Costa Rica) =

National Road Route in Costa Rica

National Tertiary Route 416
- Ruta nacional terciaria 416

Route information
- Maintained by Ministry of Public Works and Transport
- Length: 1.225 km (0.761 mi)

Location
- Country: Costa Rica
- Provinces: Cartago

Highway system
- National Road Network of Costa Rica
← Route 415	→ Route 417

National Tertiary Route 416, or just Route 416 (Spanish: Ruta Nacional Terciaria 416, or Ruta 416) is a National Road Route of Costa Rica, located in the Cartago province.

== Description ==
In Cartago province the route covers Paraíso canton (Paraíso district).
