= Ujarrás (brand) =

Ujarrás is a Costa Rican brand of jellies and related products. The company was established in January 1962 by Manuel Rodríguez Rojas and is named after the village of Ujarrás. They produce products such as marmalade, blackberry, guava and strawberry jam and products such as fruit paste, crackers and cookies with jam in them, similar to Jammie Dodgers.
