= Cachí, Costa Rica =

District in Paraíso canton, Cartago province, Costa Rica

Cachí
- District
- Interactive map of Cachí
- Cachí district location in Costa Rica
- Coordinates: 9.8343062°N 83.7982794°W
- Country: Costa Rica
- Province: Cartago
- Canton: Paraíso

Area
  - Total: 41.24 km^{2} (15.92 sq mi)
- Elevation: 1,049 m (3,442 ft)

Population (2011)
  - Total: 5,438
  - Density: 131.9/km^{2} (341.5/sq mi)
- Time zone: UTC−06:00
- Postal code: 30204

Cachí is a district of the Paraíso canton, in the Cartago province of Costa Rica.

== Geography ==
Cachí has an area of 41.24 km^{2} and an elevation of 1,049 metres. It lies near the eastern bank of the man-made Lake Cachí, created by the damming of the Reventazon River which before the 1970s flowed past the town. The town is connected to Ujarrás, on the other side the lake.

== Demographics ==
Historical population
Census	Pop.	±% p.a.
1883	404	—
1892	516	+2.76%
1927	1,690	+3.45%
1950	2,190	+1.13%
1963	3,399	+3.44%
1973	3,678	+0.79%
1984	3,935	+0.62%
2000	5,173	+1.72%
2011	5,438	+0.46%
2022	6,906	+2.20%
Source: Instituto Nacional de Estadística y Censos; Centro Centroamericano de Población

For the 2011 census, Cachí had a population of 5,438 inhabitants.

== Transportation ==
=== Road transportation ===
The district is covered by the following road routes:

- National Route 224
- National Route 225

== Landmarks ==
The town lies in an area rich with green coffee plantations, with a sugar mill dated to the early twentieth century. Of note is a wooden house built by Macedonio Quesada, the noted Costa Rican wood carver and sculptor who named the house Casa del Soñador (Dreamer's House), made entirely from coffee branches and bamboo. The main restaurant of note is La Casona del Cafetal Restaurant. Cachí' contains an Evangelical Church called Espiritu de Vida. The town is divided into several neighborhoods including Calle Boza, Pueblo Nuevo, Loaisa, Peñas Blancas, Primavera, and Volio. There are three elementary schools and one high school.
