= Orosí River =

River in Costa Rica

Coordinates: 9.8195196°N 83.835539°W

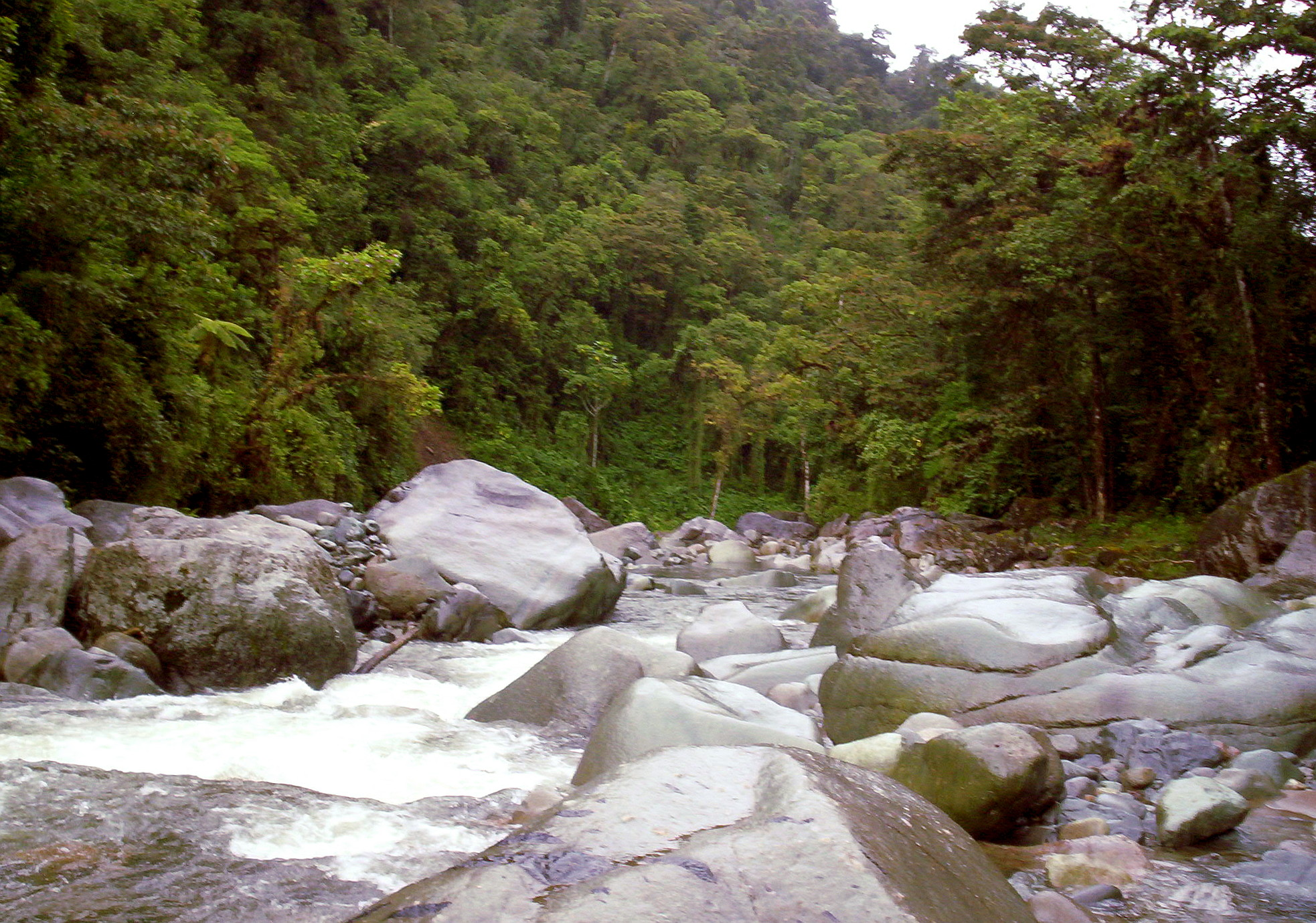
Orosi River at the Tapanti National Park, Costa Rica

The Orosi River (Spanish pronunciation: [oɾoˈsi]), also called Rio Grande de Orosi, is a river in Costa Rica near the Cordillera de Talamanca. The watershed contains one of the rainiest areas of Costa Rica, with annual rainfalls of up to 710 centimetres (280 in).

The river goes through the Tapantí National Park. Just before Lake Cachi (Lago de Cachi), whose dam was constructed in 1954, it links with the Agua Caliente river to form the Reventazón river.
