= Paraíso (canton) =

Canton in Cartago province, Costa Rica

- Canton
- Flag
- Paraíso canton
- Paraíso canton location in Costa Rica
- Coordinates: 9.7294954°N 83.7706033°W
- Country: Costa Rica
- Province: Cartago
- Creation: 7 December 1848
- Head city: Paraíso
- Districts: Districts: Paraíso; Santiago; Orosi; Cachí; Llanos de Santa Lucía

Government
  - Type: Municipality
  - Body: Municipalidad de Paraíso
  - Mayor: Michaell Álvarez Quirós (UP)

Area
  - Total: 476.99 km^{2} (184.17 sq mi)
- Elevation: 1,171 m (3,842 ft)

Population (2011)
  - Total: 57,743
  - Estimate (2022): 65,941
  - Density: 121.06/km^{2} (313.54/sq mi)
- Time zone: UTC−06:00
- Canton code: 302
- Website: https://www.muniparaiso.go.cr/

Paraíso is a canton in the Cartago province of Costa Rica. The head city is in Paraíso district.

== History ==
Paraíso was created on 7 December 1848 by decree 167.

== Geography ==
Paraíso has an area of 476.99 km^{2} (184.17 sq mi) and a mean elevation of 1,171 m (3,842 ft).

Paraíso is an elongated canton that stretches southeast from its head city to encompass a swatch of the Cordillera de Talamanca (Talamanca Mountain Range).

== Government ==
=== Mayor ===
According to Costa Rica's Municipal Code, mayors are elected every four years by the population of the canton. As of the latest municipal elections in 2024, the United We Can candidate, Michaell Álvarez Quirós, was elected mayor of the canton with 41.37% of the votes, with Merlyn Rojas Mora and Roger Ricardo Zúñiga Vega as first and second vice mayors, respectively.

Mayors of Paraíso since the 2002 elections
Period	Name	Party
2002–2006	Marvin Solano Zúñiga	PAPA (Note: Paraíso's Authentic Party (Spanish: Partido Auténtico Paraiseño))
2006–2010	Marvin Solano Zúñiga	PML
2010–2016	Jorge Rodríguez Araya	PUSC
2016–2020	Marvin Solano Zúñiga	PASE
2020–2024	Carlos Manuel Ramírez Sánchez	PLN
2024–2028	Michaell Álvarez Quirós	UP

=== Municipal Council ===
Like the mayor and vice mayors, members of the Municipal Council (called regidores) are elected every four years. Paraíso's Municipal Council has 7 seats for regidores and their substitutes, who can participate in meetings but not vote unless the owning regidor (regidor propietario) is absent. The current president of the Municipal Council is the Progressive Liberal Party member, Aldo Mata Coghi, with National Liberation Party member Silvia Elena Arce Araya as vice president. The Municipal Council's composition for the 2024–2028 period is as follows:

Current composition of the Municipal Council of Paraíso after the 2024 municipal elections
Political parties in the Municipal Council of Paraíso
Political party	Regidores		
Political party	№	Owner	Substitute
United We Can (UP)	3	Kattia Alfaro Saenz	María Gabriela Solano Marín
United We Can (UP)	3	Jaime Andrés Coto Espinoza	Julio Sánchez Soto
United We Can (UP)	3	Milany Sofía Obando Mora	Ana Catalina Barquero Quesada
National Liberation Party (PLN)	2	Luis Diego Calderón Sánchez	Javier Mauricio Hernández Castillo
National Liberation Party (PLN)	2	Silvia Elena Arce Araya^{(VP)}	Sussana Irene Mata Quesada
Social Christian Unity Party (PUSC)	1	Agustín Enrique Siles Solano	Walter Solano Segura (Note: Also legally named Walter Obando Segura.)
Progressive Liberal Party (PLP)	1	Aldo Mata Coghi^{(P)}	Felipe Alberto Loaiza Araya

== Districts ==
The canton of Paraíso is subdivided into the following districts:

1. Paraíso
2. Santiago
3. Orosi
4. Cachí
5. Llanos de Santa Lucía
6. Birrisito

== Demographics ==
Historical population
Census	Pop.	±% p.a.
1864	4,238	—
1883	7,114	+2.76%
1892	7,819	+1.06%
1927	7,900	+0.03%
1950	11,426	+1.62%
1963	18,389	+3.73%
1973	22,281	+1.94%
1984	27,823	+2.04%
2000	52,393	+4.03%
2011	57,743	+0.89%
2022	65,941	+1.21%
Source: Instituto Nacional de Estadística y Censos; Centro Centroamericano de Población

Paraíso had an estimated 65,941 inhabitants in 2022, up from the 57,743 people at the time of the 2011 census.

In 2022, Paraíso had a Human Development Index of 0.778, ranking it 4th highest in its province.

== Transportation ==
=== Road transportation ===
The canton is covered by the following road routes:

- National Route 2
- National Route 10
- National Route 224
- National Route 225
- National Route 404
- National Route 405
- National Route 408
- National Route 416

=== Rail transportation ===
The Interurbano Line operated by Incofer goes through this canton.
