= National Route 225 (Costa Rica) =

National Road Route in Costa Rica

National Secondary Route 225
- Ruta nacional secundaria 225

Route information
- Maintained by Ministry of Public Works and Transport
- Length: 31.740 km (19.722 mi)

Location
- Country: Costa Rica
- Provinces: Cartago

Highway system
- National Road Network of Costa Rica
← Route 224	→ Route 226

National Secondary Route 225, or just Route 225 (Spanish: Ruta Nacional Secundaria 225, or Ruta 225) is a National Road Route of Costa Rica, located in the Cartago province.

== Description ==
In Cartago province the route covers Paraíso canton (Cachí district), Jiménez canton (Tucurrique and Pejibaye districts), and Turrialba canton (La Suiza district).

== History ==
Landslides are common in this route.
