= Atirro River =

River in Costa Rica

Coordinates: 9°54′53″N 83°41′27″W

Atirro River is a river of Costa Rica.
