= Pejibaye River =

Pejibaye

Location
- Country: Costa Rica

Physical characteristics
- Source
  - location: Talamanca, Costa Rica
- Mouth
  - location: Caribbean Sea
- Basin size: Reventazon
- Discharge
  - average: 300 to 3,000 cu ft/s (8.5 to 85.0 m^{3}/s)

Pejibaye River is a river of Costa Rica.
