= Pejibaye District, Jiménez =

District in Jiménez canton, Cartago province, Costa Rica

Pejivalle
- District
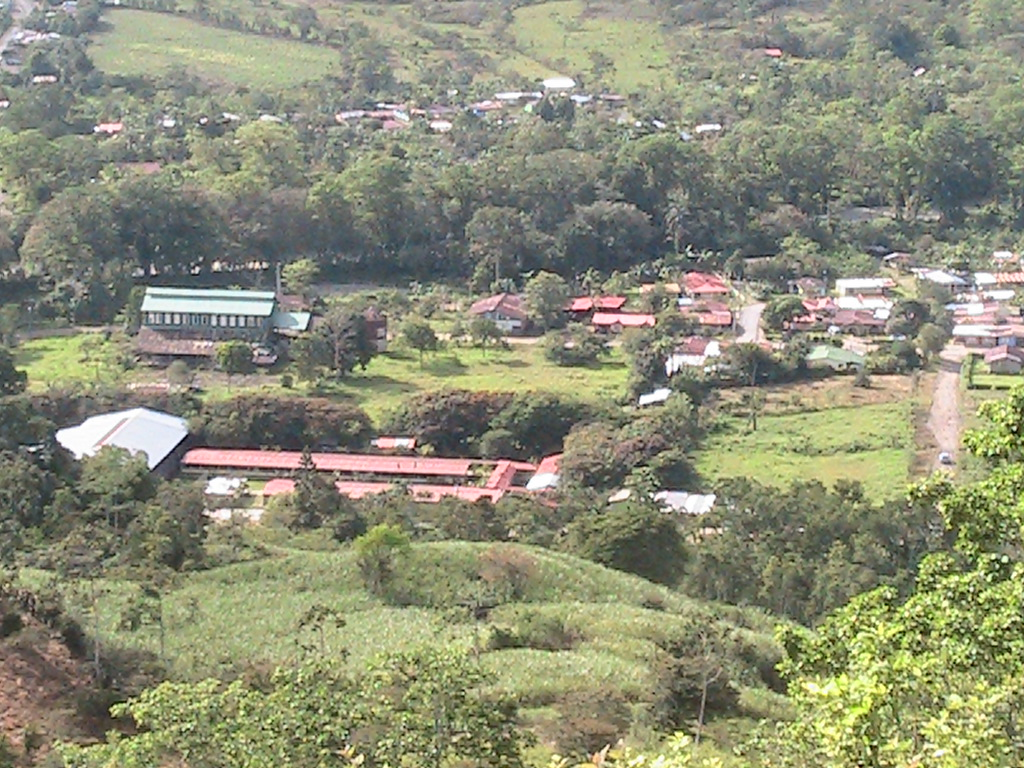
- The town of Pejivalle from the mountains.
- Pejivalle district
- Pejivalle district location in Costa Rica
- Coordinates: 9.773988°N 83.6993734°W
- Country: Costa Rica
- Province: Cartago
- Canton: Jiménez
- Creation: 26 May 1967

Area
  - Total: 173.85 km^{2} (67.12 sq mi)
- Elevation: 643 m (2,110 ft)

Population (2011)
  - Total: 3,245
  - Density: 18.67/km^{2} (48.34/sq mi)
- Time zone: UTC−06:00
- Postal code: 30403

Pejivalle – formerly "Pejibaye" – is a district of the Jiménez canton, in the Cartago province of Costa Rica.

Roughly one hour South of Turrialba and two hours East of Cartago, Pejivalle is an emerging ecotourism site in Costa Rica. The Pejivalle town lies in a valley between the La Marta Wildlife Refuge and the Tapantí National Park.

== History ==
Pejibaye was created on 26 May 1967 by Ley 3887. Segregated from Tucurrique. In 2024, the community changed the spelling of its town to its original spelling of Pejivalle.

== Geography ==
Pejivalle has an area of 173.85 km^{2} and an elevation of 643 metres.

== Demographics ==
Historical population
Census	Pop.	±% p.a.
1973	2,820	—
1984	3,175	+1.08%
2000	3,375	+0.38%
2011	3,245	−0.36%
2022	4,682	+3.39%
Source: Instituto Nacional de Estadística y Censos; Centro Centroamericano de Población

For the 2011 census, Pejivalle had a population of 3,245 inhabitants.

== Settlements ==
Pejivalle, Costa Rica is an ecological community located in the Canton of Jiménez in the Province of Cartago. Pejivalle is separated into many neighborhoods, including El Humo, Plaza Vieja, San Joaquin, Los Tigres, Oriente, El Oso, La Veinte (20), y Veinte Seis (26). Pejivalle is situated about 65 km from San Jose, 42 miles east of Cartago, 25 km south of Turrialba, 15 km south of Tucurrique, and 10 km west of La Suiza. Buses travel four - six times a day to and from Cartago and Turrialba.

== Government ==
The municipal government is seated in Juan Viñas, and oversees Juan Viñas, Tuccurique, and Pejivalle. Recently, a voting referendum to allow Pejivalle to have its own municipal government failed with 1,841 votes against and 1,649 votes in favor (Rodríguez y Brenez, La Nación, 2008).

== Transportation ==
=== Road transportation ===
The district is covered by the following road routes:

- National Route 225
- National Route 408

== Economy ==
=== Agriculture ===
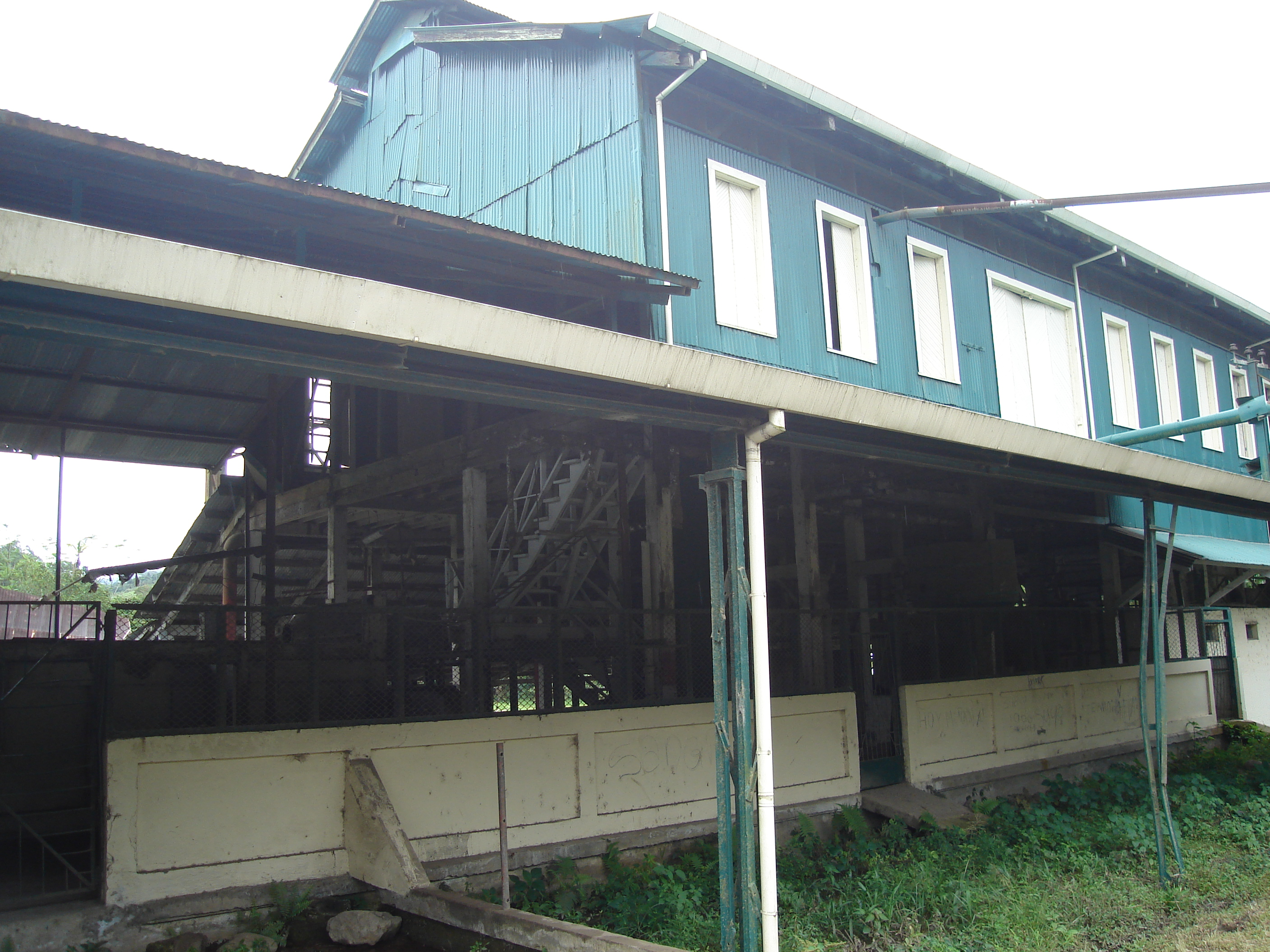
The old benficio de cafe in Pejivalle.

Pejivalle was originally designed as one large farm that was later subdivided by owners Don Jesus and Don Ricardo among the 70 families that worked the land. The agricultural history of the town is indicated in the neighborhood names La Veinte (20) and Veintiseis (26). Plaza Vieja is the oldest neighborhood in Pejivalle formed in the 1940s just after the Costa Rican Civil War. Over the last 70 years, the population of Pejivalle worked in the successful production of coffee and sugar cane. In the last 20 years with the decline in price of both sugar and coffee, Pejivalle has moved away from traditional agricultural production towards greater tourism.

=== Tourism ===
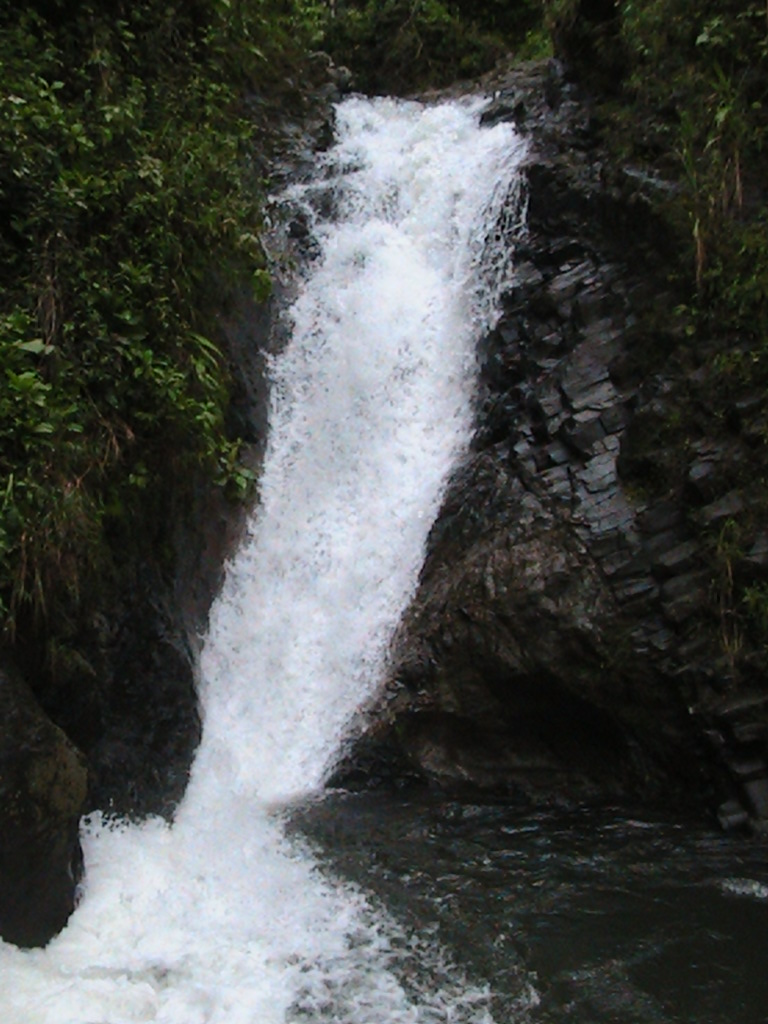
All waterfalls are within hiking distances from the center of town.

Pejivalle has a growing tourist industry. A small group of bed and breakfasts have sprung up to serve local tourists from neighboring towns who regularly come to Pejivalle for rafting on the Pejivalle river. The river itself has class 2 and 3 rapids, and the town has recently been the site of the Costa Rica National Rafting Competition. Nearby, Pacuare river also has class 4 and 5 rafting for more experienced adventure tourists. The surrounding area is home to six different waterfalls, as well as La Marta Wildlife Refuge and Tapantí National Park, which are home to several Costa Rican species of large cats. Regular hiking, bicycle, and horse back riding tours of the cloud forest can be found in Pejivalle as well.

== Education ==
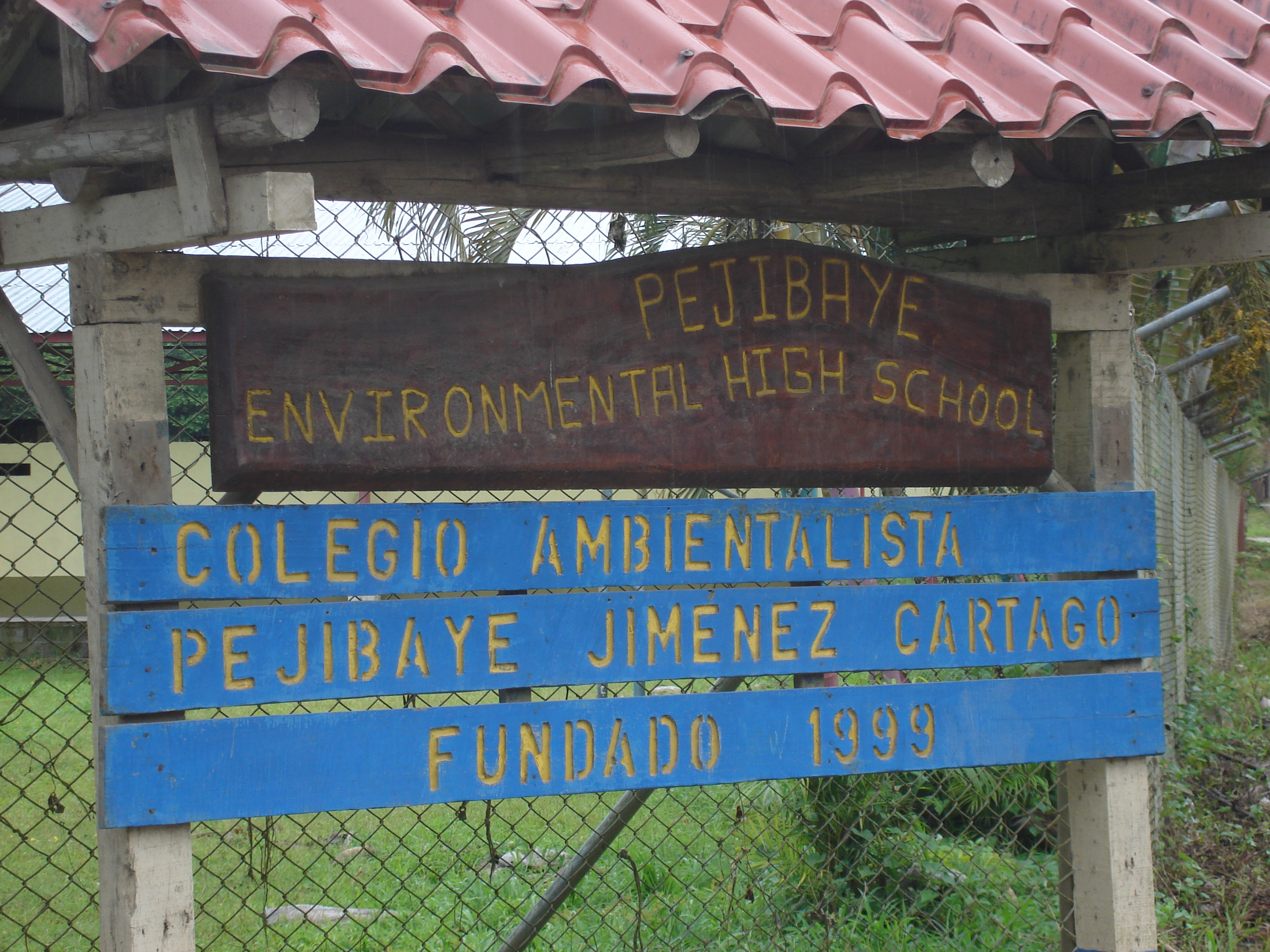
Colegio Ambientalista Pejivalle.

Pejivalle is known for having one of the first Environmental (or Ambiental) High Schools in Costa Rica called Colegio Ambientalista Pejivalle. Newly founded in 1999, this High School has a grand gymnasium, soccer field, air conditioned computer lab, and open air classrooms, with just under 300 students enrolled in grades 7 through 11. Students take classes to learn three languages (English, Spanish, and French) along with the basic core curriculum set forth by the Ministerio de Educación Pública (MEP) of Math, Science, Religion, Social Studies, among others, and a special course in Environmental Studies (also called Ambiental). Nearly 50% of students complete their course work in this High School and go on to study in Universities throughout Costa Rica. In addition to the Environmental High School, there are 3 nearby Grade Schools in El Humo, Plaza Vieja and Pejivalle central with students in grades six and under.
