= Lake Cachí =

Lake Cachi Represa de Cachí
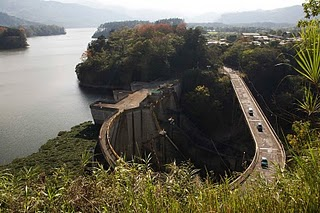
- View of Lake Cachi

- Location within Costa Rica
- Location: Costa Rica
- Coordinates: 9°49′38″N 83°49′0″W
- Type: Artificial reservoir
- Primary inflows: Reventazon River
- Primary outflows: Reventazon River into Atlantic Ocean
- Catchment area: 919 square kilometres (355 sq mi)
- Basin countries: Costa Rica
- Max. length: 70 metres (230 ft)
- Surface area: 324 hectares (800 acres)
- Average depth: 69 metres (226 ft)
- Max. depth: 80 metres (260 ft) to deepest foundation
- Water volume: 51 million cubic metres (41,000 acre⋅ft)
- Surface elevation: 970 metres (3,180 ft)

Lake Cachi (Spanish: Lago de Cachí) is an artificial lake in central Costa Rica created by the Cachí Dam (Represa de Cachí), an arch dam north of Tapantí National Park, to the east-southeast of Cartago in Cartago Province. The main town is Cachí, away from the east bank of the lake. Built in the 1970s, it was one of the first hydroelectric projects in Costa Rica. It has an installed capacity of 102 MW with three units of 34 MW capacity each (Vertical Francis turbines).

The project became operational with the first unit commissioned in 1966, the second unit in 1967, and the third unit in 1978. The Reventazon River provides multiple benefits through the three dams built on it. Out of the three dams, Cachi Dam, not only provides power generation benefits but also controls floods, and offers recreational facilities in the Lake Cachi. The Rio Macho project on the upstream provides hydroelectric power and the downstream Birris power project also provides drinking water (40% of the metropolitan city's water supply needs).

The reservoir, in the Rio Reventazón, is an important supplier of electrical power to Costa Rica. It is operated by Instituto Costarricense de Electricidad (ICE).

== Geography ==
Lake Cachi was born with the creation of the Cachí Dam (represa de Cachí) at the northeastern end of the lake, near the village of Ujarras along the 225 road in the upper basin of the Reventazon River. The dam was created on the Reventazon River as it flows in from the southwest, winding through the steep-sided valley. The river has a total drainage area of 3,000 square kilometres (1,200 sq mi) in an elevation range varying from 3,432 metres (11,260 ft) above mean sea level at its highest point to the lowest outflow point into the Atlantic Ocean; out of this, the reservoir created by the Cachi Dam intercepts the upper catchment area of 919 square kilometres (355 sq mi). The annual precipitation in the entire river basin varies from 1,200 to 8,000 millimetres (47 to 315 in). In 80% of the total catchment area, the relief varies distinctly, with mountains which have slopes between 20 and 85 degrees. The average annual water inflow into the reservoir is at the rate of 104 cubic metres per second (3,700 cu ft/s). The gross storage capacity of the reservoir is 51 million m^{3} (1.8 billion cu ft). The design flood discharge is 3,500 cubic metres per second (120,000 cu ft/s). The reservoir has a surface of 324 hectares (800 acres) which stretches over a length of 6 kilometres (3.7 mi) with maximum water depth of 69 metres (226 ft). Sixty percent of the reservoir's catchment is forested, the remainder is agricultural land. Density currents are formed in the reservoir on account of a combination of temperature gradients and high sediment concentration.

== Cachi arch dam ==
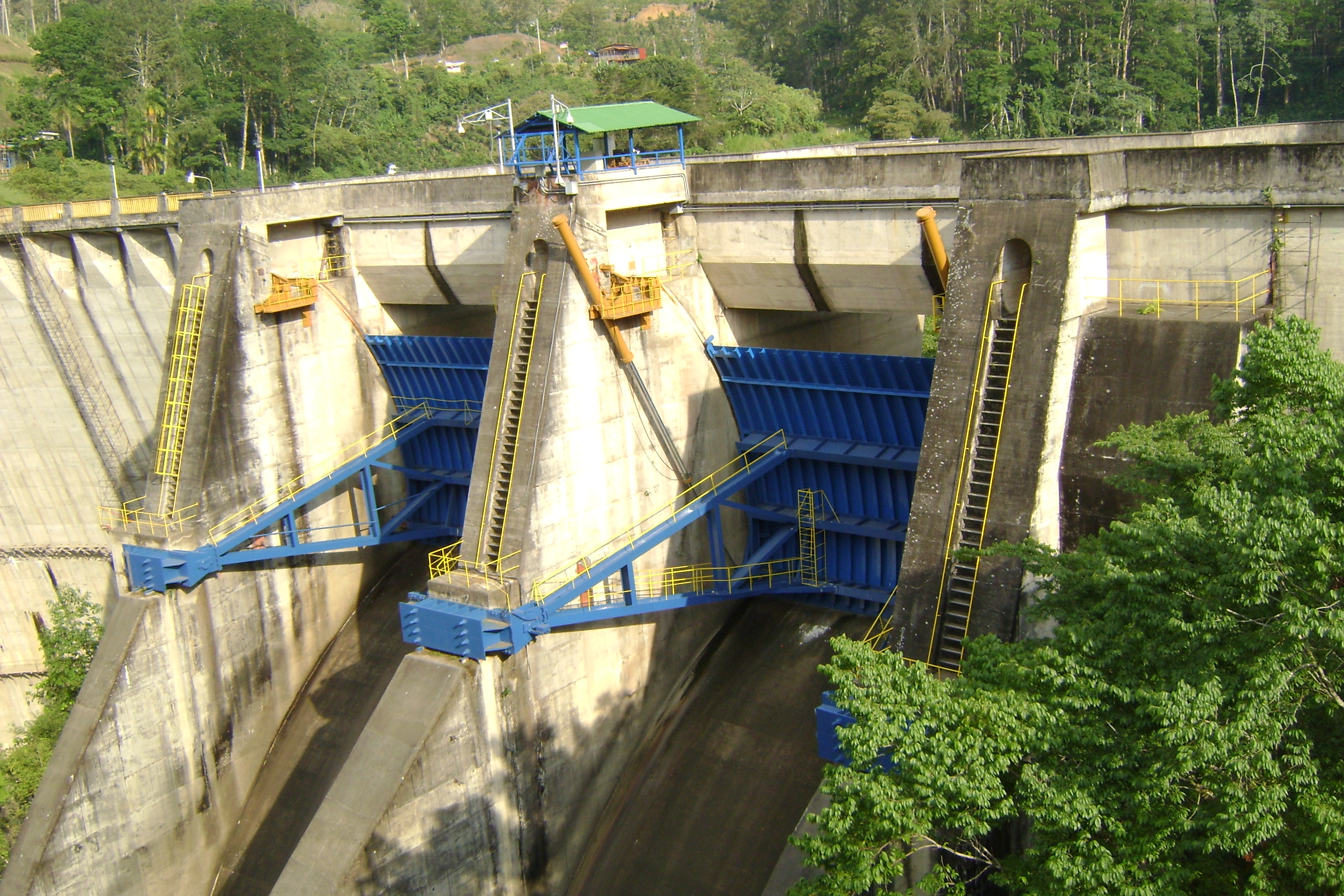

The Cachi dam is a thin double-arch concrete structure (stated to be one of the thinnest such dams in the world)) built to a height of 80 metres (260 ft) above the deepest foundation. It is located in a narrow gorge and has a crest length of 70 metres (230 ft), impounding 51 million cubic metres of inflows of the Reventazon River. During the 1991 Limon earthquake, the dam did not suffer any damage even though the epicentre was 86 kilometres (53 mi) away from the dam. However, there was a temporary suspension of power generation at the powerhouse located 12 kilometres (7.5 mi) away, due to dislocation of the transformers.

The project was planned, designed and executed by ICE, with support for the design of the arch dam, and for supervision of construction provided by Dr. Laginha Serafim, the Portuguese consultants. The construction of the arch dam was undertaken after extensive explorations of the geological features confirmed the suitability of the site. During construction, two diversion tunnels with gated controls, designed for a discharge of 600 cubic metres per second (21,000 cu ft/s) were constructed to divert water away from the work site of the dam foundation.

== Power plant ==
The water from the reservoir is diverted through a 5,942-metre (19,495 ft) long pressure tunnel, a surge tank, a 566-metre (1,857 ft) long penstock including a 116-metre (381 ft) long pressure shaft (steel-lined tunnel) and a power house. The power house has an installation of three units of 34 MW (which would also operate under overload conditions) capacity. They are of vertical type Francis Turbine units which are designed to operate under heads varying between a maximum of 246 metres (807 ft) and a minimum of 221 metres (725 ft). The first two units of the power plant were commissioned in 1966 and 1967, the third in 1978. The project was implemented with soft loan funding provided by the World Bank in two stages after due appraisal.

The output of the hydroelectric power plant at Cachí will increase from 100 megawatts to 160 MW. The expansion of the power plant will include a new 40 MW generator. An existing generator will also be upgraded. The work is scheduled to begin in 2012. The project should be finished by 2015, according to the Costa Rican Electricity Institute (ICE). Once expanded, the Cachí power plant will be able to supply the electricity needs of 330,000 people. The project is being funded by a $140 million loan from the Central American Bank for Economic Integration (CABEI).

Power evacuation from the switch yard of the power station was planned with step-up substation equipped with three-phase step-up transformers and evacuated through double circuit 132 kV transmission lines connecting Cachi with the Rio Macho power plant.

== Sedimentation studies ==
The annual sediment load into the Cachi reservoir estimated at 0.81 million tons, which amounts to 1% storage volume of the reservoir, had been assessed at the planning stage to be distributed at 54% as thalweg deposits (flushed through low level sluice provided in the body of the dam), 21% getting deposited on the terraces, 18% flowing out through the spillway by gate operation and power intake through turbines and 7% trapped as bed load in the reservoir. This process is witnessed in two distinct parts of the reservoir – the upper part and the lower part – the upper part gets filled with sand and coarse sediments and the lower part, which is the deep river channel, gets deposited with fine sediment on its terraces which needs to be flushed by reservoir operation (a high concentration of sediments was noted near the power intake). However, for seven years after the project was commissioned, the reservoir was not desilted, which resulted in trapping of 82% of the sediment inflow into the reservoir and which moved towards the body of the dam and interfered with diversion of flow through the power intake in the body of the dam for power generation. The dam is provided with one scouring sluice at the bottom in the main river channel adjacent to the intake screen of the power intake that draws water for power generation. To keep the reservoir in a serviceable condition to derive planned power benefits, it became obligatory to drain the reservoir to its lowest level (though it caused an inevitable economic loss in power generation during the filling stage every year) and flush the deposited sediments downstream so that the intake does not get choked and allows sediment flow into the turbines. The first flushing operation was carried out in three well defined stages in 1973 and thereafter repeated every year till 1990. The downstream impact on the river regime as a result of the silt flushed from the reservoir was also studied when a peak concentration of 400 grams/litre were noted in the form of turbid water not only on the flood plains but also where the river merged with the Atlantic Sea. It was expected that these deposits would be flushed during the flood season. However, as a result of the silt flushing, some detrimental effect on the biota was noted by local people of the area in the downstream reaches of the river below the dam.

The effectiveness of the flushing operations has been studied over the years by hydrographic surveys of the reservoir using turbidimeters, side scan sonar, sub-bottom profiler, repeated echo sounding, sediment coring and X-ray techniques. The studies have indicated that the sluices provided in the dam to flush the sediment deposits in the reservoir are effective given the "duration and degree to which the reservoir is drawn down and on the discharge capacity of the sluices" and also the shape of the reservoir, which in the case of Cachi is in a narrow gorge. Studies indicated that the average diameter of the sediments deposited in the reservoir was of the order of 0.04 mm. It was also noted that on the terraces of the reservoir flushing was not very effective since they were covered with water hyacinths which had trapped the sediments. The old river channel also had indicated a deposit rate of about 2 metres (6 ft 7 in), which, however, is now regularly flushed out by opening the scouring sluice.

The Cachí reservoir is now flushed of sediment deposits on an almost yearly basis. The field studies on the flushing operation carried out in 1996 indicated that about 250,000 tonnes were deposited within the reach between 10 kilometres (6.2 mi) and 30 kilometres (19 mi) downstream from the dam. Of these, 82% were channel-bed deposits while 18% were deposited on the river banks.

== Recreation ==
The dam takes advantage of the head available in the river, which for some 65 kilometres (40 mi) creates white water suitable for rafting. Surrounded by mountains, the lake was created when the Instituto Costariccense de Electricidad built the dam across the river to supply San José with hydroelectric power.
