= Paraíso, Costa Rica =

District in Paraíso canton, Cartago province, Costa Rica

Paraíso
- District
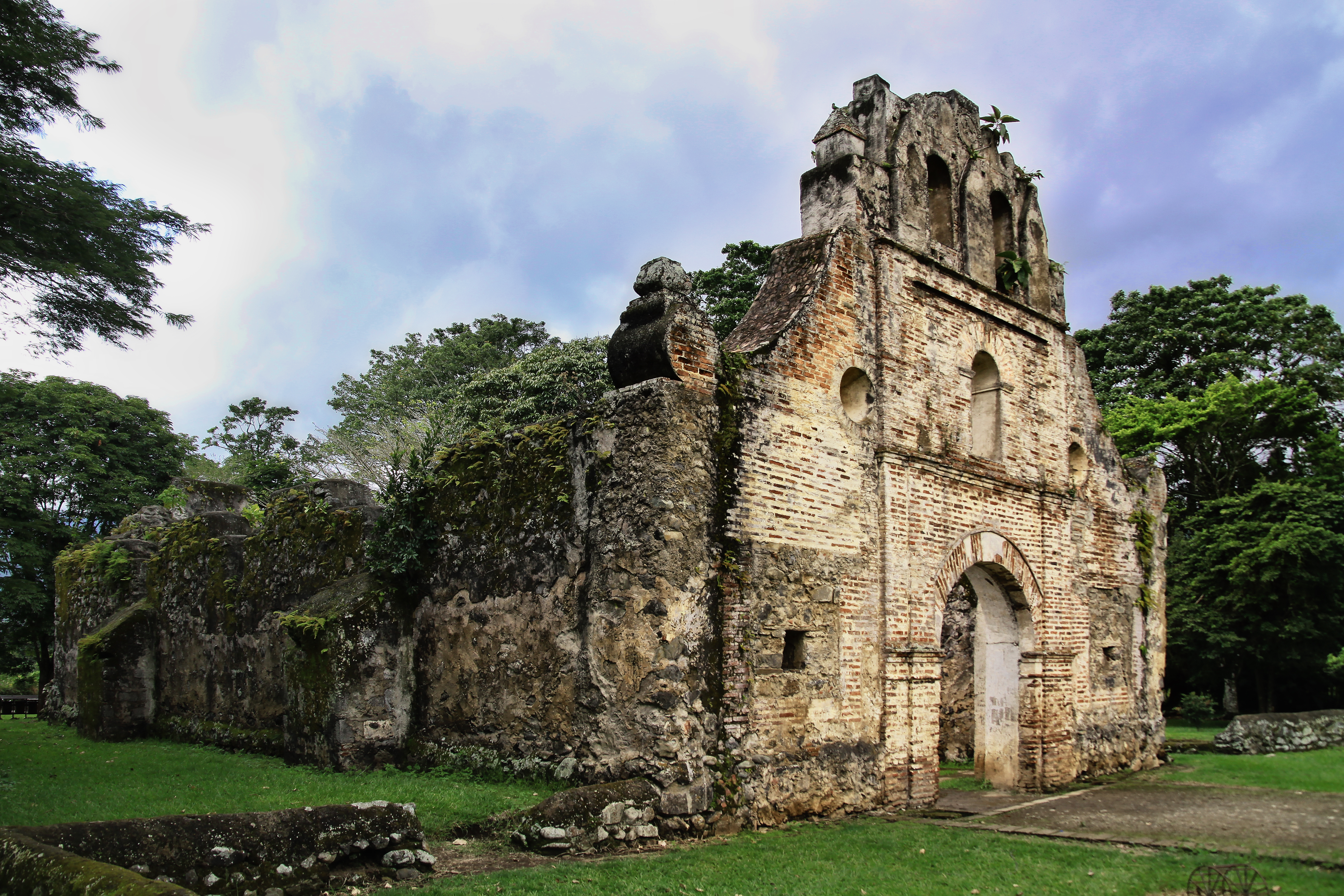
- Ruins of Iglesia de Nuestra Senora de la Limpia Concepcion, built in the 1560s.
- Paraíso district
- Paraíso district location in Costa Rica
- Coordinates: 9°49′56″N 83°50′46″W
- Country: Costa Rica
- Province: Cartago
- Canton: Paraíso
- Founded: 1823

Area
  - Total: 19.5 km^{2} (7.5 sq mi)
- Elevation: 1,325 m (4,347 ft)

Population (2011)
  - Total: 20,601
  - Density: 1,060/km^{2} (2,740/sq mi)
- Time zone: UTC−06:00
- Postal code: 30201
- Climate: Am

Paraíso (Spanish pronunciation: [paɾaˈiso]) is a district of the Paraíso canton, in the Cartago province of Costa Rica.

== History ==
It was established in 1823.

== Geography ==
Paraíso has an area of 19.5 km^{2} (7.5 sq mi) and an elevation of 1,325 metres. It is located 8 km southeast of Cartago.

== Demographics ==
Historical population
Census	Pop.	±% p.a.
1864	1,882	—
1883	1,904	+0.06%
1892	1,899	−0.03%
1927	3,048	+1.36%
1950	4,013	+1.20%
1963	7,225	+4.63%
1973	10,211	+3.52%
1984	14,880	+3.48%
2000	33,398	+5.18%
2011	20,601	−4.30%
2022	25,295	+1.88%
Source: Instituto Nacional de Estadística y Censos; Centro Centroamericano de Población

As of the 2011 census, Paraíso has a population of 20,601 inhabitants.

== Transportation ==
=== Road transportation ===
The district is covered by the following road routes:

- National Route 10
- National Route 224
- National Route 404
- National Route 416

== Points of interest ==
- Farmer's Market in the center of town
- Finca la Flor de Paraiso (a non-profit organic farm)

== Sister cities ==
Paraíso has one sister city:

- Coral Springs, Florida, United States
