= Tanya Preminger =

- טניה פרמינגר
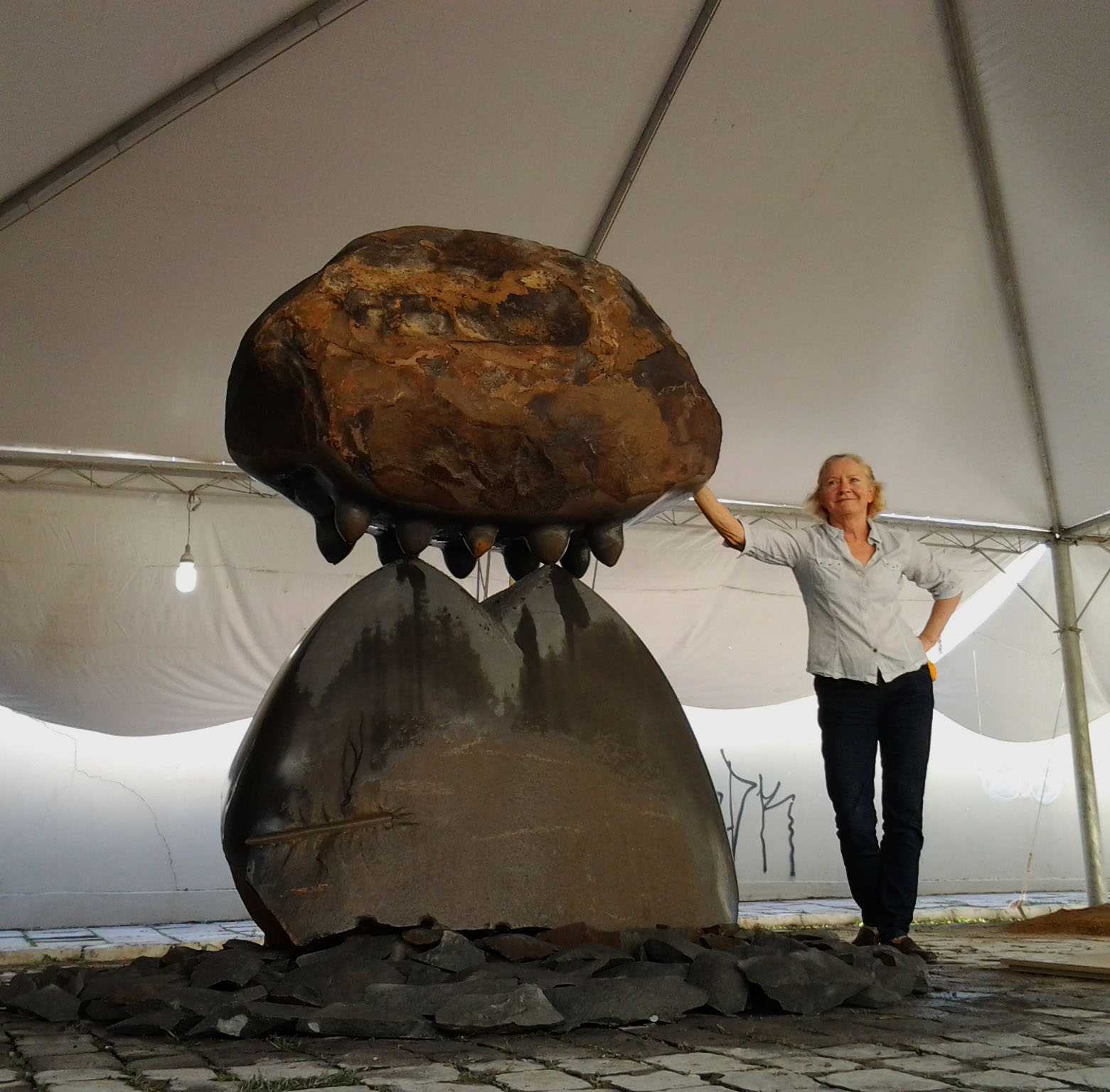
- Born: 12 November 1944 (age 82)
- Education: Master of Arts (M.A.), Surikov Academy of Fine Arts, Moscow
- Occupations: Artist, sculptor
- Known for: Land Art, Ephemeral art, stone sculpture

Tanya Preminger (Hebrew: טניה פרמינגר), is an artist working in various media: environmental art, site-specific art, ephemeral art, sculpture, installation and photography. She is mostly known for her land art projects and large-scale stone sculptures.

Her diverse body of work has been displayed internationally in numerous exhibitions and symposiums.

== Biography ==
Tanya Preminger Novozilova was born in Taganrog, Russia. Her father was Nikolay Novozilov, a scientist and winner of the Lenin award, and her mother was Inna Prochaska, an engineer and a lecturer at the Frunze Military Academy in Moscow.

Tanya earned a Master of Arts (M.A.) degree from the Surikov Academy of Fine Arts, Moscow, Russia.

She married Osip Preminger, and the couple has 4 daughters. Since 1972 she lives, works and teaches in Israel.

Preminger works mainly in natural materials. Her early sculptures were done from clay, wood, and stone, and later she began including earth, grass, water, snow and other materials.

Tanya has presented dozens of solo exhibitions in Israel in various venues, including : The Negev Museum, Open Museum Omer, Ramat Gan Museum, Herzliya Museum of Contemporary Art, Lutshansky Museum, Painters and Sculptors Association Gallery, Tova Osman Gallery, Jerusalem Artists House, and Efrat Gallery.

Preminger has participated in over 240 symposiums, competitions and group exhibitions worldwide.

Her monumental works and environmental projects are installed in more than 38 countries around the world.

In 2008 Preminger founded the “Green Gallery”- an open-air gallery for Land Art in Arsuf Kedem, Israel.

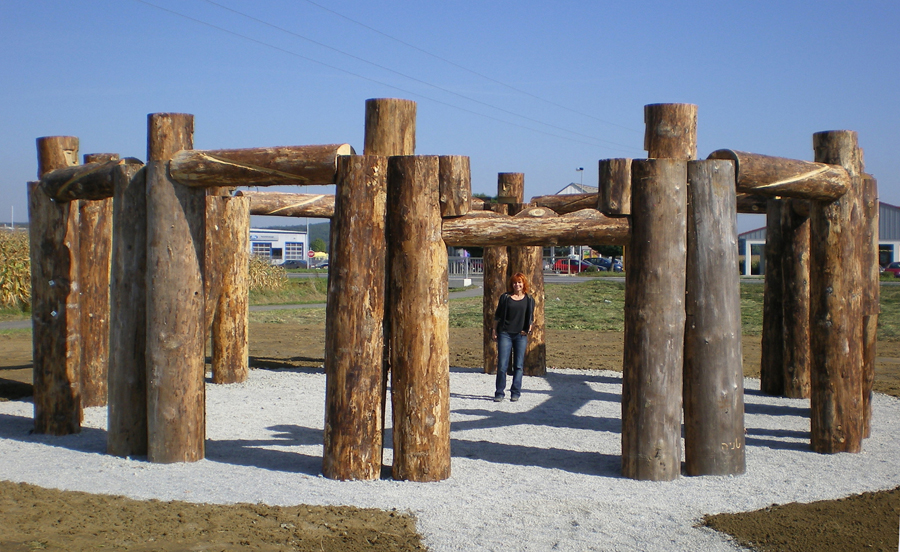
"Woodhenge". 2007. Wood, iron, gravel. Height 320 Diameter 1100 cm. Furstenfeld, Austria.

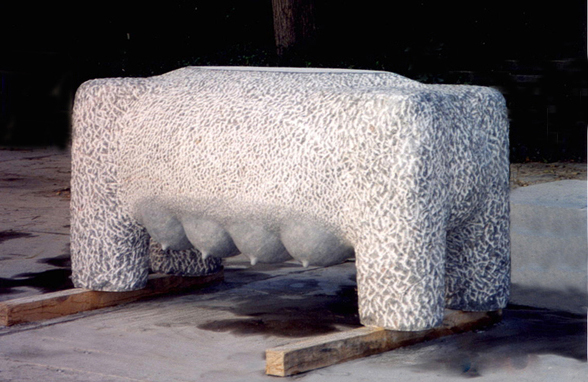
"Mater Nostra". 1998. Marble. 100 x 200 x 100 cm. Anatalya, Turkey.

== Awards ==
| Year | Award | Competition | Country |
|---|---|---|---|
| 2022 | Winner | Arik Einstein Award for Senior Artist | Israel |
| 2019 | Excellence Award | “Spoonbill Cup” Public Art Exhibition | China |
| 2018 | Honorable mention Prize | Arxan Cup International Ice Sculpture | China |
| 2016 | Encouragement Prize | Ministry of Culture and Sport (Israel) | Israel |
| 2014 | Third Place | Sculpture Snow Competition "SculpOLIMP" | Moscow, Russia |
| 2013 | First Place | 2nd International Sculpture Symposium of Mercosul | Bento Gonçalves, Brazil |
| 2013 | Second place | Open competition for snow and ice sculpture "Sculp-OLIMP" | Moscow, Russia |
| 2011 | Third Place | Chinese First International Public Sculpture Contest | China |
| 2011 | Special Selection Award | International Competition for Sea Art Festival | Busan, Korea |
| 2011 | First Place | Stone Sculpture Competition "Forma viva" | Slovenia |
| 2010 | Winner | "Nashe Otechestvo" Competition | Moscow, Russia |
| 2010 | Third place | International Snow Sculpture Competition | Valloire, France |
| 2007 | Second Place | International Sculpture Competition | "La Piera Musa Agreste", Italy |
| 2003 | First Place | Competition for Sculpture work "Mifal Hapais" | Israel |
| 2003 | Excellent Works Selection | International City Sculpture Exhibition | Fuzhou, China |
| 2001 | Sculptors Award | International Stone Sculpture Competition | San-Chung, South Korea |
| 1999 | First Place | International Stone Sculpture Competition | "Nantopietra" Nanto, Italy |
| 1998 | "Con Salud" Prize | International Biennale Sculpture Competition | Resistencia, Argentina |
| 1997 | First Place | International Stone Sculpture Competition | Fanano, Italy |
| 1996 | Third Place | International Stone Sculpture Competition | Caorle, Italy |
| 1995 | Outstanding Prize | International Stone Sculpture Competition | Hualien, Taiwan |

== Grants ==
2013 Grant of “Artist” for Setouchi Trienale, Japan.
2009 Artist Residence grant, Pedvale Open Air Museum, Latvia.
2002 Artist-in-residence grant. University of Houston, Texas, USA.
1991 Artist-in-residence grant. Bemis Center for Contemporary Arts, Omaha, USA.

== Selected works ==
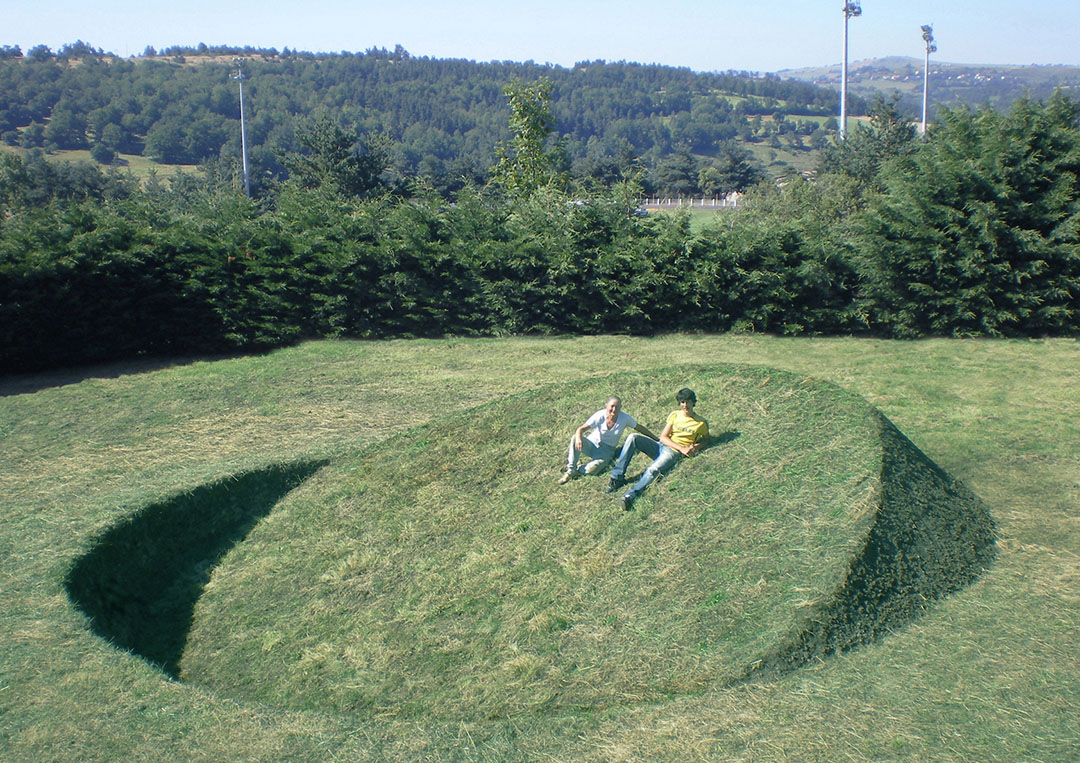
“ROUND BALANCE” 2008 Soil, grass, 260x900x900 cm. Saint-Flour, France.

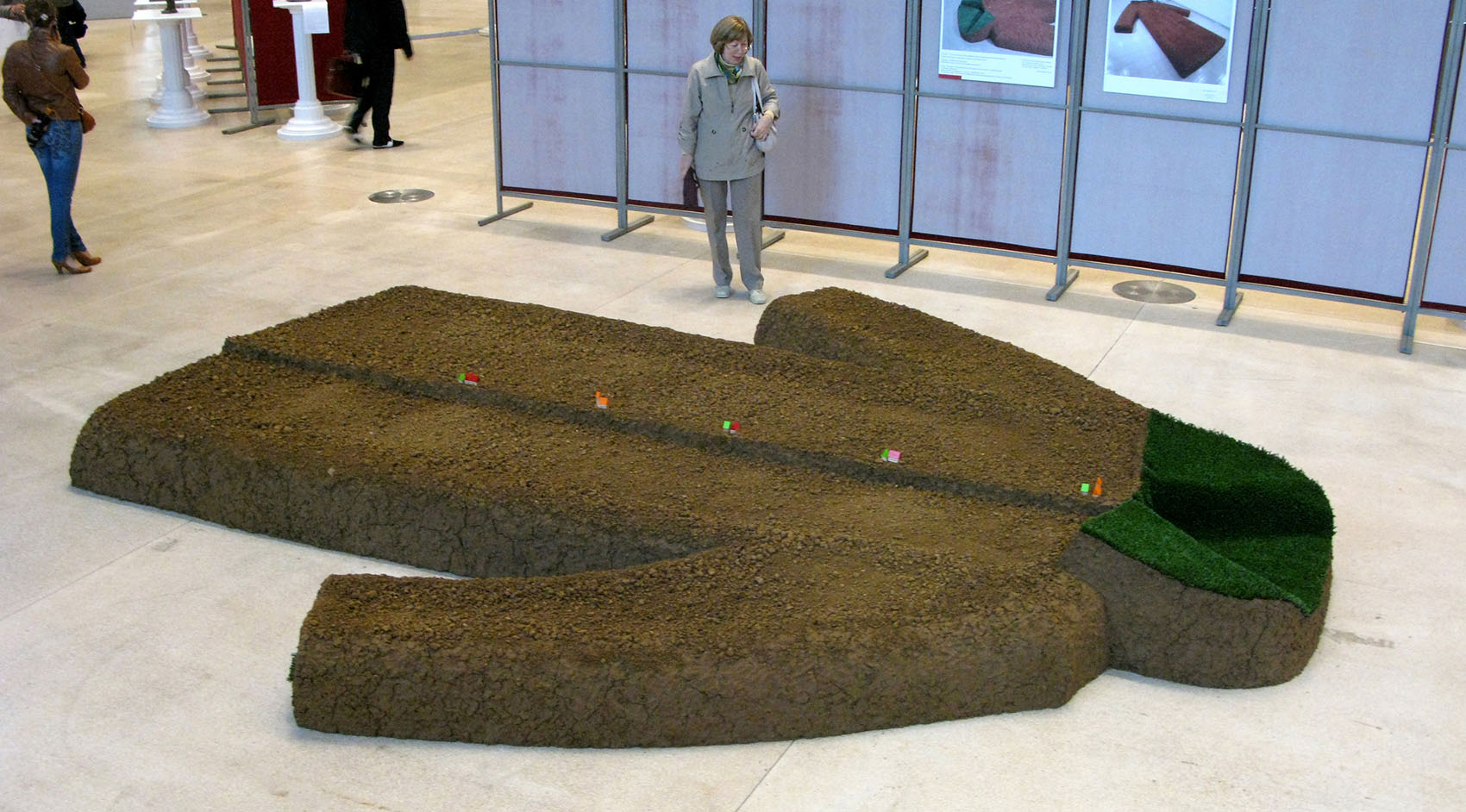
“MOTHERLAND” 2010 Earth, synthetic grass, polystyrene, 45x550x440 cm. Moscow, Russia.

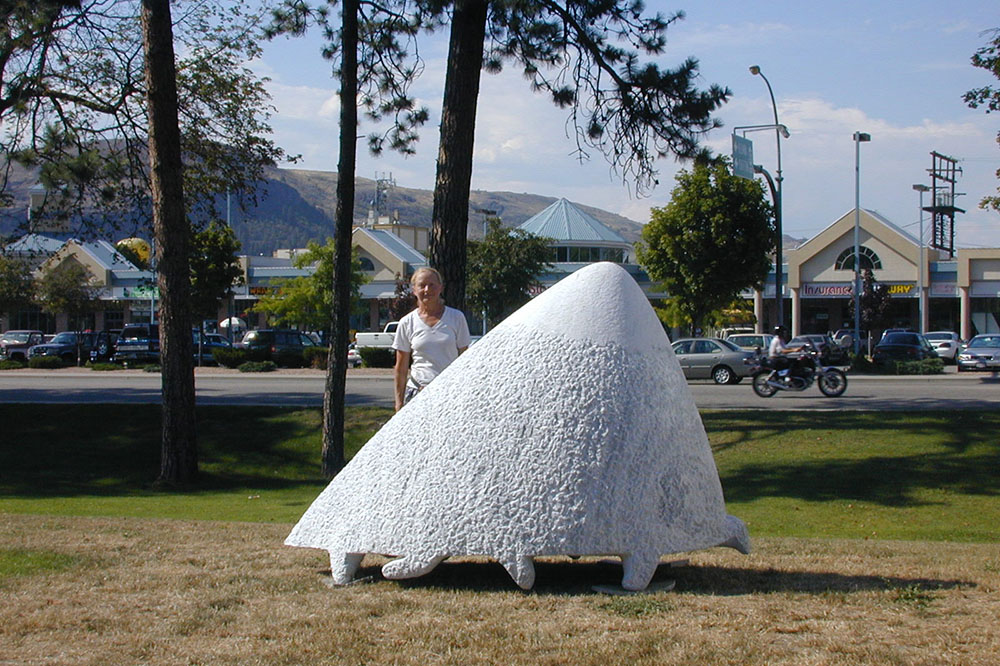
“THE MOUNTAIN IS COMING TO MUHAMED” 2002 Marble, 160x250x110 cm. Vernon, Canada.

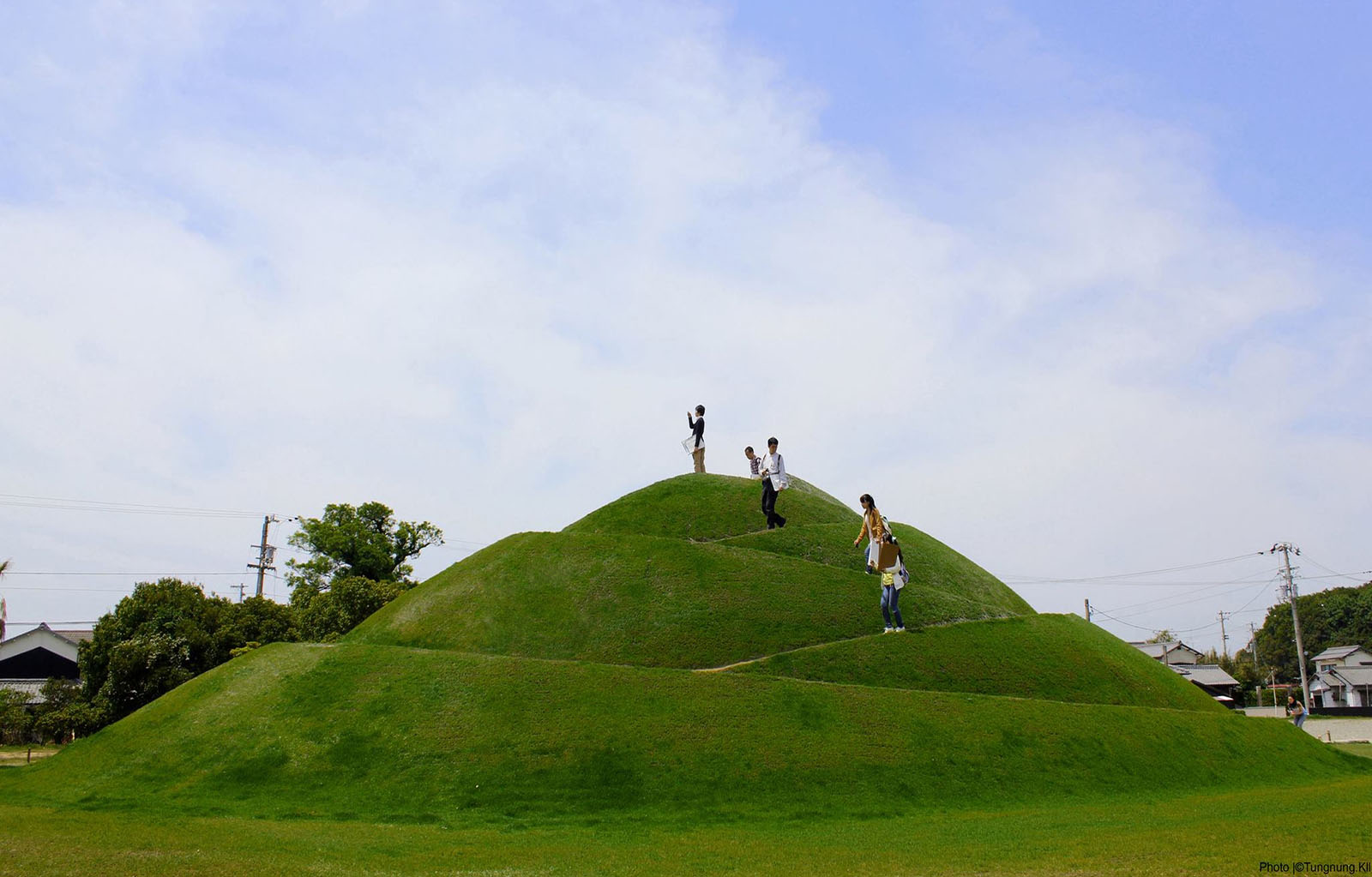
“STRATUM” 2013 Earth, grass, 6.5x28x18 m. Setouchi Triennale, Shamijima, Japan.

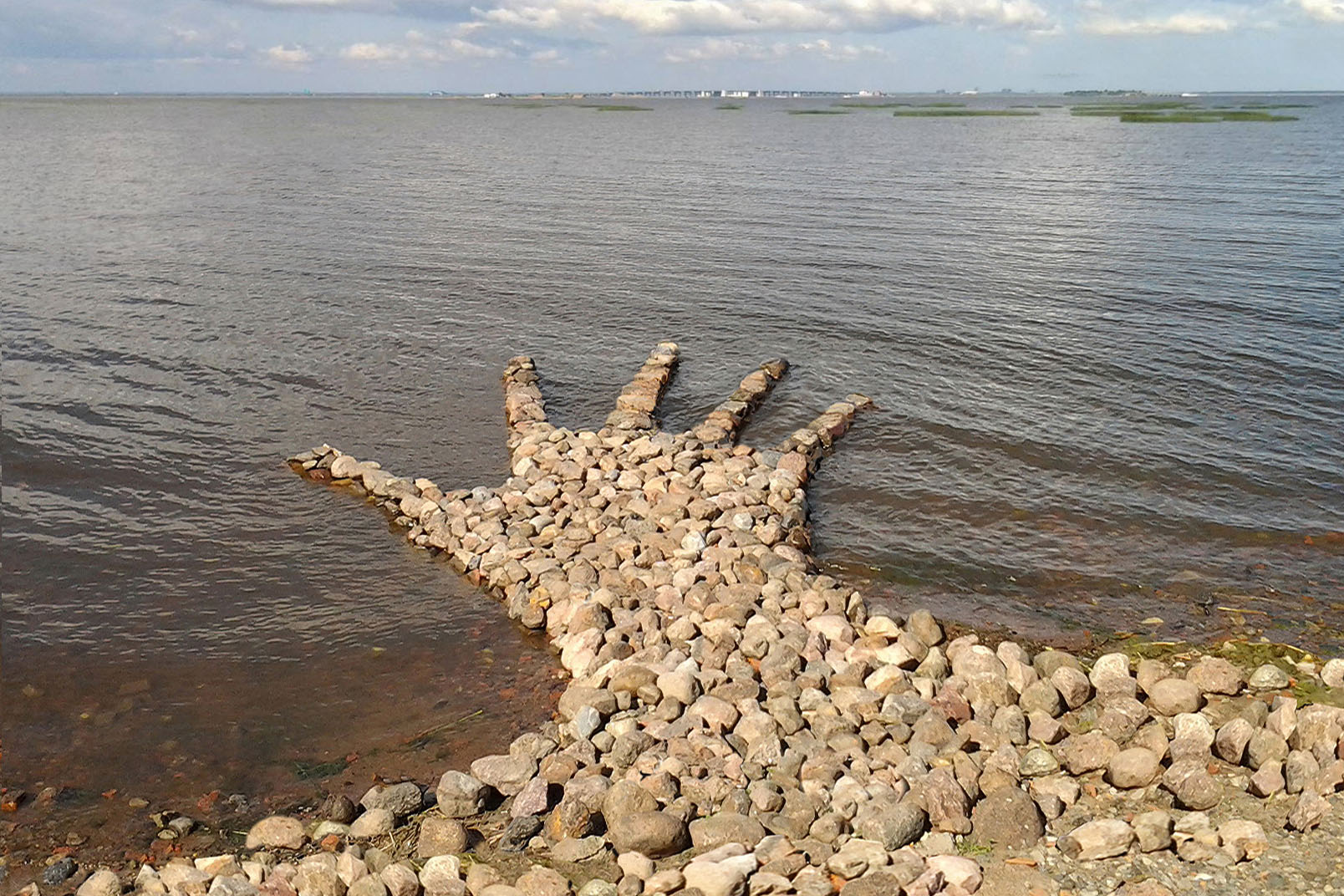
“KRONSHTADT” 2014 stones, granite, 50x580x350 cm. Kronshtadt, Russia.

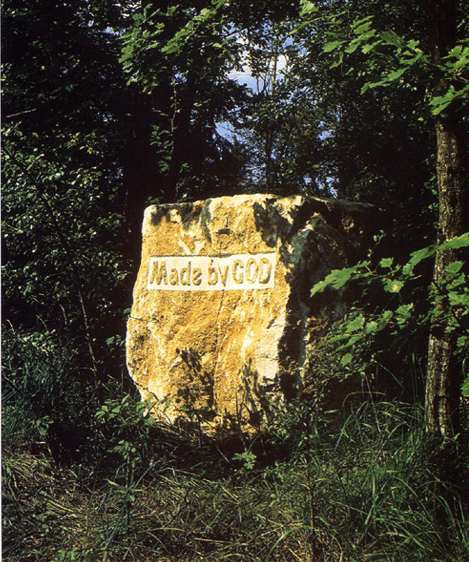
“MADE BY GOD” 1999, stone ,130x120x110 cm. Le Vent des Forest, France.

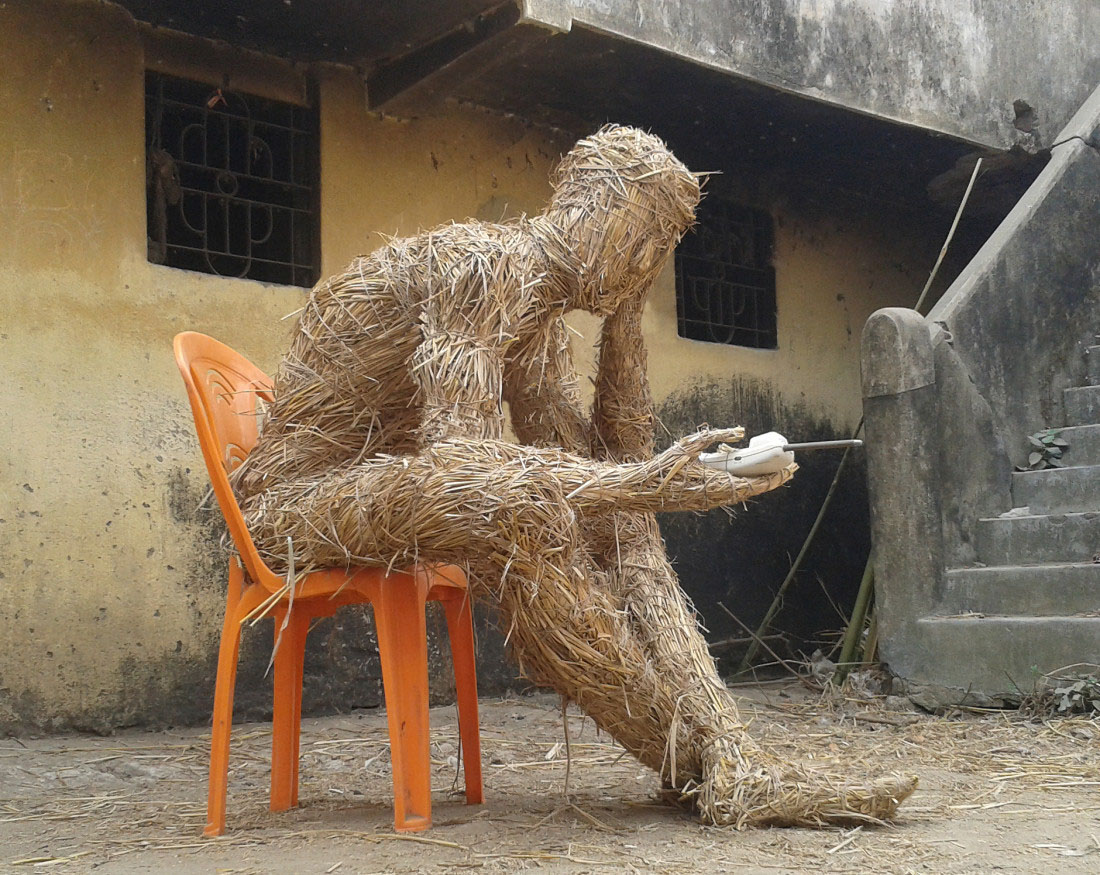
“ECOLOGICAL MAN” 2017 rice straw, bamboo, chair, rope, telephone, 115 x 130 x 80 cm. Komdhara, India.

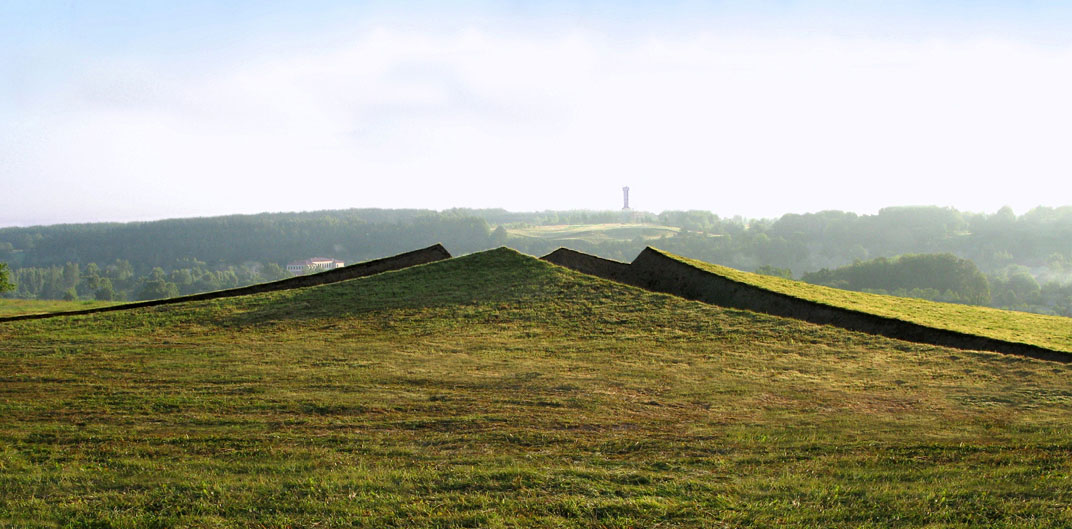
“RITUAL CUT” 2009 Earth, grass 4.5x60x75 m. Pedvale Open-Air Art Museum, Latvia.

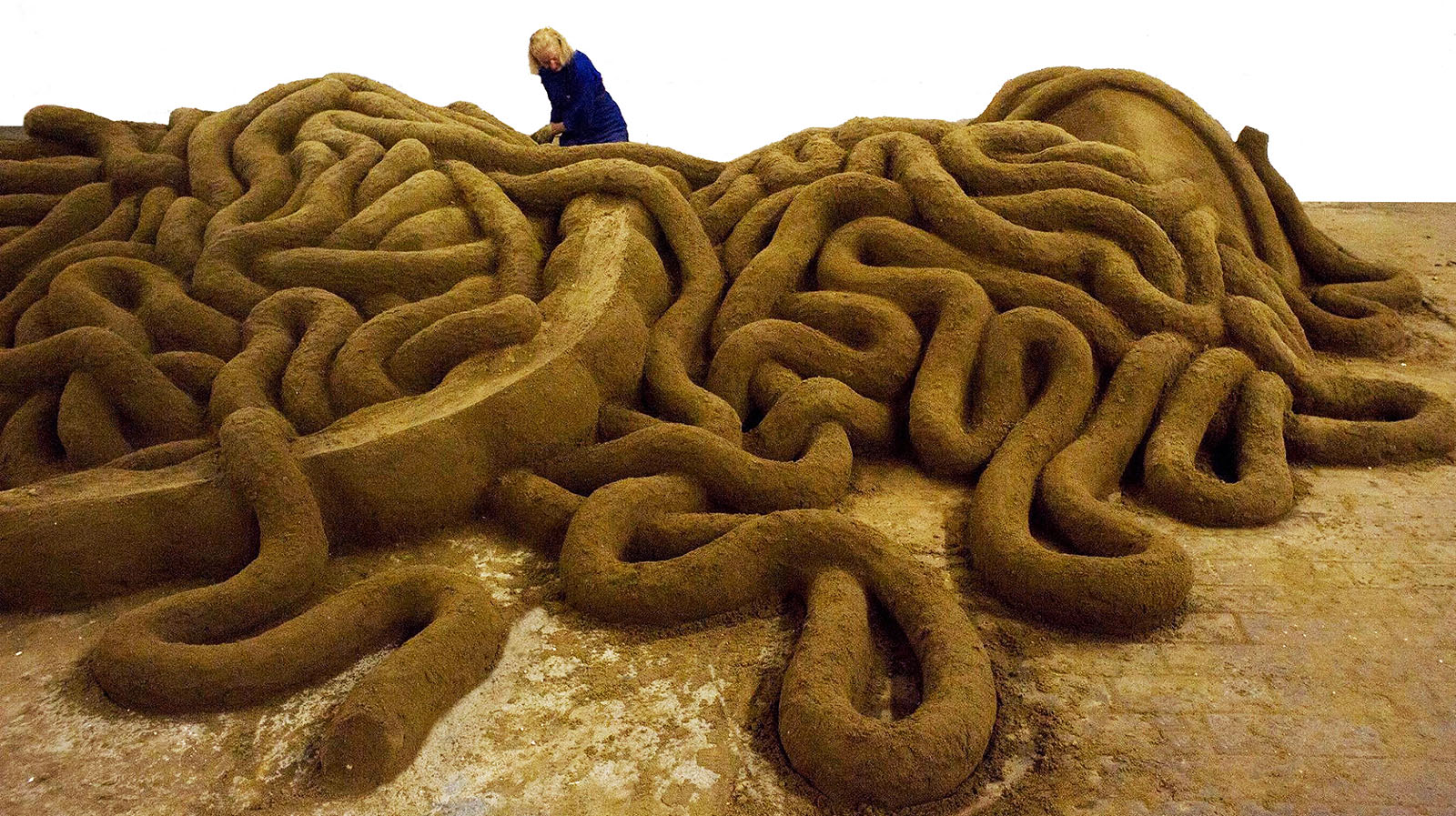
“HARAKIRI” 2015 Installation Earth, Polyurethane, foam, 90x760x550 cm. Moscow Biennale, Russia.

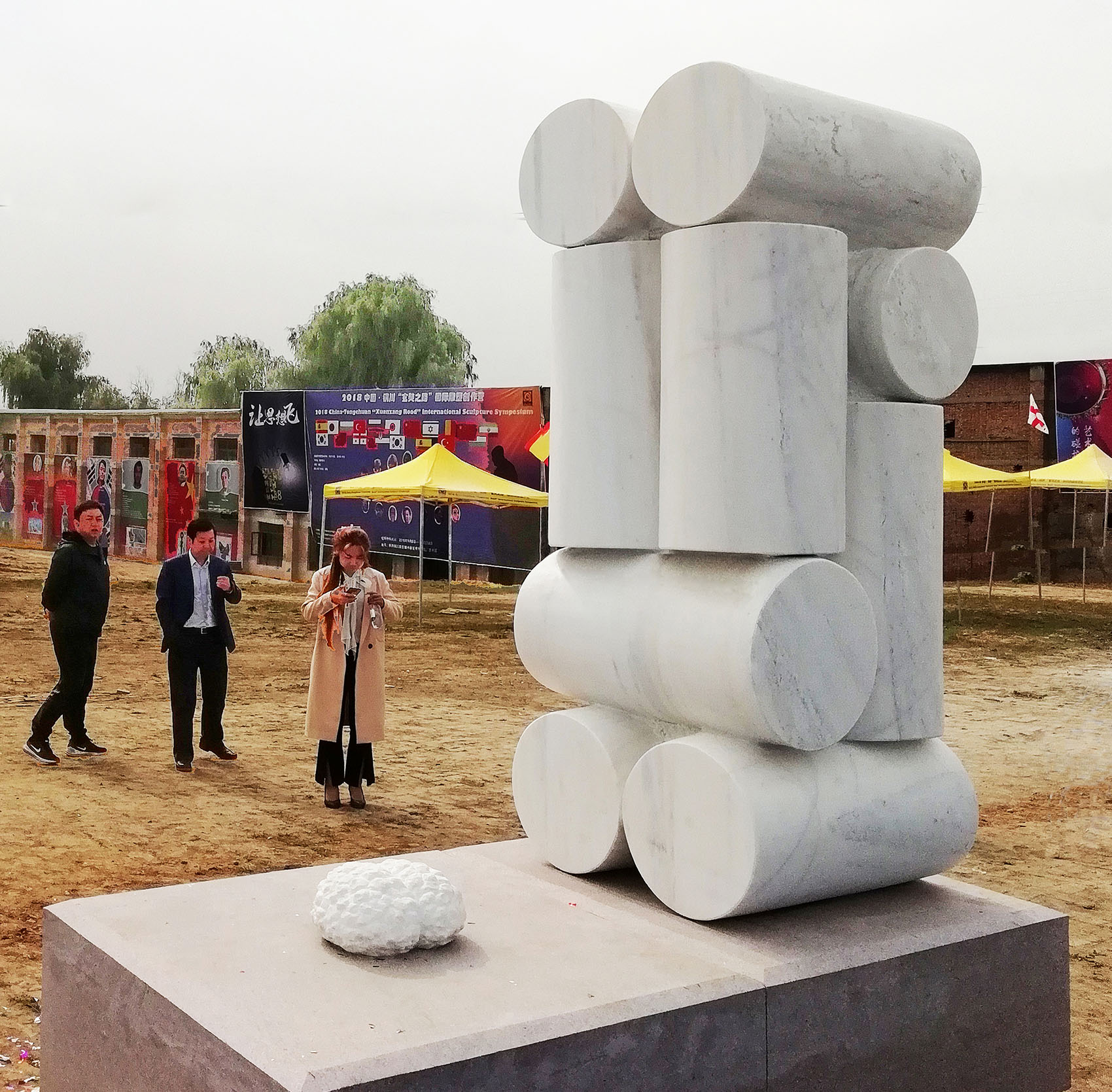
“CONTAINERS” 2018 marble, 220x90x90 cm. 15x30X27 cm. Tongchuan, China.

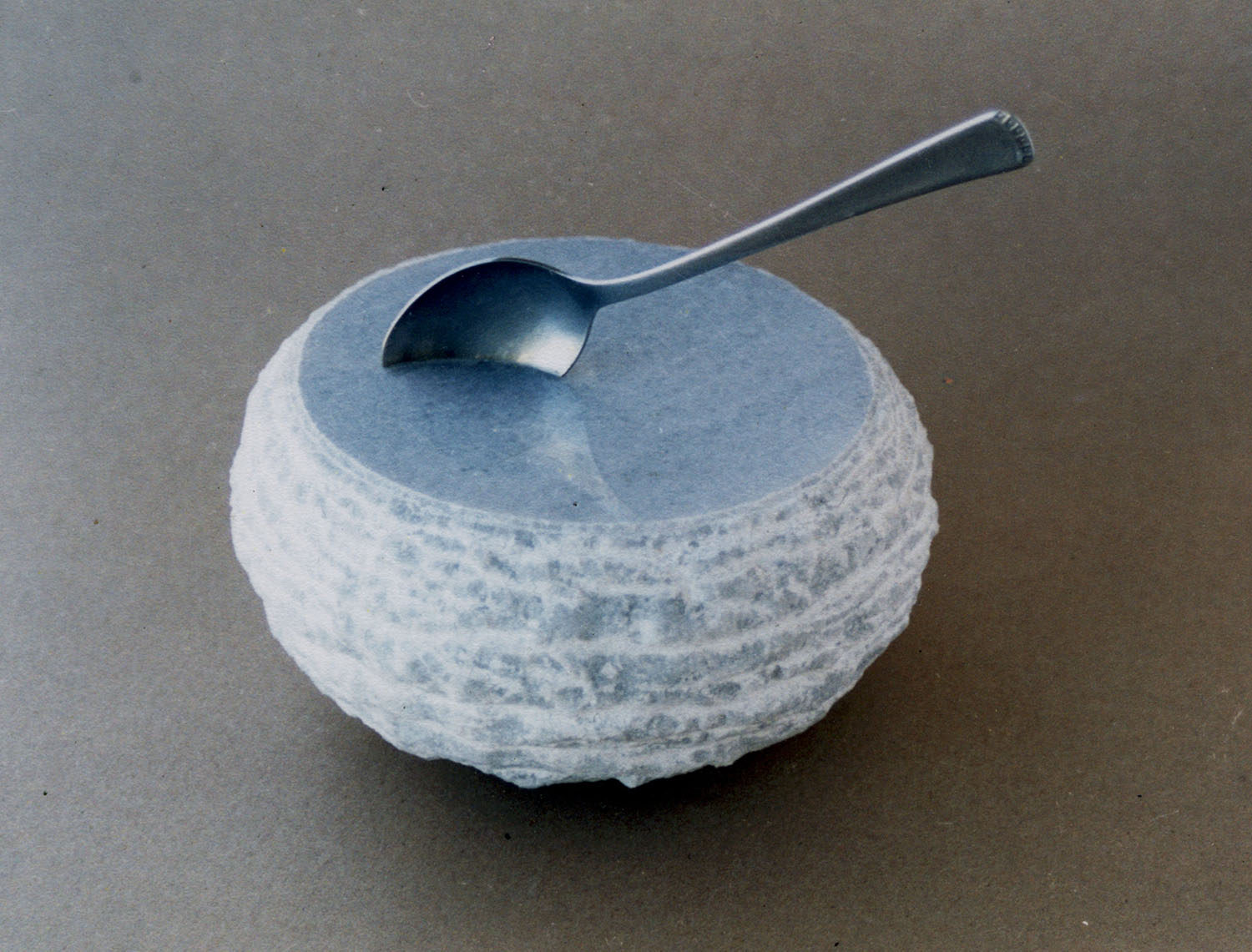
“SOUP” 1995 Marble, spoon 23x20x20 cm. Israel

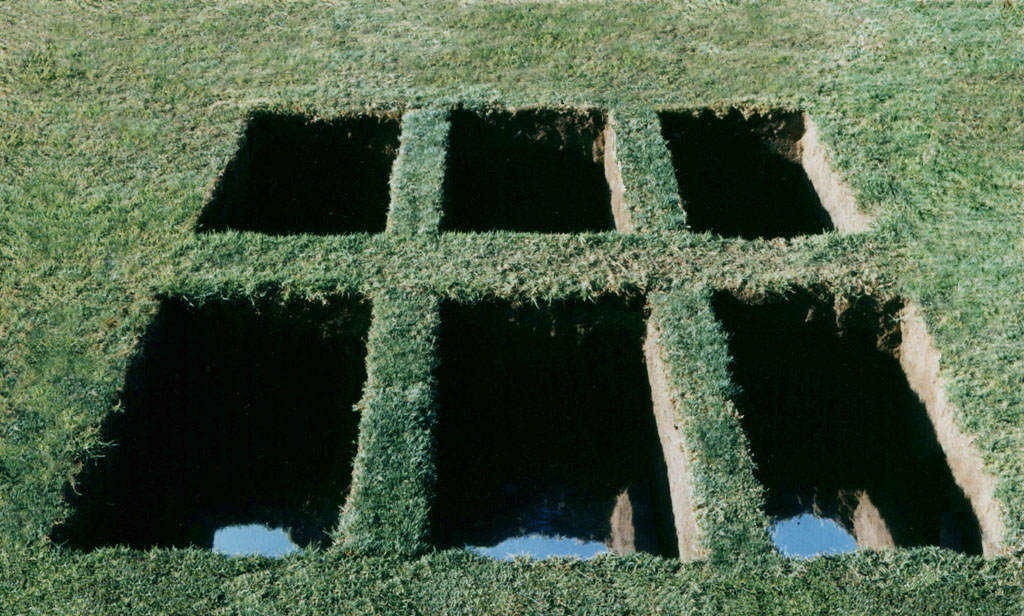
“WINDOW INTO ANOTHER WORLD” 1989 Soil, grass, mirror 90x500x300 cm. Givat-Brener, Israel.

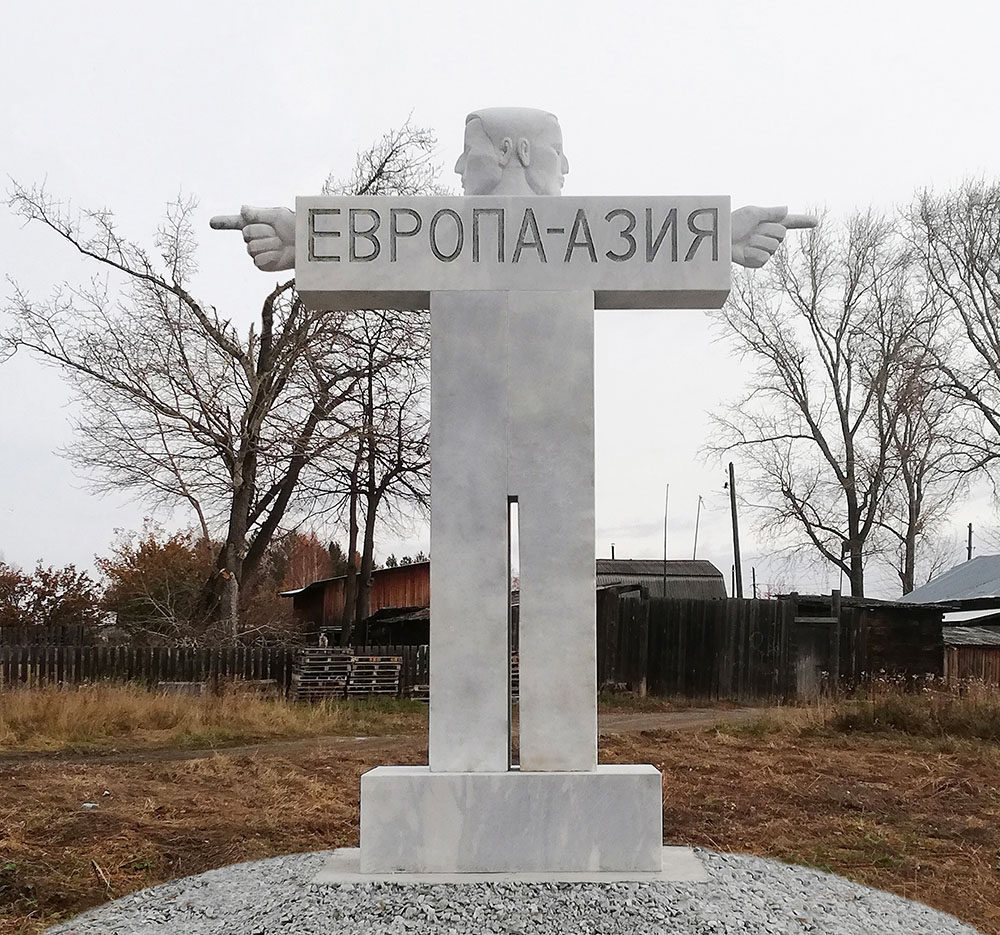
“URAL” 2019 marble, 400x300x80 cm. Mramorskoe, Ural, Russia.

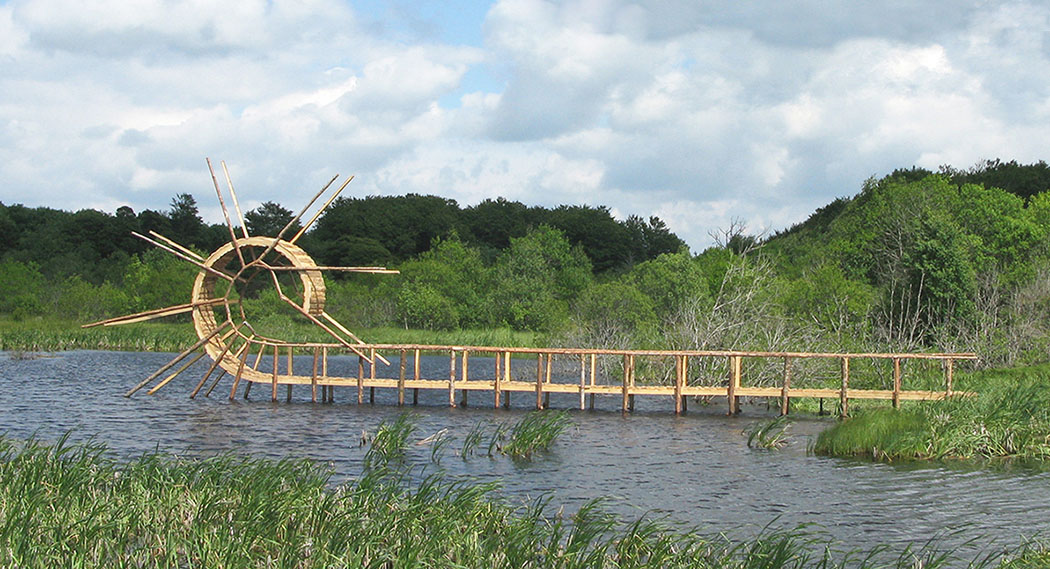
“BACK FLIP BRIDGE” 2009 Wood, 550x1850x80 cm. Massif du Sancy, France.

== Selected symposiums, competitions and exhibitions ==
2020 “Corona in the Green Gallery” Exhibition. Green Gallery - open air gallery for Environmental Art. Israel.

2020 International Stone Sculpture symposium. Ganey Tikva. Israel.

2020 Galkot International Sculpture Symposium. Baglung. Nepal.

2019 The 3rd “Spoonbill Cup” Public Art Exhibition, China.

2019 ”The Marble Mile Festival”, Poleskoi, Ural, Russia.

2018 “China Tongchuan Xuanzang Road” international sculpture symposium. Tongchuan. China.

2018 FAD, El Primero Simposio Internacional de Esculturea. University of Mendoza. Argentina.

2018 International Stone Sculpture symposium .Maalot-Tarshiha. Israel.

2017 “Winners of Ministry of Culture Prize Exhibition”, MOBY Museum, Bat Yam, Israel.

2017 The 7th Beijing International Art Biennale, National Art Museum of China. China.

2017 International Land Art Residency, Narrative Movements Komdhara, Hooghly, India.

2016 “Bienal Internacional de Escultura Competition”, Resistencia. Argentina.

2015 "Center of point is on the side". The sixth Moscow Biennale of Contemporary Art, Moscow.

2013 “Setouchi Trienale”, International Exhibition. Sakaide. Japan.

2012 "Hidden Cities" International ArtExpo, Koza Art Association, Istanbul, Turkey.

2011 "Sea art festival" Busan Biennale, Busan, Korea.

2011 “100 years of Tsinghua University” International Exhibition . Beijing, China.

2009 “Ritual Cut” project. Artist Residence grant, Pedvale Open Air Art Museum, Latvia.

2009 "Horizons Rencontre Art Nature" International Exhibition, Massif du Sancy, France.

2008 "La Piera Musa Agresti" Prize, Cultural Center Domo Dorossa, Italy.

2003 Fuzhow International Sculpture Exhibition. Fuzhow, China.

1995 International Female Biennale. Stockholm, Sweden.

1991 "Israel Contemporary Sculpture". Museum HRA, Japan.

1988 "40 from Israel". Brooklyn Museum, New York, USA.
