= Ojārs =

- Gender: Male
- Name day: 11 November

Origin
- Meaning: boisterous
- Region of origin: Latvia

Ojārs is a Latvian masculine given name and may refer to:

- Ojārs Arvīds Feldbergs (born 1947), Latvian sculptor
- Ojārs Grīnbergs (1942–2016), Latvian singer
- Ojārs Ēriks Kalniņš (1949–2021), Latvian politician and diplomat
- Ojārs Kehris (born 1956), Latvian politician
- Ojārs Siliņš (born 1993), Latvian basketball player
- Ojārs Vācietis (1933–1983), Latvian author
