= Sea art festival =

Festival in Seoul

The panoramic view of Sea Art Festival 2017

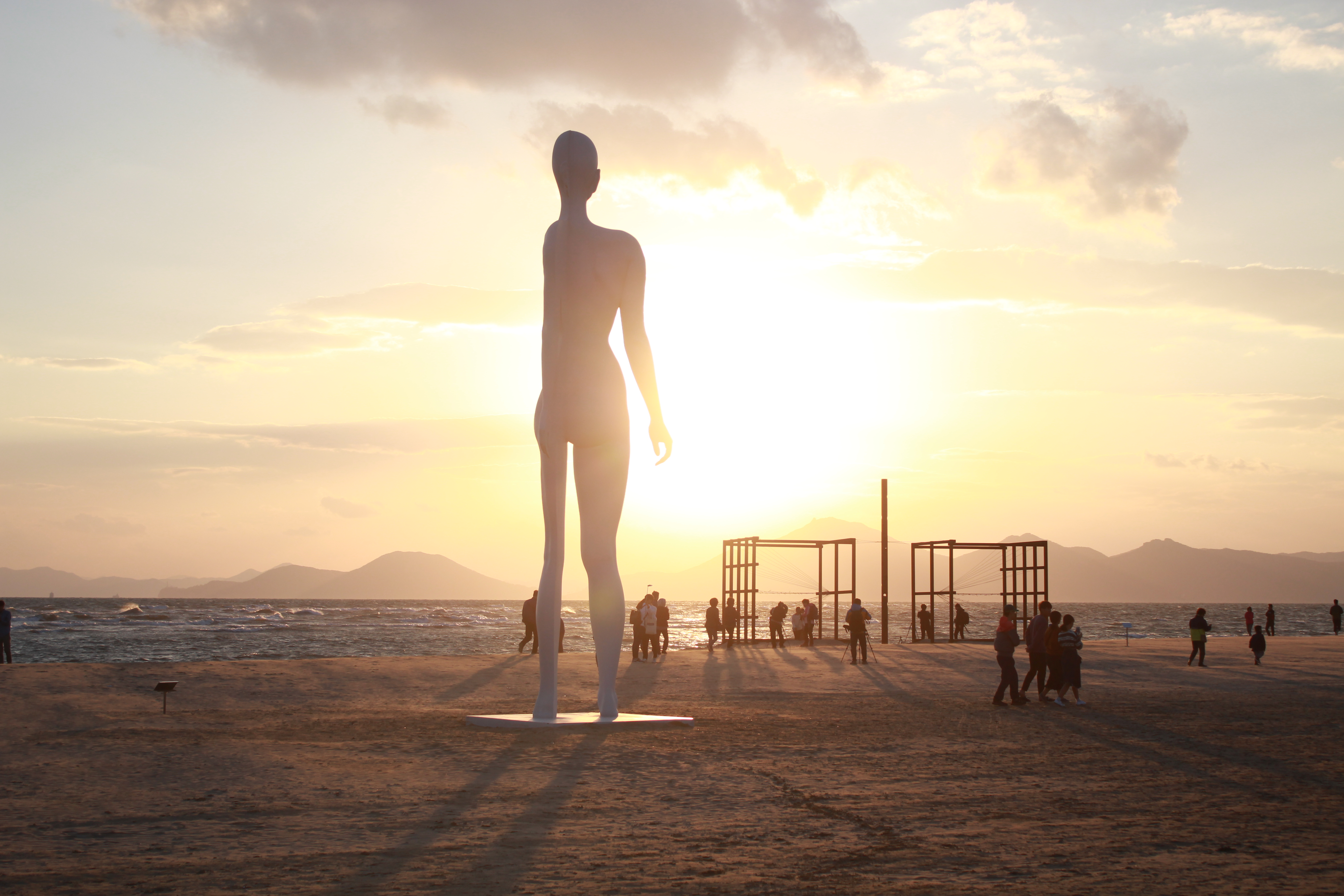
The panoramic view of Sea Art Festival 2015

Founded in 1987 as the pre-Olympics event of the 1988 Summer Olympics in Seoul, South Korea, the Sea Art Festival was held annually until 1995.

After its eighth edition in 1995, it got integrated with the Busan Biennale from 2000 to 2010 (formerly known as PICAF). The Sea Festival has been known to utilize the sea, the natural environment, as exhibition space, showcasing site-specific installations, and in 2006, the exhibition began to manifest the flux and discourse of contemporary art, not limiting itself to only outdoor installations. In 2011, the Sea Art Festival faced its historic juncture when it became an independent exhibition with an intention of establishing a new art brand that is young and experimental.

By hosting exhibitions by the sea, the Sea Art Festival has grown into a unique and specialized event that reflects the natural environment and conditions of the local area. The Sea Art Festival has been critical in site-specific public art, extending its exhibition space beyond cubic indoor premises to living spaces, where everyday lives are present, and blending the nature and art. Furthermore, through the formal destruction of space and the freedom of being both indoor and outdoor, the Sea Art Festival has become the unique marine art brand of Busan that is young, experimental, communicative and site-specific.

The Sea Art Festival 2023, titled Flickering Shores, Sea Imaginaries, was held from October 14 to November 19, 2023. The festival was led by Greek director Irini Papadimitriou, with 43 artists from both Korea and abroad participating. They collaborated with various institutions and organizations to create artworks and programs. Preparations for the Sea Art Festival 2025 are currently underway.

== History ==
Year	Title	Period	Venue	Director	Theme	Note
2023	Sea Art Festival 2023	14. Oct~19. Nov. 2023(37 days)	Ilgwang Beach	Irini Papadimitriou	Flickering Shores, Sea Imaginaries	
2021	Sea Art Festival 2021	16. Oct~14. Nov. 2021(30 days)	Ilgwang Beach	Ritika BISWAS	NON-/HUMAN ASSEMBLAGES	
2019	Sea Art Festival 2019	28. Sep~27. Oct. 2019(30 days)	Dadepo Beach	Seo Sangho	SEA OF HEARTBREAK	
2017	Sea Art Festival 2017	16. Sep~15. Oct. 2017(30 days)	Dadepo Beach	Do, Tae-Keun	Ars Ludens: Sea+Art+Fun	
2015	Sea Art Festival 2015	19. Sep~18. Oct. 2015(30 days)	Dadepo Beach	Sung-H0 KIM	See—Sea & Seed	
2013	Sea Art Festival 2013	14. Sep~7. Oct. 2013(24 days)	Songdo Beach	Tae-Won Park	With Songdo : Remembrance·Marks·People	
2011	Sea Art Festival 2011	1. Oct~21. Oct. 2011(21 days)	Songdo Beach	Exhibition Planning Committee (Jong-Gu Kim, Tae-Geun Do, Byoung-Hak Ryu, Tae-Won Park, Seung-Bo Jun)	SONGDDO	

*After 8th Sea Art Festival, the Sea Art Festival Had been integrated into Busan Biennale and it has been held independently since Sea Art Festival 2011.

- 1st Sea Art Festival | 15~24. Sep. 1987 | Haeundae Beach | 32 Artists(Team)
- 2nd Sea Art Festival | 15~25. Sep. 1988 | Haeundae Beach | 28 Artists(Team)
- 3rd Sea Art Festival | 25. Sep.~3. Oct. 1989 | Gwangalli Beach | 26 Artists(Team)
- 4th Sea Art Festival | 5. Sep. ~ 24. Oct. 1990 | Gwangalli Beach | 27 Artists(Team)
- 5th Sea Art Festival | 26. Sep. ~6. Oct. 1991 | Gwangalli Beach | 27 Artists(Team)
- 6th Sea Art Festival | 4~14. Oct. 1992 | Gwangalli Beach | 70 Artists(Team)
- 7th Sea Art Festival | 1~14. Oct. 1993 | Haeundae Beach, Dongbaek Art Center | 32 Artists(Team)
- 8th Sea Art Festival | 22. Sep. ~ 1. Oct. 1995 | Haeundae Beach, Busan Cultural Center, Performance hall of Paradise Beach Hotel | 28 Artists (Team)

== Program ==
The festival has been made even more diverse with the inclusion of festival programs and education programs based on cooperation with Busan-area artistic groups. It has created an environment for harmony and shared benefits for the local art community.

== Organizing Committee ==
- Official Name : Busan Biennale Organizing Committee
- : December 23, 1999
- Members: 82 (as of 2018)
- Components: General Meeting, Board of Directors, Executive Committee, Executive Office and others
