= Pedvale Open Air Museum =

Museum in Latvia

Pedvāle Open Air Art Museum
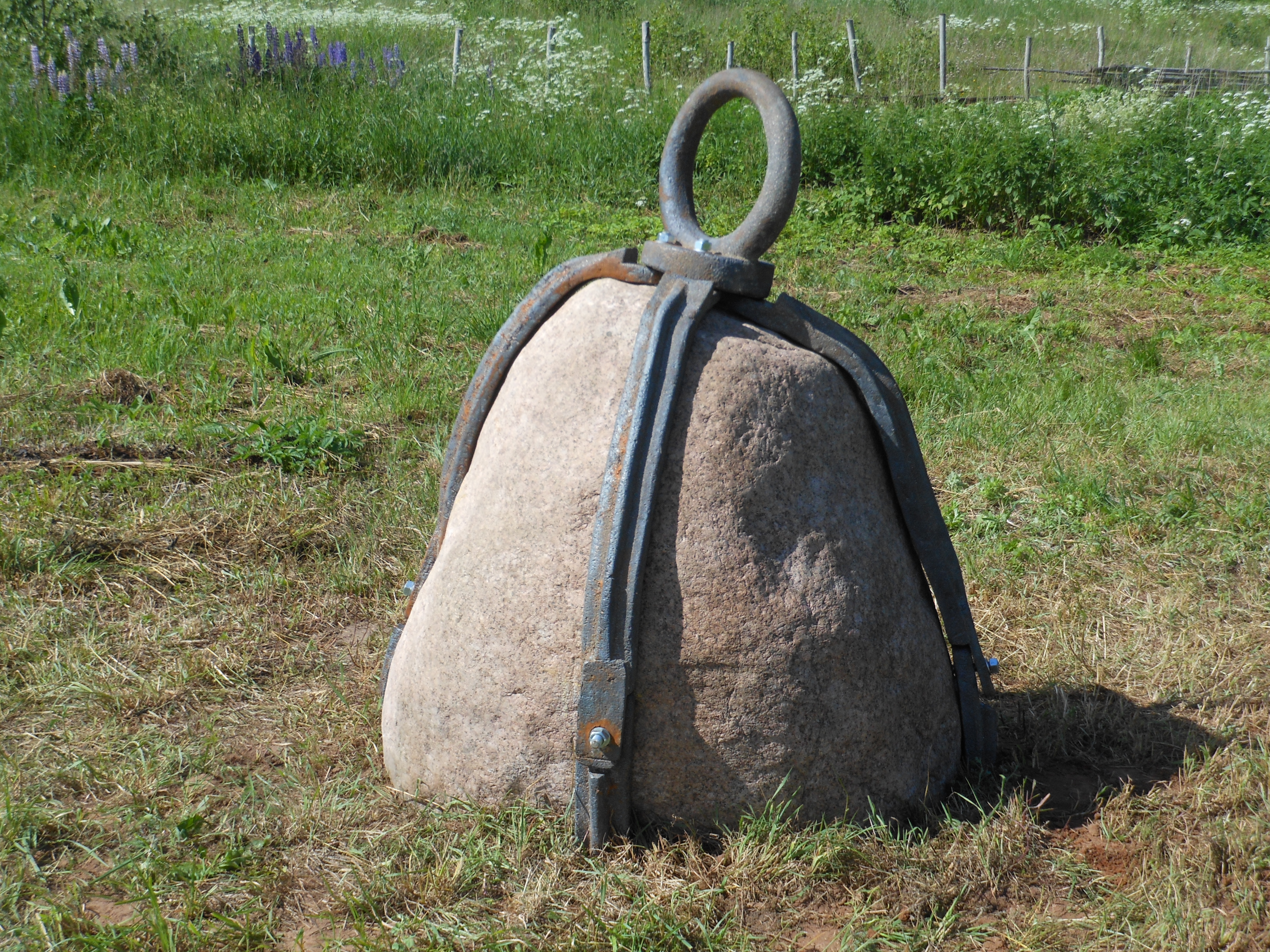
- Sekimori Ishi
- Interactive map of Pedvāle Open Air Art Museum
- Type: Sculpture park and botanic garden
- Location: near Sabile, Latvia
- Coordinates: 57.0339°N 22.5658°E
- Area: 200 hectares (490 acres)
- Created: 1991
- Operator: Ojārs Arvīds Feldbergs
- Open: the museum is open every day. From 1 May to 11 October 10:00 – 18:00; from 12 October to 30 April 10:00 – 16:00.
- Website: http://www.pedvale.lv

The Pedvāle Open Air Art Museum (Latvian: Pedvāles Brīvdabas mākslas muzejs) is a State Historical Monument near Sabile, Talsi Municipality, Latvia. It was founded in 1992 by Ojārs Arvīds Feldbergs as a setting for environmental art.

== Abava River Valley ==
The museum preserves the cultural landscape of the Abava River valley.

== Art at Pedvale ==
The museum has a permanent collection of more than 150 outdoor sculptures by an international group of artists. It was the site of the 7th International Conference on Contemporary Cast Iron Art in 2014.

== White Princess ==
The park is said to be the residence of the White Princess, a Latvian ghost. She is more often felt than seen, and it said to draw people to come back, or to stay at Pedvāle.

== Flora and fauna ==
The park contains native Latvian plants and animals, to fulfill its mission to preserve the scenic landscapes of the Abava Valley. Blooming wildflowers include lupins, which are in bloom for the summer solstice. Animals include the hedgehog, Eurasian beaver, and deer. Birds include the stork and cuckoo. 03

== Awards ==
The museum shared the UNESCO award for preservation and development of the cultural landscape in 1999. In 1999 the activities at Pedvāle museum were recognized and awarded the UNESCO Melina Mercuri International Prize for the Safeguarding and Management of Cultural Landscapes.
