= Ojārs Arvīds Feldbergs =

Latvian sculptor

- Born: 10 October 1947 (age 78); Riga
- Known for: Sculpture
- Awards: Order of the Three Stars

Ojārs Arvīds Feldbergs (born 10 October 1947) is a Latvian sculptor. He founded the Pedvāle Open Air Museum in 1992.

== Biography ==
Ojārs Feldbergs was born in Riga, Latvia. He graduated from the Department of Sculpture at the Latvian Academy of Fine Arts in 1976.

== The Defense of Riga ==
In January, 1991, four large granite blocks from his studio formed the political artwork "Barricade". This blocked a street in Old Riga, to prevent entry of Soviet tanks. These blocks were later used in 2005 to form the sculpture "Swell". The blocks themselves now rest at the Pedvāle Open Air Art Museum, where they have been used in other patriotic works and displays.

== Sculptures ==
In February 2016, a design by Feldbergs was announced as the provisional winner of a contest for a monument in Daugavpils to commemorate the centenary of Latvian independence in 2018.

== National Honors ==
In 2009 he was awarded the Order of the Three Stars.
