= San Francisco de Dos Ríos =

District in San José canton, San José province, Costa Rica

- District
- San Francisco de Dos Ríos district
- San Francisco de Dos Ríos district location in Costa Rica
- Coordinates: 9.9082933°N 84.0581714°W
- Country: Costa Rica
- Province: San José
- Canton: San José

Area
  - Total: 2.64 km^{2} (1.02 sq mi)
- Elevation: 1,168 m (3,832 ft)

Population (2011)
  - Total: 20,209
  - Density: 7,650/km^{2} (19,800/sq mi)
- Time zone: UTC−06:00
- Postal code: 10106

San Francisco de Dos Ríos is the sixth district of the San José canton, in the San José province of Costa Rica. It is one of the administrative units surrounding San José downtown (officially composed by the districts of El Carmen, Merced, Hospital and Catedral). The district is primarily residential and industrial. It's also famous for the numerous motels between its boundaries.

== Geography ==
San Francisco de Dos Ríos has an area of 2.64 km^{2} and an elevation of 1,168 metres.

It lies on the south-east of the canton, between Curridabat and Desamparados cantons (bordering them to the east and to the south respectively) and between the districts of San Sebastián and Zapote (bordering them also to the west and to the north respectively).

== Locations ==
San Francisco de Dos Ríos district includes the "barrios" (or neighbourhoods) of Ahogados (part of it), Camelias, Cinco Esquinas, Coopeguaria, El Bosque, El Faro, Fátima, Hispano, San Marino Sur, I Griega, La Cabaña, Lincoln, Lomas de San Francisco, Maalot, Méndez, Pacífica, San Francisco de Dos Ríos (center), Sauces, Saucitos and Zurquí.

== Demographics ==
Historical population
Census	Pop.	±% p.a.
1864	461	—
1883	493	+0.35%
1892	562	+1.47%
1927	730	+0.75%
1950	2,319	+5.15%
1963	6,422	+8.15%
1973	10,241	+4.78%
1984	15,256	+3.69%
2000	21,724	+2.23%
2011	20,209	−0.66%
2022	21,682	+0.64%
Source: Instituto Nacional de Estadística y Censos; Centro Centroamericano de Población

For the 2011 census, San Francisco de Dos Ríos had a population of 20,209 inhabitants.

== Transportation ==
=== Road transportation ===
The district is covered by the following road routes:

- National Route 39
- National Route 204
- National Route 207
- National Route 209
- National Route 211
