= Zapote =

District in San José canton, San José province, Costa Rica

- District
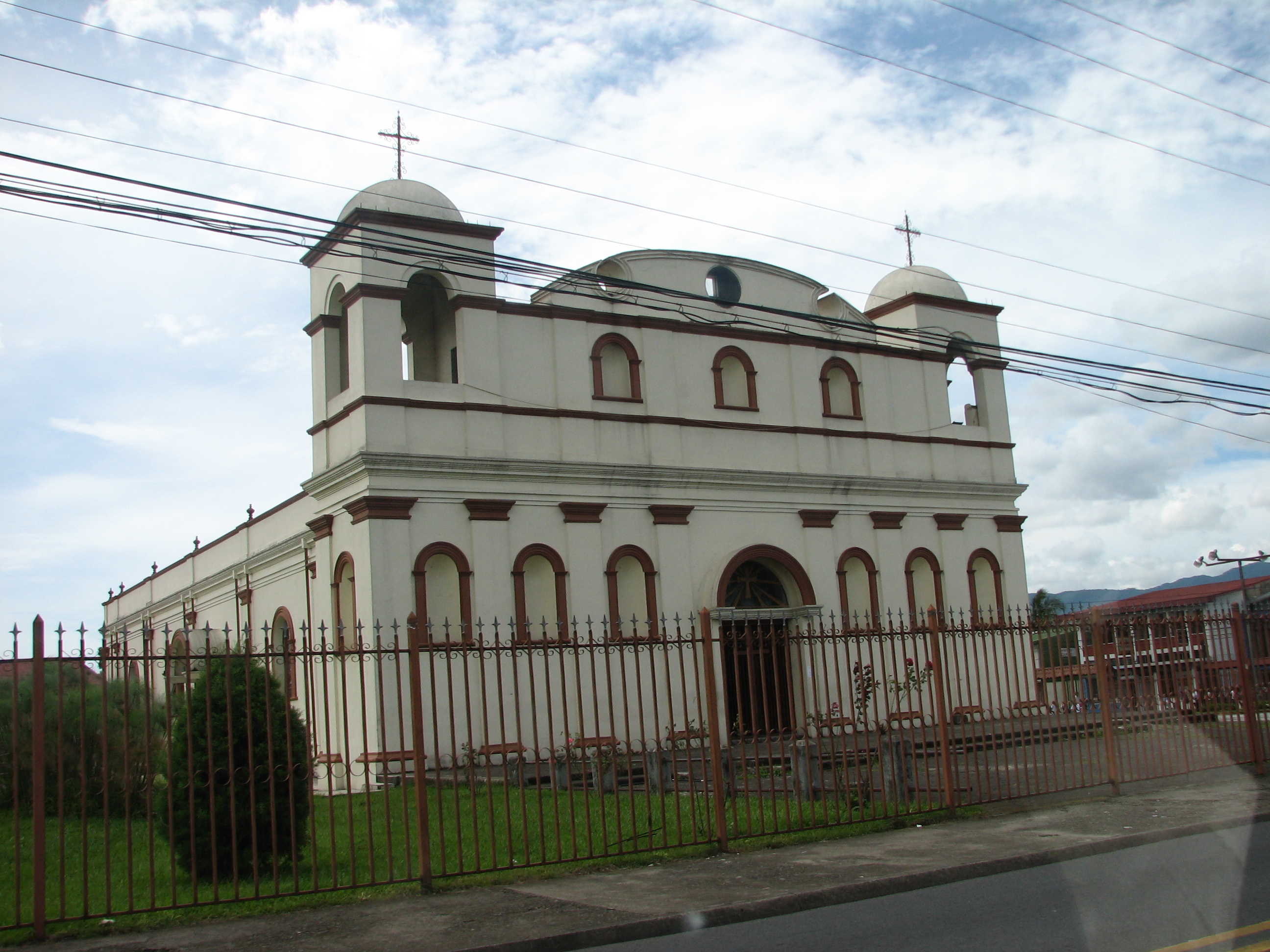
- Catholic Church of Zapote located across the street from Parque Nicaragua, the district's main park.
- Zapote district
- Zapote district location in Costa Rica
- Coordinates: 9.9203408°N 84.0592286°W
- Country: Costa Rica
- Province: San José
- Canton: San José

Area
  - Total: 2.87 km^{2} (1.11 sq mi)
- Elevation: 1,176 m (3,858 ft)

Population (2011)
  - Total: 18,679
  - Density: 6,510/km^{2} (16,900/sq mi)
- Time zone: UTC−06:00
- Postal code: 10105

Zapote is the fifth district of the San José canton in the San José province of Costa Rica. It is one of the administrative units surrounding San José downtown (officially composed of the districts of El Carmen, Merced, Hospital, and Catedral). The district is primarily residential, although there are some government buildings, standing out the Presidential House, seat of the government.

== Toponymy ==
It is named after the sapote tree and its fruits, which is written zapote in Spanish.

== Geography ==
Zapote has an area of 2.87 km^{2} and an elevation of 1,176 metres.

It is located on the east of the canton, lying between Montes de Oca Canton and Curridabat Canton (bordering them to the north and to the east respectively). The district also borders San Francisco district to the south, and Catedral district to the west.

== Demographics ==
Historical population
Census	Pop.	±% p.a.
1864	773	—
1883	773	+0.00%
1892	994	+2.83%
1927	1,711	+1.56%
1950	6,895	+6.25%
1963	12,769	+4.85%
1973	17,311	+3.09%
1984	18,504	+0.61%
2000	20,753	+0.72%
2011	18,679	−0.95%
2022	19,684	+0.48%
Source: Instituto Nacional de Estadística y Censos; Centro Centroamericano de Población

For the 2011 census, Zapote had a population of 18,679 inhabitants.

== Transportation ==
=== Road transportation ===
The district is covered by the following road routes:

- National Route 39
- National Route 204
- National Route 215

== Locations ==
Zapote district includes the "barrios" (or neighbourhoods) of Alborada, Calderón Muñoz, Cerrito, Córdoba, Gloria, Jardín, Las Luisas, Mangos, Montealegre, Moreno Cañas, Quesada Durán, San Dimas, San Gerardo (part of it), Trébol, Ujarrás, Vista Hermosa, Yoses Sur and Zapote Centro. The main official building in the area is the Casa Presidencial, the government building for the President of Costa Rica (but not the residence, which would be the private residence of the presidente) and the executive power, established there since 1986.
