= San Rafael District =

San Rafael District may refer to:

- Costa Rica:
  - San Rafael District, Alajuela, in Alajuela (canton), Alajuela province
  - San Rafael District, Escazú, in Escazú (canton), San José province
  - San Rafael District, Esparza, in Esparza (canton), Puntarenas province
  - San Rafael District, Guatuso, in Guatuso canton, Alajuela province
  - San Rafael District, La Unión, in La Unión (canton), Cartago province
  - San Rafael District, Montes de Oca, in Montes de Oca (canton), San José province
  - San Rafael District, Oreamuno, in Oreamuno (canton), Cartago province
  - San Rafael District, Poás, in Poás (canton), Alajuela province
  - San Rafael District, Puriscal, in Puriscal (canton), San José province
  - San Rafael District, San Rafael, in San Rafael (canton), Heredia province
  - San Rafael District, San Ramón, in San Ramón (canton), Alajuela province
  - San Rafael, Vázquez de Coronado, in Vázquez de Coronado (canton), San José province
  - San Rafael Abajo District, in Desamparados (canton), San José province
  - San Rafael Arriba District, in Desamparados (canton), San José province

== See also ==
- San Rafael (disambiguation)
