= San Miguel District =

San Miguel District may refer to:

- San Miguel District, Lima, in Peru
- San Miguel District, San Miguel, Peru
- San Miguel District, Manila
- San Miguel District, Paraguay, in Misiones Department, Paraguay
- San Miguel District, Cañas, in Cañas (canton), Guanacaste province, Costa Rica
- San Miguel District, Desamparados, in Desamparados (canton), San José province, Costa Rica
- San Miguel District, Naranjo, in Naranjo (canton), Alajuela province, Costa Rica
- San Miguel District, Santo Domingo, in the Santo Domingo canton, Heredia province, Costa Rica
