= San Sebastián (district) =

District in San José canton, San José province, Costa Rica

- District
- San Sebastián district
- San Sebastián district location in Costa Rica
- Coordinates: 9.9103562°N 84.0822702°W
- Country: Costa Rica
- Province: San José
- Canton: San José

Area
  - Total: 4.01 km^{2} (1.55 sq mi)
- Elevation: 1,125 m (3,691 ft)

Population (2011)
  - Total: 40,065
  - Density: 9,990/km^{2} (25,900/sq mi)
- Time zone: UTC−06:00
- Postal code: 10111

San Sebastián is the eleventh district of the San José canton, in the San José province of Costa Rica. An important residential district, San Sebastián is the third most populous and second most densely populated in the canton.

== Geography ==
San Sebastián has an area of 4.01 km^{2} and an elevation of 1,125 metres. It shares its southern border with San José Province's Alajuelita and Desamparados cantons. The district also limits its counterparts, counterclockwise: Hatillo District (west), Hospital and Catedral districts to the north, and San Francisco de Dos Ríos District to the east.

== Demographics ==
Historical population
Census	Pop.	±% p.a.
1883	650	—
1892	795	+2.26%
1927	1,401	+1.63%
1950	5,975	+6.51%
1963	23,166	+10.99%
1973	32,019	+3.29%
1984	35,081	+0.83%
2000	43,245	+1.32%
2011	40,065	−0.69%
2022	50,222	+2.08%
Source: Instituto Nacional de Estadística y Censos; Centro Centroamericano de Población

For the 2011 census, San Sebastián had a population of 40,065 inhabitants.

== Locations ==
San Sebastián District includes the "barrios" (or neighbourhoods) of Bajos Canada, Bengala, Bilbao, Cañada Sur, Carmen, Cascajal, Cerro Azul, Colombari, Colonia Kennedy, Guacamaya, Hogar Propio, Jazmin, Lopez Mateo, Los Geranios, Los Olivos, Luna Park, Mojados, Mojito, Parque de La Paz, Paso Ancho, Pavi, Presidentes, San Gerardo, San Martín, San Sebastián, Santa Rosa, Santo Domingo Sabio, Seminario, Galenos, Umará and Zorobarú.

== Transportation ==
=== Road transportation ===
The district is covered by the following road routes:

- National Route 39
- National Route 175
- National Route 209
- National Route 213
- National Route 214
