= Damas District =

District in Desamparados canton, San José province, Costa Rica

Damas
- District
- Interactive map of Damas
- Damas district location in Costa Rica
- Coordinates: 9.8888666°N 84.0453729°W
- Country: Costa Rica
- Province: San José
- Canton: Desamparados
- Creation: 8 October 1968

Area
  - Total: 2.57 km^{2} (0.99 sq mi)
- Elevation: 1,180 m (3,870 ft)

Population (2011)
  - Total: 13,175
  - Density: 5,130/km^{2} (13,300/sq mi)
- Time zone: UTC−06:00
- Postal code: 10310

Damas is a district of the Desamparados canton, in the San José province of Costa Rica.

== History ==
Damas was created on 8 October 1968 by Ley 33. Segregated from Patarrá.

== Geography ==
Damas has an area of 2.57 km^{2} and an elevation of 1,180 metres.

== Demographics ==
Historical population
Census	Pop.	±% p.a.
1973	4,376	—
1984	7,351	+4.83%
2000	12,993	+3.62%
2011	13,175	+0.13%
2022	13,475	+0.20%
Source: Instituto Nacional de Estadística y Censos; Centro Centroamericano de Población

For the 2011 census, Damas had a population of 13,175 inhabitants.

== Transportation ==
=== Road transportation ===
The district is covered by the following road routes:

- National Route 212
