= Frailes, Desamparados, Costa Rica =

District in Desamparados canton, San José province, Costa Rica

Frailes
- District
- Interactive map of Frailes
- Frailes district location in Costa Rica
- Coordinates: 9.7546692°N 84.0691465°W
- Country: Costa Rica
- Province: San José
- Canton: Desamparados

Area
  - Total: 19.57 km^{2} (7.56 sq mi)
- Elevation: 1,615 m (5,299 ft)

Population (2011)
  - Total: 3,772
  - Density: 192.7/km^{2} (499.2/sq mi)
- Time zone: UTC−06:00
- Postal code: 10306

Frailes is a district of the Desamparados canton, in the San José province of Costa Rica, around one hour south of Desamparados in Costa Rica.

== Geography ==
Frailes has an area of 19.57 km^{2} and an elevation of 1,615 metres.

== Demographics ==
Historical population
Census	Pop.	±% p.a.
1883	349	—
1892	401	+1.56%
1927	2,735	+5.64%
1950	1,367	−2.97%
1963	1,959	+2.81%
1973	2,491	+2.43%
1984	2,622	+0.47%
2000	3,504	+1.83%
2011	3,772	+0.67%
2022	4,111	+0.79%
Source: Instituto Nacional de Estadística y Censos; Centro Centroamericano de Población

For the 2011 census, Frailes had a population of 3,772 inhabitants.

== Transportation ==
=== Road transportation ===
The district is covered by the following road routes:

- National Route 222
