= Rosario District, Desamparados =

District in Desamparados canton, San José province, Costa Rica

Rosario
- District
- Rosario district
- Rosario district location in Costa Rica
- Coordinates: 9.7974878°N 84.0871247°W
- Country: Costa Rica
- Province: San José
- Canton: Desamparados

Area
  - Total: 14.77 km^{2} (5.70 sq mi)
- Elevation: 1,321 m (4,334 ft)

Population (2011)
  - Total: 3,088
  - Density: 209.1/km^{2} (541.5/sq mi)
- Time zone: UTC−06:00
- Postal code: 10309

Rosario is a district of the Desamparados canton, in the San José province of Costa Rica.

== Geography ==
Rosario has an area of 14.77 km^{2} and an elevation of 1,321 metres.

== Demographics ==
Historical population
Census	Pop.	±% p.a.
1883	236	—
1892	431	+6.92%
1950	797	+1.07%
1963	1,210	+3.26%
1973	1,548	+2.49%
1984	1,606	+0.33%
2000	2,710	+3.32%
2011	3,088	+1.19%
2022	3,465	+1.05%
Source: Instituto Nacional de Estadística y Censos; Centro Centroamericano de Población

For the 2011 census, Rosario had a population of 3,088 inhabitants.

== Transportation ==
=== Road transportation ===
The district is covered by the following road routes:

- National Route 222
- National Route 304
