= Costa Rican Center of Science and Culture =

Museum complex in Costa Rica

- Centro Costarricense de la Ciencia y la Cultura
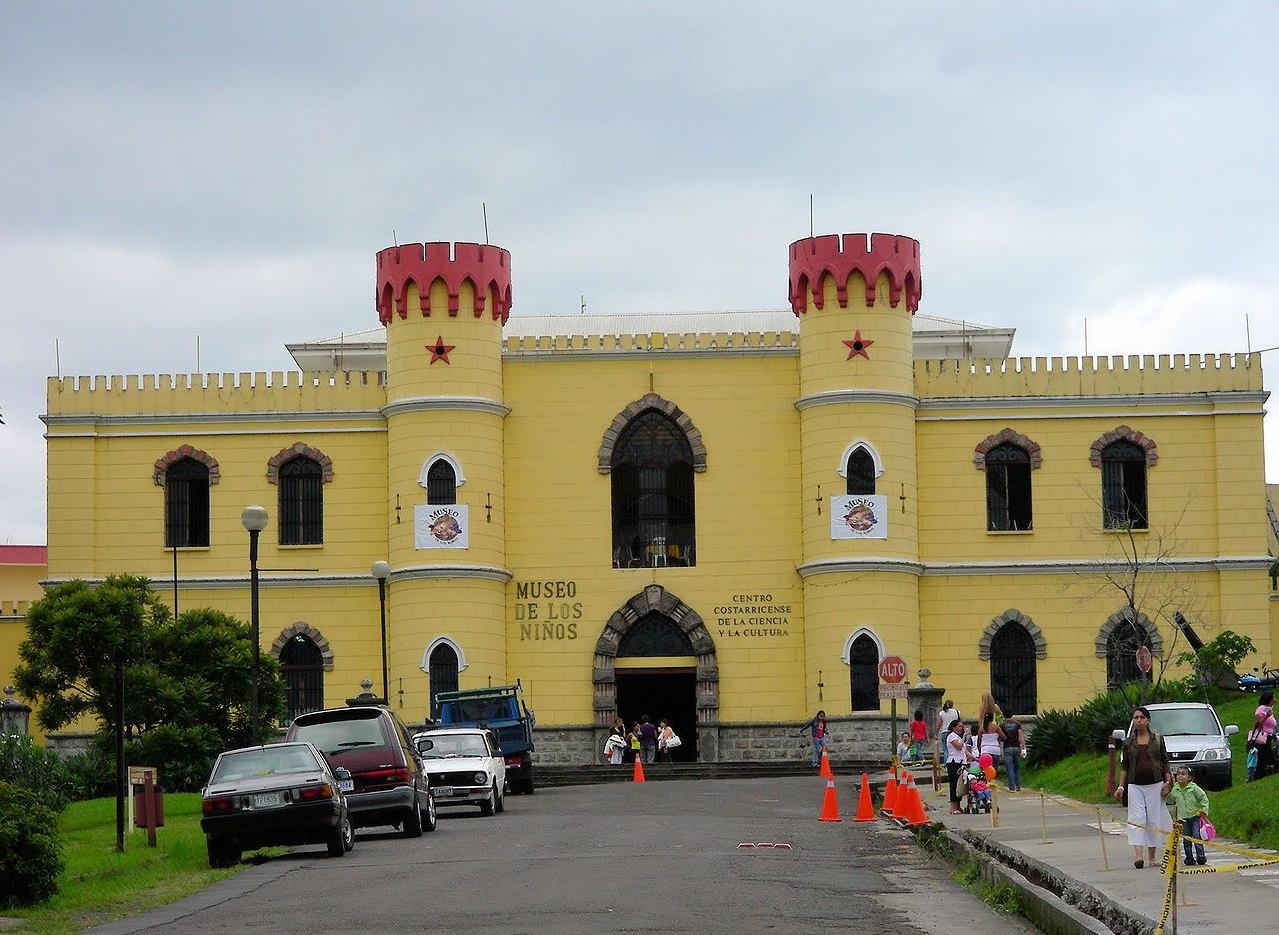
- Front façade of the center

- Shown within Costa Rica
- Established: 27 April 1994
- Location: Calle 4 and Avenida 9 Merced, San José, Costa Rica
- Coordinates: 9.941051°N 84.080234°W
- Visitors: 270,000 (2005)
- President: Fabiola Rodríguez Diez
- Website: www.museocr.org

The Centro Costarricense de la Ciencia y la Cultura (Costa Rican Center of Science and Culture) is a science and culture museum complex in Costa Rica. Located in a fortress-like building that once served as the central penitentiary between 1910 and 1979, the center was inaugurated in 1994. It contains a number of important institutions including the National Auditorium, the Museo de los Niños, the National Gallery and a number of others.

== History ==
The center was established in the building that housed the old Central Penitentiary, which itself was founded in 1909, and was open for 70 years. This penitentiary was closed in 1979 by Rodrigo Carazo's administration leaving the building empty and abandoned for several years. After the prison closed, it became a museum.

In 1991, First Lady Gloria Bejarano Almada, wife of President Rafael Ángel Calderón, created the Fundación Ayudanos para Ayudar ("Help Us to Help Foundation" in English), to promote the center's creation, which was inaugurated on April 27, 1994. Some sections of the building such as the façade and the walls of the west wing were proclaimed historical and architectural heritage of Costa Rica in 1988. The center's stated mission is to strengthen education and promote the national scientific and technological development.

== Museo de los Niños ==
The Museo de los Niños (literally "Children's Museum" in Spanish) is an interactive children's museum that focuses on the education and entertainment of kids of all ages. It was inaugurated in 1994 as part of the center, and forms the best-known part of it. Its most infamous room is the Mouth Room, which is known as a liminal space, according to the internet.

== National Auditorium ==
The National Auditorium was conceived as a stage for all art forms. It has a lighting system, an acoustic shell, an orchestra pit, satellite communications, possibility for simultaneous translations in up to four languages and 526 seats. The auditorium has hosted several concerts of certain genres, literary contests, beauty pageants, audiovisuals, conferences, seminars, scientific and cultural congresses, and theater productions.

== National Gallery ==
The National Gallery, whose stated mission is to "bring democracy to art", was also inaugurated in 1994. It has fourteen galleries in two levels. These contain several artistic (photography, ceramics, craftsmanship, hand drawing, and graphic design), scientific, technological, and technical exhibits of both Costa Rican and international origin.

== Complejo Juvenil ==
The Complejo Juvenil ("Youth Complex" in Spanish) was inaugurated in 1999 as the fourth addition to the center. Aimed to young people between 10 and 20 years of age, it has a library, news archive, map room, A/V room and other educational elements, as well as a computer lab. It also houses a museum about the Central Penitentiary, where the former prison's history is reconstructed in a dynamic way.

== See also ==
- List of museums in Costa Rica
