= National Route 222 (Costa Rica) =

National Road Route in Costa Rica

National Secondary Route 222
- Ruta nacional secundaria 222

Route information
- Maintained by Ministry of Public Works and Transport
- Length: 26.895 km (16.712 mi)

Location
- Country: Costa Rica
- Provinces: San José, Cartago

Highway system
- National Road Network of Costa Rica
← Route 221	→ Route 223

National Secondary Route 222, or just Route 222 (Spanish: Ruta Nacional Secundaria 222, or Ruta 222) is a National Road Route of Costa Rica, located in the San José, Cartago provinces.

== Description ==
In San José province the route covers Desamparados canton (Frailes, San Cristóbal, and Rosario districts) and Aserrí canton (Tarbaca and San Gabriel districts).

In Cartago province the route covers Cartago canton (Corralillo district) and El Guarco canton (San Isidro district).
