= San Cristobal District, Costa Rica =

District in Desamparados canton, San José province, Costa Rica

San Cristóbal
- District
- San Cristóbal district
- San Cristóbal district location in Costa Rica
- Coordinates: 9.7490562°N 83.9913792°W
- Country: Costa Rica
- Province: San José
- Canton: Desamparados

Area
  - Total: 25.47 km^{2} (9.83 sq mi)
- Elevation: 1,700 m (5,600 ft)

Population (2011)
  - Total: 3,905
  - Density: 153.3/km^{2} (397.1/sq mi)
- Time zone: UTC−06:00
- Postal code: 10308

San Cristóbal is a district of the Desamparados canton, in the San José province of Costa Rica.

== Geography ==
San Cristóbal has an area of 25.47 km^{2} and an elevation of 1,700 metres.

== Demographics ==
Historical population
Census	Pop.	±% p.a.
1883	339	—
1892	429	+2.65%
1950	1,453	+2.13%
1963	1,546	+0.48%
1973	2,137	+3.29%
1984	2,286	+0.61%
2000	3,360	+2.44%
2011	3,905	+1.38%
2022	4,755	+1.81%
Source: Instituto Nacional de Estadística y Censos; Centro Centroamericano de Población

For the 2011 census, San Cristóbal had a population of 3,905 inhabitants.

== Transportation ==
=== Road transportation ===
The district is covered by the following road routes:

- National Route 222
- National Route 226
- National Route 406
