= San José Central Market =

Coordinates: 9.934702°N 84.082045°W

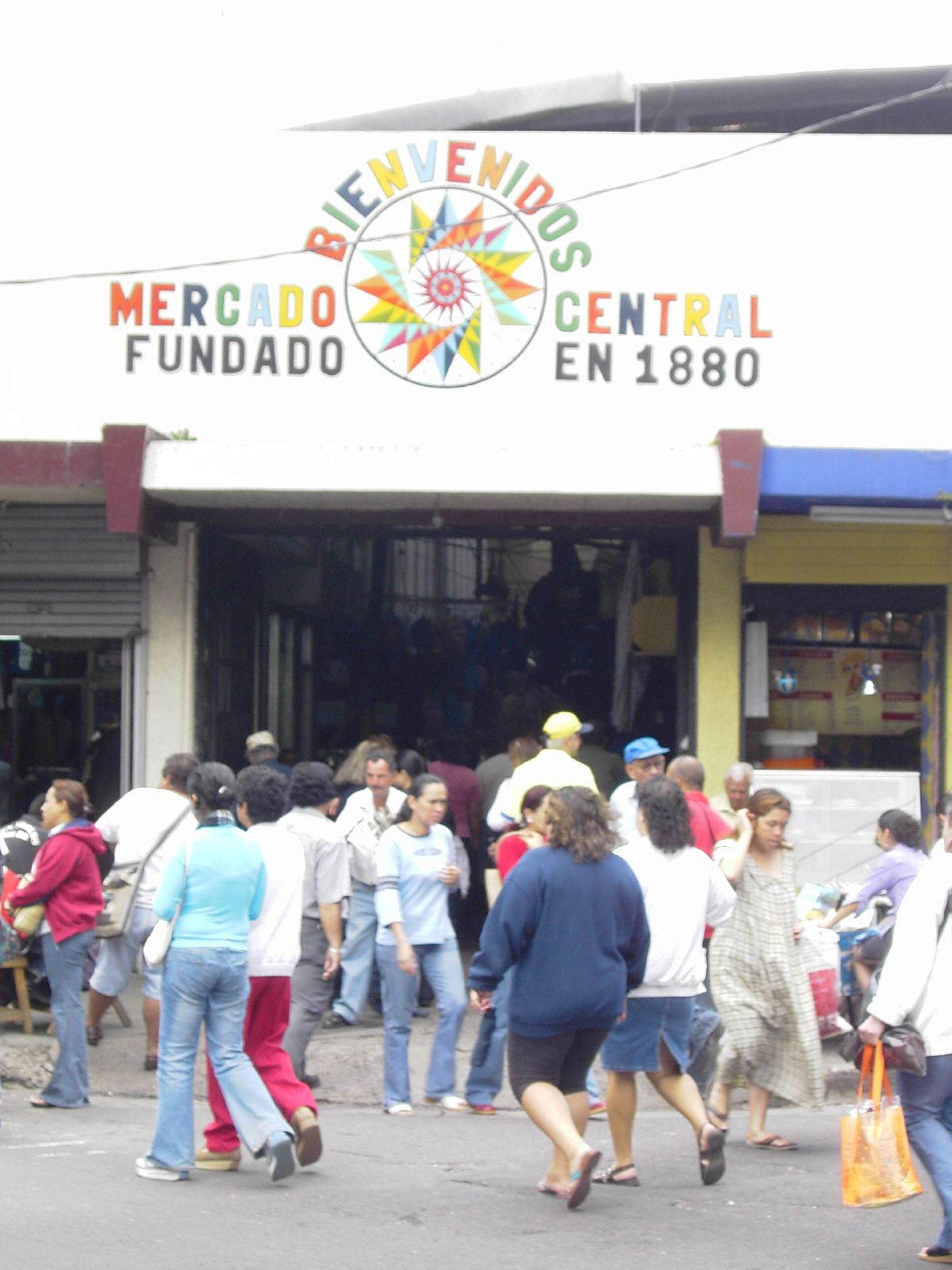
Market entrance on Avenida Central

San José Central Market (Spanish: Mercado central) is the largest market of the city of San José, Costa Rica. Established in 1880, it occupies an entire block on Avenida Central, 250m northwest of the Parque Central.

The market contains a complex of narrow alleys with over 200 shops, stalls, and cheap restaurants called sodas. A huge range of meats, fish, fruits, vegetables, coffees, and other products are for sale including snakeskin boots and cowboy saddles, herbal remedies, flowers, cooked meals, souvenirs, and local handcrafts. Tens of thousands of people visit the market daily.

Two blocks to the north is the Mercado Borbón, which specialises in food, with numerous butchers, fishmongers, and fruit vendors located there.

== Gallery ==
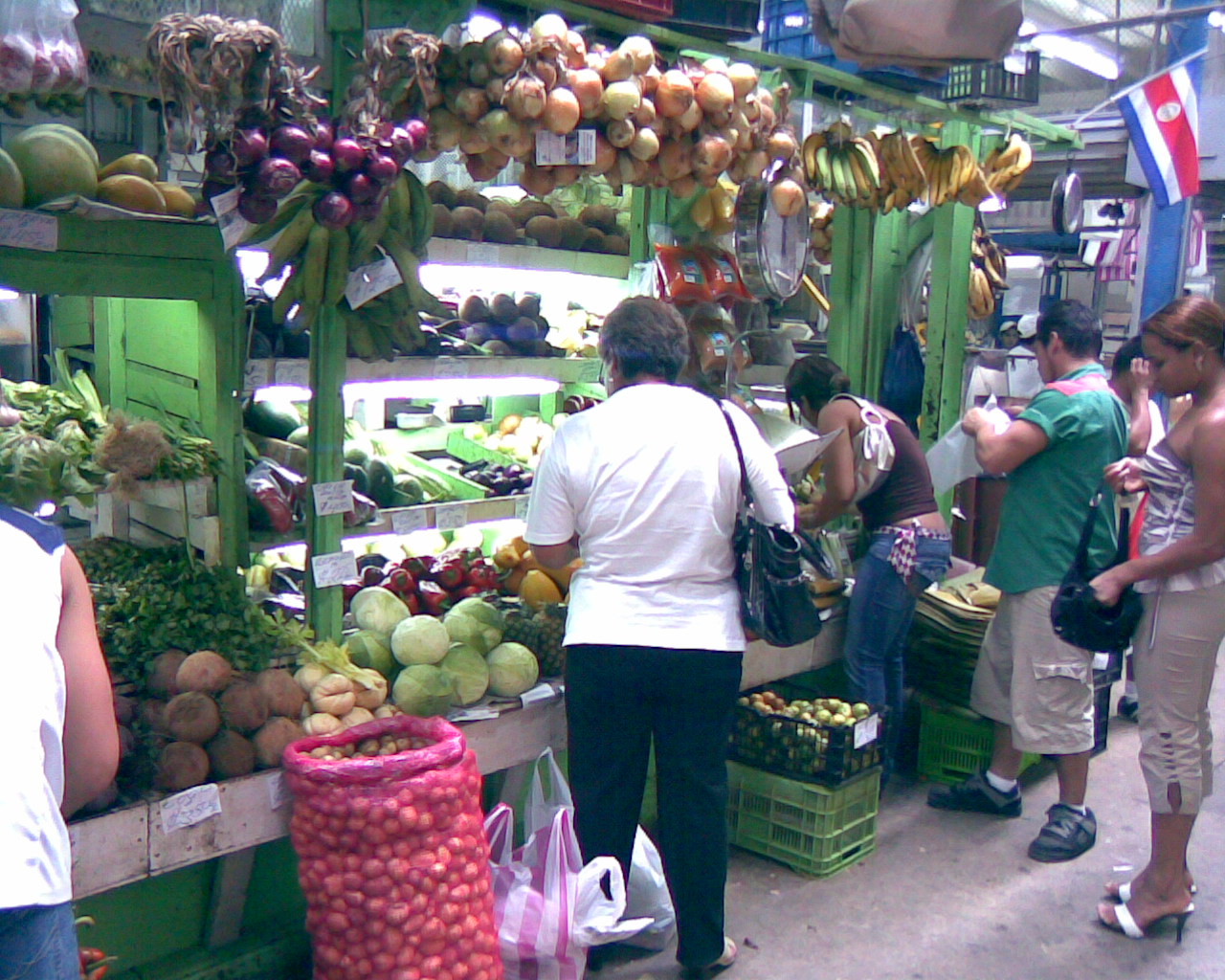
Vegetable stall in the Mercado Central

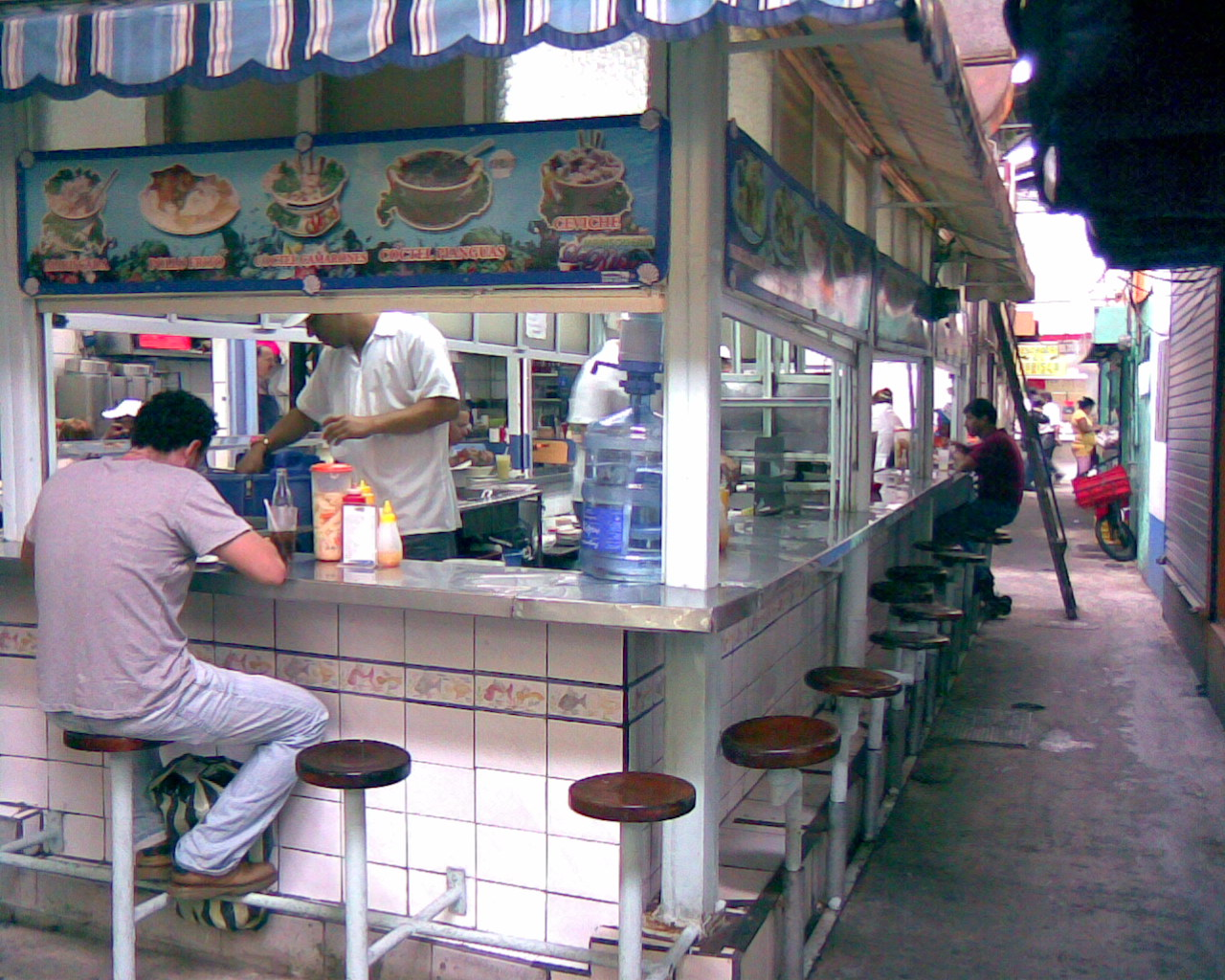
Eating at a soda in the market

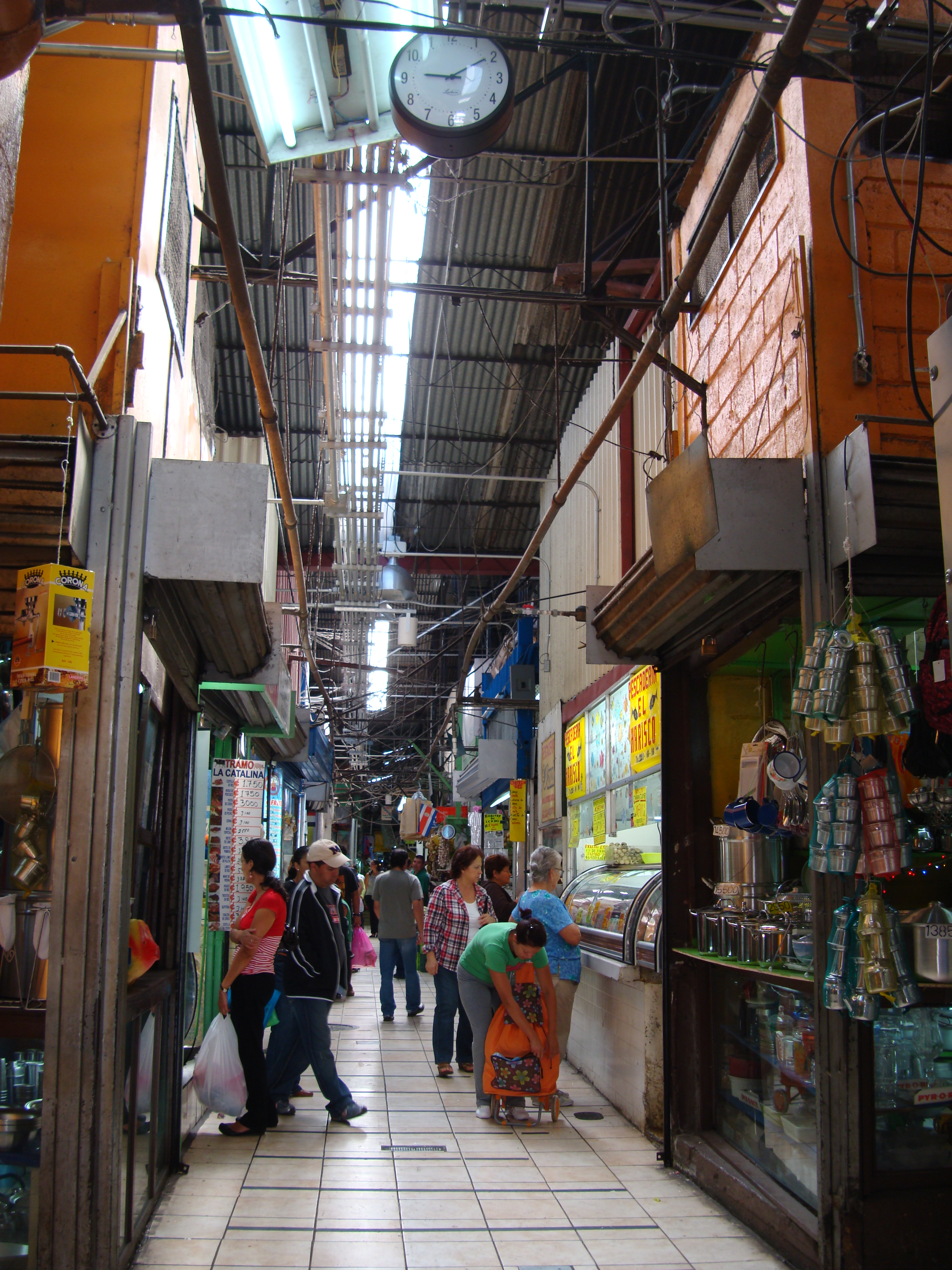
One of the alleys in the Mercado

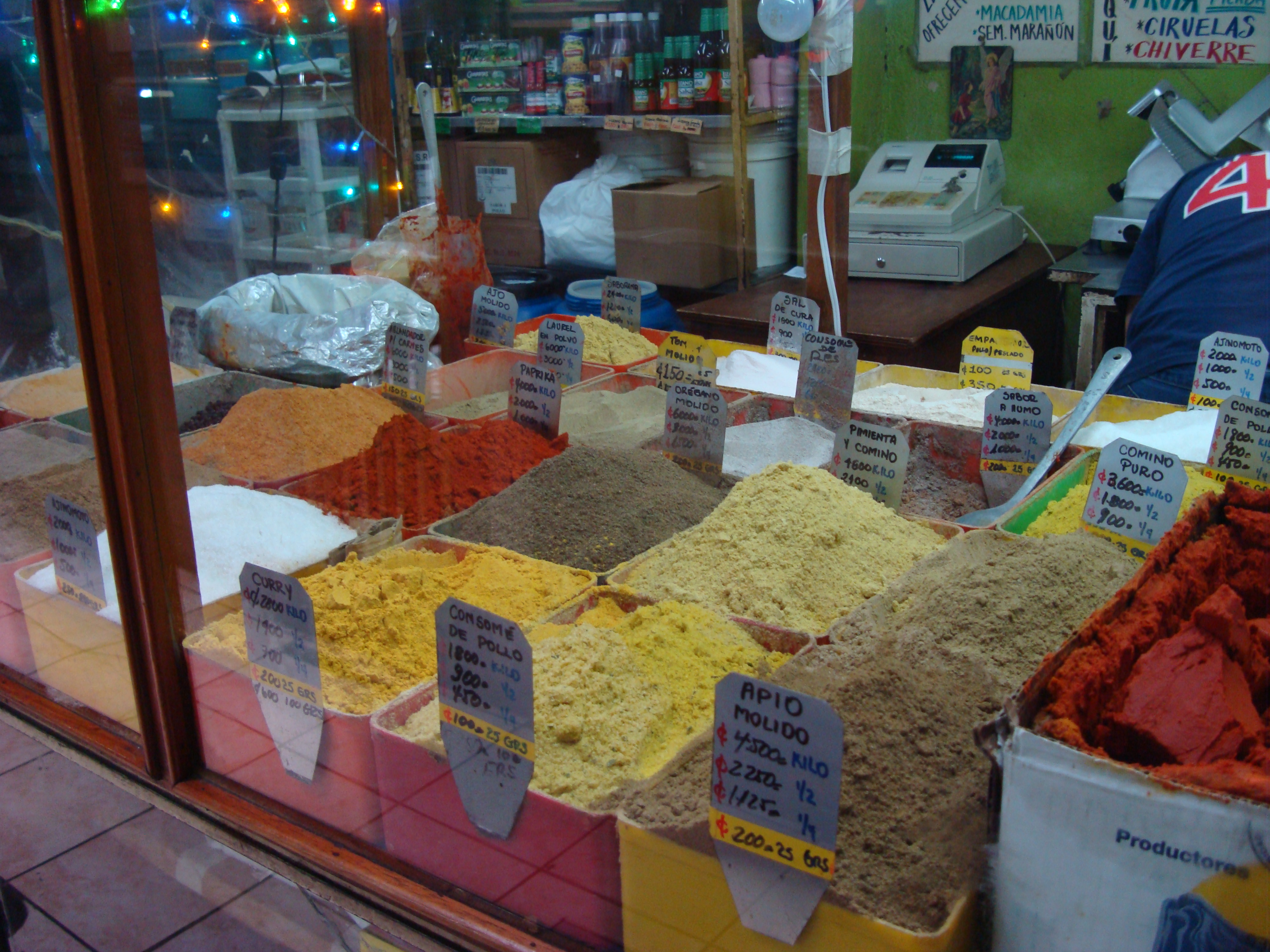
Spices for sale in the Mercado
