= Los Guido =

District of San José Province, Costa Rica

- District
- Interactive map of Los Guido
- Los Guido district location in Costa Rica
- Coordinates: 9.8702661°N 84.0483516°W
- Country: Costa Rica
- Province: San José
- Canton: Desamparados
- Creation: 1 September 2003

Area
  - Total: 3.01 km^{2} (1.16 sq mi)
- Elevation: 1,250 m (4,100 ft)

Population (2011)
  - Total: 24,102
  - Density: 8,010/km^{2} (20,700/sq mi)
- Time zone: UTC−06:00
- Postal code: 10313

Los Guido is a district of the Desamparados canton, in the San José province of Costa Rica.

== History ==
Los Guido was created on 1 September 2003 by Decreto 31380-G .

== Geography ==
Los Guido has an area of 3.01 km^{2} and an elevation of 1,250 metres.

== Demographics ==
Historical population
Census	Pop.	±% p.a.
2011	24,102	—
2022	24,662	+0.21%
Source: Instituto Nacional de Estadística y Censos; Centro Centroamericano de Población

For the 2011 census, Los Guido had a population of 24,102 inhabitants.
