= National Route 204 (Costa Rica) =

National Road Route in Costa Rica

National Secondary Route 204
- Ruta nacional secundaria 204

Route information
- Maintained by Ministry of Public Works and Transport
- Length: 3.095 km (1.923 mi)

Location
- Country: Costa Rica
- Provinces: San José

Highway system
- National Road Network of Costa Rica
← Route 203	→ Route 205

National Secondary Route 204, or just Route 204 (Spanish: Ruta Nacional Secundaria 204, or Ruta 204) is a National Road Route of Costa Rica, located in the San José province.

== Description ==
In San José province the route covers San José canton (Catedral, Zapote, and San Francisco de Dos Ríos districts).
