= San Rafael Abajo =

District in Desamparados canton, San José province, Costa Rica

- District
- San Rafael Abajo district
- San Rafael Abajo district location in Costa Rica
- Coordinates: 9.894338°N 84.0836529°W
- Country: Costa Rica
- Province: San José
- Canton: Desamparados
- Creation: 11 October 1968

Area
  - Total: 2.01 km^{2} (0.78 sq mi)
- Elevation: 1,145 m (3,757 ft)

Population (2011)
  - Total: 23,283
  - Density: 11,600/km^{2} (30,000/sq mi)
- Time zone: UTC−06:00
- Postal code: 10311

San Rafael Abajo is a district of the Desamparados canton, in the San José province of Costa Rica.

== History ==
San Rafael Abajo was created on 11 October 1968 by Ley 34. Segregated from San Rafael Arriba.

== Geography ==
San Rafael Abajo has an area of 2.01 km^{2} and an elevation of 1,145 metres.

== Demographics ==
Historical population
Census	Pop.	±% p.a.
1973	5,757	—
1984	11,555	+6.54%
2000	22,481	+4.25%
2011	23,283	+0.32%
2022	21,408	−0.76%
Source: Instituto Nacional de Estadística y Censos; Centro Centroamericano de Población

For the 2011 census, San Rafael Abajo had a population of 23,283 inhabitants.

== Transportation ==
=== Road transportation ===
The district is covered by the following road routes:

- National Route 105
- National Route 214
- National Route 217
