= National Route 175 (Costa Rica) =

National Road Route in Costa Rica

National Secondary Route 175
- Ruta nacional secundaria 175

Route information
- Maintained by Ministry of Public Works and Transport
- Length: 2.285 km (1.420 mi)

Location
- Country: Costa Rica
- Provinces: San José

Highway system
- National Road Network of Costa Rica
← Route 174	→ Route 176

National Secondary Route 175, or just Route 175 (Spanish: Ruta Nacional Secundaria 175, or Ruta 175) is a National Road Route of Costa Rica located in the San José province.

== Description ==
In San José province the route covers San José canton (Catedral and San Sebastián districts) and Desamparados canton (Desamparados district).
