= National Route 213 (Costa Rica) =

National Road Route in Costa Rica

National Secondary Route 213
- Ruta nacional secundaria 213

Route information
- Maintained by Ministry of Public Works and Transport
- Length: 3.425 km (2.128 mi)

Location
- Country: Costa Rica
- Provinces: San José

Highway system
- National Road Network of Costa Rica
← Route 212	→ Route 214

National Secondary Route 213, or just Route 213 (Spanish: Ruta Nacional Secundaria 213, or Ruta 213) is a National Road Route of Costa Rica, located in the San José province.

== Description ==
In San José province the route covers San José canton (Hospital, Catedral, and San Sebastián districts) and Desamparados canton (Desamparados district).
