= National Route 215 (Costa Rica) =

National Road Route in Costa Rica

National Secondary Route 215
- Ruta nacional secundaria 215

Route information
- Maintained by Ministry of Public Works and Transport
- Length: 6.635 km (4.123 mi)

Location
- Country: Costa Rica
- Provinces: San José

Highway system
- National Road Network of Costa Rica
| ← Route 214 | → Route 216 |

National Secondary Route 215, or just Route 215 (Spanish: Ruta Nacional Secundaria 215, or Ruta 215) is a National Road Route of Costa Rica, located in the San José province.

== Description ==
In San José province the route covers San José canton (Hospital, Catedral, and Zapote districts) and Curridabat canton (Curridabat district).
