= National Route 207 (Costa Rica) =

National Road Route in Costa Rica

National Secondary Route 207
- Ruta nacional secundaria 207

Route information
- Maintained by Ministry of Public Works and Transport
- Length: 1.870 km (1.162 mi)

Location
- Country: Costa Rica
- Provinces: San José

Highway system
- National Road Network of Costa Rica
← Route 206	→ Route 209

National Secondary Route 207, or just Route 207 (Spanish: Ruta Nacional Secundaria 207, or Ruta 207) is a National Road Route of Costa Rica, located in the San José province.

== Description ==
In San José province the route covers San José canton (San Francisco de Dos Ríos district) and Desamparados canton (Desamparados and San Antonio districts).
