= Gravilias =

District in Desamparados canton, San José province, Costa Rica

- District
- Interactive map of Gravilias
- Gravilias district location in Costa Rica
- Coordinates: 9.8859837°N 84.0574794°W
- Country: Costa Rica
- Province: San José
- Canton: Desamparados
- Creation: 23 November 1992

Area
  - Total: 2.94 km^{2} (1.14 sq mi)
- Elevation: 1,150 m (3,770 ft)

Population (2011)
  - Total: 15,024
  - Density: 5,110/km^{2} (13,200/sq mi)
- Time zone: UTC−06:00
- Postal code: 10312

Gravilias is a district of the Desamparados canton, in the San José province of Costa Rica.

== Toponymy ==
The district's name comes from the Grevillea robusta species of tree, widely used to provide shadow to coffee plantations.

== History ==
Gravilias was created on 23 November 1992 by Decreto Ejecutivo 21752-G.

== Geography ==
Gravilias has an area of 2.94 km^{2} and an elevation of 1,150 metres.

== Demographics ==
Historical population
Census	Pop.	±% p.a.
2000	15,846	—
2011	15,024	−0.48%
2022	15,666	+0.38%
Source: Instituto Nacional de Estadística y Censos; Centro Centroamericano de Población

For the 2011 census, Gravilias had a population of 15,024 inhabitants.
