= National Route 304 (Costa Rica) =

National Road Route in Costa Rica

National Tertiary Route 304
- Ruta nacional terciaria 304

Route information
- Maintained by Ministry of Public Works and Transport
- Length: 15.125 km (9.398 mi)

Location
- Country: Costa Rica
- Provinces: San José, Cartago

Highway system
- National Road Network of Costa Rica
← Route 303	→ Route 306

National Tertiary Route 304, or just Route 304 (Spanish: Ruta Nacional Terciaria 304, or Ruta 304) is a National Road Route of Costa Rica, located in the San José, Cartago provinces.

== Description ==
In San José province the route covers Desamparados canton (San Miguel, Rosario districts), Aserrí canton (Salitrillos district).

In Cartago province the route covers Cartago canton (Corralillo district).
