= National Route 212 (Costa Rica) =

National Road Route in Costa Rica

National Secondary Route 212
- Ruta nacional secundaria 212

Route information
- Maintained by Ministry of Public Works and Transport
- Length: 4.715 km (2.930 mi)

Location
- Country: Costa Rica
- Provinces: San José

Highway system
- National Road Network of Costa Rica
← Route 211	→ Route 213

National Secondary Route 212, or just Route 212 (Spanish: Ruta Nacional Secundaria 212, or Ruta 212) is a National Road Route of Costa Rica, located in the San José province.

== Description ==
In San José province the route covers Desamparados canton (San Antonio, Patarrá, and Damas districts).
