= San Antonio District, Desamparados =

District in Desamparados canton, San José province, Costa Rica

San Antonio
- District
- San Antonio district
- San Antonio district location in Costa Rica
- Coordinates: 9.898993°N 84.0470021°W
- Country: Costa Rica
- Province: San José
- Canton: Desamparados

Area
  - Total: 2.1 km^{2} (0.81 sq mi)
- Elevation: 1,163 m (3,816 ft)

Population (2011)
  - Total: 9,727
  - Density: 4,600/km^{2} (12,000/sq mi)
- Time zone: UTC−06:00
- Postal code: 10305

San Antonio is a district of the Desamparados canton, in the San José province of Costa Rica.

== Geography ==
San Antonio has an area of 2.1 km^{2} and an elevation of 1,163 metres.

== Demographics ==
Historical population
Census	Pop.	±% p.a.
1883	973	—
1892	802	−2.12%
1927	893	+0.31%
1950	1,245	+1.46%
1963	2,735	+6.24%
1973	5,147	+6.53%
1984	7,519	+3.51%
2000	9,775	+1.65%
2011	9,727	−0.04%
2022	9,360	−0.35%
Source: Instituto Nacional de Estadística y Censos; Centro Centroamericano de Población

For the 2011 census, San Antonio had a population of 9,727 inhabitants.

== Transportation ==
=== Road transportation ===
The district is covered by the following road routes:

- National Route 207
- National Route 210
- National Route 212
- National Route 409
