= National Route 174 (Costa Rica) =

National Road Route in Costa Rica

National Secondary Route 174
- Ruta nacional secundaria 174

Route information
- Maintained by Ministry of Public Works and Transport
- Length: 1.130 km (0.702 mi)

Location
- Country: Costa Rica
- Provinces: San José

Highway system
- National Road Network of Costa Rica
← Route 171	→ Route 175

National Secondary Route 174, or just Route 174 (Spanish: Ruta Nacional Secundaria 174, or Ruta 174) is a National Road Route of Costa Rica located in the San José province.

== Description ==
In San José province the route covers San José canton (Pavas district).
