= National Route 206 (Costa Rica) =

National Road Route in Costa Rica

National Secondary Route 206
- Ruta nacional secundaria 206

Route information
- Maintained by Ministry of Public Works and Transport
- Length: 10.790 km (6.705 mi)

Location
- Country: Costa Rica
- Provinces: San José, Cartago

Highway system
- National Road Network of Costa Rica
← Route 205	→ Route 207

National Secondary Route 206, or just Route 206 (Spanish: Ruta Nacional Secundaria 206, or Ruta 206) is a National Road Route of Costa Rica, located in the San José, Cartago provinces.

== Description ==
In San José province the route covers Desamparados canton (Desamparados and San Miguel districts).

In Cartago province the route covers Cartago canton (Quebradilla district).
