= National Route 214 (Costa Rica) =

National Road Route in Costa Rica

National Secondary Route 214
- Ruta nacional secundaria 214

Route information
- Maintained by Ministry of Public Works and Transport
- Length: 6.855 km (4.259 mi)

Location
- Country: Costa Rica
- Provinces: San José

Highway system
- National Road Network of Costa Rica
← Route 213	→ Route 215

National Secondary Route 214, or just Route 214 (Spanish: Ruta Nacional Secundaria 214, or Ruta 214) is a National Road Route of Costa Rica, located in the San José province.

== Description ==
In San José province the route covers San José canton (Hospital and San Sebastián districts) and Desamparados canton (San Rafael Arriba and San Rafael Abajo districts).
