= San Juan de Dios District =

District in Desamparados canton, San José province, Costa Rica

San Juan de Dios
- District
- San Juan de Dios district
- San Juan de Dios district location in Costa Rica
- Coordinates: 9.8800094°N 84.0913959°W
- Country: Costa Rica
- Province: San José
- Canton: Desamparados

Area
  - Total: 2.98 km^{2} (1.15 sq mi)
- Elevation: 1,190 m (3,900 ft)

Population (2011)
  - Total: 19,481
  - Density: 6,540/km^{2} (16,900/sq mi)
- Time zone: UTC−06:00
- Postal code: 10303

San Juan de Dios is a district of the Desamparados canton, in the San José province of Costa Rica.

== Geography ==
San Juan de Dios has an area of 2.98 km^{2} and an elevation of 1,190 metres.

== Demographics ==
Historical population
Census	Pop.	±% p.a.
1864	718	—
1883	838	+0.82%
1892	998	+1.96%
1927	1,034	+0.10%
1950	1,276	+0.92%
1963	2,836	+6.34%
1973	6,465	+8.59%
1984	9,540	+3.60%
2000	16,577	+3.51%
2011	19,481	+1.48%
2022	19,583	+0.05%
Source: Instituto Nacional de Estadística y Censos; Centro Centroamericano de Población

For the 2011 census, San Juan de Dios had a population of 19,481 inhabitants.

== Transportation ==
=== Road transportation ===
The district is covered by the following road routes:

- National Route 217
