= Hospital (district) =

District in San José canton, San José province, Costa Rica

- District
- Interactive map of Hospital
- Hospital district location in Costa Rica
- Coordinates: 9.9265555°N 84.0890355°W
- Country: Costa Rica
- Province: San José
- Canton: San José

Area
  - Total: 3.3 km^{2} (1.3 sq mi)
- Elevation: 1,160 m (3,810 ft)

Population (2011)
  - Total: 19,270
  - Density: 5,800/km^{2} (15,000/sq mi)
- Time zone: UTC−06:00
- Postal code: 10103

Hospital is a district of the San José canton, in the San José province of Costa Rica. It is one of the four administrative units that form San José downtown properly. The district houses, along with Merced district, the main commercial activity of the city, and is the most populous of the four central districts.

== Geography ==
Hospital has an area of 3.3 km^{2} and an elevation of 1160 metres.

It lies in the center of the canton, the only one which limits with districts of San José and not with other cantons. The district borders (clockwards) with Merced district to the north, El Carmen and Catedral districts to the east, San Sebastián and Hatillo districts to the south, and Mata Redonda district to the west.

== Demographics ==
Historical population
Census	Pop.	±% p.a.
1883	4,301	—
1892	6,032	+3.83%
1927	18,604	+3.27%
1950	33,858	+2.64%
1963	38,361	+0.97%
1973	34,689	−1.00%
1984	27,097	−2.22%
2000	24,175	−0.71%
2011	19,270	−2.04%
2022	25,619	+2.62%
Source: Instituto Nacional de Estadística y Censos; Centro Centroamericano de Población

For the 2011 census, Hospital had a population of 19270 inhabitants.

== Locations ==
This district comprehend several "barrios" or neighbourhoods, like Almendares, Ángeles, Bolívar, Cant, Colón (part of it), La Merced, Pacífico (part of it), Pinos, Salubridad, San Bosco, San Francisco, Santa Lucía and Silos. Between its boundaries there is a lot of important institutions and buildings, from government, health and culture of the country.

- Parque Central de San José.
- Hospital San Juan de Dios. One of the three main hospitals of the country.
- Hospital de Niños. Hospital specialized in infants.
- Teatro Popular Melico Salazar. The second most important theater in the country, after Costa Rica's National Theater.

=== Road transportation ===
The district is covered by the following road routes:

- National Route 1
- National Route 2
- National Route 27
- National Route 110
- National Route 167
- National Route 176
- National Route 213
- National Route 214
- National Route 215
