= Desamparados =

District in Desamparados canton, San José province, Costa Rica

- District
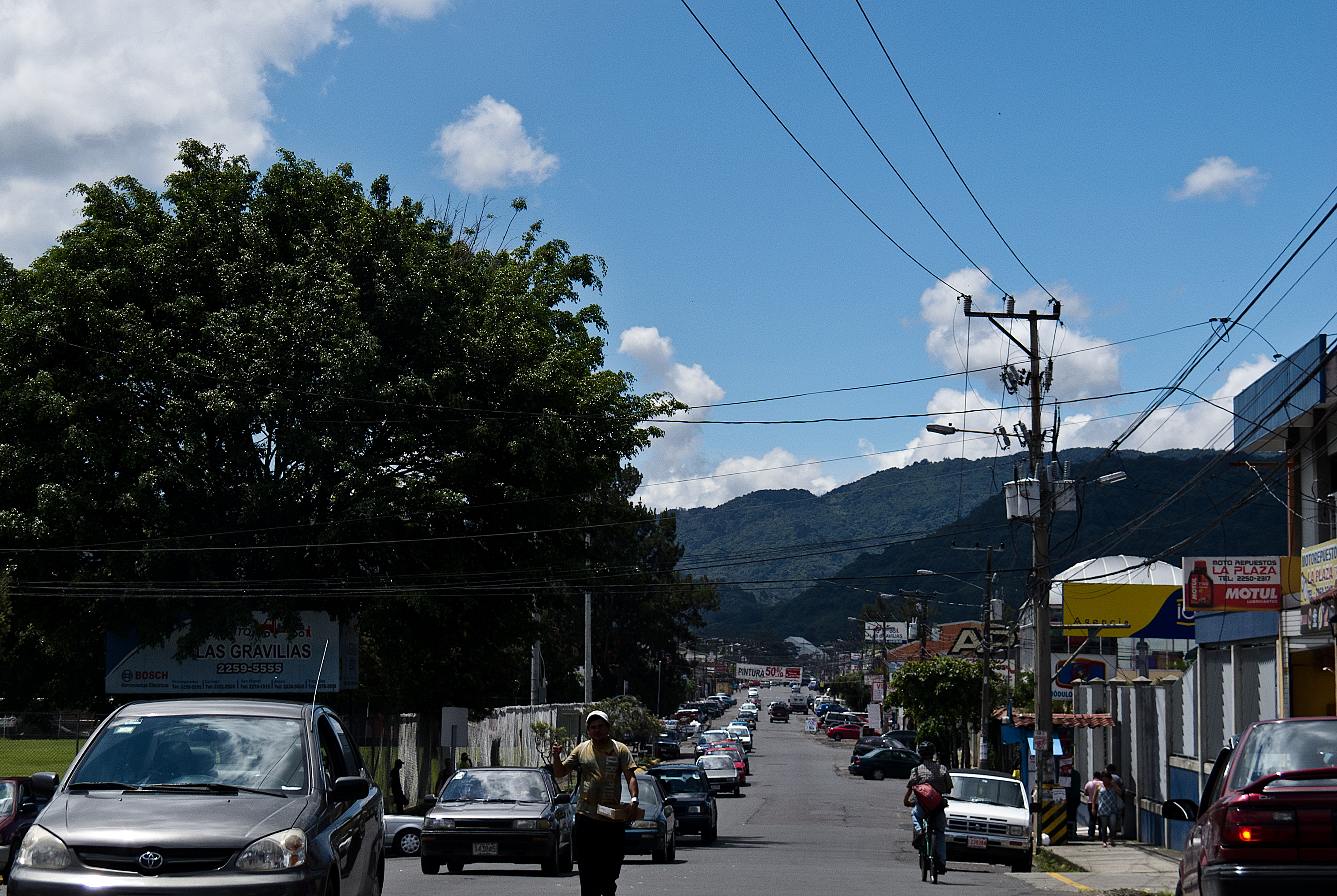
- One of the main streets in downtown Desamparados
- Interactive map of Desamparados
- Desamparados district location in Costa Rica
- Coordinates: 9.8966632°N 84.0706388°W
- Country: Costa Rica
- Province: San José
- Canton: Desamparados

Area
  - Total: 3.31 km^{2} (1.28 sq mi)
- Elevation: 1,161 m (3,809 ft)

Population (2011)
  - Total: 33,866
  - Density: 10,200/km^{2} (26,500/sq mi)
- Time zone: UTC−06:00
- Postal code: 10301

Desamparados is a district of the Desamparados canton, in the San José province of Costa Rica.

== Geography ==
Desamparados has an area of 3.31 km^{2} and an elevation of 1,161 metres.

== Demographics ==
Historical population
Census	Pop.	±% p.a.
1864	965	—
1883	969	+0.02%
1892	1,207	+2.47%
1927	1,502	+0.63%
1950	4,064	+4.42%
1963	11,511	+8.34%
1973	30,659	+10.29%
1984	43,352	+3.20%
2000	36,437	−1.08%
2011	33,866	−0.66%
2022	31,783	−0.58%
Source: Instituto Nacional de Estadística y Censos; Centro Centroamericano de Población

For the 2011 census, Desamparados had a population of 33,866 inhabitants.

== Transportation ==
=== Road transportation ===
The district is covered by the following road routes:

- National Route 175
- National Route 206
- National Route 207
- National Route 209
- National Route 213
