= San Miguel District, Desamparados =

District in Desamparados canton, San José province, Costa Rica

San Miguel
- District
- San Miguel district
- San Miguel district location in Costa Rica
- Coordinates: 9.8476189°N 84.0480149°W
- Country: Costa Rica
- Province: San José
- Canton: Desamparados

Area
  - Total: 21.36 km^{2} (8.25 sq mi)
- Elevation: 1,230 m (4,040 ft)

Population (2011)
  - Total: 31,805
  - Density: 1,489/km^{2} (3,856/sq mi)
- Time zone: UTC−06:00
- Postal code: 10302

San Miguel is a district of the Desamparados canton, in the San José province of Costa Rica.

== Geography ==
San Miguel has an area of 21.36 km^{2} and an elevation of 1,230 metres.

== Demographics ==
Historical population
Census	Pop.	±% p.a.
1864	667	—
1883	898	+1.58%
1892	994	+1.13%
1927	2,227	+2.33%
1950	2,523	+0.54%
1963	4,569	+4.67%
1973	8,171	+5.99%
1984	12,053	+3.60%
2000	28,336	+5.49%
2011	31,805	+1.06%
2022	38,194	+1.68%
Source: Instituto Nacional de Estadística y Censos; Centro Centroamericano de Población

For the 2011 census, San Miguel had a population of 31,805 inhabitants.

== Transportation ==
=== Road transportation ===
The district is covered by the following road routes:

- National Route 206
- National Route 304
