= San José, Costa Rica =

Capital and largest city of Costa Rica

San José
- Capital city
- Ciudad de San José de Costa Rica
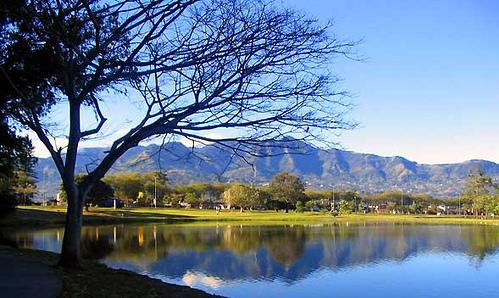
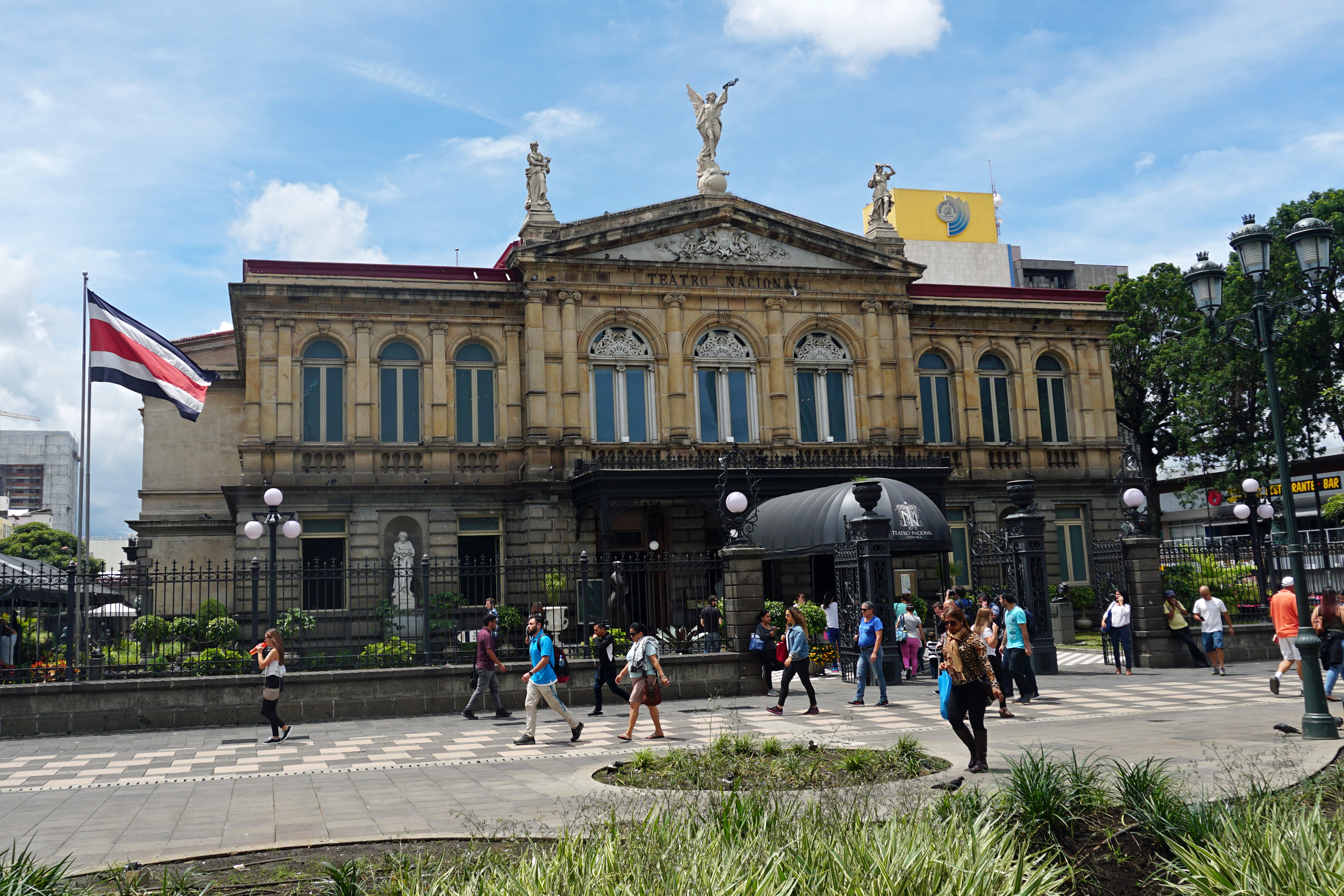
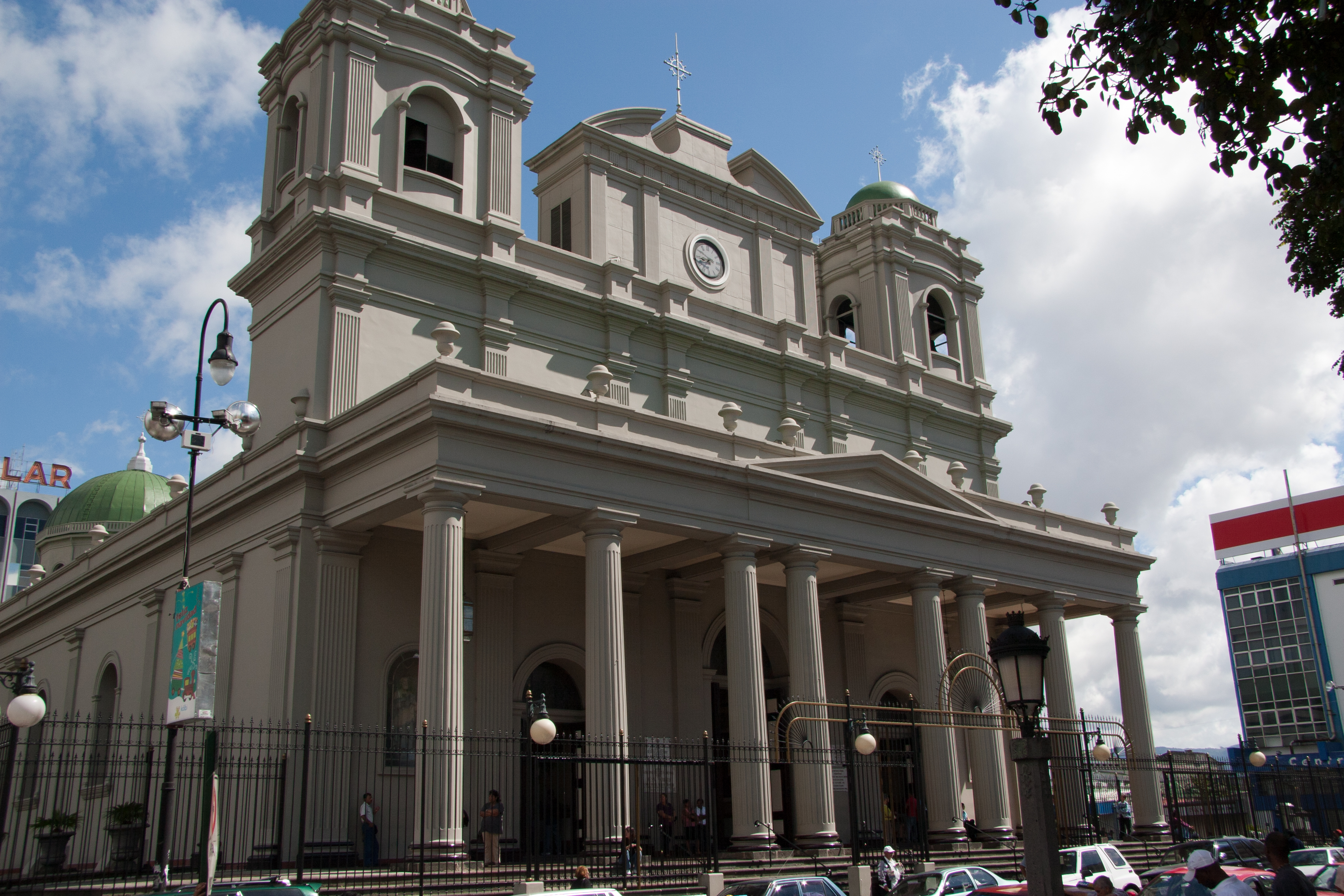
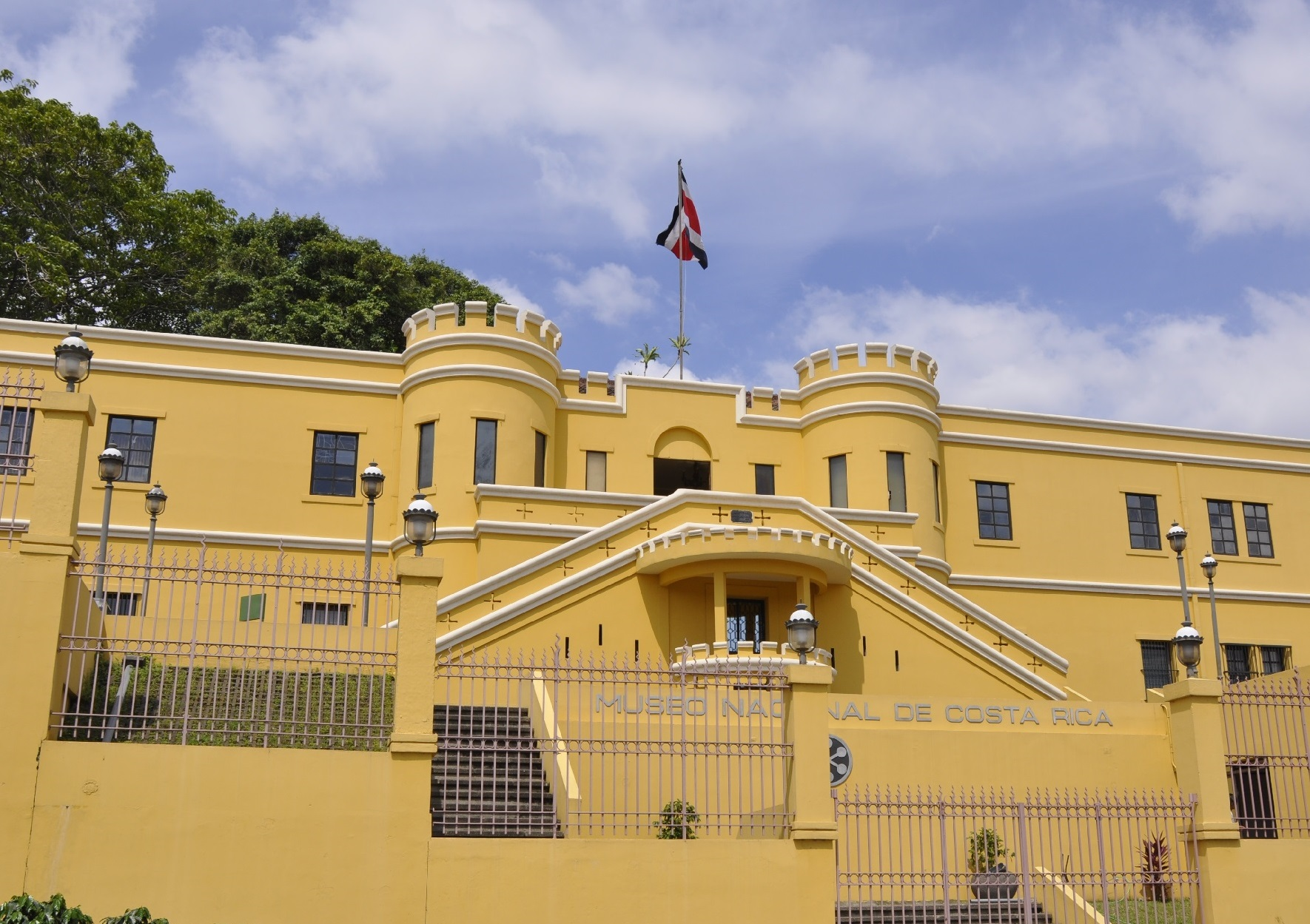
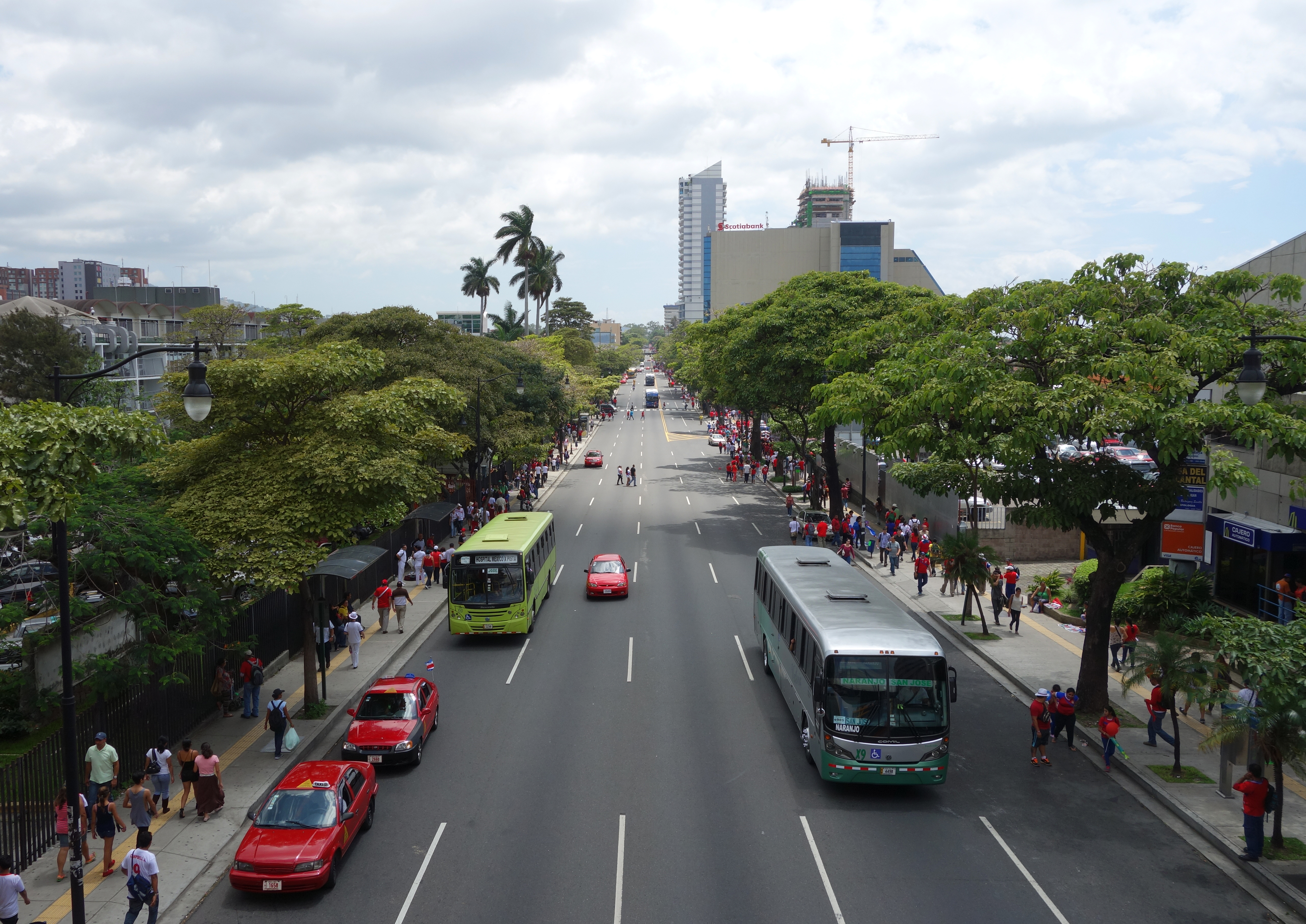
- Panorama of San José La Sabana Metropolitan Park National Museum of Costa Rica National Theatre of Costa Rica Metropolitan Cathedral of San José Entrance to the National Museum of Costa Rica Paseo Colón

- Flag Coat of arms Wordmark
- Nickname: Chepe ("Joe")
- Motto: Ad Meliora (Latin) "Towards better things"
- Borders of San José city within San José canton, where East sector of Uruca district is excluded.

- Location within Costa Rica Location within Central America Location within North America
- Coordinates: 09°55′57″N 84°04′48″W
- Country: Costa Rica
- Province: San José
- Founded: c. 1739
- Capital as of: 16 May 1823
- Districts: 10 total, 1 partial.

Government
  - Mayor: Diego Miranda Méndez (PJSJ)

Area
  - Capital city: 44.62 km^{2} (17.23 sq mi)
  - Metro: 2,044 km^{2} (789 sq mi)
- Elevation: 1,030 m (3,380 ft)

Population (2022)
  - Capital city: 352,381
  - Rank: 1st in Costa Rica
  - Density: 7,897/km^{2} (20,450/sq mi)
  - Urban: 2,171,213
  - Metro: 3,160,000
  - Metro density: 1,056.2/km^{2} (2,736/sq mi)
  - Demonym: Josefino/a

GDP (PPP, constant 2015 values)
  - Year: 2023
  - Metro: $30.2 billion
  - Per capita: $20,700
- Time zone: UTC-06:00 (CST)
- Area code: + 506
- HDI (2019): 0.828; Very High
- Climate: Aw
- Website: msj.go.cr

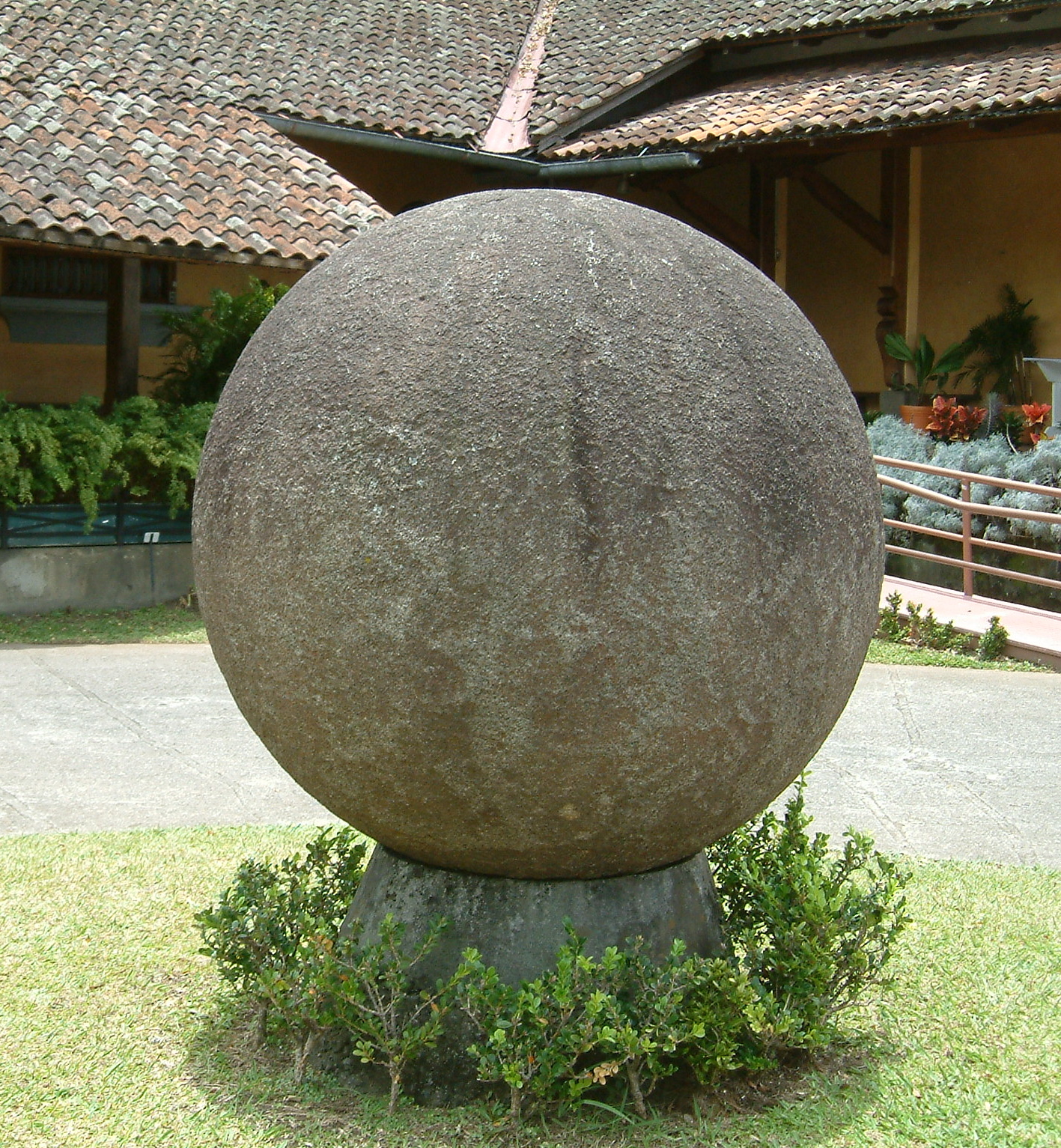
Stone sphere created by the Diquis culture in the courtyard of the National Museum of Costa Rica. The spheres are part of the country's cultural identity

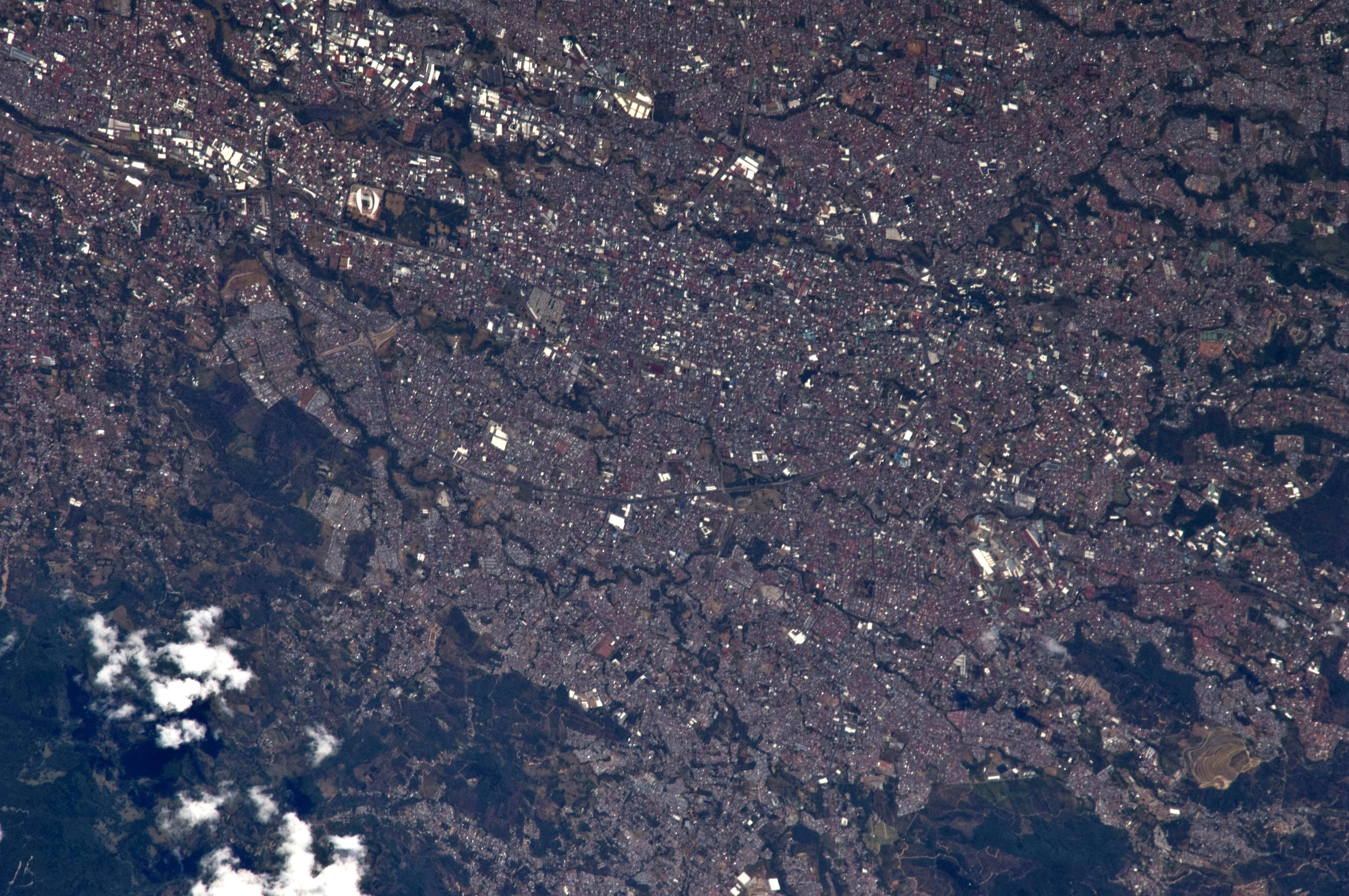
San José viewed from the International Space Station

San José’s skyline with the iconic Costa Rica National Stadium (2011) and the Leumi/CLS Business Center, one of the biggest buildings in Central America

San José (Spanish: [saŋ xoˈse]; meaning "Saint Joseph") is the capital and largest city of Costa Rica, and the capital of San José Province. It is in the center of the country, in the mid-west of the Central Valley. San José is Costa Rica's seat of national government, focal point of political and economic activity, and major transport hub. San José is simultaneously one of Costa Rica's cantons, with its municipal land area covering 44.62 square kilometers (17.23 square miles) and having within it an estimated population of 352,381 people in 2022. Together with several other cantons of the central valley, including Alajuela, Heredia and Cartago, it forms the country's Greater Metropolitan Area, with an estimated population of over 2 million in 2017. The city is named in honor of Joseph of Nazareth.

Founded in 1736 by order of Cabildo de León, the population of San José rose during the 18th century through the use of colonial planning. It has historically been a city of strategic importance, having been the capital of Costa Rica three times. More than a million people pass through it daily. It is home to the Museo Nacional de Costa Rica, the National Theater of Costa Rica, and La Sabana Metropolitan Park. Juan Santamaría International Airport serves the city.

San José is notable among Latin American cities for its high quality of life, security, level of globalization, environmental performance, public service, and recognized institutions. In 2012, San José was one of the safest and least violent cities in the region. It is considered a "Beta-" global city by GaWC. San José joined the UNESCO Global Network of Learning Cities in 2016 and is also recognized as a "Design City" by UNESCO.

== History ==
The population of San José grew during the eighteenth-century colonization planning, which was different from the traditional foundation plans of Spanish cities in Central America.

Founded in 1736 by order of Cabildo de León, its objective was to concentrate the scattered inhabitants of the Aserrí Valley. De León thus ordered the construction of a chapel near the area known as La Boca del Monte which was completed a year later. That year St. Joseph was chosen as parish patron, hence its name. The chapel, which was very modest, was erected with help from the church of Cartago.

Unlike neighboring Cartago, San José was not founded by formal decree and thus lacked a city government. It was not until the enactment of the Constitution of Cádiz in 1812 that San José had its first city government. On 18 October 1813, the area was first defined as a city by presbyter Florencio del Castillo, on behalf of the Spanish government, a title which was then lost in 1814 when Ferdinand VII of Spain annulled the proceedings of the courts. The municipal government was restored in 1820 along with the title of city and in 1823 San José became the capital of Costa Rica. This makes San José one of the youngest capital cities in Latin America by year of conception.

Population and economic growth were spurred by improvements in access to water and the installment of the Tobacco Factory in 1782. The accumulation of capital brought by tobacco plantations allowed the city to economically surpass neighboring provinces.

The first modern urban neighborhood carries the name of its founder, the French coffee entrepreneur Monsieur Amon, and was created in the late 19th century, in line with Belle Époque contemporary architecture. Barrio Amon, as well as the National Theater, remain symbols of the so-called Costa Rican coffee golden age.

Today San José is a modern city with commerce, art and architecture. Spurred by the country's tourism industry, it is a destination and stopover for foreign visitors.

San José exerts a strong influence because of its proximity to other cities (Alajuela, Heredia and Cartago) and the country's demographic assemblage in the Central Valley.

== Districts ==
The borders of San José city, as defined in the Administrative Territorial Division and stipulated in the Executive Decree 11562 of 27 May 1980, assign the borders of San José canton except an East sector of Uruca district. Therefore the city is composed of the totality of the districts of Carmen, Merced, Hospital, Catedral, Zapote, San Francisco de Dos Ríos, Mata Redonda, Pavas, Hatillo, San Sebastián and partially of Uruca district.

== Demographics ==
Historical population
| Census | Pop. | ±% p.a. |
|---|---|---|
| 2011 | 288,054 | — |
Source: Instituto Nacional de Estadística y Censos; Centro Centroamericano de Población

For the 2022 population estimate, San José had a population of 352,381 inhabitants, more than any other canton in the country and up from 288,054 people, according the 2011 census. The canton has a population density of 7,897.4/km^{2}.

Most of the population is distributed in the peripheral districts around the downtown. The districts of El Carmen, Merced, Hospital, and Catedral are known as casco central, similar to a downtown or financial center, and only 18% of the canton population inhabits these districts.

In 2022, the canton had 0.92 men per woman, a small change from 0.90 men per woman in 2011. In 2000, the province had 100% of urban population. 17.33% of its inhabitants are under ten, and 7.67% are over 65.

== Government ==
=== Mayor ===
According to Costa Rica's Municipal Code, mayors are elected every four years by the population of the canton. As of the latest municipal elections in 2024, the Together San José candidate, Luis Diego Miranda Méndez, was elected mayor of the canton with 23.95% of the votes, with Yariela Franciny Quirós Álvarez and Fernando Antonio Vega Guillén as first and second vice mayors, respectively.

Mayors since the 2002 elections
| Period | Name | Party |
|---|---|---|
| 2002–2006 | Johnny Francisco Araya Monge | PLN |
| 2006–2010 | Johnny Francisco Araya Monge | PLN |
| 2010–2016 | Johnny Francisco Araya Monge | PLN |
| 2016–2020 | Johnny Francisco Araya Monge | PASJ |
| 2020–2024 | Johnny Francisco Araya Monge | PLN |
| 2024–2028 | Luis Diego Miranda Méndez | PJSJ |

=== Municipal Council ===
Like the mayor and vice mayors, members of the Municipal Council (called regidores) are elected every four years. San José's Municipal Council has 11 seats for regidores and their substitutes, who can participate in meetings but not vote unless the owning regidor (regidor propietario) is absent. The current president of the Municipal Council is Together San José Party member, Mariana de los Ángeles Zúñiga Pérez, with the regidor for More San José Party, Juan Diego Gómez González, as vice president. The Municipal Council's composition for the 2024-2028 period is as follows:

Current composition of the Municipal Council of San José after the 2024 municipal elections
Political parties in the Municipal Council of San José
| Political party | Regidores | | |
| Political party | № | Owner | Substitute |
|---|---|---|---|
| Together San José (PJSJ) | 3 | Mariana de los Ángeles Zúñiga Pérez^{(P)} | María Andrea Rudín Montes de Oca |
| Together San José (PJSJ) | 3 | Rafael Ángel González Ovares | Gregory Manuel Garro Jiménez |
| Together San José (PJSJ) | 3 | María Bernardita Fallas Vargas | Isabel Rosemary Mesen Salazar |
| National Liberation Party (PLN) | 3 | Ulises Alexander Cano Castro | Rafael Ángel Ramírez Badilla |
| National Liberation Party (PLN) | 3 | Iztaru Alfaro Guerrero | Olga Dinia Pérez Bonilla |
| National Liberation Party (PLN) | 3 | Rolando Luis Murillo Cruz | Carlos Estefano Castillo Arias |
| Social Christian Unity Party (PUSC) | 1 | Álvaro Salas Carvajal | Alexander Vega Garro |
| Broad Front (FA) | 1 | Yorleny Karina Córdoba Moya | David Contreras Mora |
| Social Democratic Progress Party (PSD) | 1 | Ricardo Antonio Arce Díaz | Jazmín del Carmen Pineda León |
| More San José (PMAS) | 1 | Juan Diego Gómez González^{(VP)} | Greivin Chaves Quesada |
| Progressive Liberal Party (PLP) | 1 | José Manuel Jiménez Gómez | Marco Tulio Ramírez Chan |

== Climate ==
San José has a tropical wet and dry climate (Köppen climate classification Aw). Precipitation varies widely between the driest month (6.3 mm (0.25 in)) and the wettest month (355.1 mm (13.98 in)), while average temperatures vary little. The hottest month is April with an average temperature of 23.7 °C (74.7 °F), while the coolest month is October with an average temperature of 21.8 °C (71.2 °F).

Climate data for San José (Juan Santamaría International Airport)
| Month | Jan | Feb | Mar | Apr | May | Jun | Jul | Aug | Sep | Oct | Nov | Dec | Year |
|---|---|---|---|---|---|---|---|---|---|---|---|---|---|
| Record high °C (°F) | 31.5 (88.7) | 33.3 (91.9) | 33.4 (92.1) | 34.5 (94.1) | 33.3 (91.9) | 32.1 (89.8) | 31.7 (89.1) | 32.0 (89.6) | 32.0 (89.6) | 31.4 (88.5) | 30.9 (87.6) | 31.7 (89.1) | 34.5 (94.1) |
| Mean daily maximum °C (°F) | 28.2 (82.8) | 29.1 (84.4) | 29.9 (85.8) | 30.3 (86.5) | 28.8 (83.8) | 28.2 (82.8) | 28.2 (82.8) | 28.3 (82.9) | 27.8 (82.0) | 27.1 (80.8) | 27.2 (81.0) | 27.9 (82.2) | 28.4 (83.1) |
| Daily mean °C (°F) | 22.6 (72.7) | 23.0 (73.4) | 23.5 (74.3) | 23.7 (74.7) | 22.9 (73.2) | 22.5 (72.5) | 22.6 (72.7) | 22.4 (72.3) | 22.0 (71.6) | 21.8 (71.2) | 21.9 (71.4) | 22.3 (72.1) | 22.6 (72.7) |
| Mean daily minimum °C (°F) | 18.5 (65.3) | 18.7 (65.7) | 18.8 (65.8) | 19.1 (66.4) | 19.2 (66.6) | 19.0 (66.2) | 19.0 (66.2) | 18.8 (65.8) | 18.3 (64.9) | 18.5 (65.3) | 18.3 (64.9) | 18.3 (64.9) | 18.7 (65.7) |
| Record low °C (°F) | 11.7 (53.1) | 13.2 (55.8) | 14.5 (58.1) | 14.9 (58.8) | 14.4 (57.9) | 15.8 (60.4) | 15.2 (59.4) | 16.0 (60.8) | 15.8 (60.4) | 15.3 (59.5) | 14.5 (58.1) | 14.2 (57.6) | 11.7 (53.1) |
| Average rainfall mm (inches) | 6.3 (0.25) | 10.2 (0.40) | 13.8 (0.54) | 79.9 (3.15) | 267.6 (10.54) | 280.1 (11.03) | 181.5 (7.15) | 276.9 (10.90) | 355.1 (13.98) | 330.6 (13.02) | 135.5 (5.33) | 33.5 (1.32) | 1,971 (77.61) |
| Average rainy days (≥ 0.1 mm) | 3 | 3 | 5 | 10 | 23 | 22 | 20 | 22 | 26 | 25 | 17 | 8 | 184 |
| Average relative humidity (%) | 68 | 68 | 66 | 70 | 77 | 83 | 80 | 83 | 85 | 87 | 79 | 74 | 77 |
| Mean monthly sunshine hours | 285.2 | 266.0 | 282.1 | 240.0 | 182.9 | 144.0 | 151.9 | 158.1 | 147.0 | 161.2 | 177.0 | 244.9 | 2,440.3 |
| Mean daily daylight hours | 11.6 | 11.8 | 12.1 | 12.4 | 12.6 | 12.7 | 12.6 | 12.4 | 12.2 | 11.9 | 11.7 | 11.6 | 12.1 |
| Percentage possible sunshine | 79 | 80 | 75 | 65 | 47 | 38 | 39 | 41 | 40 | 44 | 50 | 68 | 56 |
Source 1: Deutscher Wetterdienst
Source 2: NOAA (sun 1961–1990) Weather Spark

== Education ==
Costa Rica has developed high education levels. As of 2011 97.6% of the population over 10 was literate, 96% of children aged 6–11 attend primary school and 71% of students of high-school age attend high-school. The country as a whole has the highest education levels in Central America and one of the best in Latin America. This is especially true for San José, the nation's educational hub home to a large number of public and private universities.

University of Santo Tomas, the first university of Costa Rica, was established in San José in 1843. It maintained close ties with the Roman Catholic Church and was closed in 1888 by the progressive and anti-clerical government of President Bernardo Soto Alfaro as part of a campaign to modernize public education. The schools of law, agronomy, fine arts, and pharmacy continued to operate independently, but Costa Rica had no university proper until 1940, when those four schools were re-united to establish the modern University of Costa Rica (UCR), during the reformist administration of President Rafael Ángel Calderón Guardia. The University for Peace, an intergovernmental organization with university status, established by the United Nations General Assembly in 1980, is located in San José.

The city's public education system is composed of pre-schools, elementary and high schools (from grades 7 to 11), which are located in all of the city's districts and are under the supervision of the Ministry of Public Education. Nevertheless, private institutions do exist within the city. These educational institutions range from pre-schools to universities. Most tend to be bilingual, teaching subjects in either French or English and Spanish, among other languages, apart from just teaching a certain language.

== Security ==
San José is one of Latin America's safest cities. As of 19 June 2012, both city and nation reduced their crime indices considerably. Nationwide, crime was reduced from 12.5 to 9.5 incidents per 100,000 inhabitants.

In 2012, new police equipment was issued by the government, and the security budget was increased. President Laura Chinchilla's government donated vehicles and other equipment to the police department on at least two occasions.

The city's greater metropolitan area (in Los Yoses, San Pedro) also serves as the headquarters of the Inter-American Court of Human Rights.

== Major landmarks ==
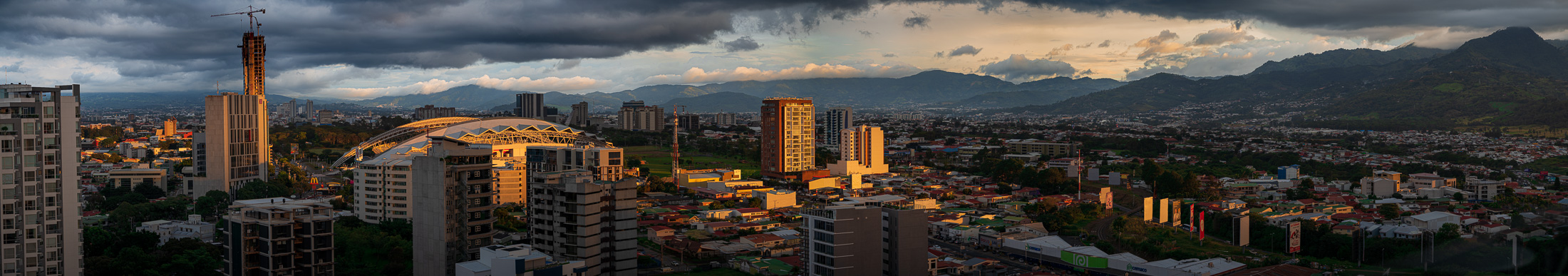
San José skyline with mountains in the background

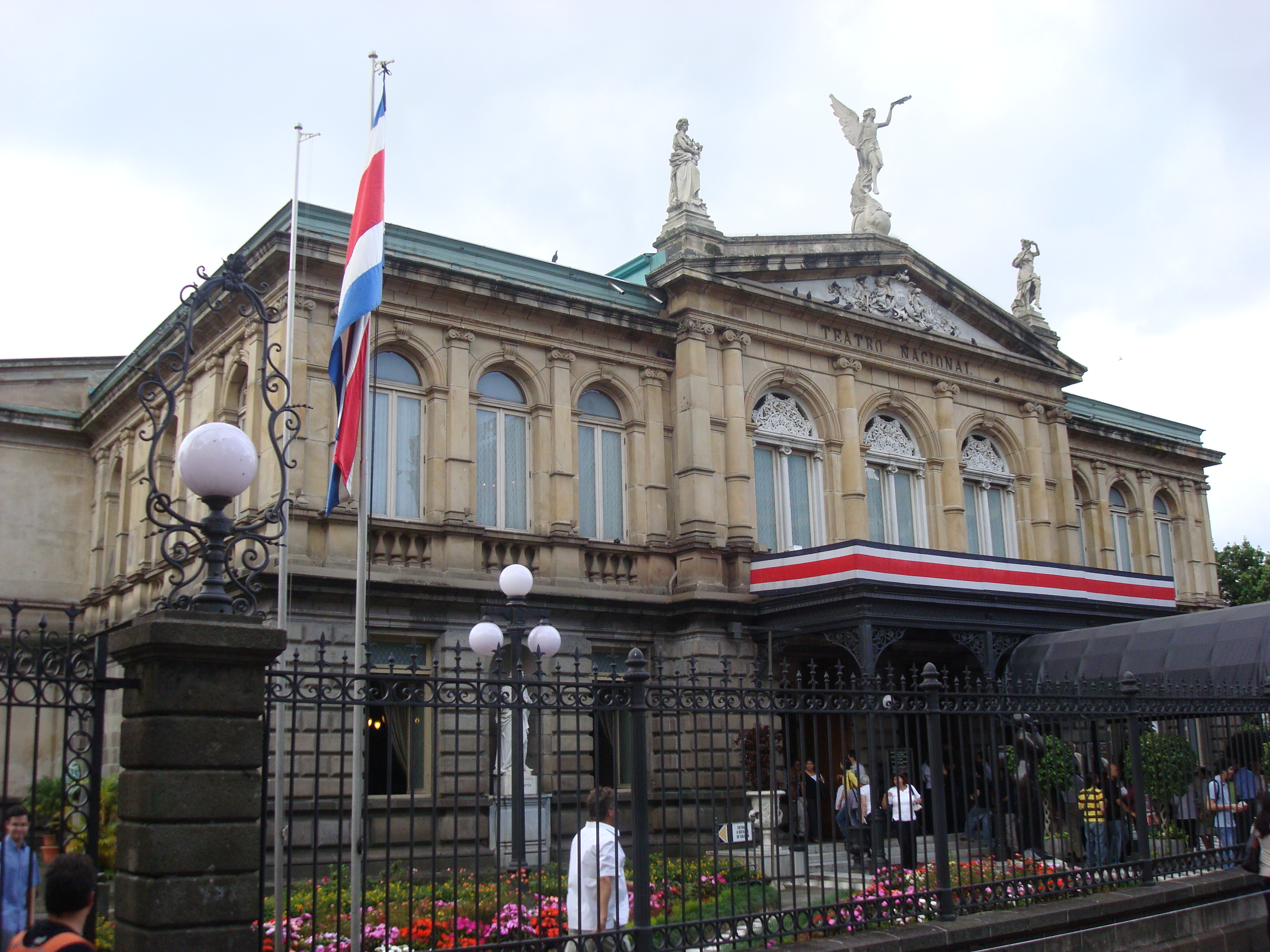
National Theater

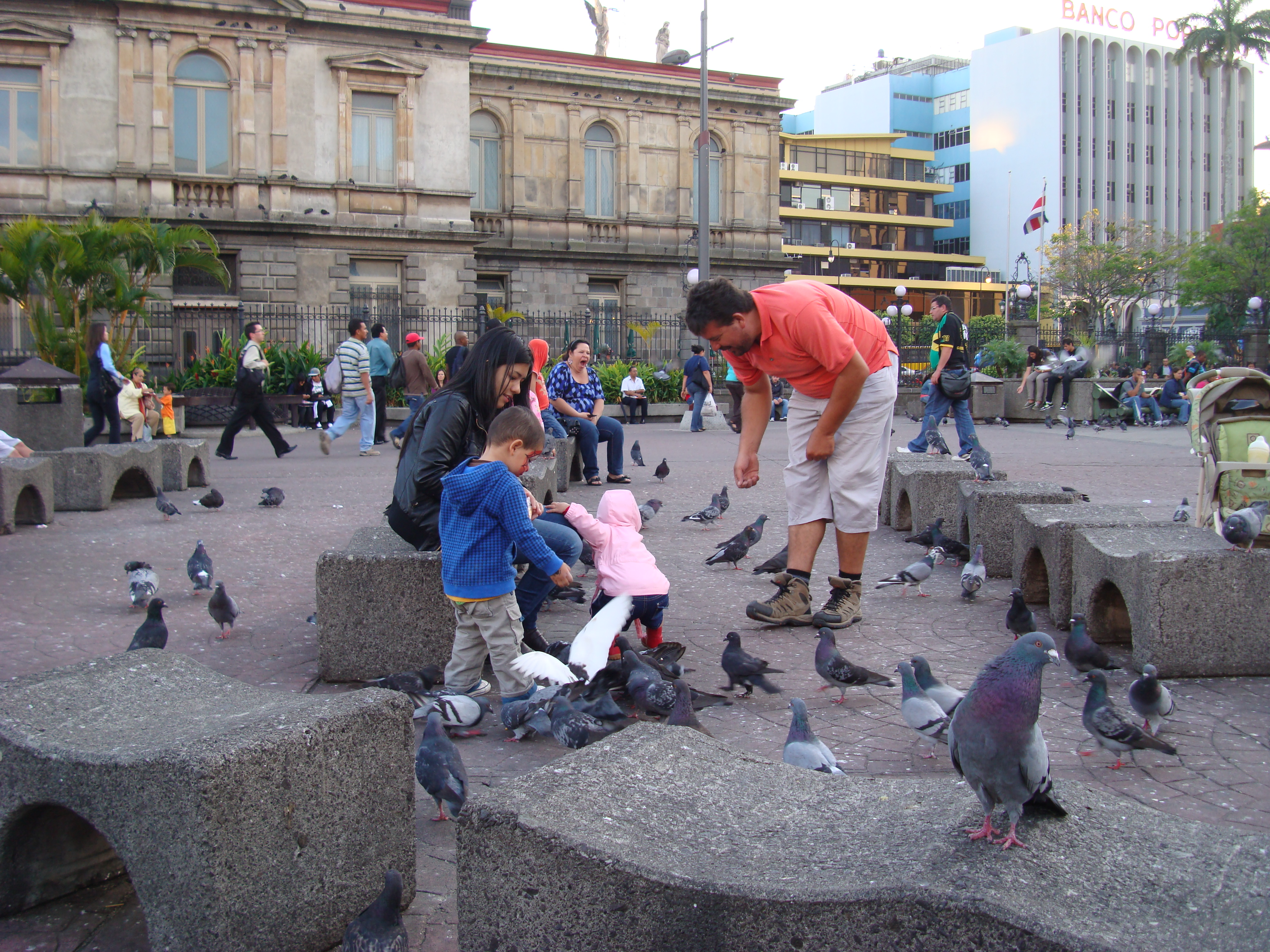
Plaza de la Cultura

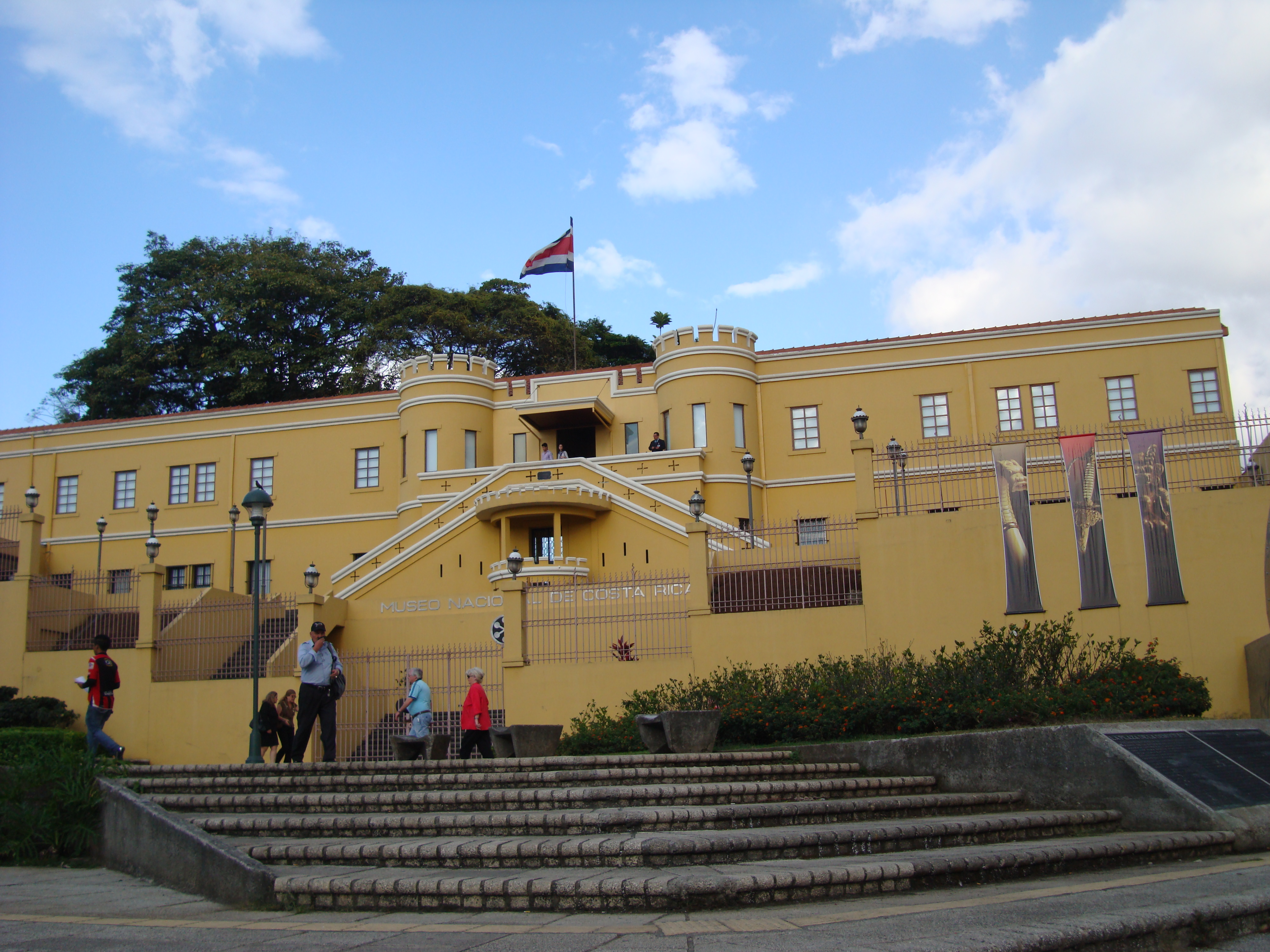
National Museum of Costa Rica

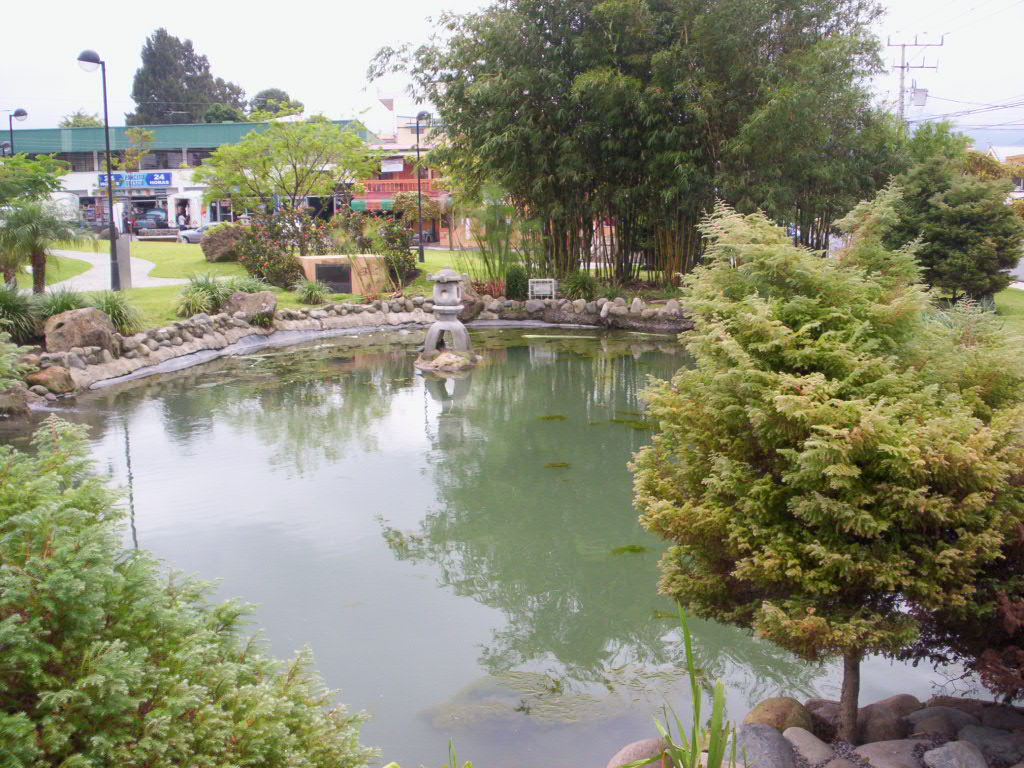
Okayama Park

=== Theaters and auditoriums ===
San José has a number of theaters, many with European-inspired architecture. These buildings serve as the city's main tourist attractions, not only because of their architecture, but because of the cultural, musical, and artistic presentations and activities, which include traditional and modern Costa Rican and San Josefinan culture.

The most well-known are:

- The National Theater of Costa Rica (Teatro Nacional de Costa Rica)
- The Melico Salazar Theater (Teatro Popular Melico Salazar)
- The National Auditorium of The Children's Museum of Costa Rica (Museo de los Niños)

The National Theater of Costa Rica (considered the finest historic building in the capital and known for its exquisite interior which includes its lavish Italian furnishings) and the Melico Salazar Theater present drama, dance performances and concerts throughout the year. Other smaller theaters can be found throughout the city and provide a wide array of entertainment.

El Teatro Variedades (1892) is San José's oldest theater.

=== Museums ===
San José is also host to various museums. These museums allow visitors to view Costa Rican history, scientific discoveries, pre-Columbian era culture and art, as well as modern Costa Rican art. The city is also host to the nation's museum of gold and museum of jade.

Some of the city's main museums are:

- The Children's Museum (Museo de los Niños)
- The National Museum of Costa Rica (Museo Nacional de Costa Rica)
- The Museum of Pre-Columbian Gold (Museo de Oro Precolombino)
- The Costa Rican Museum of Art (Museo de Arte Costarricense)
- The Museum of Contemporary Art and Design (Museo de Arte y Diseño Contemporáneo)
- The Museum of Jade (Museo del Jade Marco Fidel Tristán Castro)

=== Parks, plazas, and zoos ===
San José is home to many parks and squares (plazas in Spanish) where one can find gazebos, open green areas, recreational areas, lakes, fountains, statues and sculptures by Costa Rican artists and many different bird, tree and plant species.

==== Parks and zoos ====
The city's primary parks include:

- The National Park (Parque Nacional)
- Morazán Park (Parque Morazán) — with Neoclassical Temple of Music (Templo de la Música) pavilion
- La Sabana Metropolitan Park (Parque Metropolitano La Sabana) — largest park and "the lungs of San José," in Mata Redonda District (west city)
- Peace Park (Parque de la Paz)
- Okayama Park (Parque Okayama) — Japanese style garden and architectural elements, ornamental ponds, and garden sculptures
- Simón Bolívar Zoo — the city's only zoo, with a large variety of native Costa Rican and exotic animals and plant species

==== Plazas ====
Plazas, or town squares, are very prominent across San José's districts.

- Plaza de la Democracia
- Culture Square — La Plaza de La Cultura

== Transport ==
San José has several internal transport networks that connect the city districts and metropolitan area, as well as national networks that connect the city to other parts of Costa Rica.

San José is undergoing modernization in transport. In February 2011, the former mayor, Johnny Araya, along with then Costa Rican President, Laura Chinchilla, announced the establishment of an urban tramway system that will, in its first phase, cover the central core of the city going from west to east.

On 27 September 2012, San José disclosed plans to install its first street signs, about 22,000 signs and plaques. It is estimated that the lack of proper street names for directions causes the loss of $720 million a year by the Inter-American Development Bank in 2008, due to undelivered, returned or re-sent mail.

=== Roads ===
The following national road routes cover the city:

- National Route 1
- National Route 2
- National Route 3
- National Route 27
- National Route 39
- National Route 100
- National Route 101
- National Route 104
- National Route 108
- National Route 110
- National Route 167
- National Route 174
- National Route 175
- National Route 176
- National Route 177
- National Route 204
- National Route 207
- National Route 209
- National Route 211
- National Route 213
- National Route 214
- National Route 215
- National Route 218

=== Buses ===
Private bus companies connect different areas of the city with each other and the suburbs. Services to other parts of the country are provided by other private companies which have stations or stops spread all over the city center. There are also bus services between Juan Santamaría International Airport and downtown San José.

=== Train ===
The Instituto Costarricense de Ferrocarriles, or the state-owned railway institute, is in charge of all of Costa Rica's railways. In 2004, this institution began work on the establishment of an inter-urban railway network. This network would connect Tibás, Heredia, San Antonio de Belén, Pavas, San Pedro de Montes de Oca, Sabanilla, and Curridabat, among other locations.

There are three routes: Route A: San José - Heredia - Alajuela, which begins in Estación Atlantico and ends in Alajuela; Route B: Curridabat - Pavas - Belen, which begins in Estación Atlantico and ends in San Antonio de Belen; Route C: San José - Cartago; which begins in Estación Atlantico and ends in Cartago.

=== Taxis ===
San José public taxi services complement the urban transportation network. Taxis are characterized by their red color and belong to registered cooperatives. There are other taxi services which do not belong to the registered system, there are also taxis from the airport that are usually orange.

The ride-sharing company Uber is active in Costa Rica and, despite repeated clashes with and strikes by taxi drivers protesting unfair competition, continues to operate in the country. In September 2025, a labor court in San José ruled that Uber must treat their drivers as employees rather than independent contractors.

=== Airports ===
The city is serviced by Juan Santamaría International Airport (IATA: SJO, ICAO: MROC), located 23 km (14 mi) east of downtown in the city of Alajuela, and is one of the busiest airports in Central America. In 2011, the airport was named the 3rd Best Airport in Latin America/Caribbean from the Airport Service Quality Awards by Airports Council International. In 2023, Juan Santamaría International Airport received 5.6 million passengers, most of them from international flights.

The airport is undergoing a modernization plan, which is expected to be brief. The previous remodeling done to the airport cost around $7 million.

Another important airport in San José is Tobías Bolaños International Airport (IATA: SYQ, ICAO: MRPV). It is located 8 km (5 mi) north-west of the city proper and 11 km (7 mi) south-east of Juan Santamaría International Airport.

== Cuisine ==
Costa Rican cuisine, called comida típica ("traditional food"), is generally not spicy. Throughout San José, the most popular food is the national dish of gallo pinto ("painted chicken"), which is black beans served with white rice. Gallo pinto is usually served for breakfast with tortillas and natilla, a thin sour cream. Costa Rican restaurants serving traditional food at an affordable price are called sodas and usually offer substantial casados for lunch and dinner. A casado (meaning "married" or "married man" in Spanish) consists of rice, beans, and meat, with cabbage-and-tomato salad, fried plantains, and tortillas. San José Central Market, in downtown San José, has numerous food markets and sodas.

== Sport ==
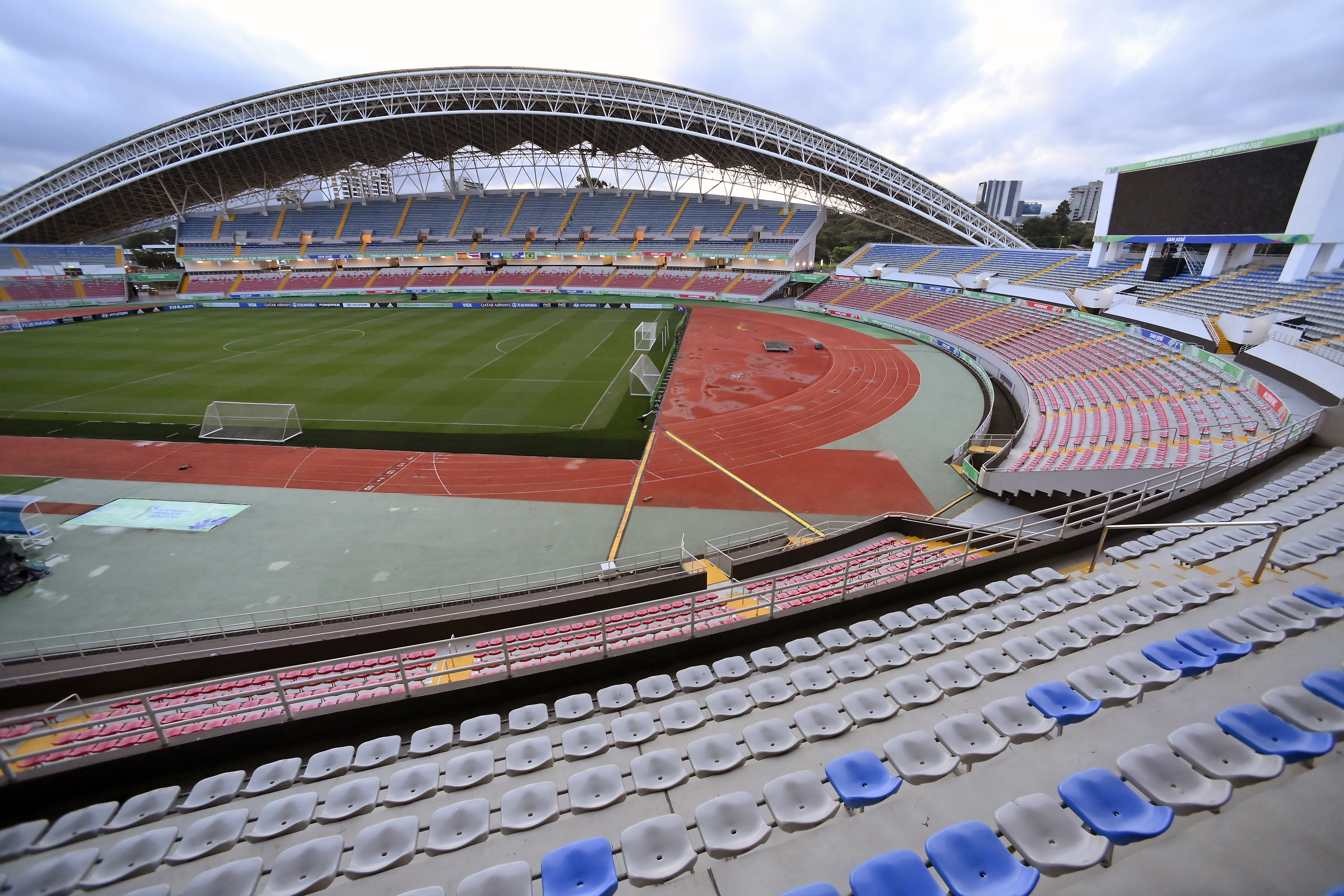
Estadio Nacional de Costa Rica

The city's major football club is Deportivo Saprissa, which has won a record 40 league titles. The team plays its home games at the Estadio Ricardo Saprissa Aymá, which is located in Tibas. Another top-level club, Universidad, plays at the Estadio Ecológico.

San José hosted the 2015 FIBA COCABA Championship at the Gimnasio Nacional, where the Costa Rica national basketball team finished 2nd.

== Twin towns – sister cities ==
San José is twinned with:

| Athens, Greece; Buenos Aires, Argentina; Caracas, Venezuela; Taipei, Taiwan; Santiago, Chile; Rio de Janeiro, Brazil; Madrid, Spain; Chimbote, Peru; Huancayo, Peru; Juliaca, Peru | (Peru) Lima, Perú; Miami-Dade County, United States; McAllen, United States; San Jose, United States; Kfar Saba, Israel; Okayama, Japan; Guadalajara, Mexico; Mexico City, Mexico; Ecatepec, Mexico; Managua, Nicaragua | Beijing, China; Ahuachapán, El Salvador; Guatemala City, Guatemala; Quetzaltenango, Guatemala; Goiânia, Brazil; Maracay, Venezuela; Montevideo, Uruguay; San Pedro Sula, Honduras; Jayapura, Indonesia; Bari, Italy |

== Notable people ==
This is an alphabetical list of notable people who were born in or have lived in San José.

- Manuel Aguilar Chacón, former head of state of Costa Rica
- Randall Arauz, environmentalist
- Alicia Avilés, community leader
- Randall Azofeifa, football player for Herediano
- Rafael Ángel Calderón Guardia, former president of Costa Rica
- Nidia Barboza, poet and feminist activist
- Daniel Cambronero, goalkeeper
- Joel Campbell, football player who used to play for Arsenal F.C.
- Franklin Chang-Díaz, former astronaut
- Laura Chinchilla, former president of Costa Rica
- Danny Formal, racing driver
- Francisco Gamboa, economist
- Manuel de la Cruz González, artist
- Mirta González Suárez, psychologist and writer
- Maribel Guardia, actress and singer
- Jens Hoffmann, writer and art curator
- Eunice Odio, writer
- Virginia Pérez-Ratton, artist
- Floria Pinto, artist
- Raquel Rodríguez, football player for Portland Thorns FC and the Costa Rica women's national football team
- Fernando Sánchez Campos, politician
- Ariel Sexton, mixed martial artist for ONE Championship
- Harry Shum Jr., dancer and actor
- Douglas Soto, politician
- Daniel Zovatto, American actor
