= Catedral (district) =

District in San José province, Costa Rica

- District
- Interactive map of Catedral
- Catedral district location in Costa Rica
- Coordinates: 9.9245673°N 84.0713422°W
- Country: Costa Rica
- Province: San José
- Canton: San José
- Creation: 7 December 1848

Area
  - Total: 2.35 km^{2} (0.91 sq mi)
- Elevation: 1,161 m (3,809 ft)

Population (2011)
  - Total: 12,936
  - Density: 5,500/km^{2} (14,300/sq mi)
- Time zone: UTC−06:00
- Postal code: 10104
- Website: MSJ.go.cr

Catedral is a district of the San José canton in the San José province of Costa Rica. It is one of the four administrative units that form San José downtown properly.

== Toponymy ==
The district receives its name because of the Cathedral and the catholic Archdiocese of San José, the only archdiocese in the country which lies between its boundaries, along with several other government buildings.

== Geography ==
Catedral has an area of 2.35 km^{2} and an elevation of 1,161 metres.

Catedral is on the center-east of the canton, and has a small portion of boundary with Montes de Oca Canton at its eastern part. The division also borders (clockwise) Zapote district to the east, San Sebastián district to the south, Hospital and Merced districts to the west, and El Carmen district to the north.

== Locations ==
This district comprises several "barrios" or neighbourhoods, like Bellavista, California (part of it), Carlos María Jiménez, Dolorosa (part of it), González Lahman, Güell, La Cruz, Lomas de Ocloro, Luján, Miflor, Naciones Unidas, Pacífico (part of it), San Cayetano (part of it), Soledad, Tabacalera, Vasconia. Some of the buildings between its limits are:

- National Theatre of Costa Rica. The country's most important theater and cultural reference.
- Caja Costarricense del Seguro Social. Government office in charge of medical and social security.
- Cathedral of San José. Main church of the city and home of the archbishop.
- Tribunals of Justice. In charge of the judiciary power on the country.

== Demographics ==
Historical population
Census	Pop.	±% p.a.
1883	2,576	—
1892	3,853	+4.58%
1927	15,001	+3.96%
1950	25,240	+2.29%
1963	31,516	+1.72%
1973	28,590	−0.97%
1984	21,574	−2.53%
2000	15,341	−2.11%
2011	12,936	−1.54%
2022	14,355	+0.95%
Source: Instituto Nacional de Estadística y Censos; Centro Centroamericano de Población

For the 2011 census, Catedral had a population of 12,936 inhabitants. The population density is the highest of the four downtown districts.

== Transportation ==
=== Road transportation ===
The district is covered by the following road routes:

- National Route 2
- National Route 175
- National Route 204
- National Route 209
- National Route 213
- National Route 215
- National Route 218

=== Rail transportation ===
The Interurbano Line operated by Incofer goes through this district.
