= Patarrá =

District in Desamparados canton, San José province, Costa Rica

- District
- Patarrá district
- Patarrá district location in Costa Rica
- Coordinates: 9.8636848°N 84.0247576°W
- Country: Costa Rica
- Province: San José
- Canton: Desamparados

Area
  - Total: 16.09 km^{2} (6.21 sq mi)
- Elevation: 1,200 m (3,900 ft)

Population (2011)
  - Total: 11,921
  - Density: 740.9/km^{2} (1,919/sq mi)
- Time zone: UTC−06:00
- Postal code: 10307

Patarrá is a district of the Desamparados canton, in the San José province of Costa Rica.

== Geography ==
Patarrá has an area of 16.09 km^{2} and an elevation of 1,200 metres.

== Demographics ==
Historical population
Census	Pop.	±% p.a.
1892	434	—
1950	1,059	+1.55%
1963	2,902	+8.06%
1973	1,971	−3.79%
1984	3,390	+5.05%
2000	28,451	+14.22%
2011	11,921	−7.60%
2022	12,756	+0.62%
Source: Instituto Nacional de Estadística y Censos; Centro Centroamericano de Población

For the 2011 census, Patarrá had a population of 11,921 inhabitants.

== Transportation ==
=== Road transportation ===
The district is covered by the following road routes:

- National Route 212
