= San Rafael Arriba =

District in Desamparados canton, San José province, Costa Rica

- District
- San Rafael Arriba district
- San Rafael Arriba district location in Costa Rica
- Coordinates: 9.8778342°N 84.0707711°W
- Country: Costa Rica
- Province: San José
- Canton: Desamparados

Area
  - Total: 3.21 km^{2} (1.24 sq mi)
- Elevation: 1,200 m (3,900 ft)

Population (2011)
  - Total: 15,262
  - Density: 4,750/km^{2} (12,300/sq mi)
- Time zone: UTC−06:00
- Postal code: 10304

San Rafael Arriba is a district of the Desamparados canton, in the San José province of Costa Rica.

== Geography ==
San Rafael Arriba has an area of 3.21 km^{2} and an elevation of 1,200 metres.

== Demographics ==
Historical population
| Census | Pop. | ±% p.a. |
|---|---|---|
| 1864 | 480 | — |
| 1883 | 780 | +2.59% |
| 1892 | 775 | −0.07% |
| 1927 | 1,072 | +0.93% |
| 1950 | 1,830 | +2.35% |
| 1963 | 4,577 | +7.31% |
| 1973 | 5,550 | +1.95% |
| 1984 | 7,550 | +2.84% |
| 2000 | 13,008 | +3.46% |
| 2011 | 15,262 | +1.46% |
| 2022 | 24,008 | +4.20% |
Source: Instituto Nacional de Estadística y Censos; Centro Centroamericano de Población

For the 2011 census, San Rafael Arriba had a population of 15,262 inhabitants.

== Transportation ==
=== Road transportation ===
The district is covered by the following road routes:

- National Route 209
- National Route 214
