= Merced (district) =

District in San José canton, San José province, Costa Rica

- District
- Interactive map of Merced
- Merced district location in Costa Rica
- Coordinates: 9.9399591°N 84.0883582°W
- Country: Costa Rica
- Province: San José
- Canton: San José

Area
  - Total: 2.17 km^{2} (0.84 sq mi)
- Elevation: 1,154 m (3,786 ft)

Population (2011)
  - Total: 12,257
  - Density: 5,650/km^{2} (14,600/sq mi)
- Time zone: UTC−06:00
- Postal code: 10102

Merced is a district of the San José canton, in the San José province of Costa Rica. It is one of the four administrative units that form San José downtown (casco central) properly. This division is merely commercial, but covers an important part of "josefino" life and activities.

== Geography ==
Merced has an area of 2.17 km^{2} and an elevation of 1154 metres.

Merced lies in the north of the canton, limiting only with Tibás Canton from San José Province to the north, and with the districts of Uruca to the north, Mata Redonda to the west, Hospital to the south, and Uruca and El Carmen districts to the east, all of them from the same canton of San José.

== Locations ==
This district comprehend several "barrios" or neighbourhoods, like Bajos de la Unión, Claret, Coca-Cola, Iglesias Flores, Mantica, Barrio México, and Paso de la Vaca y Pitahaya. In the territory there are many banks, public institutions, and popular markets. Its main landmark is the Costa Rican Center of Science and Culture, one of the main institutions of Costa Rican culture. The neighborhoods are full of history and some of them are known for received several immigrants from all over the world during different decades. By the early 1950s, many members of the Jewish and Asian communities were established around Paseo Colón near Barrio La Pitahaya and Mantica, but this changed drastically after moving San José Synagogue to the West Area of the city (Escazú). Nowadays the zone is populated by Costa Ricans, Nicaraguans, Colombians, Venezuelans, Americans, Italians, and Dominicans, making La Pitahaya one of the most diverse neighborhood in SJO. Barrio Mexico and Barrio Claret has been the first stop in San José for thousands for limonenses since the early 1960s.

== Demographics ==
Historical population
Census	Pop.	±% p.a.
1883	3,444	—
1892	5,257	+4.81%
1927	9,645	+1.75%
1950	18,920	+2.97%
1963	22,064	+1.19%
1973	19,938	−1.01%
1984	15,363	−2.34%
2000	13,565	−0.77%
2011	12,257	−0.92%
2022	15,804	+2.34%
Source: Instituto Nacional de Estadística y Censos; Centro Centroamericano de Población

For the 2011 census, Merced had a population of 12,257 inhabitants.

== Transportation ==
=== Road transportation ===
The district is covered by the following road routes:

- National Route 1
- National Route 108
