= Desamparados (canton) =

Canton in San José province, Costa Rica

- Canton
- Flag Seal
- Interactive map of Desamparados
- Desamparados canton location in San José Province Desamparados canton location in Costa Rica
- Coordinates: 9.8114083°N 84.0289552°W
- Country: Costa Rica
- Province: San José
- Creation: 4 November 1862
- City: Desamparados
- Districts: Districts: Desamparados; San Miguel; San Juan de Dios; San Rafael Arriba; San Antonio; Frailes; Patarrá; San Cristóbal; Rosario; Damas; San Rafael Abajo; Gravilias; Los Guido

Government
  - Type: Municipality
  - Body: Municipalidad de Desamparados
  - Mayor: María Antonieta Naranjo Brenes (PLN)

Area
  - Total: 118.89 km^{2} (45.90 sq mi)
- Elevation: 1,270 m (4,170 ft)

Population (2011)
  - Total: 208,411
  - Estimate (2022): 223,226
  - Density: 1,753.0/km^{2} (4,540.2/sq mi)
- Time zone: UTC−06:00
- Canton code: 103
- Website: www.desamparados.go.cr

Desamparados is the 3rd canton in the province of San José in Costa Rica. The canton covers an area of 118.89 km^{2} (45.90 sq mi), and had a population of 223,226 in 2022, making it the third most populated among the 81 cantons of Costa Rica. The canton's capital city is also called Desamparados.

The canton begins in the southern suburbs of the national capital city of San José, with the Tiribí River marking its northern boundary. It snakes its way south as a backward letter S, finally reaching its southern limit at the Tarrazú River. It contains the bigger of the last forest lungs in the Greater Metropolitan Area, the Loma Salitral, which conservation issues have generated social conflicts between community environmentalists and immobility developers, as it is seen as an identity mark of the desamparadeño people and a vital infiltration area to prevent the frequents and disastrous floods in the district of Gravilias.

Urban areas claim 80.4% of the canton's population. Those under age 10 comprise 19.8% of its inhabitants, while 5.1% are over 65.

== History ==
The canton was established by a legislative decree of November 4, 1862.

== Government ==
=== Mayor ===
According to Costa Rica's Municipal Code, mayors are elected every four years by the population of the canton. As of the latest municipal elections in 2024, the National Liberation Party candidate, María Antonieta Naranjo Brenes, was elected mayor of the canton with 26.38% of the votes, with Carlos Alberto Padilla Corella and Kenneth Alexander Cubillo Vargas as first and second vice mayors, respectively.

Mayors since the 2002 elections
Period	Name	Party
2002–2006	Carlos Alberto Padilla Corella	PLN
2006–2010	Maureen Fallas Fallas	PLN
2010–2016	Maureen Fallas Fallas	PLN
2016–2020	Gilbert Adolfo Jiménez Siles (Note: Also legally known as Gilbert Jiménez Siles)	PLN
2020–2024	Gilbert Adolfo Jiménez Siles	PLN
2024–2028	María Antonieta Naranjo Brenes	PLN

=== Municipal Council ===
Like the mayor and vice mayors, members of the Municipal Council (called regidores) are elected every four years. Desamparados' Municipal Council has 11 seats for regidores and their substitutes, who can participate in meetings but not vote unless the owning regidor (regidor propietario) is absent. The current president of the Municipal Council is the regidor for Social Christian Unity Party, María Isabel Llamas Echeverría, with the regidor for Our Town Party, Luis José Flores Jiménez, as vice president. The Municipal Council's composition for the 2024-2028 period is as follows:

Current composition of the Municipal Council of Desamparados after the 2024 municipal elections
Political parties in the Municipal Council of Desamparados
Political party	Regidores		
Political party	№	Owner	Substitute
National Liberation Party (PLN)	3	Gabriel Gustavo Picado Oviedo	Vinicio Alberto Valverde Chacón
National Liberation Party (PLN)	3	Karla Vanessa Mora Rodríguez	Zaira Elena Romero Fallas
National Liberation Party (PLN)	3	Juan Chacón Castillo	Manuel Araya Badilla
Social Christian Unity Party (PUSC)	2	Jonatan Mauricio Chavarría Sibaja	Randall Sibaja Miranda
Social Christian Unity Party (PUSC)	2	María Isabel Llamas Echeverría^{(P)}	Carmen Martínez Jackson
Social Democratic Progress Party (PSD)	1	Ricardo Antonio Arce Díaz	William Solera Alfaro
Progressive Liberal Party (PLP)	1	Luis Guillermo Gómez Godínez	Javier Umaña Valenciano
Our Town Party (PNP)	1	Luis José Flores Jiménez^{(VP)}	Adrián Eduardo Monge Monge
New Republic Party (PNR)	1	Cristian Arturo Chacón Ureña (Note: Also legally known as Kristhian Arturo Chacón Ureña)	Walter Jesús Garro Araya
Broad Front (FA)	1	Eduardo Guillén Gardela (Note: Also legally known as Eduardo Gardela Ramírez)	Mario Esteban Raitt Núñez
Costa Rican Communal Ecological Party (PAEC)	1	Jesús Rodríguez Gutiérrez	José Marcial Rodríguez Carvajal

== Districts ==
The canton of Desamparados is subdivided into 13 districts:

1. Desamparados
2. San Miguel
3. San Juan de Dios
4. San Rafael Arriba
5. San Antonio
6. Frailes
7. Patarrá
8. San Cristóbal
9. Rosario
10. Damas
11. San Rafael Abajo
12. Gravilias
13. Los Guido

== Sports ==
The football soccer club Orión F.C. plays here.

== Demographics ==
Historical population
Census	Pop.	±% p.a.
1864	7,067	—
1883	5,408	−1.40%
1892	6,471	+2.01%
1927	9,463	+1.09%
1950	15,614	+2.20%
1963	33,845	+6.13%
1973	74,272	+8.18%
1984	108,824	+3.53%
2000	193,478	+3.66%
2011	208,411	+0.68%
2022	223,226	+0.63%
Source: Instituto Nacional de Estadística y Censos; Centro Centroamericano de Población

Desamparados had a population of 223,226 in 2022, the third highest in the country and up from 208,411 in the 2011 census.

According to a publication by the United Nations Development Programme, Desamparados has a Human Development Index score of 0.743, ranking it 13th in its province.

== Transportation ==
=== Road transportation ===
The following road routes cover the canton:

- National Route 105
- National Route 175
- National Route 206
- National Route 207
- National Route 209
- National Route 210
- National Route 212
- National Route 213
- National Route 214
- National Route 217
- National Route 222
- National Route 226
- National Route 304
- National Route 406
- National Route 409

== Notable people ==
- Máximo Fernández Alvarado
- Joel Campbell
- Roy Miller
- Laura Chinchilla
- Jorge Alejandro Castro
