= Carmen (district) =

District in San José canton, San José province, Costa Rica

- District
- Interactive map of Carmen
- Carmen district location in Costa Rica
- Coordinates: 9.9362998°N 84.0699635°W
- Country: Costa Rica
- Province: San José
- Canton: San José

Area
  - Total: 1.47 km^{2} (0.57 sq mi)
- Elevation: 1,156 m (3,793 ft)

Population (2011)
  - Total: 2,702
  - Density: 1,840/km^{2} (4,760/sq mi)
- Time zone: UTC−06:00
- Postal code: 10101

Carmen is the first distrito of San José Canton in Costa Rica, and one of the four administrative units that form San José downtown (casco central). This district is not heavily populated although it is a busy downtown area in daytime.

== Geography ==
Carmen lies in the north of the San José Canton. It is surrounded by other districts (going clockwise): Goicoechea Canton (north) and Montes de Oca Canton (east) from San José Province. The District borders other districts of San José Canton, Catedral District (south) and Merced District (west).

Carmen has an area of 1.47 km^{2} and an elevation of 1156 metres.

== District information ==
This district comprises several barrios or neighbourhoods, such as Barrio Amón, Barrio Aranjuez, part of Barrio La California, El Carmen, El Empalme, Barrio Escalante and Barrio Otoya. Between its boundaries there are many important institutions and buildings, including government, health and culture.

- Asamblea Legislativa de Costa Rica – Costa Rica's Legislative Assembly building
- Hospital Calderón Guardia – One of the country's three main hospitals
- Biblioteca Nacional de Costa Rica – Costa Rica's national library
- National Insurance Institute – Government-controlled monopoly enterprise for Costa Rica's insurance business
- Atlántico railway station - Main railway station hub of the Interurbano Line train

== Demographics ==
Historical population
Census	Pop.	±% p.a.
1883	3,163	—
1892	4,184	+3.16%
1927	7,330	+1.61%
1950	8,891	+0.84%
1963	9,221	+0.28%
1973	8,442	−0.88%
1984	5,942	−3.14%
2000	3,360	−3.50%
2011	2,702	−1.96%
2022	2,759	+0.19%
Source: Instituto Nacional de Estadística y Censos; Centro Centroamericano de Población

For the 2011 census, Carmen had a population of 2702 inhabitants.

== Transportation ==
=== Road transportation ===
The district is covered by the following road routes:

- National Route 218

=== Rail transportation ===
The Interurbano Line operated by Incofer goes through this district.
