= 2002 San José, Costa Rica, mayoral election =

2002 San José mayoral election
- 1 December 2002
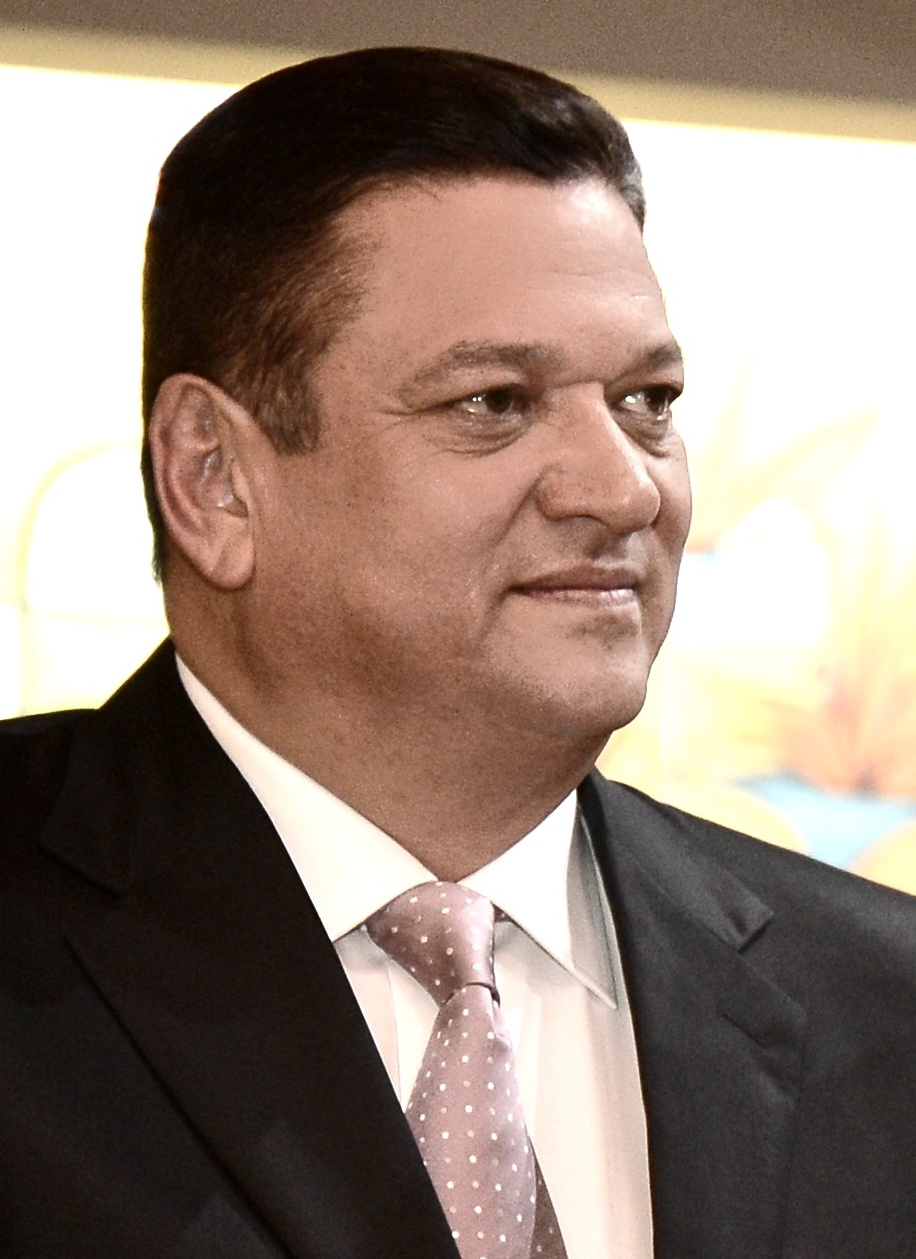

Candidate	Johnny Araya Monge	Luis Marino Castillo López
Party	PLN	PUSC
Popular vote	12 998	6134
Percentage	36%	17%
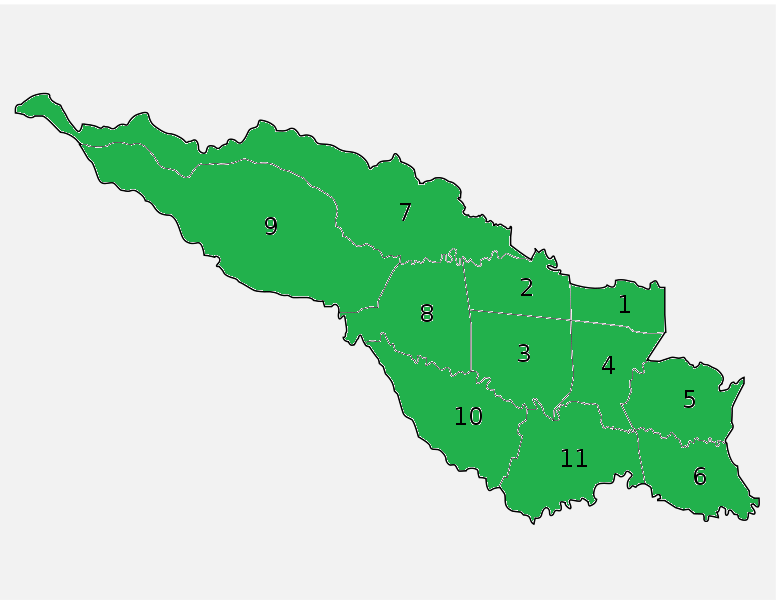
- In green districts won by Araya
Mayor before election
Johnny Araya Monge (interim)
PLN
Elected Mayor
Johnny Araya Monge
PLN

The mayoral election of San José of 2002 were the first democratic elections of the modern era to choose the newly created figure of Mayor and two deputy mayors (following the reform to the Municipal Code made in 1998), of the municipality of San José, capital of Costa Rica as with other municipalities. Syndics and District Councilmen were also elected for each of the canton's districts.

The winner was then the Municipal Executive of San José (until then appointed by the City Council of San José) Johnny Araya Monge of the National Liberation Party with 36% of the votes. Other candidates were Fernando Zumbado of San José Alliance, Luis Marino Castillo of the Social Christian Unity Party and Benjamín Odio of the Citizen Action Party.

== Results ==
San José mayoral election, 1 December 2002
Party	Candidate	Votes	%	±%
National Liberation Party	Johnny Araya Monge	12,998	36	New
Social Christian Unity Party	Luis Marino Castillo López	6,134	17	New
Alliance to Advance	Jorge Luis Vargas Espinoza	5,962	16	New
San José Alliance	Fernando Eduardo Zumbado Jiménez	4,939	13	New
Citizens' Action Party	Benjamín Odio Chan	3,534	9	New
Libertarian Movement	Douglas Altamirano Quesada	1,338	3	New
We Are All San José	Walter Sancho Gómez	981	2	New
Independent Worker's Party	Kismeth Cubero Moya	69	1	New
