= 2010 San José, Costa Rica, mayoral election =

2010 San José mayoral election
- 5 December 2010
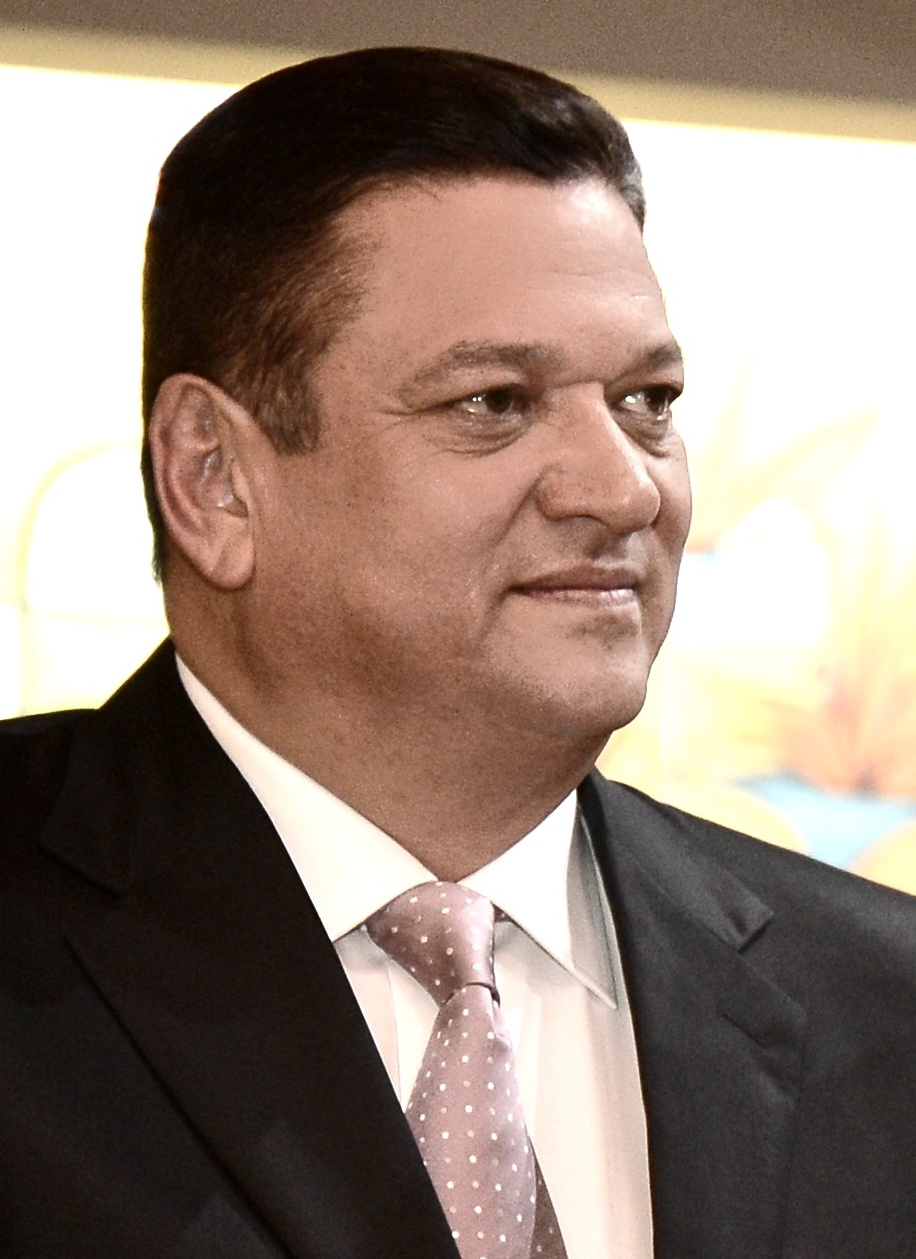

| Candidate | Johnny Araya Monge | Gloria Valerín Rodríguez |
| Party | PLN | PAC |
| Popular vote | 25,206 | 6,610 |
| Percentage | 61% | 16% |
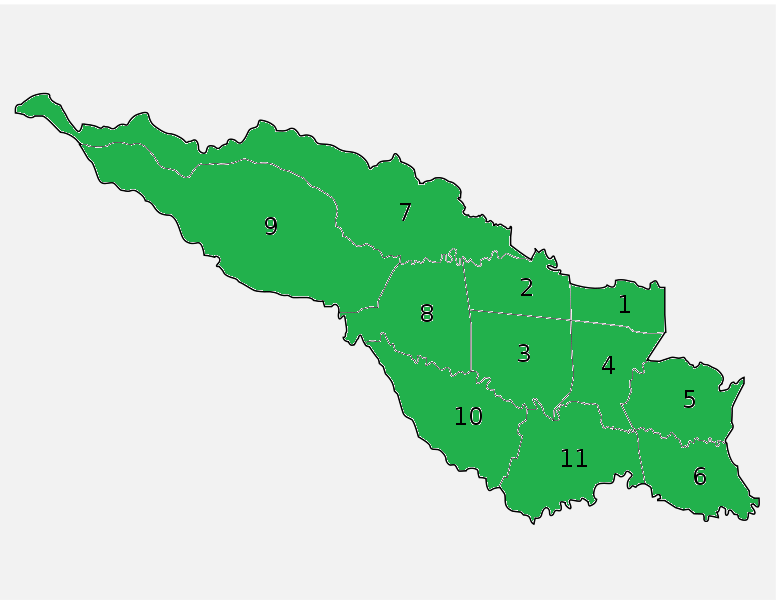
- In green districts won by Araya
Mayor before election
Johnny Araya Monge
PLN
Elected Mayor
Johnny Araya Monge
PLN

The San Jose municipal elections of 2010 were held on Sunday December 5 to elect the mayor, deputy mayors, syndics and district councilors of the central canton of San José, capital of Costa Rica. Due to legal reform unifying the municipal elections with those of aldermen, the Supreme Electoral Tribunal decreed that for a single time the authorities elected in these elections would hold office for six years, so the next elections would be in 2016.

The mayor in office Johnny Araya Monge of the National Liberation Party was the winner with more than 60% of the votes. Deputy Gloria Valerín Rodríguez, then member of the Citizens' Action Party (at the time the main opposition), was also a candidate. Deputy and former presidential candidate Óscar López Arias of the Accessibility Without Exclusion Party, as well as Mario Alfaro of the Libertarian Movement and Luis Polinaris of the National Integration Party were candidates.

== Results ==
San José mayoral election, 5 December 2010.
| Party | Candidate | Votes | % | ±% |
|---|---|---|---|---|
| National Liberation Party | Johnny Araya Monge | 25,206 | 61 | ▼2 |
| Citizens' Action Party | Gloria Valerín Rodríguez | 6,610 | 16 | ▼1 |
| Accessibility without Exclusion | Óscar Andrés López Arias | 6,277 | 15 | New |
| National Integration Party | Luis Polinaris | 1626 | 3 | ▲2 |
| Libertarian Movement | Mario Alfaro García | 1154 | 2 | ▼1 |
