= Presidency of the United Cities and Local Governments =

Presidency of the United Cities and Local Governments is a UCLG political organ, responsible for day-to-day representative function.

It consists of a President, six Co-Presidents, Treasurer and Deputy-Treasurer, as well as Special Envoys, elected at UCLG World Summit by UCLG World Council for the period of three years, reporting to semi-annual Executive Bureau and annual World Council meetings.

It is complemented by Vice-Presidency, elected by UCLG Sections.

== 2021–2024 Presidency ==
The presidency for the 2021–2024 period is:

President: Ilsur Metshin, Mayor of Kazan, Chairman of UNACLA.

Co-Presidents:

- Uğur İbrahim Altay, Mayor of the Metropolitan Municipality of Konya (Turkey)
- Johnny Araya Monge, Mayor of San José (Costa Rica)
- Anne Hidalgo, Mayor of Paris (France)
- Li Mingyuan, Mayor of Xi'an (China)
- Jan van Zanen, Mayor of The Hague (Netherlands)

Treasurers:

- Berry Vrbanovic, Mayor of Kitchener (Canada) and
- Madelaine Y. Alfelor-Gazman, Mayor of Iriga (Philippines)

Special Envoy to the United Nations: Ada Colau, Mayor of Barcelona (Spain)

Special Envoy of the Presidency to the New Urban Agenda: Carlos Martínez Mínguez, Mayor of Soria (Spain)

== 2019–2022 Presidency ==
The presidency for the 2019–2022 period is:

President: Mohamed Boudra, Mayor of Al Hoceima, President of the Moroccan Association of mayors.

Co-Presidents:

- Uğur İbrahim Altay, Mayor of the Metropolitan Municipality of Konya (Turkey)
- Li Mingyuan, Mayor of Xi'an (China)
- Johnny Araya Monge, Mayor of San José (Costa Rica)
- Thembi Nkadimeng, Mayor of Polokwane Local Municipality (South Africa)
- Berry Vrbanovic, Mayor of Kitchener (Canada) and
- Jan van Zanen, Mayor of Utrecht (Netherlands)

Treasurer: Madelaine Y. Alfelor-Gazman, Mayor of Iriga (Philippines)

Special Envoy: Ada Colau, Mayor of Barcelona (Spain) & Fernando Medina, Mayor of Lisbon (Portugal)

== 2016–2019 Presidency ==
The presidency for the 2016–2019 period is:

President: Parks Tau, President of the South African Local Government Association (SALGA).

Co-Presidents:

- Uğur İbrahim Altay, Mayor of the Metropolitan Municipality of Konya (Turkey)
- Ada Colau, Mayor of Barcelona (Spain)
- Wen Guohui, Mayor of Guangzhou (China)
- Anne Hidalgo, Mayor of Paris (France)
- Roland Ries, Mayor of Strasbourg (France)
- Mauricio Rodas Espinel, Mayor of Quito (Ecuador)

Treasurer: Berry Vrbanovic, Mayor of Kitchener (Canada)

Deputy Treasurer: Mohamed Sadiki, Mayor of Rabat (Morocco)

Vice-Presidents:

- Iván Arciénega, Mayor of Sucre (Bolivia)
- Mónica Fein, Mayor of Rosario (Argentina)
- Miguel Lifschitz, Governor of Santa Fe Province (Argentina)
- Carlos Martínez Mínguez, Mayor of Soria (Spain)
- Michael Müller, Mayor of Berlin (Germany)
- Aysen Nikolayev, ex-Mayor of Yakutsk, Head of the Sakha Republic (Russian Federation)
- Rose Christiane Raponda, Mayor of Libreville (Gabon)
- Tri Rismaharini, Mayor of Surabaya (Indonesia)
- Clark Somerville, Regional Councillor of Halton Hills (Canada)
- Fatma Şahin, Mayor of Gaziantep (Turkey)
