= 2020 San José mayoral election =

← 2016	2 February 2020	2024 →
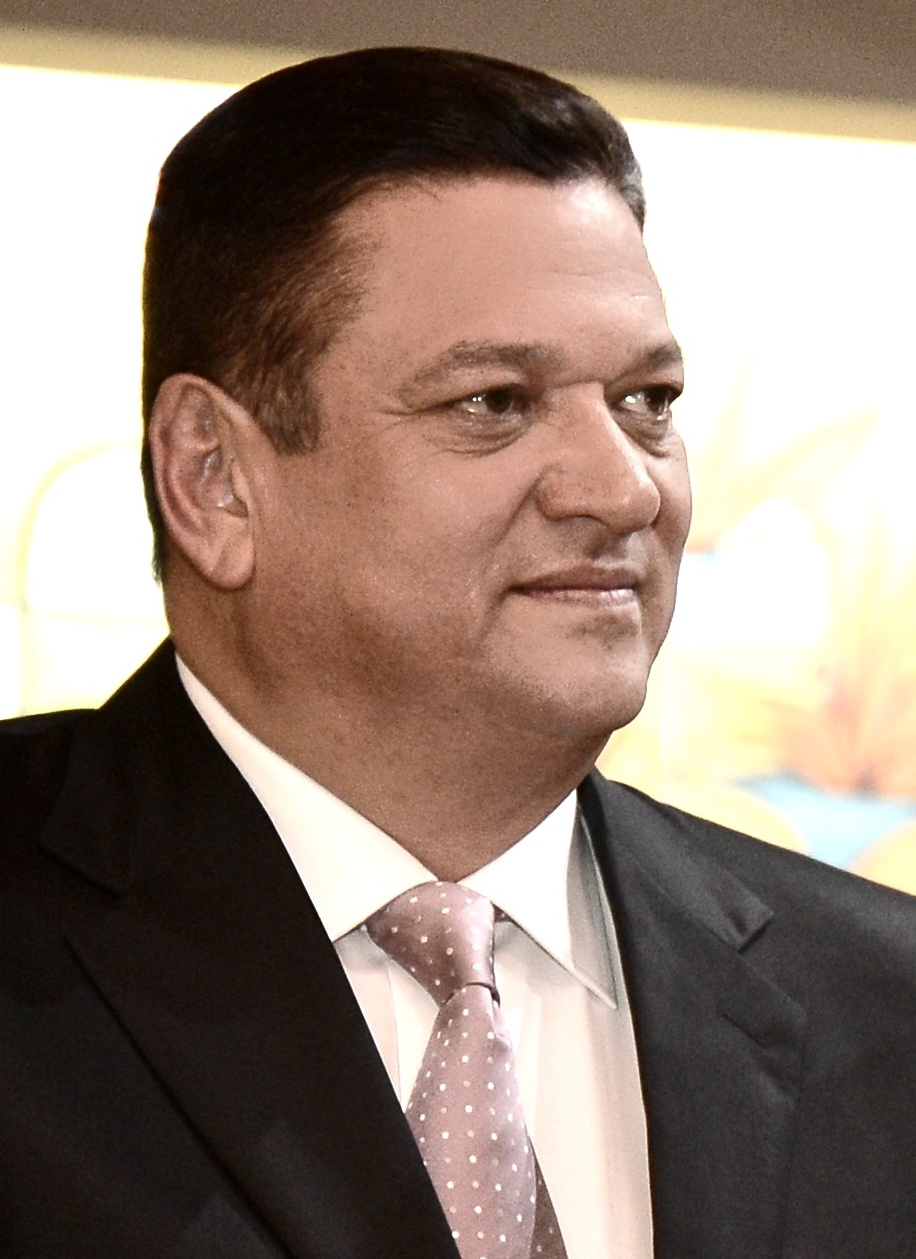

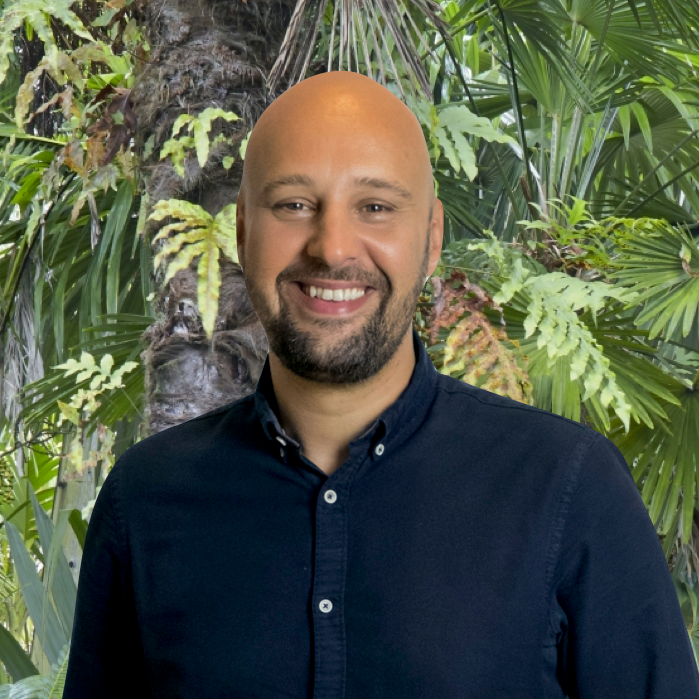
Candidate	Johnny Araya Monge	Federico Cartín Arteaga
Party	PLN	PAC
Popular vote	20,843	8,235
Percentage	37.24%	14.71%
Mayor before election
Johnny Araya Monge
PLN
Elected Mayor
Johnny Araya Monge
PLN

Mayoral and municipal elections were held in San Jose, Costa Rica, on 2 February 2020 and were the method by which the citizens of the canton of San José elected the mayor, deputy mayors, syndics, aldermen and district councilors of the capital municipality.

Incumbent Johnny Araya returns to his original party, National Liberation Party, after a two-year suspension from the Ethics' Tribunal due to his resignation as presindential nominee in the 2014 Costa Rican general election, reason for which Araya was candidate from the local San José Alliance party winning previous 2016 San José mayoral election, but returning to PLN soon after. Other important candidates were PAC's nominee, economist and urban planner and founder of Rutas Naturbanas, Federico Cartín Arteaga and San José Alliance nominee Denise Echeverría Robert. Cartín was originally part of a coalition named Chepe which was integrated by PAC and the provincial party VAMOS, however the Electoral Court disbanded the coalition as VAMOS failed to nominate any of its members, a requirement to be a coalition, but VAMOS kept its support of the candidacy. Cartín managed to return PAC as the second most voted party in San José.

== Results ==
Candidate	Party	Votes	%
Johnny Araya Monge	National Liberation Party	20,843	37.24
Federico Cartín Arteaga	Citizens' Action Party	8,235	14.71
Denise Echeverría Robert	San José Alliance	4,537	8.11
Donald Alberto Leiva Hernández	Social Christian Unity Party	4,320	7,72
Diego Miranda Méndez	Together Coalition	3,915	6.99
Tatiana Bonilla Cortés	New Republic Party	3,280	5.86
José Antonio Gutiérrez Leiva	Social Christian Republican Party	2,393	4.28
Douglas Quesada Altamirano	National Restoration Party	2,346	4.19
Fuk Choi Yan Lee	National Integration Party	1,471	2.63
Manuel Aquiles Garro Chacon	Owr Town Party	1,159	2.07
Dewin Brenes Fernández	Christian Democratic Alliance	970	1.73
Guillermo Ramírez Garay	United We Can	766	1.37
Edgar Rodríguez Ramirez	United Communal	742	1.33
Roberto Rafael Mesen Vega	Anti-Corruption Party	535	0.96
Alberto Courrau Quesada	Cantonal Innovation	461	0.82
Source: TSE
