= 2006 San José, Costa Rica, mayoral election =

2006 San José mayoral election
- 3 December 2006
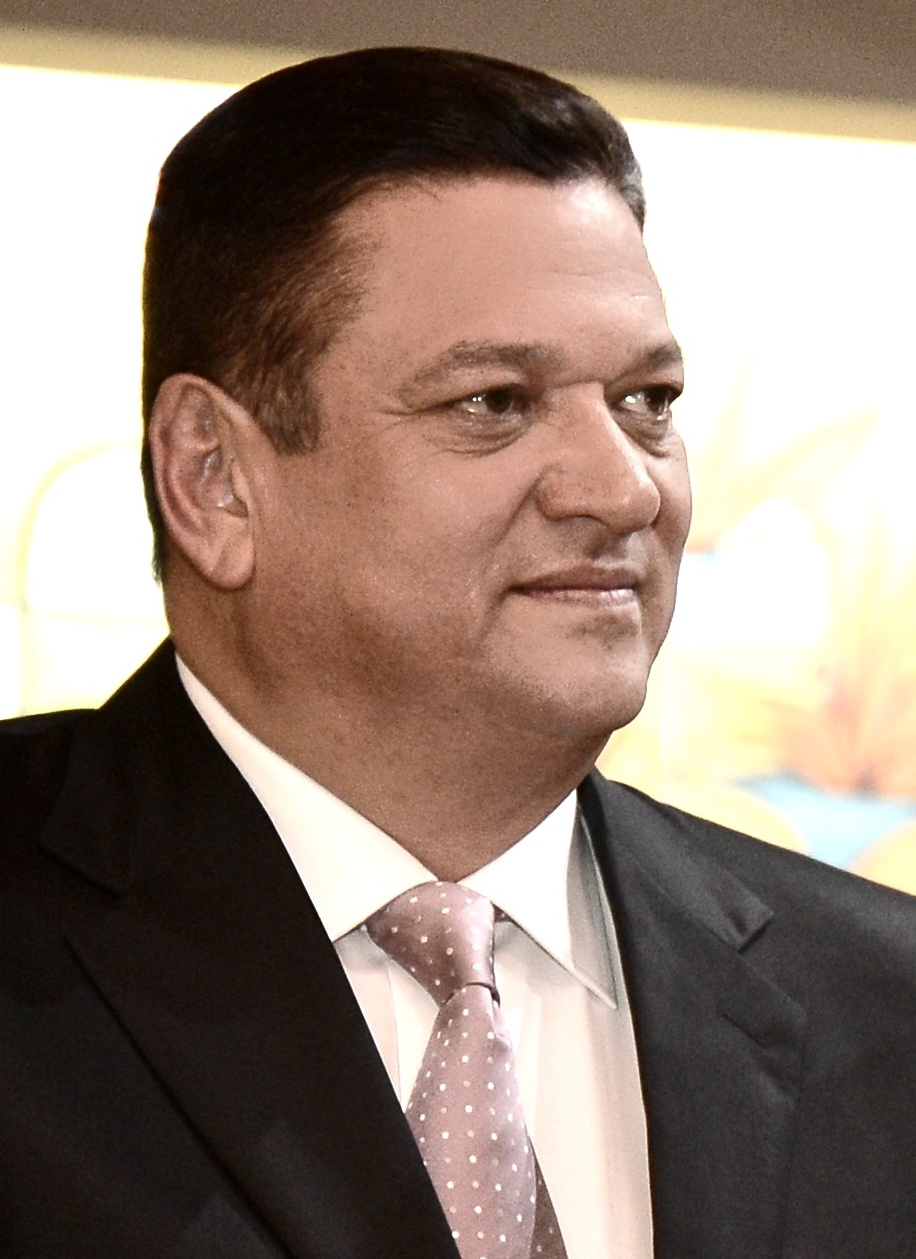

Candidate	Johnny Araya Monge	Arturo Robles Arias
Party	PLN	PAC
Popular vote	18061	5013
Percentage	68%	14%
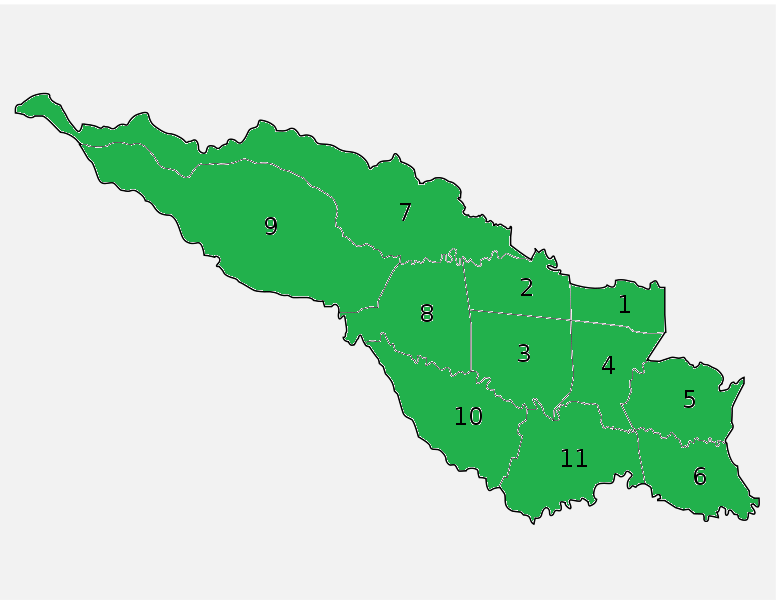
- In green districts won by Araya
Mayor before election
Johnny Araya Monge
PLN
Elected Mayor
Johnny Araya Monge
PLN

The municipal elections of the canton of San José, capital of Costa Rica, of 2006 were held on December 3 of that year. This process was the second occasion in the modern history of the country where elections were held for the election of the capital's mayor. San José, besides being the capital of the country, is the most populated canton.

The incumbent Mayor Johnny Araya Monge of the National Liberation Party (PLN) opted for reelection. His main rival was doctor Arturo Robles Arias of the Citizen Action Party (PAC), a political group that in the canton had obtained the majority of votes for his presidential ballot in the previous presidential elections held in February 2006, which were very polarized among the PLN and PAC candidates. Araya won with 68% of the votes.

The PLN also obtained all the disputed syndics of the districts of San Jose and the majority of councilors in the District Councils, even though the PAC obtained representation of councilors in all the districts.

== Results ==
San José mayoral election, 3 December 2006
Party	Candidate	Votes	%	±%
National Liberation Party	Johnny Araya Monge	18061	68	▲32
Citizens' Action Party	Arturo Robles Arias	6,134	17	▲9
San José Alliance	Luis Marino Castillo López	1,309	5	▼5
Libertarian Movement	Antonio Alexandre García	894	3	−
Costa Rican Renewal Party	Ligia Paniagua Obando	384	1	New
Of the People and For the People Party	José Francisco Herrera Umaña	378	1	New
National Integration Party	José Francisco Herrera Umaña	145	0.1	New
