= Cultural governance =

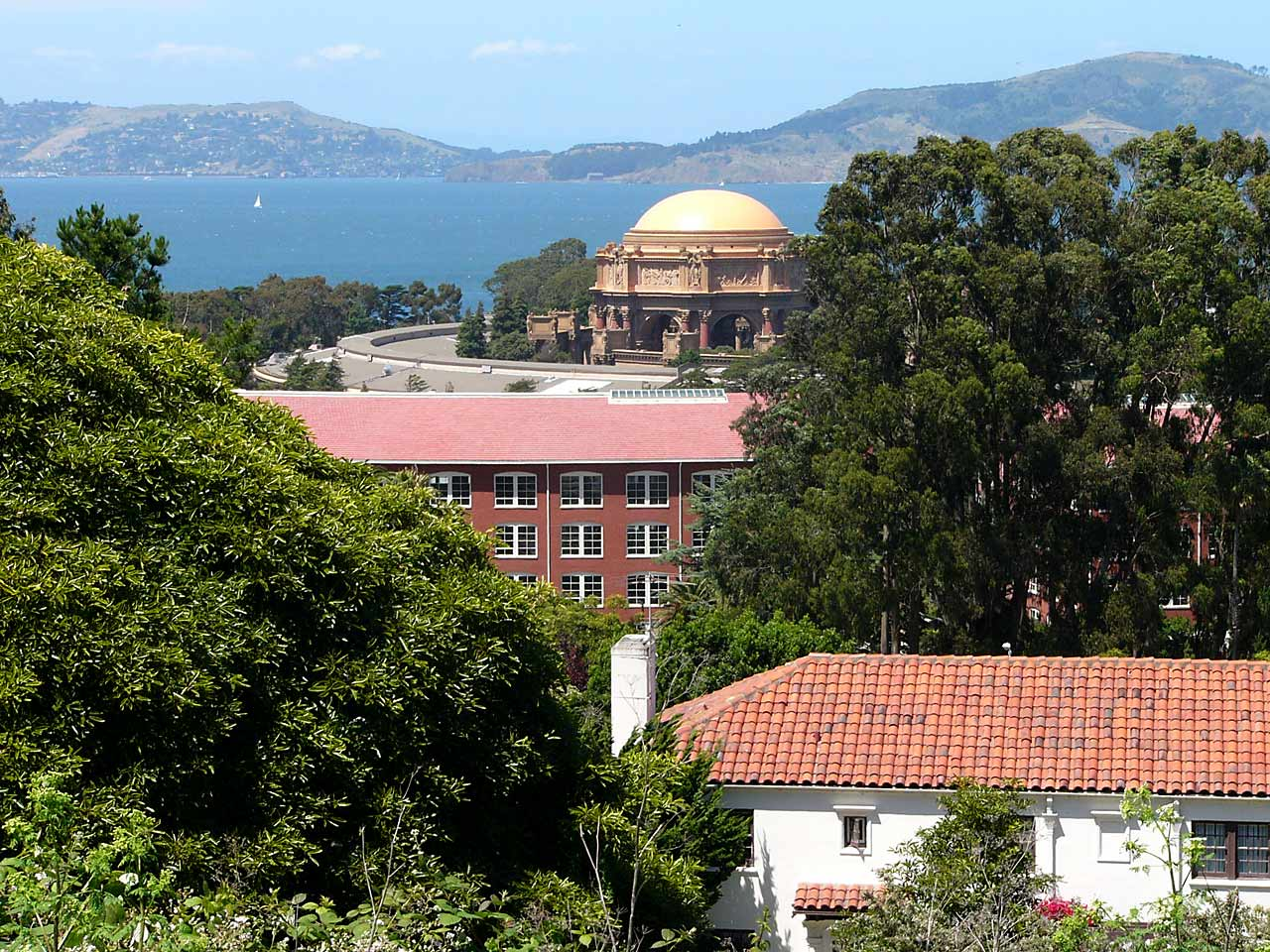
The Presidio of San Francisco in 1996 fell under the governance of The Presidio Trust, which forms partnerships with companies including Lucasfilm and Disney to develop and occupy properties.

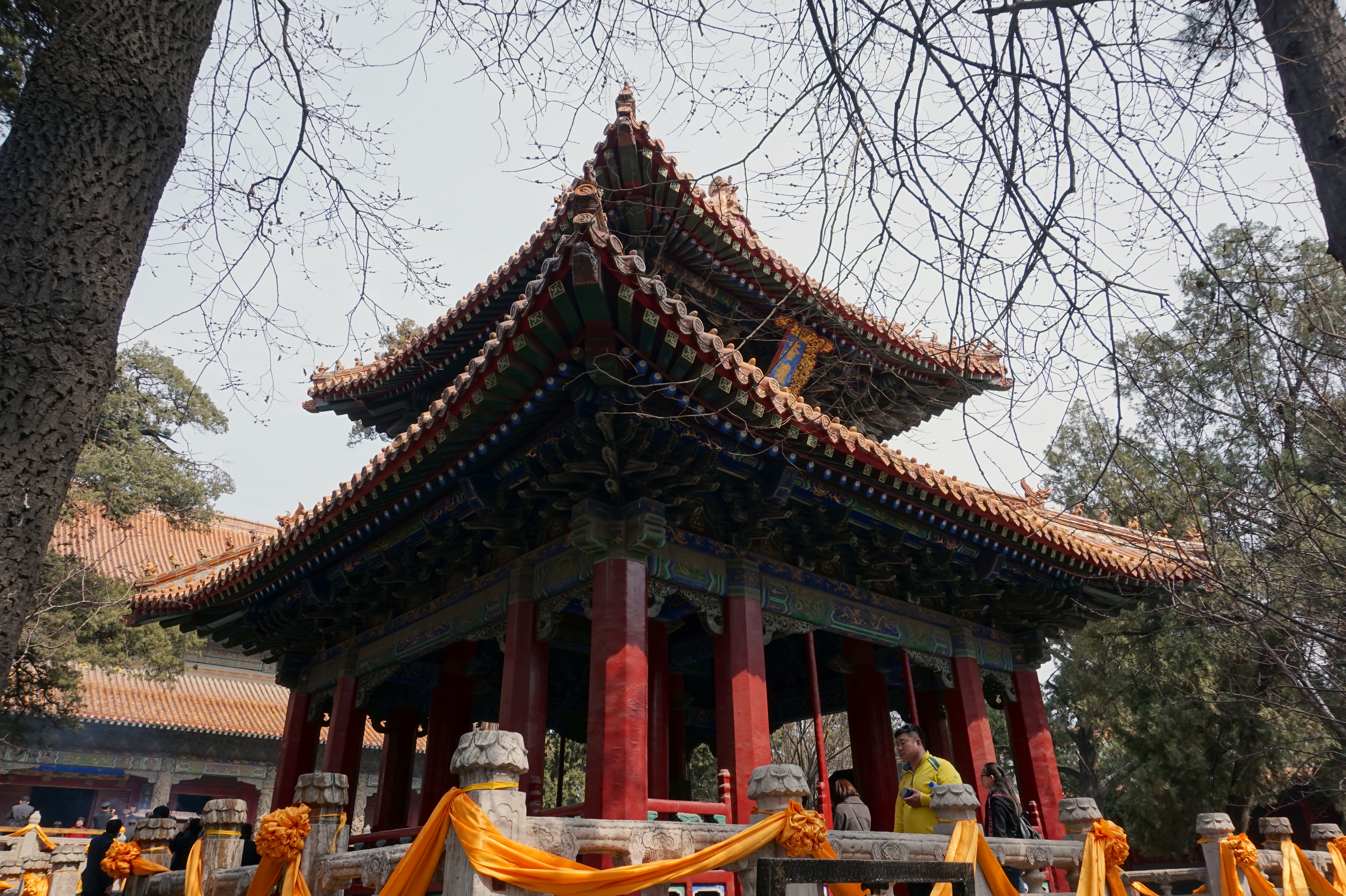
Tourist business for Temple of Confucius (a World Heritage Site) in Qufu, Shandong since 2000 has been controlled by the Shandong Confucius International Tourism Co. Ltd., 50% owned by Overseas Chinese Town Limited.

Cultural governance is governance of culture. It includes cultural policy made by governments but extends also to cultural influence exerted by non-state actors and to policies which influence culture indirectly.

== Meaning ==
The tendency to discuss cultural governance rather than policy corresponds to the broader shift from government to governance, with the emphasis shifting from state policymakers to include the influence of civil society organizations and the private sector. A broad interpretation of "governance" could also include government policies outside the scope of cultural policy which nevertheless impact culture. Cultural diversity is a very broad term and encompasses many different aspects from the visible to the invisible aspects.

The precise meaning of "cultural governance" also depends heavily on the definition of culture, which can range from narrow reference to institutions like museums and concert halls connected with the arts to broad meanings such as a society's way of life or its systems of knowledge and symbols. In the broader view, cultural governance deals holistically with the production of meaning in a society, through aspects including the culture industry, the formation of taste, and the use of language.

== Global ==
The dominant actor in global cultural governance is UNESCO, a United Nations specialized agency created in 1946 and headquartered in Paris, France. UNESCO produces documents which local governments frequently use as guidelines and may incorporate into law. It has also promoted the development of networks such as the Global Alliance for Cultural Diversity to promote public/social/private partnership in the cultural area. In recent years the organization has emphasized the importance of cities (with non-profit organizations participating in local governance) as cultural actors with networks such as the International Coalition of Cities Against Racism and the Creative Cities Network.

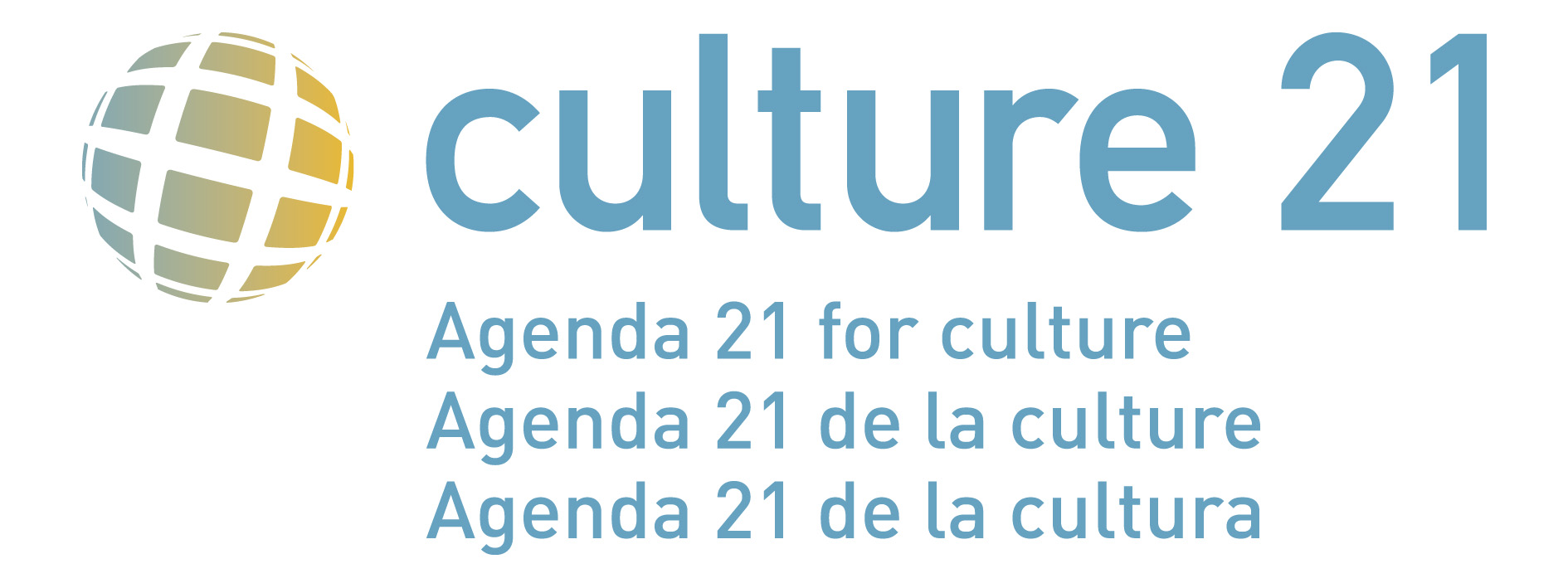
Logo of Agenda 21 for culture

UNESCO itself relies upon partnerships with the private sector in selecting, developing, and promoting World Heritage Sites. Meetings for the selection of these sites attract several hundred attendees, including representatives of interested groups. "World heritage" issues gain prominence through promotion in the mass media with publications such as National Geographic and many others. All steps of the process promote the development of a metaculture capable of adjudicating global cultural issues and producing a global literary canon from a vantage point of universality.

Agenda 21 for culture, administered by an international organization called United Cities and Local Governments, represents a vector for global governance conducted by its members at a local level. This concept endorses "culture as a fourth pillar of sustainable development", adding to the three pillars of sustainable development identified in Agenda 21: economy, society, and environment.

== Regional and local ==
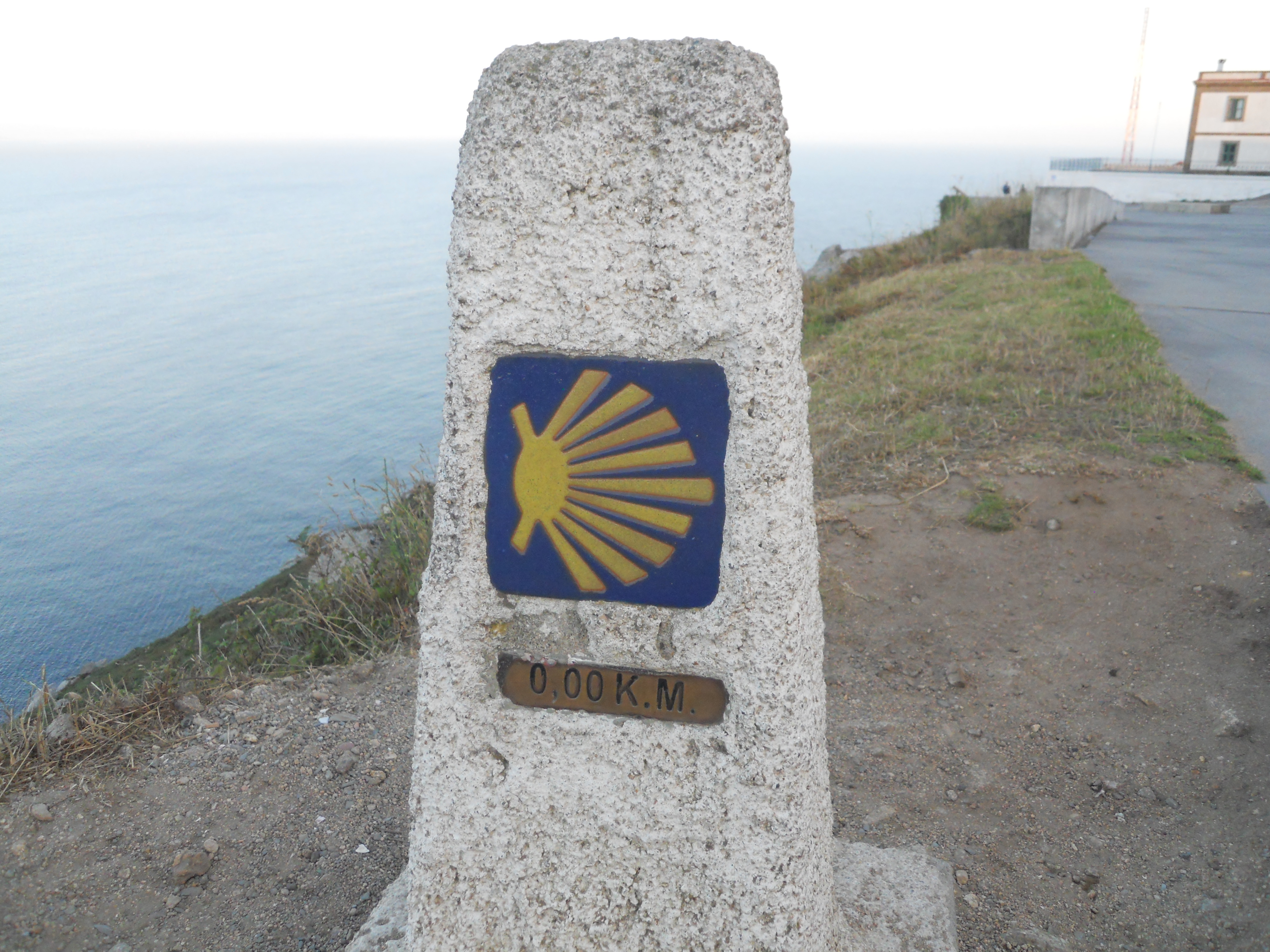
The Camino de Santiago, a medieval Christian pilgrimage route, was declared the first European Cultural Route by the Council of Europe and inscribed as a UNESCO World Heritage Site, spurring the development of local tourism and the creation of this seashell logo.

=== European Union ===
Cultural governance in the European Union includes a range of cultural policies geared toward promoting European culture.

The European Commission's 2007 communication "on a European agenda for culture in a globalizing world" describes interaction with culture through a various channels, including support for and consultation with cultural organizations, encouragement of artist mobility and intercultural communication, use of European culture in international relations, maintenance of EU copyright law, and promotion of European cultural goods and services. The European governments consider it necessary to promote and guide cultural development actively because of deficiencies in cultural outcomes of the free market. Further, intercultural communication and integration are considered intertwined with economic integration.

=== China ===
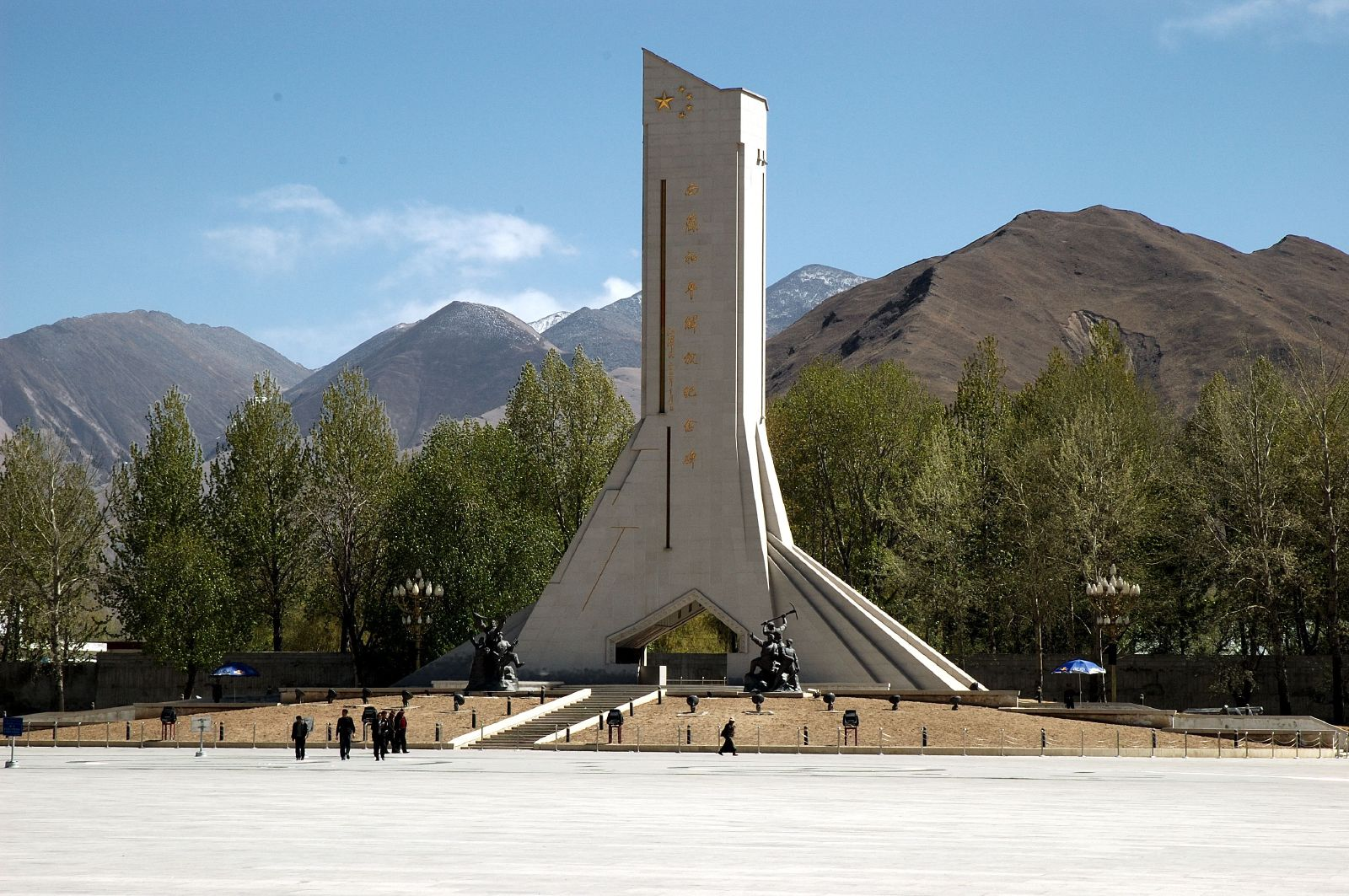
The Monument to the Peaceful Liberation of Tibet in Lhasa, Tibet, exemplifies public art with a political objective.

In the People's Republic of China a major goal of cultural governance is to reinforce the legitimacy of the state. Culture has long played a role in the governance of China, from the harmonious society promoted by Confucianism to the Cultural Revolution and other Chinese Communist Party (CCP) strategies for transforming traditional society into industrialized communism. Present-day Chinese leaders have made significant references in speeches to a continual tradition of Chinese culture and its importance for nationalist and geopolitical purposes. Cultural governance is integrated with propaganda, censorship, music, and education.

In the 1990s, the idea of "cultural sovereignty" developed in China. In this concept, culture is viewed as a demonstrating national strength.

Within China's Ministry of Culture, the State Administration of Cultural Heritage has stated that China's cultural heritage should be used to "strengthen national unity and promote sustainable development of the natural culture".

China's 2015 National Security Law addresses cultural security in Article 23. It states the state shall develop advanced socialist culture, practice Core Socialist Values, resist harmful culture, maintain its ideological dominance, and increase its cultural competitiveness.

Localities in China have assumed much of the responsibility for identifying heritage sites, with the result that 300,000 such sites have been declared, many without state protection and support. Local governments have frequently turned to private companies to manage these sites and operate tourism businesses. Sites may also come under many overlapping authorities, as in the case of Mount Wutai, a national park and World Heritage Site, which is managed by eight government agencies and governed by 29 international, national, and local laws.

Publishing in 2024, academic Sun Yi states that China has "played an increasingly dynamic role in energizing" the UN's Intangible Cultural Heritage Cooperation program.
