= Gloria Valerín Rodríguez =

Costa Rican lawyer and deputy

Deputy Legislative Assembly of Costa Rica
- In office 2002–2006
- Constituency: San José

Minister of Women's Affairs
- In office 1999–2002
- President: Miguel Ángel Rodríguez, (1998-2002)

Personal details
- Born: Sardinal, Costa Rica
- Party: Citizens' Action Party
- Profession: Lawyer and Public Servant

Gloria Valerín Rodríguez is a Costa Rican lawyer, former deputy, vice-presidential candidate, and director of technical services for the Legislative Assembly of Costa Rica. Valerín is a feminist and human rights campaigner.

== Early life ==
Valerín was born on 9 April 1955 in Sardinal de Carrillo. In 1957, her family moved to the Hatillo District of San José. She claims that being born to a family with four brothers produced her feminist beliefs. Valerín became an atheist when she was twelve years old. As a young woman, she followed her grandfather Luis Valerín by joining the Popular Vanguard Party, Costa Rica's main communist party. As a member, she was arrested several times and spent several nights in jail. She graduated from Liceo de San José (San José High School) and the University of Costa Rica.

== Political career ==
Despite being an atheist, she was a member of the Social Christian Unity Party (Partido de unidad socialcristiana, PUSC), one of the two dominant political parties of Costa Rica. From 1998 to 2001, Valerín was Minister of Women's Affairs. She was a deputy for the party between 2000 and 2004. She says that her best piece of legislation was the Paternal Law Act, which established the requirements under which people suspected of being parents could be genetically tested. Upon leaving her post as deputy, Valerín earned a bureaucratic position within the Legislative Assembly. In 2007, Valerín distanced herself from PUSC because of her opposition to the Central American Free Trade Agreement. She joined the exodus of former PUSC member and left the party. In 2006, joined the Unión Patriótica (Patriotic Union), an offshoot of the Citizens' Action Party (Partido acción ciudadana, PAC), formed by Humberto Arce. She was one of Arce's vice-presidential candidates when he ran for president in 2006. In 2008, Valerín joined PAC, supporting Ottón Solís for president.

Valerín unsuccessfully ran for mayor of San José, losing to Johnny Araya Monge in 2010.

== Personal life ==
Valerín is married to Óscar Madrigal Jiménez. She has four children and lives in the Hatillo District.
