= Culture 21 =

UCLG cultural governance program (2002-)

Culture 21, also known as Agenda 21 for culture, is a program for cultural governance developed in 2002–2004 and organized by United Cities and Local Governments.

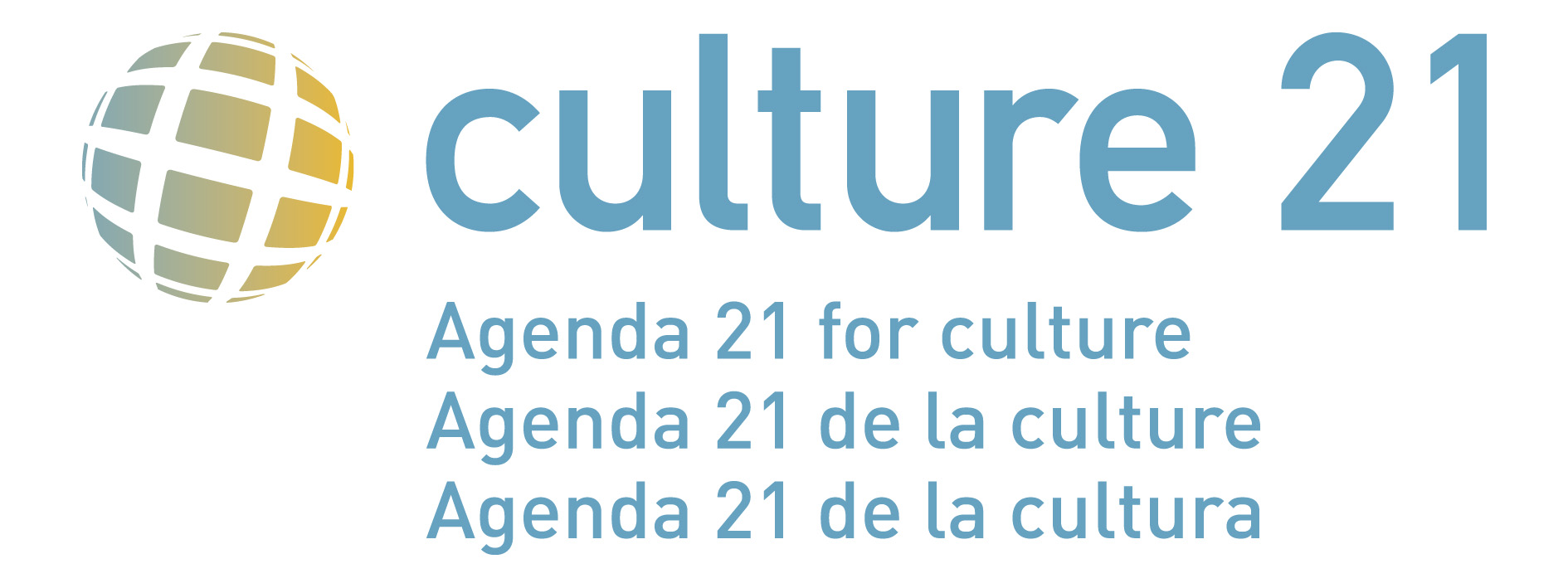

Part of the program's premise is to add culture as a fourth conceptual pillar of sustainable development in governance, the historical three pillars of which are the environment, social inclusion, and economics.

== History ==
Agenda 21 is an agenda for sustainable development in the 21st century, approved by United Nations members at the Rio de Janeiro Earth Summit in 1992. The original Agenda 21 did not discuss culture in great depth. It did include a section (Chapter 28) known as "Local Agenda 21" which called for local governments to adopt action plans and to collaborate with international organizations; a deliberative process which itself would "increase household awareness of sustainable development issues". While the ecological dimension of Local Agenda 21 was paramount at first, cities in the following years have incorporated cultural development into their outlook on sustainable development. In 1998, the World Bank and UNESCO jointly endorsed the inclusion of culture in the sustainable development strategy.

In September 2002, the first World Public Meeting on Culture, held in Porto Alegre, resolved to create guidelines for local cultural policies. A final document was approved on 8 May 2004 in Barcelona, and on 15 September it was submitted to UN-HABITAT and UNESCO. In October 2004 the United Cities and Local Governments World Council met in São Paulo, and officially adopted the Culture 21 as a reference document, to be managed and coordinated by the UCLG.

By 2010, over 400 governments and organizations had joined Culture 21 in some way. By 2015 membership exceeded 500.

== Contents ==
The Culture 21 has 67 articles, divided into three sections: principles, undertakings, and recommendations. The "Principles" include core values such as cultural diversity and human rights, as well as perspectives on which actors will implement the agenda. Cities are envisioned as primary sites for cultural production and governance, as well as places where cultural policy is necessary for harmonious coexistence. Culture itself is described as an essential part of constructing citizenship for people of all ages. Participation in culture takes place through channels including internet, public spaces, and work.

The "Undertakings" section encourages policies which support cultural development and expand access to culture without prejudice. It specifically mentions books, internet, museums, and tourism as vectors for culture. It calls for decentralized but funded cultural policies; multilateral cooperation between cultural institutions, NGOs, and governments; and popularization of scientific technical culture. It advocates the right of freedom of speech, the moral rights of authors and artists, and the development of legal systems for historic preservation. The recommendations section addresses local and national governments, regional blocs, and international organizations, offering advice for how each of them can implement this agenda.

== Organization and initiatives ==
In the UCLG, the Culture 21 is managed by the Committee on culture of the world organization United Cities and Local Governments (UCLG). The Committee on culture is co-chaired by Buenos Aires and the City of Mexico and vice-chaired by Angers, Barcelona, Belo Horizonte, Bilbao, Bogotá, Jeju, Paris and Porto Alegre since 2016. Between 2012 and 2015, the UCLG Committee on Culture was chaired by the Lille-Métropole and co-chaired by Buenos Aires, México DF and Montreal, and the cities of Angers, Barcelona and Milan were Vice-Presidents and three other cities (one from Africa, one from Middle East/Asia and one from Asia/Pacific) to join the Board as Vice-Presidents. Before 2012, the Committee on culture was chaired by Barcelona city council, and Stockholm, Lille, Buenos Aires and Montreal councils are its vice presidents.

Other organizations promoting Culture 21 include UNESCO and the Spanish Agency for International Development Cooperation (AECID).

In 2009–2010, UCLG, with AECID and the Barcelona City Council, created the Fund for Local Cultural Governance, to advance the implementation of the Culture 21 in African, Mediterranean and Latin American cities.

In 2009–2013 UNESCO and the AECID developed "Culture for Development Indicators" (CDIS), an "advocacy and policy" toll for assessing cultural development in 22 areas within 7 categories.

Moreover, the UCLG Committee on Culture has worked to ensure that culture is explicitly integrated into the development programmes of the United Nations which aim to achieve the Millennium Development Goals. After some awareness-raising actions during the Millennium Development Goals Summit, the UN General Assembly approved the final document of the Summit that mentions culture as an important dimension of development.

=== Campaign for the Sustainable Development Goals ===
UNESCO and UCLG have advocated for inclusion of culture in the 2015 Sustainable Development Goals (SDGs) and have continued to promote this outlook.

Concretely, in the years before the adoption of the SDGs several global networks campaigned for the inclusion of one specific goal devoted to culture, or for the integration of cultural aspects across the SDGs. IFACCA, IFCCD, Culture 21 (UCLG), Culture Action Europe, Arterial Network, IMC - International Music Council, ICOMOS, IFLA and the Latin American Network of Arts for Social Transformation lead this campaign, which used the banner 'The Future We Want Includes Culture' and was also known as the #culture2015goal campaign.

Between 2013 and 2015, when the SDGs were adopted, a manifesto, a declaration on the inclusion of culture in the 2030 Agenda, a proposal of possible indicators for measuring the cultural aspects of the SDGs, and an assessment of the final 2030 Agenda, were produced.

=== Contribution to the New Urban Agenda ===
The Committee on culture of UCLG participated in Habitat III, the United Nations Conference on Housing and Sustainable Urban Development, whose primary goal and outcome was the adoption of the New Urban Agenda (NUA). The conference took place in Quito, Ecuador, from 17 – 20 October 2016, and the New Urban Agenda was endorsed by the United Nations General Assembly on 23 December 2016

Before the conference, the Committee has formulated a set of comments to the issue paper on "Urban Culture and Heritage", which was one of the 22 issue papers published by the UN Task Force in preparation for the conference. The Committee welcomed the publication of this paper and believes that the New Urban Agenda should provide details of a culture-based approach to local sustainable development.

== Publications ==
Since 2006, in the framework of its research tasks, the Committee on culture of UCLG (Culture 21) has published the following reports:

- Local policies for cultural diversity
- Culture, local governments and Millennium Development Goals
- Agenda 21 for culture in France. State of affairs and outlook
- Culture and sustainable development: examples of institutional innovation and proposal of a new cultural policy profile
- Cities, cultures and developments. A report that marks the fifth anniversary of Agenda 21 for culture
- Rio+20 and culture. Advocating for Culture as a Pillar of Sustainability
- Cultural Heritage and Sustainable Development
- Operationalising culture in the sustainable development of cities
- Why must culture be at the heart of sustainable urban development?

Two briefings providing information and facilitating discussion on relevant issues regarding culture (Cities, Refugees and Culture: Briefing and Culture, Climate Change and Sustainable Development: Briefing) and the study Culture, Cities and Identity in Europe, jointly with Culture Action Europe, have been prepared.

== Culture and development ==
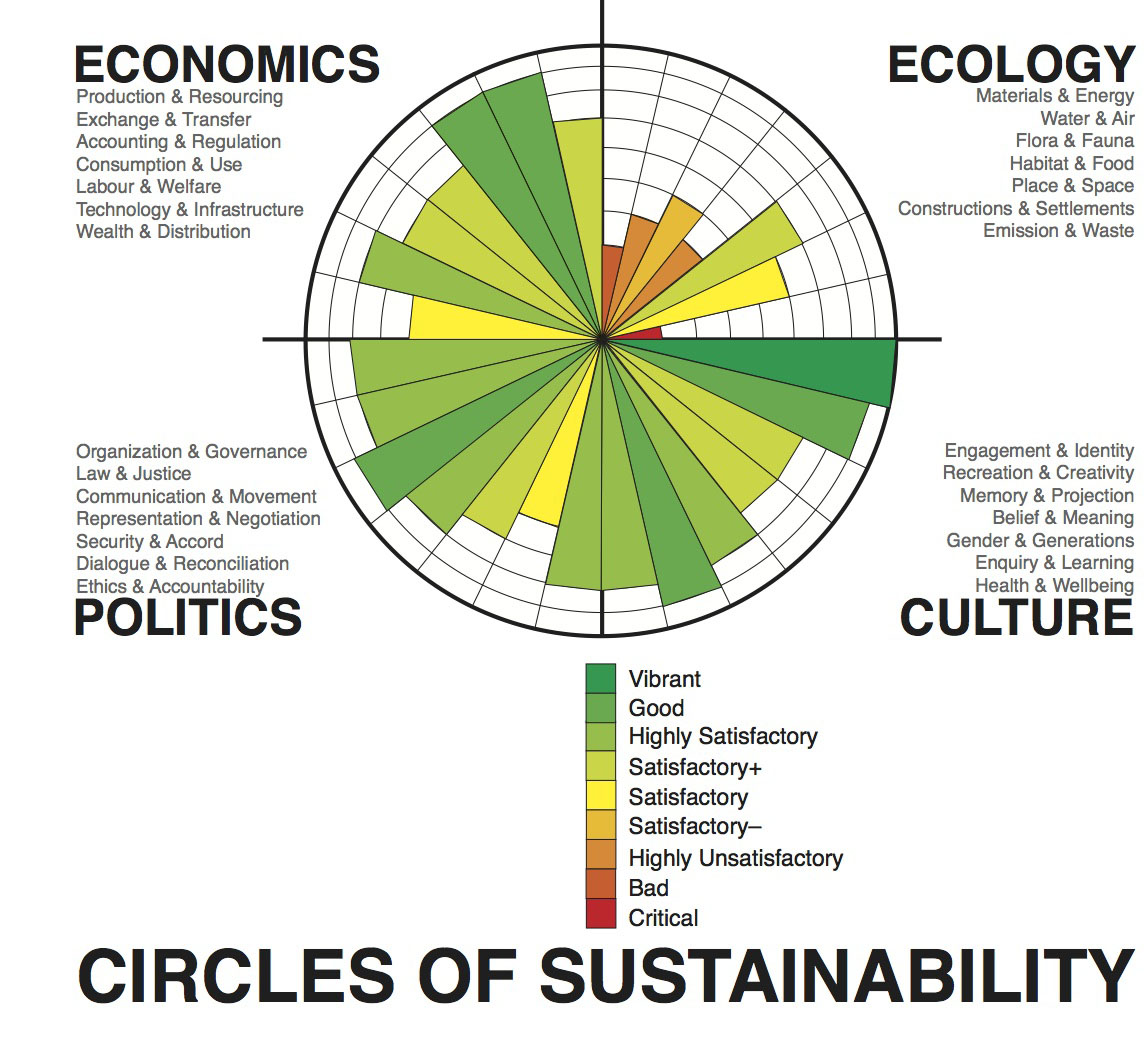
The Circles of Sustainability visualization incorporates culture as a fourth pillar of sustainable development.

The Culture 21 is a tool to enhance the role of culture in urban policies and also a tool to make cultural issues the fourth pillar of sustainable development.

"Sustainability" in culture refers not only to the preservation of cultural heritage but also to incorporating the sustainable development mentality into everyday life.

The extensive work and activism undertaken by the Agenda 100 for culture led the UCLG Executive Bureau to head the preparation of the policy statement document "Culture: the Fourth Pillar of Sustainable Development", approved on 17 November 2010 in the framework of the World Summit of Local and Regional Leaders – 3rd UCLG World Congress, held in Mexico City. This document opens a new perspective and points to the relationship between culture and sustainable development through a dual approach: developing a solid cultural policy and advocating a cultural dimension in all public policies.

== Participation ==
Quebec has endorsed the Culture 21 model and released a development plan along these lines. Montreal has ratified the agenda and undertaken various actions including library restoration and the creation of new cultural institutions, including "Design Montréal". An NGO called "Culture Montréal" has formed to promote development of and access to culture. Montreal has been designated a "UNESCO City of design".

The Moroccan city Essaouira, according to mayor Asma Chaabi, has been incorporating culture into its implementation of Local Agenda 21 since the 1990s. She writes in the five-year review of Culture 21 that Essaouira has succeeded in its historic preservation goals through cooperation with the national ministry of culture and with UNESCO.
