= United Cities and Local Governments =

Organization for cities, local and regional governments

- Cités et Gouvernements Locaux Unis (in French); Ciudades y Gobiernos Locales Unidos (in Spanish)

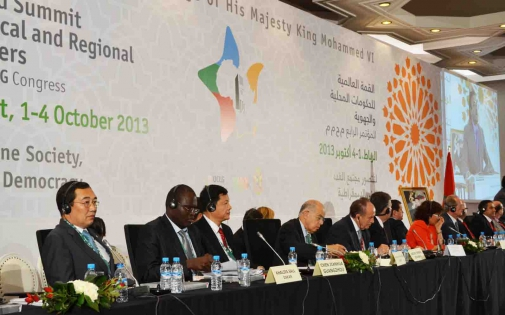
- UCLG Presidium during 2013 World Congress in Morocco, co-chaired by President Kadir Topbaş (Istanbul) & Treasurer Fathallah Oualalou (Rabat).
- Abbreviation: UCLG (in English); CGLU (in French); CGLU (in Spanish)
- Formation: 5 May 2004; 22 years ago
- Founded at: Paris
- Merger of: IULA, FMCU, Metropolis
- Type: International umbrella organization
- Purpose: Representing and defending the interests of local governments on the world stage
- Headquarters: Barcelona, Spain
- Region served: Worldwide
- Methods: Advocacy & dissemination of best practices
- Fields: Sustainable development goals: 1: No poverty; 3: Good health and well-being for people; 5: Gender equality; 6: Clean water & sanitation; 8: Decent work and economic growth; 11: Sustainable cities and communities; 13: Climate action; 17: Partnerships for the goals
- Members: over 240 000 members
- Official language: English, French, Spanish
- Secretary General: Emilia Saiz
- President: Uğur İbrahim Altay
- Co-President: Fatimetou Abdel Malick, Johnny Araya, Zhenis Kassymbek, Bheke Stofile, Berry Vrbanovic, Ye Niuping
- Special Envoys: Ada Colau & Carlos Martínez Mínguez
- Vice-President: Oumarou Dogari Moumoun, Ashok Kumar Byanju Shrestha, Aysen Nikolayev, Carola Gunnarsson, Yücel Yilmaz, Fernando Gray, Scott Pearce, Claudia López, Paola Pabón
- Board of directors: UCLG Executive Bureau
- Main organ: UCLG General Assembly
- Subsidiaries: 9 UCLG Sections & 19 Cross-sectional bodies: 4 UCLG Policy Councils; 4 UCLG Policy Committees; 2 UCLG Working Groups; 6 UCLG Communities of Practice; 3 UCLG Fora
- Affiliations: Global Taskforce of Local and Regional Governments, United Nations Advisory Committee of Local Authorities & UN ECOSOC's Development Cooperation Forum
- Website: www.uclg.org
- Remarks: Partners: Association of Netherlands Municipalities, C40 Cities Climate Leadership Group, Compact of Mayors, European Commission, ICLEI, OECD, UNICEF, United Nations Human Settlements Programme, UN-Water, UN Women, United Nations Office for Disaster Risk Reduction, World Bank, World Water Council

United Cities and Local Governments (UCLG) is an umbrella international organisation for cities, local and regional governments, and municipal associations.

The organization achieved inclusion of Goal 11: Sustainable cities and communities into Agenda 2030, aggregates best local practices into action plans, and provides regular updates on the progress and proposals to the High-level Political Forum on Sustainable Development. Its day-to-day activities include hosting meetings of mayors and other local and regional leaders, running joint projects with partners, organizing international peer-to-peer training on local policies and practices, and advocacy for the interests of local and regional governments at the UN.

Since its founding in 2004, UCLG is headquartered in Barcelona (the World Secretariat, Metropolis and UCLG Regions), with its regional offices in Brasília, Brussels, Istanbul, Jakarta, Kazan, La Paz, Ottawa and Rabat. It is the largest organization of sub-national governments in the world, with over 240,000 members in over 140 UN Member States, and understands itself as the united voice and world advocate of democratic local self-government, de facto representing over half the world's population across seven world regions: Africa, Asia-Pacific, Euroasia, Europe, Middle East & West Asia, Latin America and North America.

The organisation's work programme focuses on:

- Increasing the role and influence of local government and its representative organisations in global governance;
- Becoming the main source of support for democratic, effective, innovative local government close to the citizen;
- Ensuring an effective and democratic global organisation

== History ==
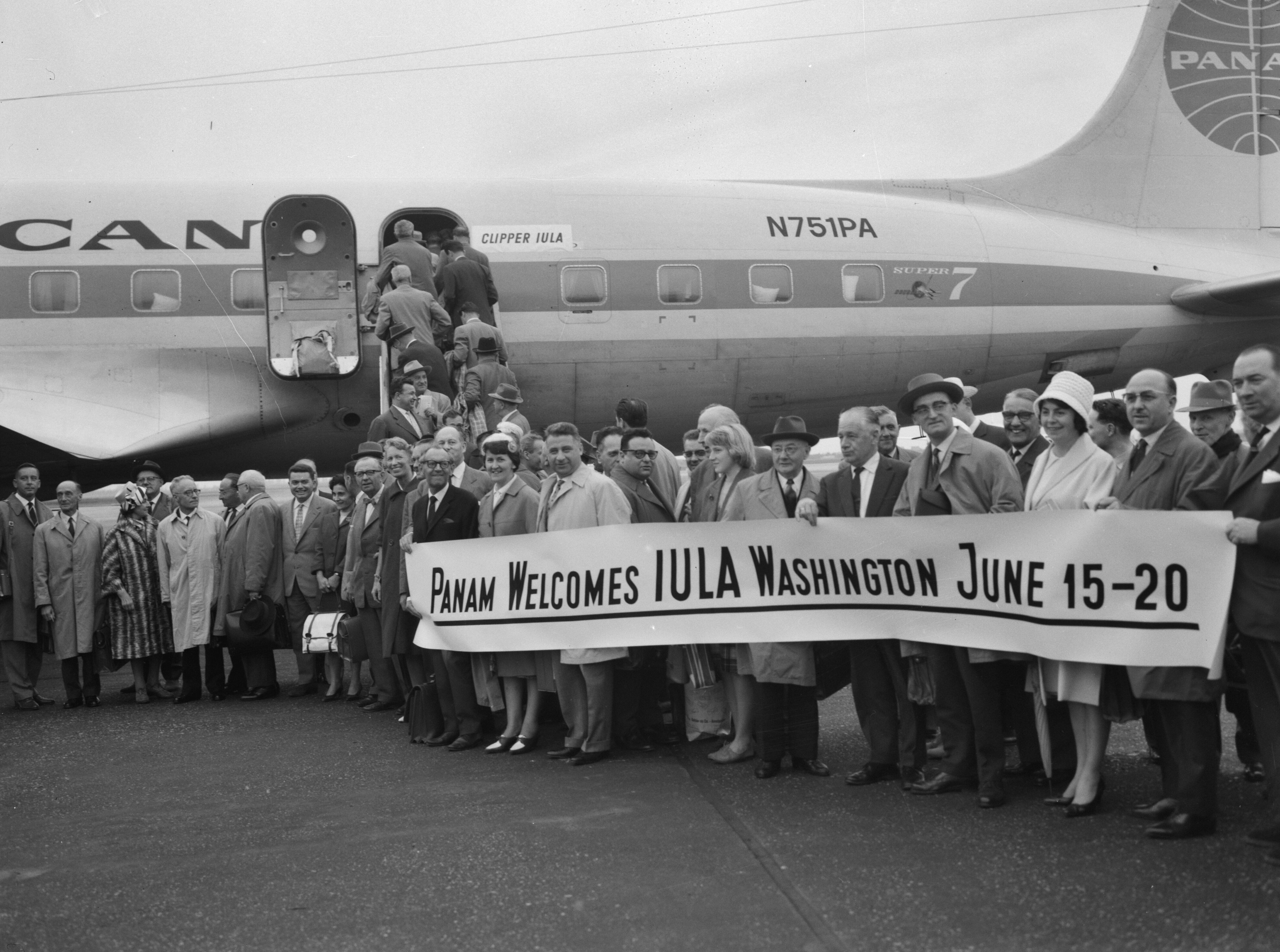
Pan Am welcomes a delegation of 10 mayors from the Netherlands (June 1961)

UCLG's origins go back to 1913, when the Union Internationale des Villes (UIV) was set up at the International Congress of the Art of Building Cities and Organising Community Life in Ghent, Belgium. The establishment of the UIV, a permanent office for communication and documentation on municipal issues, marked the birth of the international municipal movement. The association had a Provisional Council of 30 members and its first seat was in Brussels. In 1928, the UIV changed its name to the International Union of Local Authorities (IULA). In 1948, IULA's secretariat moved from Ghent to The Hague in the Netherlands, where it remained until 2004. The United Towns Organisation (UTO) (French: Fédération mondiale des cités unies (FMCU)) was set up in 1957 in Aix-les-Bains, France. It was initially known as the World Federation of Twin Cities (French: Fédération mondiale des villes jumelées).

In 1984, then President of the Regional Council of Ile-de-France, Michel Giraud, convened the first Metropolis Congress. The constituent Congress of Metropolis was held in Montreal in April 1985, and was attended by 14 founding member cities:

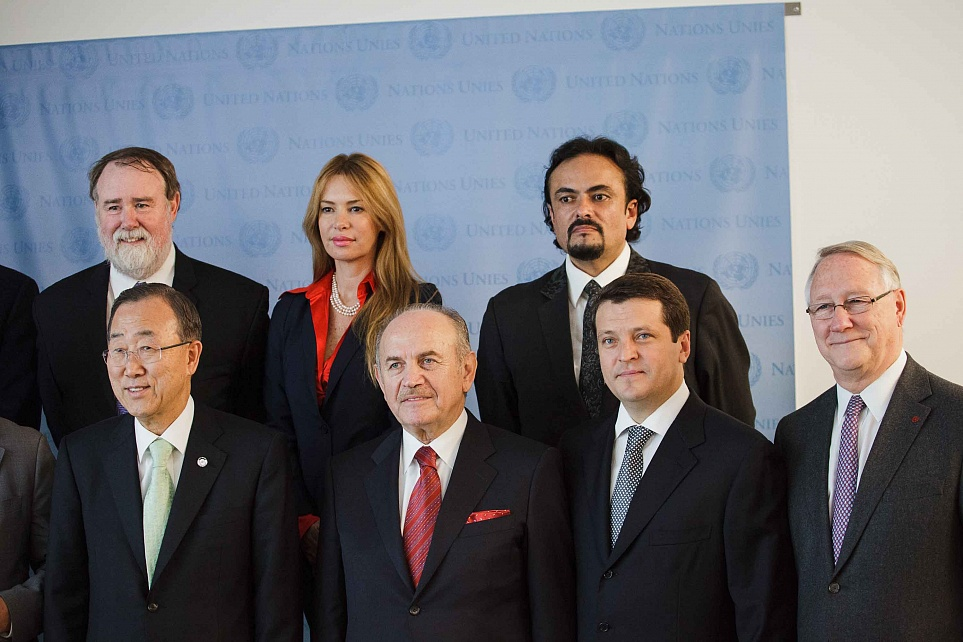
UCLG delegation led by Kadir Topbaş meeting with UN Secretary-General Ban Ki-moon at UN, 23 April 2012.

Abidjan, Addis Ababa, Barcelona, Buenos Aires, Cairo, Colombo, Ile-de-France, London, Los Angeles, Mexico, Montreal, New York, Tokyo and Turin. The Metropolis secretariat was initially established in Montreal, moving to Barcelona under the presidency of then Mayor of Barcelona, Joan Clos, in 2000. In 2004, three international associations of local and regional governments – the International Union of Local Authorities (IULA), United Towns Organisation (UTO), and Metropolis – agreed to come together to form a single organization at UCLG's founding congress.

The united organization started under the leadership of its founding President Bertrand Delanoë, mayor of Paris, serving two three-year terms (2004-2010) and continued under Kadir Topbaş of Istanbul (2010-2016).

== Organization and membership ==
UCLG is a membership organization with a democratic, federal structure. Its members include individual local and regional governments and their national associations. UCLG's governing bodies are made up of locally elected leaders, chosen by their peers in elections by UCLG members.

=== Sections ===
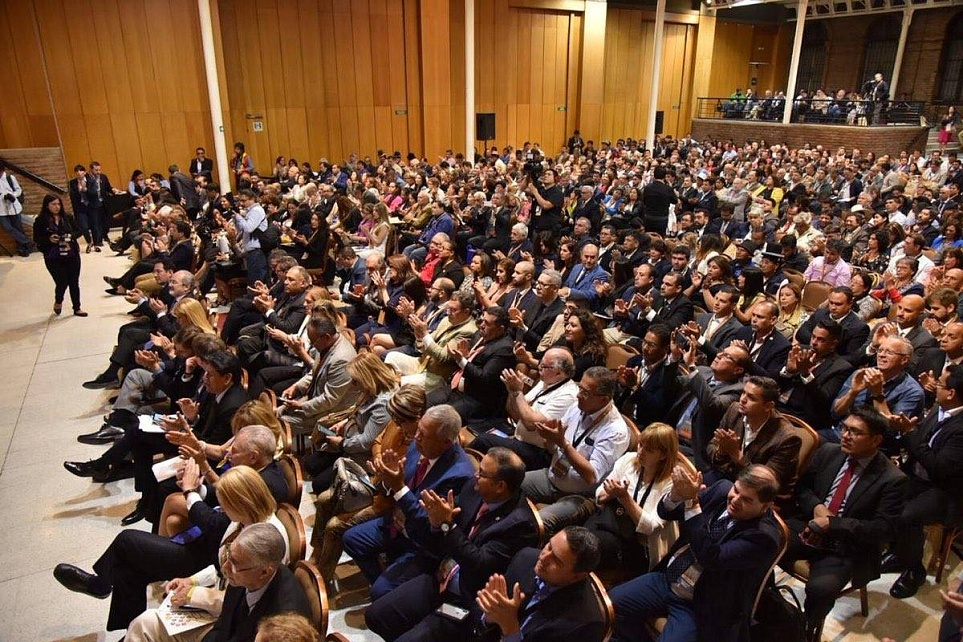
General Assembly of FLACMA-organized Latin American Congress of Local Authorities in Santiago de Chile (March 27–29, 2019).

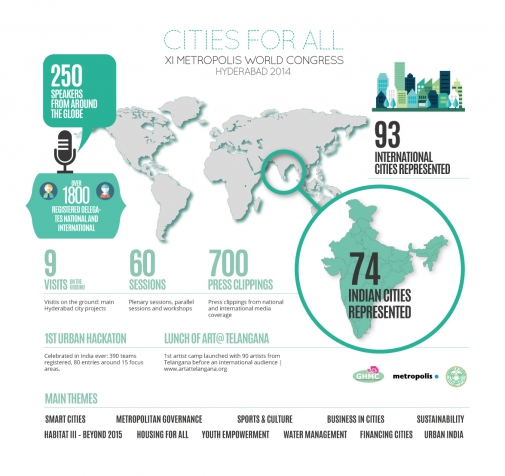
Overview slide with participants of 2014 Metropolis World Congress in Hyderabad, 6-10 Oct. 2014

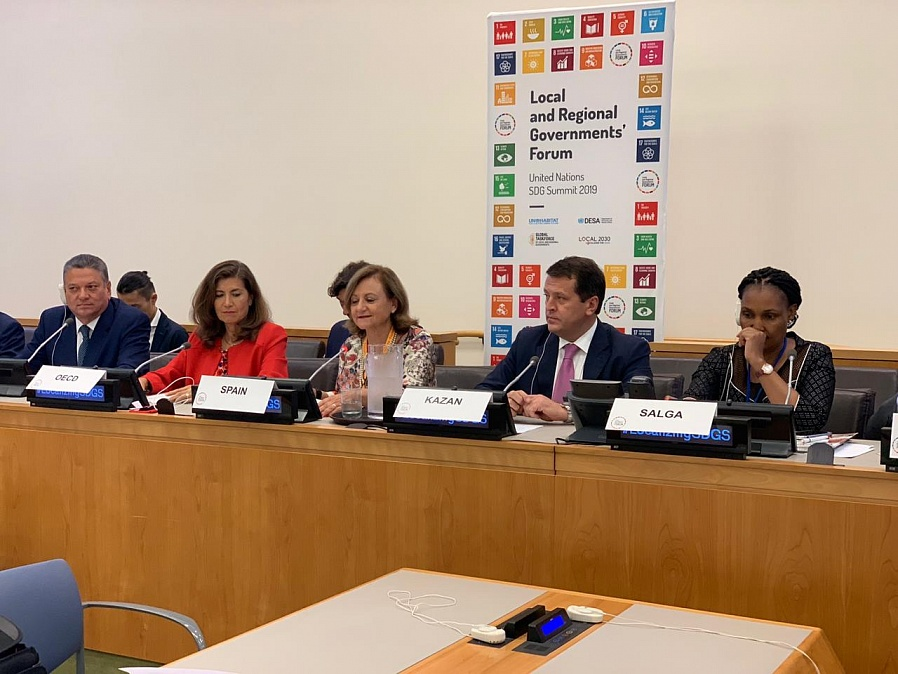
UCLG Euroasia President Mayor Metshin of Kazan speaking at UN GA Local and Regional Governments’ Forum NYC 24–25 September 2019

1. Africa Section (UCLG Africa)
2. United Cities and Local Governments Asia Pacific (UCLG-ASPAC)
3. Eurasia Section (UCLG Eurasia)
4. Europe Section - Council of European Municipalities and Regions (CEMR)
5. Middle East and West Asia Section
6. Latin American Coordination of Local Authorities for Unity in Diversity (CORDIAL, co-hosted by FLACMA & Mercosur Cities Network)
7. North America Section (UCLG - Noram, hosted by Federation of Canadian Municipalities)
8. Metropolitan Section (Metropolis)
9. Forum of Regions (UCLG Regions)

=== Governing bodies ===
==== World Council ====
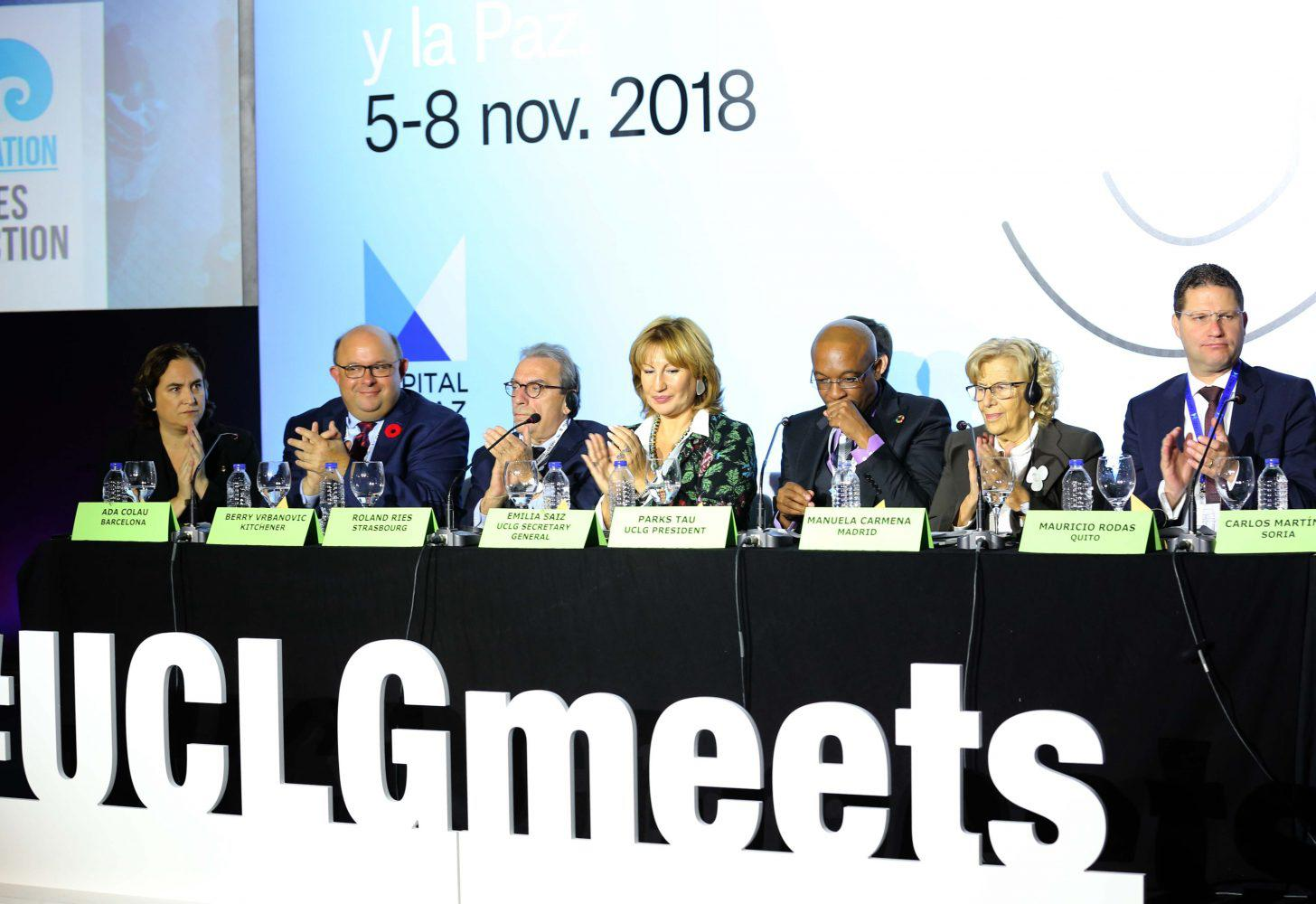
2018 UCLG World Council meeting in Madrid, 5-8 Nov. 2018.

UCLG's main policy-making body is the World Council. It has over 300 members from all world regions and meets no less than once every three years. Previous meetings were in Madrid (2018) & Hangzhou (2017).

==== Executive bureau ====
The UCLG Executive Bureau is made up of 115 members. It meets twice a year and makes proposals and carries out the decisions of the World Council.

==== Presidency ====
The presidency of the UCLG world network is made up of the president, six co-presidents and the treasurer, accompanied by two special envoys.

The presidency for the 2022-2026 period is:

The President of UCLG is Uğur Ibrahim Altay, Mayor of Konya.

Following the UCLG World Congress and World Summit of Local and Regional Leaders held in Daejeon in October 2026, the UCLG leadership came to an agreement to develop a collegial Presidency, with a rotating President for a mandate of one year, as follows:

Carolina Cosse, Mayor of Montevideo, year 1: from the Daejeon Congress to the end of 2023.

Uğur Ibrahim Altay, Mayor of Konya, year 2: end of 2023-end of 2024.

Jan Van Zanen, Mayor of The Hague, year 3: end of 2024-end of 2025.

Lee Jang-Woo, Mayor of Daejeon, year 4: from the end of 2025 to the 8th UCLG Congress at the end of 2026. Treasurers:

- Asmaa Rhlalou, Mayor of Rabat

Special Envoy of the Presidency to the New Urban Agenda: Carlos Martínez Mínguez, Mayor of Soria (Spain) Special Envoy to the Freedom, Solidarity and Fighting Violence against Local Political Leaders: Carola Gunnarsson, City Councillor of Sala Special Envoy to the Special Envoy for Food Systems: Mohamed Sefiani, Mayor of Chefchaouen

Ambassadors of the Pact for the Future

Ada Colau, City Councillor of Barcelona, as Ambassador for the Future of People.

Anne Hidalgo, Mayor of Paris, as Ambassador for the Future of the Planet.

Yücel Yilmaz, Mayor of Balikesir, as Ambassador for the Future of Government.

==== World Secretariat ====
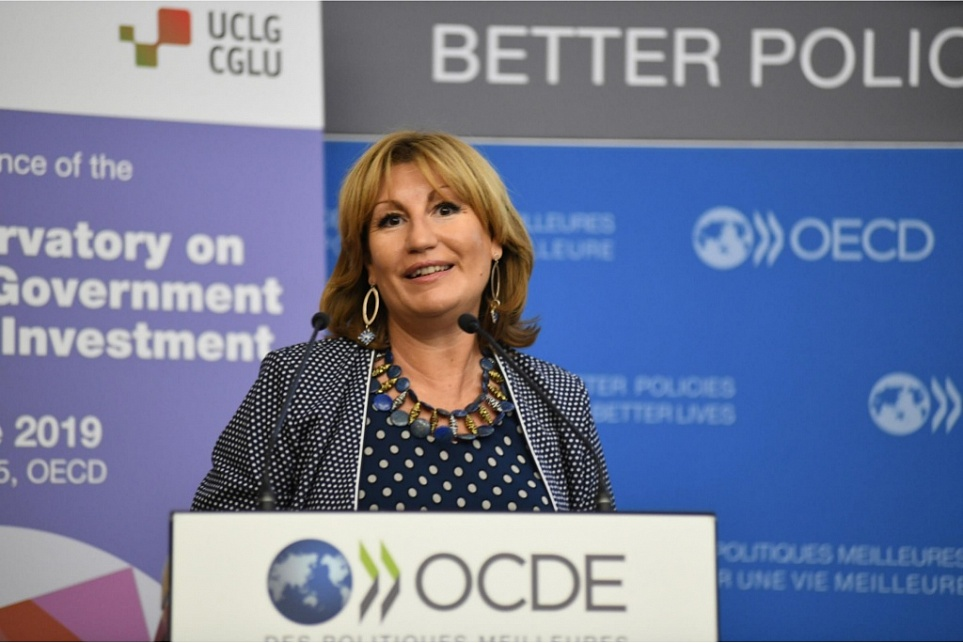
UCLG Secretary-General Emilia Saiz at the launch conference of the joint OECD-UCLG World Observatory on Sub National Finance and Investment, held in Paris on June 17, 2019.

Current UCLG Secretary-General is Emilia Saiz, who was named in December 2017 to replace outgoing Josep Roig.

=== Cross-sectional deliberative bodies ===
There are 19 permanent UCLG Cross-sectional bodies.

==== Policy councils ====
There are four UCLG policy councils:

- Right to the City and Inclusive Territories
- Opportunities for All, Culture and City Diplomacy: Keys to Sustainable Development and Peace
- Territorial Multilevel Governance and Sustainable Financing
- Safer, Resilient and Sustainable Cities, Capable of Facing Crises

Each Policy Council can have up to 15 representatives with a political mandate, with at least one member of the Presidency. These report at each Executive Bureau session.

==== Policy committees ====
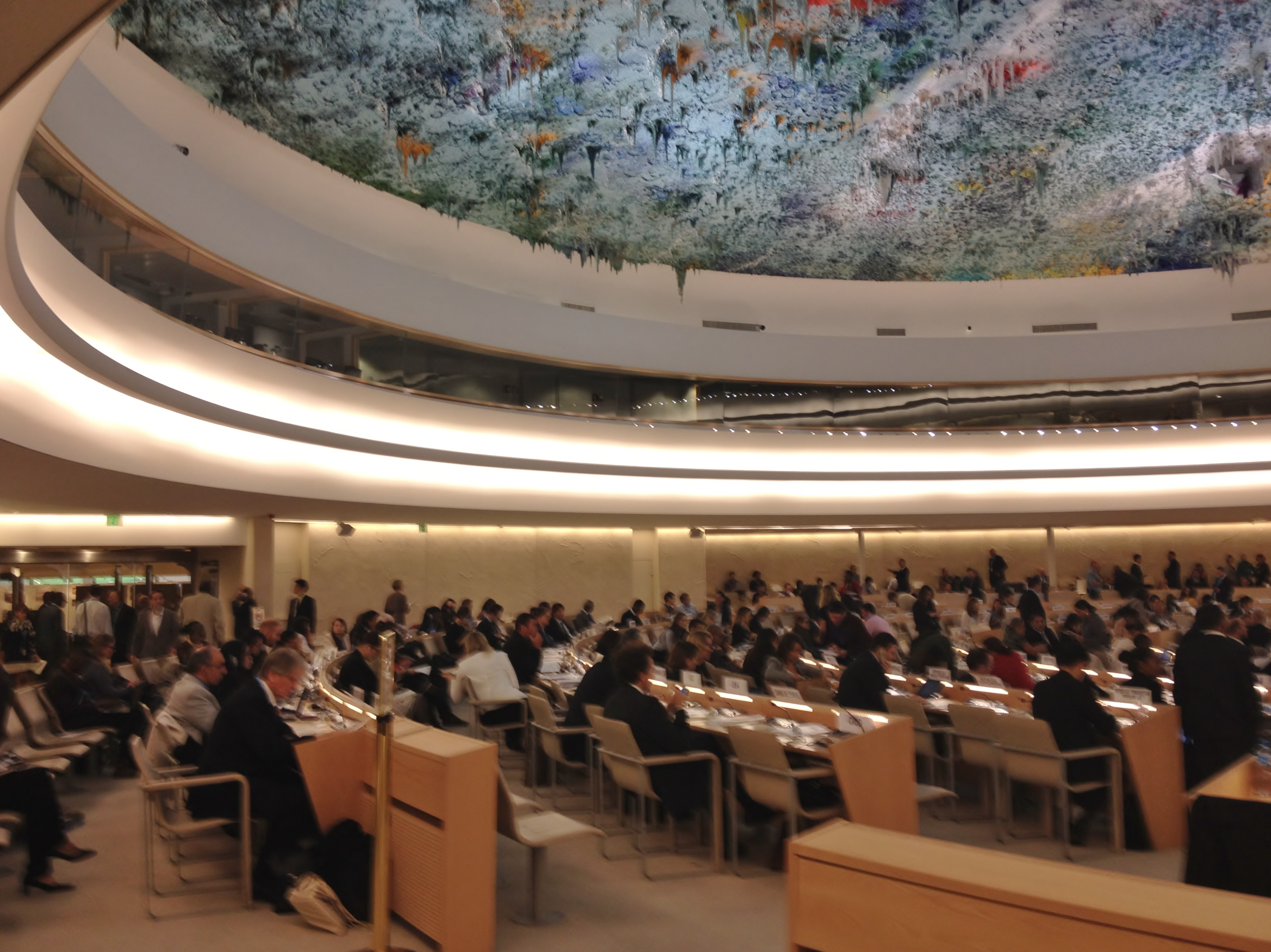
Patrick Braouezec, co-president of the Committee on Social Inclusion, Participative Democracy and Human Rights addressing the United Nations Human Rights Council, Presentation of the report on the "Role of local governments in promoting and protecting human rights", September 22, 2015. The Human Rights and Alliance of Civilizations Room, Palace of Nations in Geneva, Switzerland.

There are four UCLG policy committees:

- Culture
- Social Inclusion, Participatory Democracy and Human Right
- Urban Strategic Planning
- Local Economic and Social Development

==== Working groups ====
There are two UCLG working groups:

- Capacity and Institution Building
- Territorial Prevention and Management of Crises

==== Communities of practice ====
There are six UCLG communities of practice:

- Urban Innovation
- Mobility
- Social Economy
- Food Security
- Transparency and Accountability
- Digital Cities

==== Fora ====
There are three UCLG Ffora:

- Intermediary Cities
- Peripheral Cities
- Local Government Associations

== Events ==
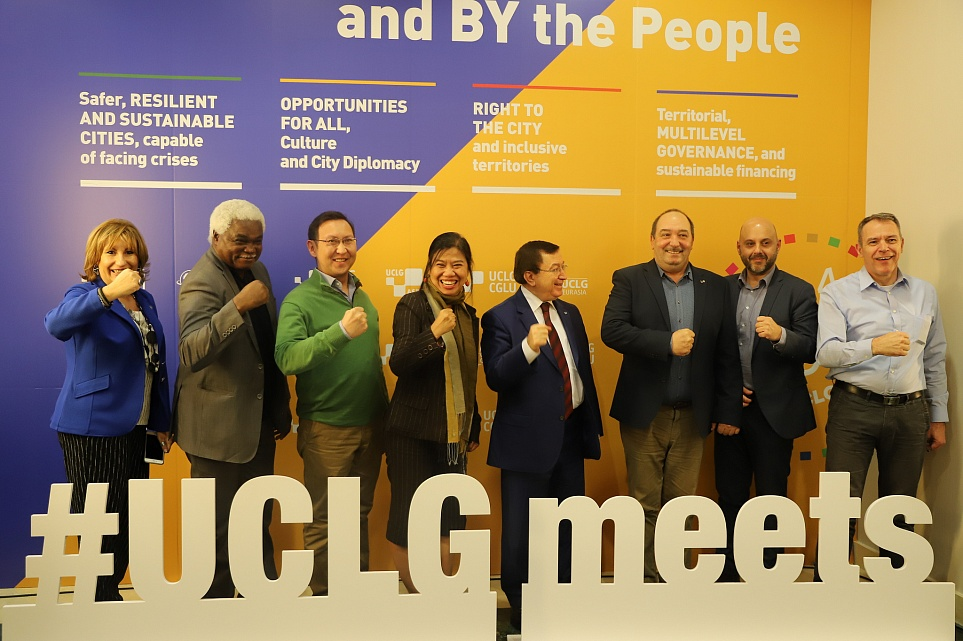
UCLG Retreat in Barcelona: World and Regional Secretaries-General planning the work ahead.

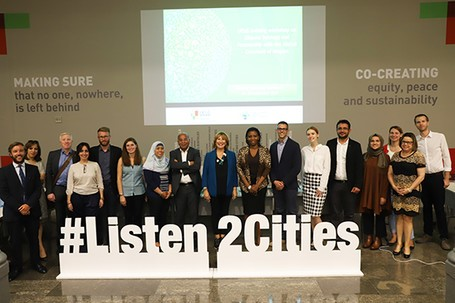
UCLG and Global Covenant of Mayors' (GCoM) joint workshop on Climate Action

UCLG meets for World Summits, regular Congresses, Executive Bureau meetings & Reunions, organized by the World Secretariat & UCLG Sections. It also organizes various seminars and trainings.

== Projects ==
=== Global Taskforce of Local and Regional Governments (GTF) ===
UCLG facilitates the Global Taskforce of Local and Regional Governments (GTF), a coordination and consultation mechanism that brings together the major international networks of local governments to undertake joint advocacy work relating to global policy processes. The Global Taskforce was set up in 2013 to bring the perspectives of local and regional governments to the SDGs, climate change agenda and New Urban Agenda, in particular. As well as UCLG, Global Taskforce participants include ICLEI and C40 Cities.

=== United Nations Advisory Committee of Local Authorities (UNACLA) ===
The United Nations Advisory Committee of Local Authorities (UNACLA) was established by the UN Habitat Governing Council Resolution 17/18 of 1999 as an advisory body to strengthen the dialogue of the UN System with local authorities in relation to the implementation of the Habitat Agenda. UCLG chairs UNACLA and holds 10 of its 20 seats. UCLG co-hosts the UNACLA secretariat with UN-Habitat.

== See also ==
- Agenda 21 for culture
