= Diego Miranda Méndez =

Costa Rican historian and politician (born 1990)

- Miranda in 2026

Mayor of San José
- Incumbent
- Assumed office 1 May 2024
- Preceded by: Johnny Araya Monge

San José Municipal Councillor
- In office 1 May 2016 – 30 April 2024

Personal details
- Born: Luis Diego Miranda Méndez; 2 January 1990 (age 36) Zapote, Costa Rica
- Party: Juntos por San José (since 2020)
- Other political affiliations: Broad Front
- Education: University of Costa Rica (BA)

Luis Diego Miranda Méndez (born 2 January 1990) is a Costa Rican historian and politician who has served as Mayor of San José since 2024. He previously served as a municipal councillor of San José from 2016 to 2024.

== Career ==
Diego Miranda was born in Zapote, on 2 January 1990. He studied history at the University of Costa Rica. As of 2024, he was pursuing a master's degree in anti-corruption policies at the University of Salamanca.

Diego Miranda joined the San José Municipal Council at 26 years old, being the youngest councillor in Costa Rica, in 2016. He was re-elected as councillor in 2020. During his two terms as councillor, Miranda was characterized by his vocal opposition to then-mayor of San José Johnny Araya Monge, who had led the canton for three decades.

Miranda announced his candidacy for Mayor of San José in 2023 under the local party Juntos por San José, and won the election on 5 February 2024, receiving 24.36% of the popular vote.
