= 2016 San José mayoral election =

- 7 February 2016
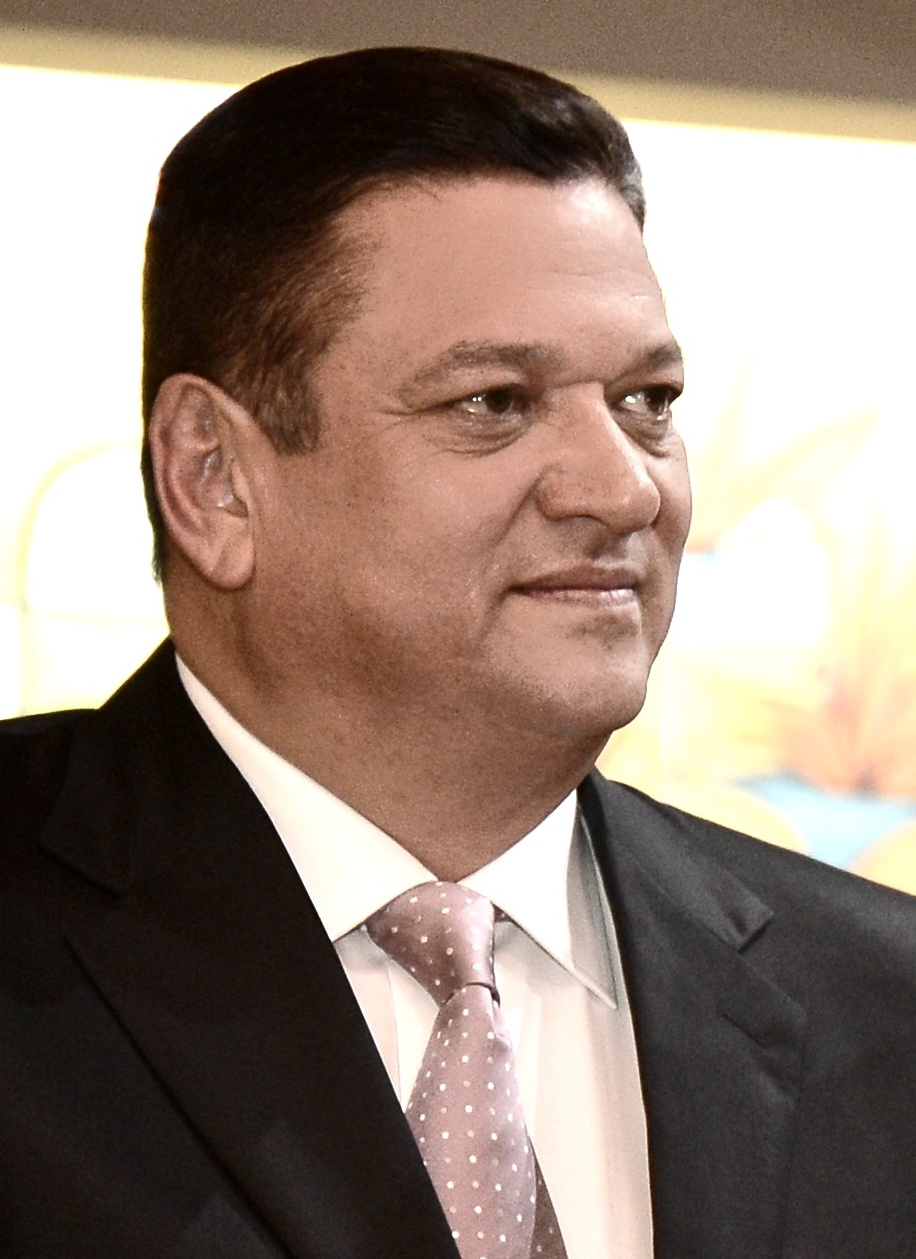

Candidate	Johnny Araya Monge	Guido Granados Ramírez
Party	San José Alliance	PLN
Popular vote	23 925	9536
Percentage	40.01%	15.95%
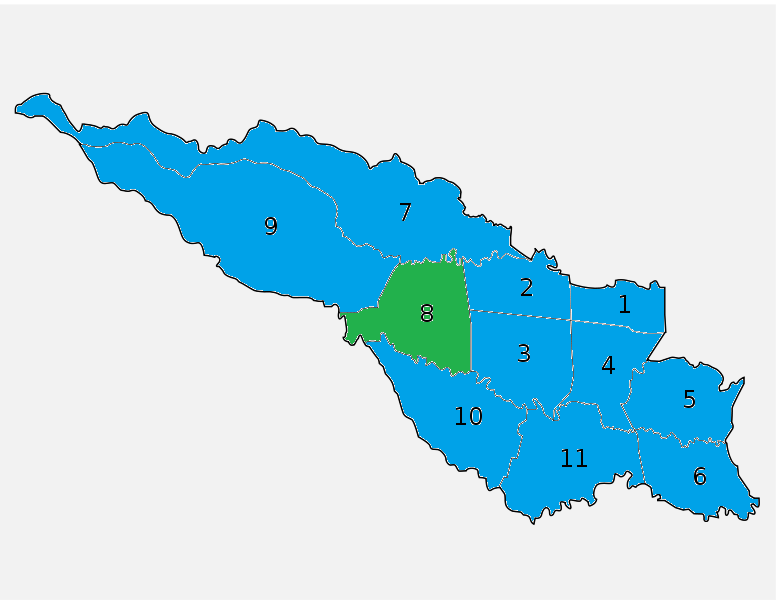
- In blue districts won by Araya, in green by Granados
Mayor before election
Sandra García Pérez
PLN
Elected Mayor
Johnny Araya Monge
San José Alliance

Mayoral and municipal elections were held in San Jose, Costa Rica, on 7 February 2016 and were the method by which the citizens of the canton of San José elected the mayor, deputy mayors, syndics, aldermen and district councilors of the capital municipality. For the first time the elections of aldermen (traditionally elected at the same time as the president and the deputies) were joined by the other municipal authorities after the 2009 reform to the Municipal Code. This was the fourth time that the Josefinos chose the Mayor of San José. The winner was former presidential candidate Johnny Araya Monge with more than 40% of the votes, followed by Guido Granados of the National Liberation Party with 16% and the ex-deputy Jorge Eduardo Sánchez of the Social Christian Unity Party with 10%.

== Candidates ==
Araya, who was mayor of San José since 2002 (and Municipal Executive, the figure that was his equivalent and was not popular election, since 1998) resigned his position to be a presidential candidate for the National Liberation Party in the national elections of 2014, being defeated. Unable to aspire to be candidate on his own party since the Ethics Tribunal suspended him for questioning his conduct during the campaign, Araya registered his candidacy through the cantonal party Alianza por San José.

In other parties the election of the candidate was also controversial. The Cantonal Assembly of the governing Citizens' Action Party elected as candidate alderman Daguer Alberto Hernandez Vasquez, however, his candidacy was not initially ratified by the National Assembly. The nomination was ratified in a second Cantonal Assembly for which the Citizen Action Party finally endorsed it. In the Social Christian Unity Party there were two precandidates: the ex-deputy Jorge Eduardo Sánchez Sibaja and Douglas Quesada Altamirano (who had previously been a candidate for mayor by the Libertarian Movement), however, Altamirano ran for the Social Christian Republican Party, a splinter of the PUSC founded by dissident Calderonismo and which has the backing of former President Rafael Ángel Calderón Fournier.

In the National Liberation Party, Guido Granados, husband of then interim mayor Sandra Garcia, was elected mayoral nominee with 60 votes out of 95 of the Cantonal Assembly in a second vote after obtaining 48 votes in the first count, insufficient to be elected. The remaining votes were obtained by the ex-deputy Óscar Alfaro. The other aspirants the former vice minister Luis Álvarez and the vice-mayor Gonzalo Ramírez were out of the second round.

Former Ombudsman, deputy and twice presidential candidate (in 2006 by the National Union Party and in 2014 by the National Advance Party) José Manuel Echandi Meza ran for the National Integration Party.

== Results ==
Candidate	Party	Votes	%
Johnny Araya Monge	San José Alliance	23,925	40.01
Guido Granados Ramírez	National Liberation Party	6,610	15.95
Jorge Eduardo Sánchez Sibaja	Social Christian Unity Party	6,322	10.57
Douglas Quesada Altamirano	Social Christian Republican Party	3,602	6.2
Israel Guillen González	Broad Front	3,503	5.86
José Manuel Echandi Meza	National Integration Party	3,399	5.68
Daguer Alberto Hernandez Vasquez	Citizens' Action Party	3,191	5.34
Vanessa Mayela Calvo González	Libertarian Movement	2,051	3.43
Roberto Arturo Barrantes Guerrero	Solidarity	1,609	2.69
Gustavo Adolfo Ortiz Barrionuevo	New Generation Party	1,032	1.73
Marco Antonio Arroyo Jiménez	Costa Rican Renewal Party	786	1.31
Fernando Alexis Castillo Villanueva	Forces United for Change	523	0.27
Fernando Alexis Castillo Villanueva	Worker's Party	313	0.52
Source: TSE
