= Mayor of San José, Costa Rica =

Costa Rican political office

Mayor of San José

- Incumbent; Diego Miranda Méndez since 1 May 2024
- Residence: Municipal Building José Figueres Ferrer
- Term length: Four years
- Constituting instrument: Municipal Code of Costa Rica
- Formation: 1998
- First holder: Johnny Araya Monge
- Website: Mayor's Office

The Mayor of San José is the general administrator and legal representative of the Municipality of San José, the capital of the Republic of Costa Rica and the largest and most populated municipality in the country. The position officially exists since the municipal reform of 1998 as part of the bipartisan agreements of the Figueres-Calderón Pact. Before this the municipalities were administered by a figure similar to a general manager appointed by the Municipal Council and called Municipal Executive, but after the reform this figure disappears replaced by the popularly elected mayor.

The longest serving person in the office has been Johnny Araya Monge of the National Liberation Party, who was previously municipal executive for several consecutive periods and who has served for more than 22 years (if the time he was a municipal executive) is included.

== List ==
=== Municipal Executives ===
#	Name	Term	Party	Notes
-	Matilde Marín Chinchilla	1970-1971	National Liberation Party	Governor of San José Province, assumed office with surcharge as Municipal Executive after the 1998 Municipal Code reform was enacted, resigned in 1971.
1	Vidal Quirós Berrocal	1971-1972	National Liberation Party	
2	Matilde Marín Chinchilla	1972-1973	National Liberation Party	
-	Roberto Mora Gagini	1973-1974	National Liberation Party	Named by Municipal Council to finish Marín's term.
3	Johnny Ramírez Azofeifa	1974-1978	National Liberation Party	
4	Rolando Araya Monge	1978-1980	National Liberation Party	Brother of Johnny Araya. Resigns from the office to occupy a ministerial portfolio in his uncle's administration.
5	Johnny Ramírez Azofeifa	1980-1985	National Liberation Party	Substitutes Araya, resigns in 1985 to be deputy.
6	Victorino Venegas Sibaja	1985-1990	National Liberation Party	
7	Omar Rojas Donato	1990-1991	National Liberation Party	Destituted by the Council, replaced by Johnny Araya.
8	Johnny Araya Monge	1991-1998	National Liberation Party	

=== Mayors ===
#	Name	Term	Party	Notes
1	Johnny Araya Monge	1998-2013	National Liberation Party	First democratically elected mayor. Consecutively re-elected in the 2002, 2006 and 2010 elections. Resigns in 2013 to be unsuccessfully presidential candidate for the 2014 Costa Rican general election.
-	Sandra García Pérez	2013-2016	National Liberation Party	Vice-mayor, substitutes Araya.
1	Johnny Araya Monge	2016-2020	San José Alliance Party	Re-elected in 2016.
1	Johnny Araya Monge	2020-2024	National Liberation Party	Re-elected in 2020.
1	Diego Miranda Méndez	2024-	Together for San José Party	Elected in 2024.

== See also ==
- List of mayors in Costa Rica
- Local government in Costa Rica
