= Local government in Costa Rica =

Costa Rica’s municipal system is organized under the Municipal Code, the specific law that regulates the local governments. Municipalities are the second-level administration in Costa Rica after the central government. Each one of the 82 cantons of Costa Rica has a Municipality or Municipal Government constituted by a mayor and a proportional number of members of the Municipal Council. Districts of each of the cantons also have their local authorities and representatives. Some of the services manage by local governments include; solid waste management, building and administration of local roads, parks, libraries and schools, recollection of municipal taxes and in some cases local security. Worth noticing that in Costa Rica city and municipality are not the same thing, as a canton can have several cities within its borders, generally as districts.

== History ==
Costa Rica’s first local government was Garcimuñoz Castle, founded in 1561 by Costa Rica’s conqueror Juan de Cavallón. In 1564 Juan Vazquez de Coronado moved the local government from Garcimuñoz to El Guarco and called it Cartago. 1813 there were 15 local governments in Costa Rica known as Cabildos, including those of the main cities; San José, Alajuela, Cartago and Heredia. In 1867 the first laws are enacted that gave local governments certain autonomy and power over local decisions. After the independence from Spain the position of the governments varies, as some presidents are more centralist and some others are more supportive of local rule. The 1825 Constitution establishes that every town should have a local government no matter how small it was. Yet, this was eliminated during Braulio Carrillo's dictatorship in 1841 as it was seen as a treat toward the central authority.

The 1848 Constitution creates the figure of Provincial Municipal Council or Cabildo in each of the provincial capitals of the then five provinces; San José, Alajuela, Cartago, Heredia and Guanacaste and in the then Comarca of Puntarenas. These bodies were integrated by three democratically elected members and a Political President appointed by the Executive Branch and considered the maximum authority in the province. The presidential decrees of 1862 and 1867 known as "Ordenanzas Municipales" allowed the minor cantons to choose representatives to the provincial cabildos. These "Ordenanzas" remained until the promulgation of the Municipal Code in 1970, but the 1949 Constitution acknowledges the right of the cantons to have municipal autonomy and self-government. A massive reform was made of the Municipal Code in 1998 making all municipal offices democratically elected and eliminating all the appointed figures (like the Provincial Governor).

== Authorities ==
Each one of the 82 cantons of Costa Rica is govern by an elected Mayor, the first sub-national authorities since the elimination of provincial governors in 1998. Mayors are democratically elected alongside two deputy mayors. Up until 1998 the equivalent figure was called “Municipal Executive” and was appointed by the Municipal Council but a reform in the Municipal Code made the office of popular election.

Also, each canton has a Municipal Council conformed by councilmen/women named “regidores”. The function of the Municipal Council is similar to that of a local parliament; approving the Municipality’s budget, bylaws, projects and checking the Mayor’s actions and is considered the maximum authority in the canton. The number of council members varies according to the canton’s population; the least populated cantons have five members and there’s no maximum but currently the most populated cantons like San Jose and Alajuela have eleven members. Each of the tenure members have also a deputy councilmember that acts as substitute in case the tenure member is absent, deputy councilors can’t vote (unless, of course, if they are in substitution) but can speak in the Council and be members of commissions. A deputy councilor can only be substitute of a tenure councilor of the same political party. Members of the Municipal Council are not representative of any district; they can be elected from any of the canton's districts.

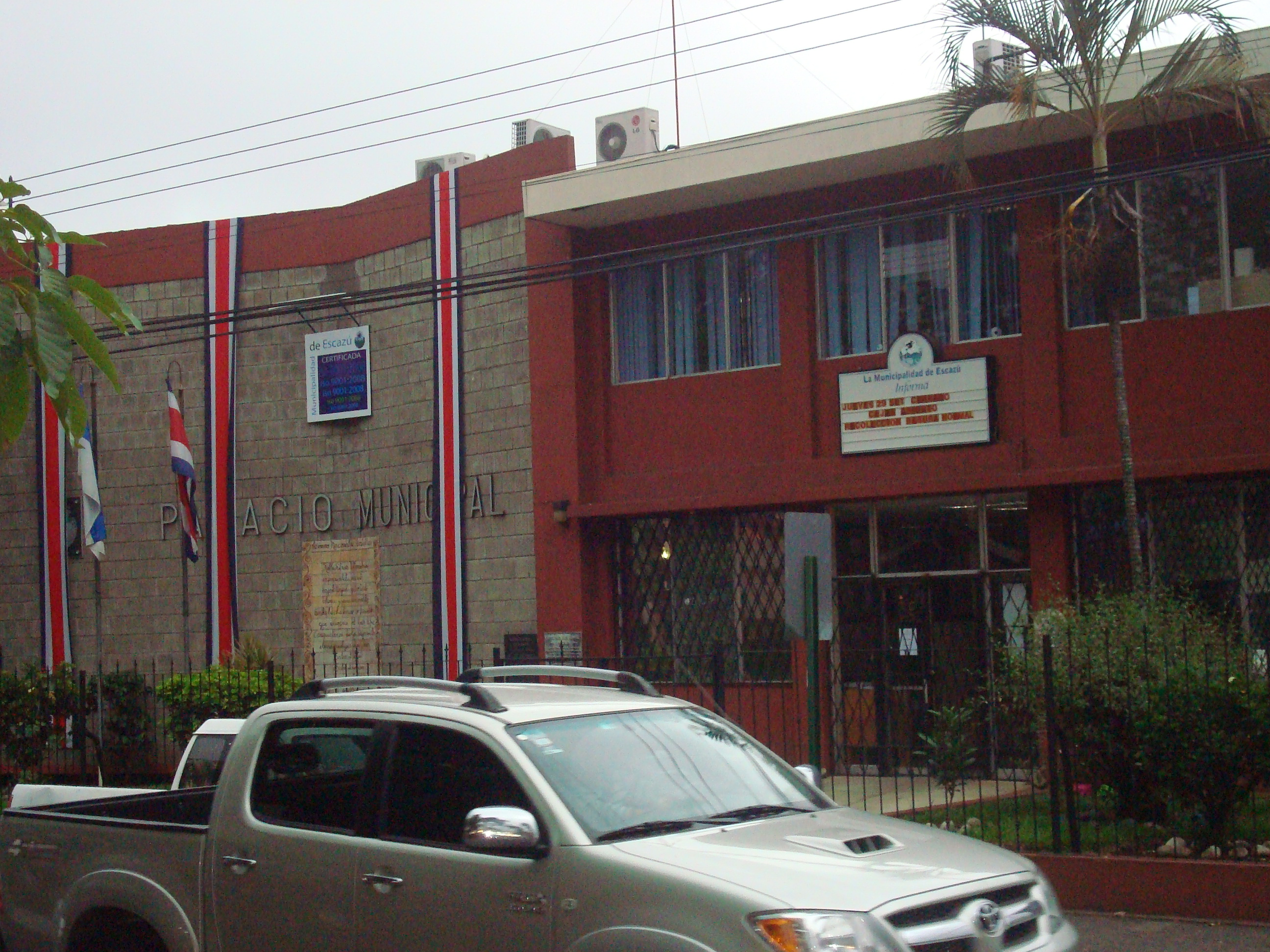
Escazú City Hall

Each of the canton’s districts also has a District Council. District Councils are always presided over by an elected Syndic and also have four other elected members or District Councilors with voice and vote in the District Council. There’s also a Deputy Syndic and Deputy District Councilors with voice but no vote unless they are acting substitutes in a similar dynamics of the Municipal Council. Syndics also can assist the Municipal Council and they can speak on behalf of their districts, but can’t vote.

In eight very specific districts that are considered too far away from the administrative center (because they are islands, mountain regions, etc.) the residents also elect an Intendant and a deputy Intendant, and their District Council is called Municipal District Council, having some special prerogatives that will normally be manage by the Municipality.

== Payments ==
Mayors and Deputy Mayors receive a salary proportional to the Municipality’s budget, as for example San José Mayor has a salary even superior to the President whilst mayors from smaller and poorer cantons receive a salary barely over the country's minimal wage. Councilors and Syndics receive only remuneration for their participation in the Municipal Council’s sessions, also proportional to the city’s budget but not a salary. Participation in District Councils is totally free and District Councilors do not receive any compensation nor the Syndic when chairing the sessions.

== Election ==
All these offices are democratically elected and all of them can opt for immediate re-election with no term limits. Terms are of four years and elected mid-way during the presidential term (two years after the national election). It is required to be a resident in the canton for at least two years to be candidate for Mayor and/or Municipal Council and in the district for the distrital offices. There is no age limit (someone after 18 can be candidate) or limit for naturalized citizens as far as they also have the two years residence, unlike other offices (as for example, there is a minimal age of 21 to be member of Congress and 20 years residence for naturalized citizens and an age limit of 30 years-old minimal to be President and be citizen by birth). Costa Rica’s electoral law does not allow independent candidates, every candidate has to be nominated by a legally established political party, thus a proliferation of local political parties is very common and most cantons have at least one local party. Currently the parties with the most mayors, councilors and syndics are National Liberation, Social Christian Unity and Citizens Action.
