= Mercosur Cities Network =

Network of municipalities in the Mercosur trade bloc

Mercosur flag

Mercosur Cities Network, or simply Mercocities, is a network that unites a group of municipalities of the countries that participate in the Common Market of the South (Mercosur), whether they are members or associates. This organization of cities aims to promote their integration on a regional scale and stimulate development and cooperation between them.

It currently comprises 353 municipalities of the following South American countries: Argentina, Brazil, Bolivia, Chile, Colombia, Ecuador, Paraguay, Peru, Uruguay and Venezuela.

== History ==
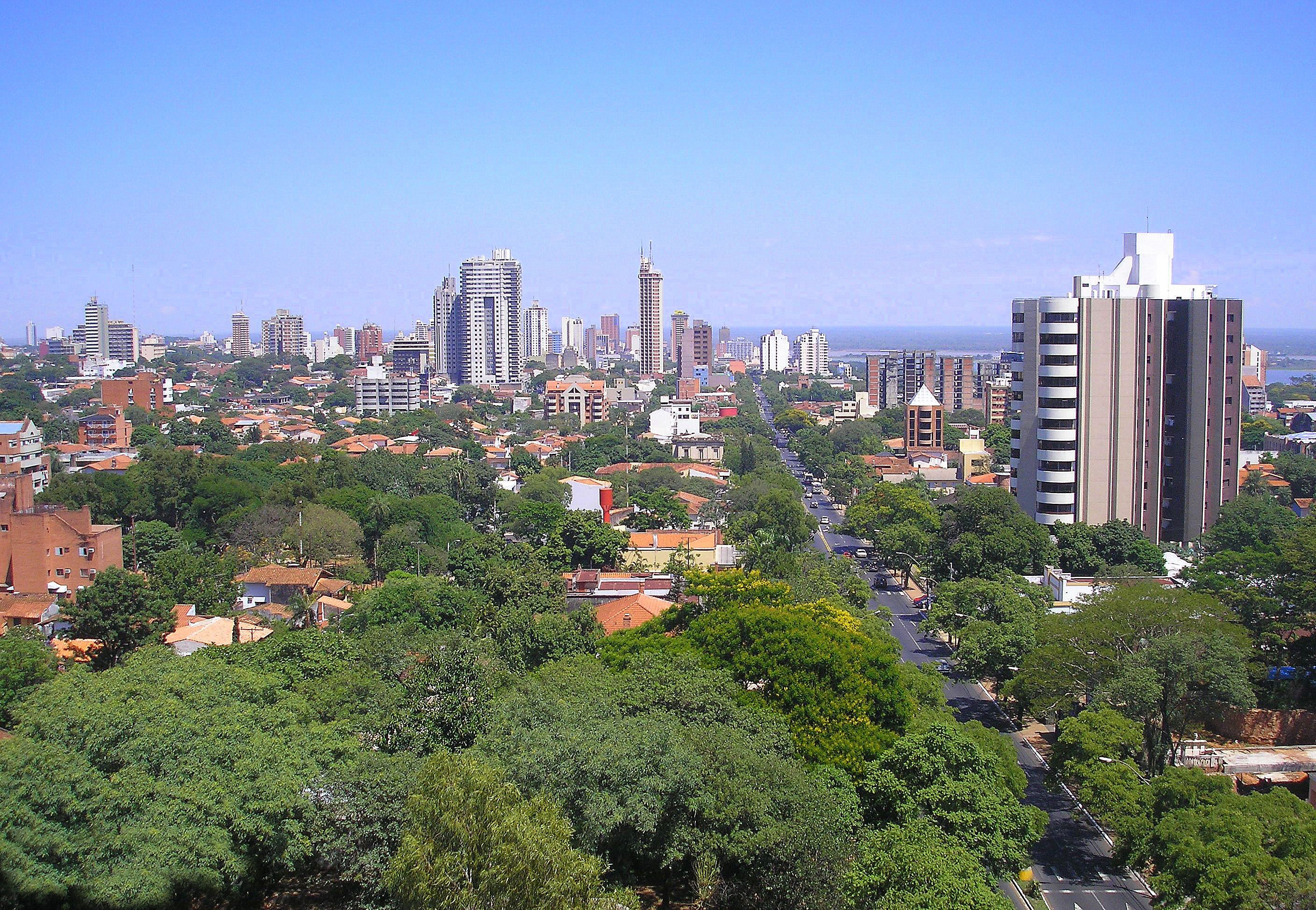
Asunción, Paraguay

The idea of creating a Mercosur association of cities came up during the seminar "Mercosur: Opportunities and Challenges for Cities" held in March 1995 in Asunción, Paraguay. The mayors who participated in the meeting, which was convened by the Union of Ibero-American Capital Cities–Southern Cone Sub-region, signed the so-called Declaration of Asuncion, where they expressed the need to create a forum for cooperation among municipalities.

In July 1995, the Porto Alegre Commitment (Brazil) was signed, which defined the main objectives of the new organization. Finally, in November of the same year, she signed the Founding Act of the Mercocities, in Asunción.

The founding members were the cities of Asunción, Rosario, La Plata, Cordoba, Buenos Aires, Florianópolis, Porto Alegre, Curitiba, Rio de Janeiro, Brasília, Salvador and Montevideo.

== Instances of Mercociudades ==
Art. 8 of the Statutes stated different instances of work:

=== Summit of Heads of Government ===
The Assembly is the highest body for deliberation and direction of our Network. It is made up of mayors, mayors and prefects of the associated cities and its sessions are led by the President of Mercociudades. It meets once a year at the Mercocities Summit. During the Assembly the annual Work Plan is approved, the authorities of that new period assume, and it is at the same time an instance of contact with various regional and world organizations interested in carrying out joint actions. The Assembly concludes with a political declaration.

=== Council of Mercociudades ===
It is the highest governing body between assemblies and is made up of two cities from each full member country of Mercosur and one city from each associated country, those that make up the Board of Directors and that which is exercised by the Executive Secretariat.

Council 2019–2020:

- Argentina: Buenos Aires, Córdoba, Santa Fe, Avellaneda (Santa Fe), General Alvear, Hurlingam, San Justo, Villa María
- Brazil: Foz de Iguazú, Porto Alegre, Santana de Parnaíba, Sāo Leopoldo, Sāo Paulo.
- Paraguay: Asunción, Itá and Lambaré.
- Uruguay: Canelones, Colonia, Lavalleja, Maldonado, Montevideo, Paysandú, San José and Tacuarembó.
- Bolivia: La Paz, Sucre and Tarija.
- Colombia: Medellín.
- Chile: Concepción, Coquimbo, Quilpué, Quilicura, Peñalolén, Puerto Montt and Valparaíso.
- Ecuador: Cuenca and Río Bamba.
- Peru: Los Aquijes, Parcona, Pueblo Nuevo, and Santiago de Ica.

=== Executive Direction ===
It is made up of three cities: the city that exercises the Executive Secretariat, the city that exercised it in the immediately preceding period, and the city that is close to exercising it. It is a support agency for the Executive Secretariat in the coordination work of the Network.

Executive Direction 2019-2020: Asuncion, La Paz and Tandil.

=== Presidency ===
As the official space of the Network, the Presidency works jointly with the various instances of Mercociudades, specifically convening and presiding over the work meetings of the Council, those of the Executive Directorate, and those of the General Assembly of Members. In each period, this Presidency carries out activities based on a work plan approved at the Network's annual summit.

President 2020: Oscar Rodriguez, Major of Asuncion, Paraguay.

=== Thematic Vice Presidencies ===
The thematic vice-presidencies participate with the right to speak and vote in the Executive Directorate, represent the Network in various regional and international spaces, and assist the President in his responsibilities. They articulate and mobilize the member cities, coordinators, or members of the thematic instances of Mercociudades, related to the thematic area they represent.

Thematic Vice Presidencies 2019-2020:

- Sustainable Urban Development And Climate Change: Esteban Echeverría (Argentina) And Prefeito De São Leopoldo (Brazil).
- Governance And Cultural Integration: La Paz (Bolivia).
- Institutional Relations: Montevideo (Uruguay).
- Urban Economy: Porto Alegre (Brazil).
- Social Development And Health: Tandil (Argentina).

=== Executive Secretary ===
As the official space of the Network, the Executive Secretariat works jointly with the various instances of Mercociudades, specifically convening and presiding over the work meetings of the Council, and those of the General Assembly of Partners. In each period, this Secretariat carries out activities based on a work plan approved at the Network's annual summit. Its mandate is for one year and begins from the date the General Assembly is held.

=== Collegiate of Coordinators of Thematic Units: Thematic Units ===
The thematic instances disseminate successful experiences, contribute to the formulation of public policies, and promote research. They arise responding to the need of the member cities of the Network to work in various areas of high concern and interest. Currently, it has 15 Thematic Units and 7 Work Groups and Commissions.

=== Permanent Technical Secretariat ===
The Permanent Technical Secretariat of Mercocities is based in Montevideo and is an advisory body to the Executive Secretariat. Its creation was due to the need to develop the institutional memory of the Network; support and advise the technical and administrative work of the Executive Secretariat; follow up on issues and discussions of the integration process, and liaise with the MERCOSUR Secretariat.

== Membership ==
The Mercocities are:

=== Argentina ===
- Almirante Brown
- Avellaneda
- Bahía Blanca
- Barranqueras
- Bovril
- Bragado
- Buenos Aires
- Capilla del Monte
- Carlos Pellegrini
- Cipolletti
- Comodoro Rivadavia
- Córdoba
- Daireaux
- Eduardo Castex
- Empedrado
- Esperanza
- Esteban Echeverría
- Firmat
- Florencio Varela Partido
- General San Martín Partido
- Gualeguaychú
- Guaymallén
- Hurlingham
- Junín
- Junín de los Andes
- La Matanza
- La Plata
- La Rioja
- Las Bandurrias
- Lomas de Zamora
- Luján
- Malvinas Argentinas
- Mar del Plata
- María Susana
- Mendoza
- Merlo, Buenos Aires
- Miramar
- Montecarlo
- Monte Caseros Department
- Moreno
- Morón
- Necochea
- Neuquén
- Olavarría
- Paraná
- Paso de los Libres Department
- Pergamino
- Piamonte
- Pilar
- Puerto San Julián
- Quilmes
- Rafaela
- Realicó
- Reconquista
- Resistencia
- Río Cuarto
- Río Grande
- Río Tercero
- Roque Sáenz Peña
- Rosario
- Salta
- Salto Partido
- San Antonio de los Cobres
- San Fernando del Valle de Catamarca
- San Isidro
- San Jorge
- San Juan
- San Lorenzo
- San Luis
- San Miguel de Tucumán
- San Salvador de Jujuy
- Santa Fe
- Santiago del Estero
- Tandil
- Trelew
- Ushuaia
- Vicente López
- Viedma
- Villa Gesell
- Villa María
- Villa Mercedes
- Virasoro
- Zapala
- Zárate

=== Bolivia ===
- Cochabamba
- El Alto
- La Paz
- Santa Cruz de la Sierra
- Sucre
- Tarija

=== Brazil ===
- Alvorada
- Anápolis
- Araraquara
- Barra do Ribeiro
- Bela Vista
- Belém
- Belo Horizonte
- Brasília
- Camaçari
- Campinas
- Caxias do Sul
- Contagem
- Coronel Sapucaia
- Cuiabá
- Curitiba
- Diadema
- Dourados
- Esteio
- Florianópolis
- Fortaleza
- Foz do Iguaçu
- Goiânia
- Gravataí
- Guaíra
- Guarulhos
- Indaiatuba
- Jacareí
- Joinville
- Juiz de Fora
- Limeira
- Londrina
- Macaé
- Mauá
- Maringá
- Mossoró
- Niterói
- Osasco
- Paranhos
- Penápolis
- Piracicaba
- Porto Alegre
- Praia Grande
- Recife
- Ribeirão Preto
- Rio Claro
- Rio de Janeiro
- Rio Grande
- Salvador
- Santa Maria
- Santana de Parnaíba
- Santa Vitória do Palmar
- Santo André
- Santos
- São Bento do Sul
- São Bernardo do Campo
- São Borja
- São Caetano do Sul
- São Carlos
- São José do Rio Preto
- São Leopoldo
- São Paulo
- São Vicente
- Sumaré
- Suzano
- Taboão da Serra
- Teresina
- Uberlândia
- Uberaba
- Várzea Paulista
- Viamão
- Vitória
- Vitória da Conquista

=== Chile ===
- Arica
- Calama
- Concepción
- Chillán Viejo
- El Bosque
- La Florida
- Los Andes
- Lota
- Pudahuel
- Puerto Montt
- Quilpué
- Rancagua
- Santiago
- Valparaíso
- Viña del Mar

=== Colommbia ===
- Bogotá
- Medellín
- Cali
- Barranquilla

=== Ecuador ===
- Cuenca

=== Paraguay ===
- Asunción
- Bella Vista Norte
- Capiatá
- Cambyretá
- Carlos Antonio López
- Concepción
- Coronel Oviedo
- Fernando de la Mora
- Hernandarias
- Horqueta
- Jesús de Tavarangüé
- Limpio
- Nanawa
- Pedro Juan Caballero
- Pilar
- Salto del Guairá
- San Lázaro
- San Pedro de Ycuamandiyú
- Villeta
- Ypehú

=== Peru ===
- Jesús María
- La Victoria
- Lima
- District Lurin

=== Uruguay ===
- Canelones
- Cerro Largo
- Colonia
- Durazno
- Flores
- Florida
- Maldonado
- Montevideo
- Paysandú
- Río Negro
- Rivera
- Rocha
- San José
- Salto
- Tacuarembó
- Treinta y Tres

=== Venezuela ===
- Barquisimeto
- Alcaldía Mayor de Caracas
- Cumaná
- Libertador
