= Johnny Araya Monge =

Costa Rican politician

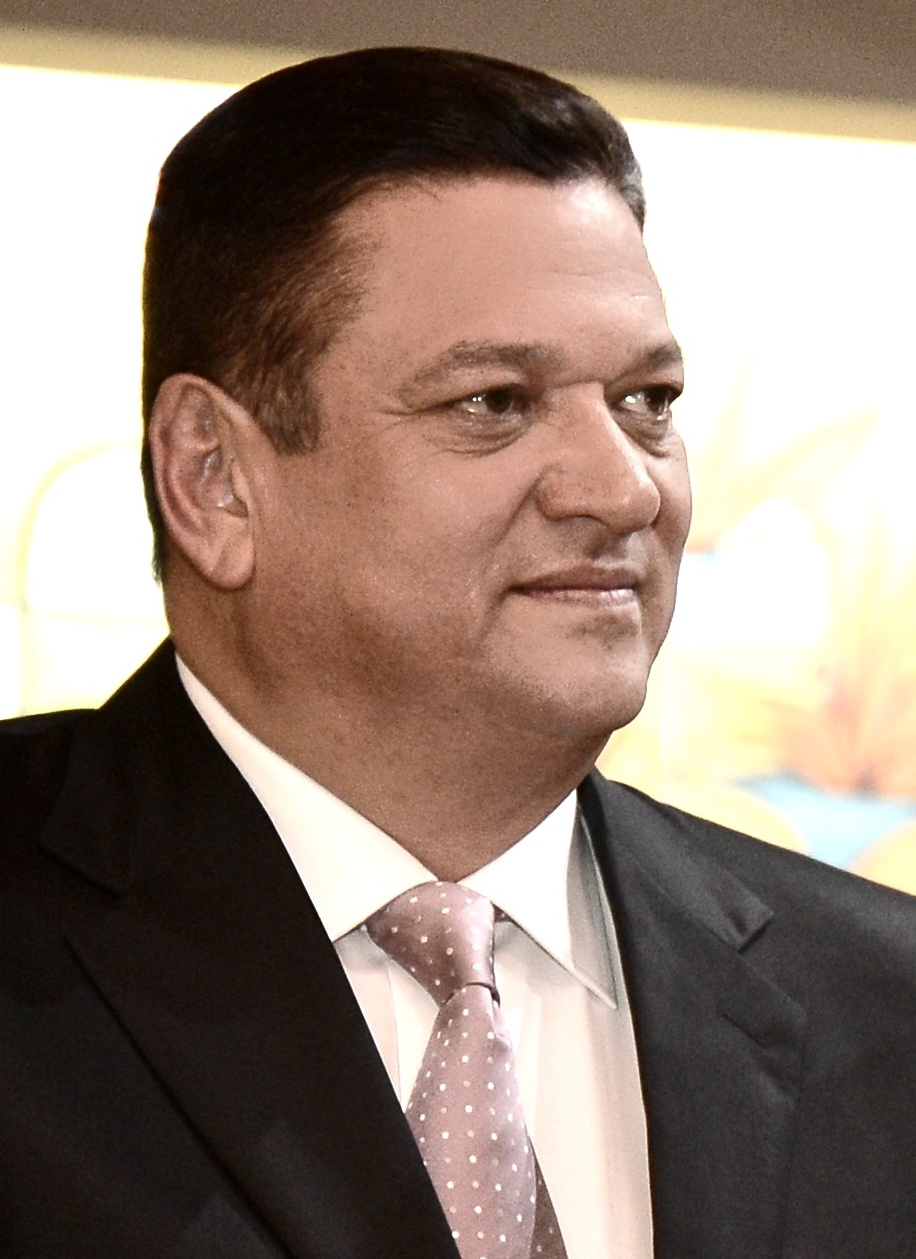

Mayor of San José
- In office 1 May 2016 – 1 May 2024
- Preceded by: Sandra García Pérez
- Succeeded by: Diego Miranda Méndez
- In office 1 May 1998 – 23 June 2013
- Preceded by: Office established (Note: Himself as Municipal executive)
- Succeeded by: Sandra García Pérez

Personal details
- Born: 29 April 1957 (age 69) Palmares, Costa Rica
- Party: National Liberation Party
- Spouse: Sandra León
- Education: University of Costa Rica

Johnny Francisco Araya Monge (born 29 April 1957) is a Costa Rican politician. He was the mayor of the country's capital San José from 1998 to 2013 and again from 2016 to 2024. He was also the co-president of the United Cities and Local Governments (UCLG) from 2010 to 2013. He is a member of the National Liberation Party (PLN) and was a presidential candidate in the 2014 election.

== Early life ==
Johnny Araya was born in 1957. He is the nephew of Luis Alberto Monge, who was President of Costa Rica from 1982 to 1986. Araya graduated from the University of Costa Rica's Faculty of Agronomy in 1980.

== Career ==
Araya worked as an agronomic engineer for many years. Elected councilor of the City of San José for the first time in 1982, he participated in the Harvard Institute for International Development's one-month program for mayors of Latin America and the Caribbean in 1992.

=== Mayor and international organizations official ===
He was mayor of the city between 1998 and 2001 and since 2003. He is also holding several other political posts: he is Member of the National Assembly, the National Policy Board, the San José Provincial Assembly and the San José Canton Assembly.

He was: Vice-president of the Union of Ibero-American Capital Cities (UCCI), representing the region of Central America, Mexico and the Caribbean from 1996 to 2000 and from 2004 to 2006; President-delegate and member of the Bureau of the World Federation of United Cities (FMCU); Vice-president of the executive committee of the UCCI from 2004 to 2006; Co-president of the UCCI from 2006 to 2008 and again vice-president from 2010 to 2012.

Inside the UCLG, Johnny Araya was a member of the executive committee of its Latin American regional section, the Latin American Federation of Cities, Municipalities and Associations of Local Governments (FLACMA) from 2004 to 2006; member of the World Council of UCLG from 2004 to 2007; FLACMA Co-president from 2006 to 2012; and finally UCLG Co-president for the 2010–2013 term.

=== Presidential candidacy ===
On 31 January 2013, the PLN nominated him as its presidential candidate to succeed his incumbent party colleague, President Laura Chinchilla, constitutionally barred from re-election. Monge's vice-presidential running mate was the sociologist, Silvia Lara Povedano.

Favored to win, Araya's campaign staff "guaranteed a triumph in the first round", but Araya came in second place to Luis Guillermo Solís, who won 30.9% of the vote against Araya's 29.6%. Araya's support was limited to the rural provinces of Guanacaste, Puntarenas and Limón, where the PLN maintains a strong party support system.

On 6 March 2014 Araya announced that he would abandon his presidential campaign after polls showed him far behind Luis Guillermo Solís.

== MECO Travel Incident ==
Five days after being chosen as the PLN presidential candidate, Araya flew in a private jet owned by MECO Construction, a firm that was awarded contracts worth US65 million by the former presidential administrations of Laura Chinchilla and Óscar Arias, both PLN members. Araya attended a FIFA World Cup qualifying match in Panama with his campaign manager and the CEO of MECO Construction, who had previously made donations to Chinchilla's campaign. After returning to Costa Rica, Araya denied traveling on a private jet or traveling with MECO Construction's CEO.

The owner of the jet, a private business owner, said that Araya had taken several trips on the jet previously. Such trips are in violation of Article 128 of the Supreme Electoral Tribunal of Costa Rica, which prohibits donations from private companies.

Araya was arrested as part of Operation Diamond on 15 November 2021 for alleged corruption.

== Notes ==
Political offices
Preceded by Omar Rojas Donato	Municipal Executive of San José; 1991–1998	Succeeded by Himself as Mayor
Preceded by Himself as Municipal Executive	Mayor of San José; 1998–2013	Succeeded by Sandra García Pérez
Preceded by Sandra García Pérez	Mayor of San José; 2016–present	Incumbent
Party political offices
Preceded by Laura Chinchilla	PLN nominee for President of Costa Rica; 2014	Succeeded by Antonio Álvarez Desanti
