= Santiago van der Putten =

Costa Rican footballer (born 2004)

Personal information
- Full name: Santiago Alberto van der Putten Campos
- Date of birth: 25 June 2004 (age 22)
- Place of birth: San Rafael District, Escazú, Costa Rica
- Height: 1.85 m (6 ft 1 in)
- Position: Central defender

Team information
- Current team: Alajuelense
- Number: 25

Youth career
- 2015–2020: Fútbol Consultants
- 2020: Saprissa
- 2020–2022: Alajuelense

Senior career*
Years	Team	Apps	(Gls)
2022–	Alajuelense	38	(3)
2022–2023	→ Betis Deportivo (loan)	1	(0)

International career^{‡}
2019	Costa Rica U15	1	(0)
2022	Costa Rica U19	4	(0)
2022	Costa Rica U20	5	(0)
2023	Costa Rica U23	4	(0)
2025–	Costa Rica	3	(0)
- * Club domestic league appearances and goals as of 28 May 2025 ‡ National team caps and goals as of 29 June 2025

Santiago Alberto van der Putten Campos (born 25 June 2005) is a Costa Rican footballer who plays as a central defender for Alajuelense and the Costa Rica national team.

== Early life ==
Van der Putten was born in the San Rafael District of Escazú to a Dutch father and Costa Rican mother.

== Club career ==
=== Early career ===
Van der Putten began his career with second division side Fútbol Consultants Edson Soto at the age of eleven. After realising it would give him a better chance of becoming a professional footballer, he moved to Liga FPD side Saprissa in early 2020. Due to the COVID-19 pandemic in Costa Rica, Van der Putten saw his career path accelerated, as the club could not afford to make new transfers, and he was promoted to the first team at the age of sixteen.

His agent also represented Honduran footballer Alberth Elis, who had signed for Boavista in September 2020, and Van der Putten was given the opportunity to trial with the Portuguese club. After several weeks with the under-19 squad, he returned to Costa Rica without a contract being offered.

=== Alajuelense ===
He and his family had always been fans of Saprissa, and when fellow top-flight side Alajuelense approached him to join, he initially declined in favour of remaining with the San José-based club. However, after his return from Portugal, he decided that it would be best for his career and development if he joined Alajuelense, despite the protests of his mother. He made his professional debut in the Liga FPD on 16 May 2022, starting in a 2–0 loss to Santos de Guápiles.

==== Loan to Real Betis ====
On 19 August 2022, it was announced that Van der Putten would join Spanish side Real Betis on loan, being assigned to the youth and reserve teams alongside compatriot Ricardo Peña. He featured for Betis in the Copa de Campeones youth competition, scoring in a 3–1 loss to Real Madrid in the 2023 final. In May 2023, it was reported that Real Betis were looking to extend Van der Putten's loan for another season.

== International career ==
Van der Putten is eligible to represent both Costa Rica and the Netherlands at international level, and holds a Dutch passport. He has represented Costa Rica from under-15 to under-23 level, and captained the under-17 team.

== Career statistics ==
=== Club ===
As of 28 May 2025.

Appearances and goals by club, season and competition
Club	Season	League			Cup		Continental		Other		Total	
Club	Season	Division	Apps	Goals	Apps	Goals	Apps	Goals	Apps	Goals	Apps	Goals
Alajuelense	2021–22	Liga FPD	1	0	0	0	0	0	0	0	1	0
Alajuelense	2022–23	Liga FPD	0	0	0	0	0	0	0	0	0	0
Alajuelense	2024–25	Liga FPD	37	3	2	0	6 (Note: Two appearances in CONCACAF Champions Cup, four appearances and one goal in Central American Cup)	1	0	0	45	4
Alajuelense	Total		38	3	2	0	6	1	0	0	46	4
Betis Deportivo (loan)	2022–23	Segunda Federación	1	0	0	0	–		0	0	1	0
Career total			39	3	2	0	6	1	0	0	47	4

=== International ===
As of match played 29 June 2025

Appearances and goals by national team and year
National team	Year	Apps	Goals
Costa Rica	2025	3	0
Total		3	0
