= National Route 39 (Costa Rica) =

National Primary Route around San José, Costa Rica

National Primary Route 39
- Ruta nacional primaria 39
- Second Republic Drive; Paseo de la Segunda República; Loop Road; Carretera de Circunvalación
- Dotted line depicts north arc under construction and since completed, as of 2025.

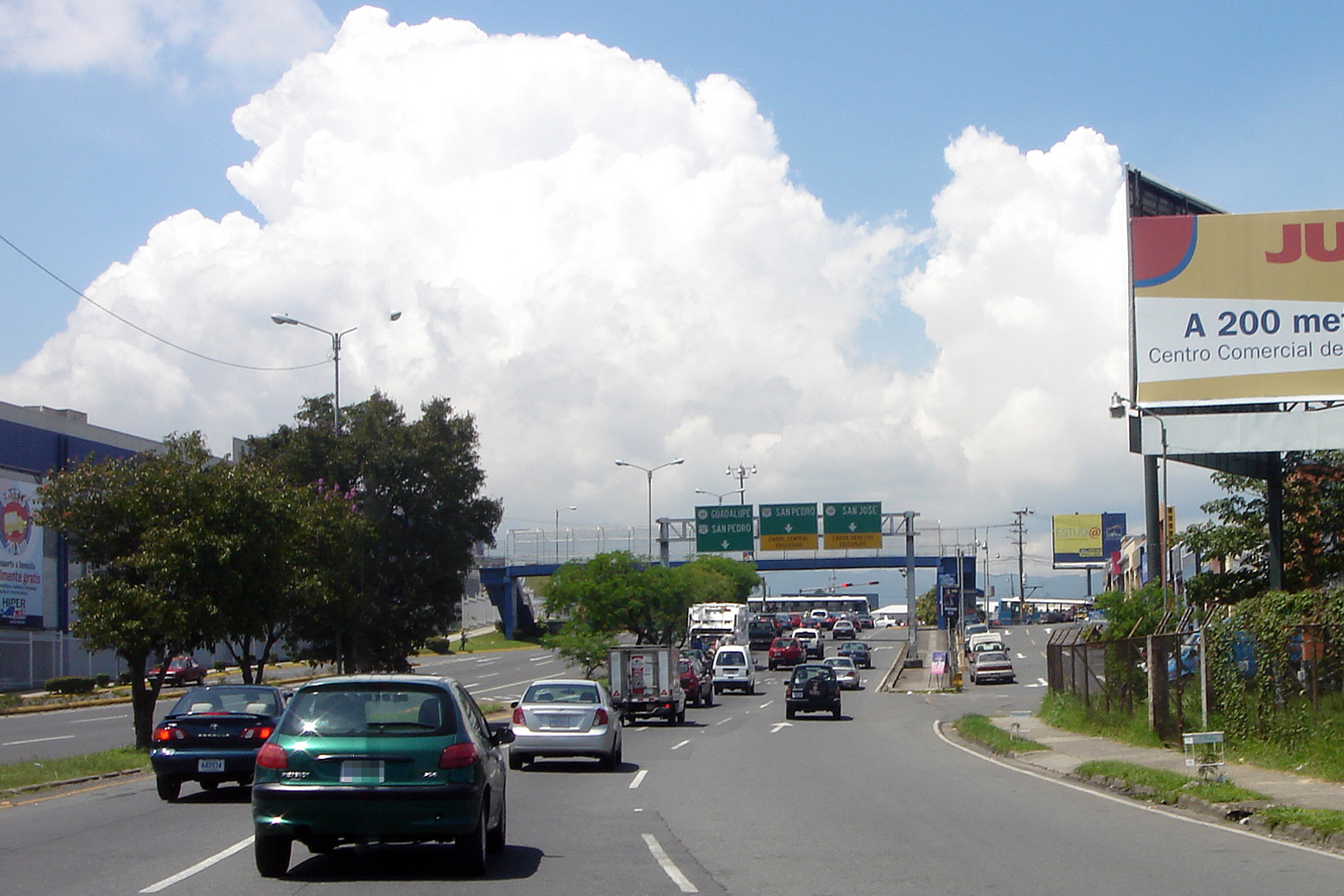

Route information
- Maintained by Ministry of Public Works and Transport
- Length: 14.910 km (9.265 mi)
- Existed: 1979–present
- History: Opened in 1979; Completed in 2024

Major junctions
- Loop around San José
- Route 1 Route 2 Route 27; Route 32

Location
- Country: Costa Rica
- Provinces: San José

Highway system
- National Road Network of Costa Rica
| ← Route 36 | → Route 1 |

National Primary Route 39, or just Route 39 (Spanish: Ruta Nacional Primaria 39, or Ruta 39) is a National Road Route of Costa Rica, located in the San José province. Its official name is Paseo de la Segunda República (Second Republic Drive), is also known as Carretera de Circunvalación (Loop Road), and is a ring road encircling the central districts of San José canton, the capital of the country.

== Description ==
It is one of the main roads of the capital San José, its purpose is to avoid the congestion of the inner districts. Currently, it starts in Uruca, in Avenida 39, which then takes south and to the east, finishing in the Goicoechea junction to Route 108 and Route 100. It is designed as dual two-lane road.

In San José province the route covers San José canton (Zapote, San Francisco de Dos Ríos, Uruca, Mata Redonda, Pavas, Hatillo, and San Sebastián districts), Goicoechea canton (Guadalupe and Calle Blancos districts), Montes de Oca canton (San Pedro and Mercedes districts).

Initially, eight roundabouts were constructed, some of which have been modified to include elevated highways, or demolished and turned into a semaphore regulated junction.

=== Route and access ===
Starting in Uruca, the road goes through Pavas and allows the access to places like Pavas, Mata Redonda and Escazú. There are junctions with Route 1 and Route 27.

Then Hatillo district, Alajuelita canton, San Sebastián are covered by the south section of the road, with access possible to Paso Ancho and Desamparados.

The east section covers Zapote, San Pedro and Goicoechea, which allow access to Catedral district, San Francisco de Dos Ríos, Curridabat canton, Sabanilla, Guadalupe, Calle Blancos, and Moravia. Access to the Route 2 is possible on this east section.

The north arc section allows access to Route 32, while there is also a pending design and construction of a link to Heredia through Santo Domingo.

== History ==
In the latter half of the 1950s, the Housing and Urbanism National Institute (INVU), together with the Ministry of Public Works and Transport (MOPT), proposed the construction of the ring road. It was designated as a public interest project. Twenty years later the project was stalled, and a foreign United States agency suggested to expand the ring to outer districts, away from the city center of San José and its central districts of Carmen, Merced, Hospital, Catedral, Zapote and Mata Redonda.

Construction started in 1979.

=== Roundabouts upgrades ===
Several of the ground level roundabouts that were originally part of this road, have been reconstructed, giving priority to the vehicular flow of the Route 39.

- Rancho Guanacaste Roundabout: Route 39 goes above in an elevated highway, while there is a roundabout in the ground level.
- San Sebastián Roundabout: Route 39 goes below an elevated roundabout composed of two elevated roads.
- Paso Ancho Roundabout: Route 39 goes below an elevated roundabout composed of two elevated roads.
- Y Griega Roundabout: Route 39 goes through an elevated highway, with a lower level roundabout for the junction between Routes 209, 211 and 39.
- Fuente de la Hispanidad Roundabout: At the junction between Route 2 in San Pedro, an elevated highway was constructed for Route 39, the lower level is a roundabout.
- Social Guarantees Roundabout: At the junction between Route 215 in Zapote and Route 39, this roundabout includes a two-lane in each direction lower level highway for Route 39. Construction by the MECO group started on 14 January 2019, and it was inaugurated on 30 March 2020, in a remote and virtual ceremony due to the COVID-19 pandemic.

As of 2020 the following work is planned for the remaining roundabouts, it was designed as a single construction work by the United Nations Office for Project Services, which supervises the project:

- Guadalupe Semaphore Junction: It allows the interchange of traffic between Route 39 (north-south) and Route 218 (east-west), while it was originally a roundabout, it was demolished and a semaphore regulated crossing was built in its place, and then will be converted again to a roundabout in the ground level, and a 790 metres (0.49 mi) tunnel on the lower level for Route 39. Construction works by the Consorcio Puentes y Calzadas group from Spain, at a cost of US$19.5 million, started on 1 February 2020, by removing the semaphores and building a temporary roundabout with Jersey barriers. In April 2020 it was announced that a third top level at a cost of US$8 million will be included in the works, as it was determined since 2014 that traffic growth by 2020 will require such structure. Nonetheless, due to being unable to find the extra financing, the Costa Rican government was unable to modify the original design for the new Guadalupe underpass, due to be completed by April 2021.
- National Flag Roundabout: At the junction between Route 202 in San Pedro and Route 39, this roundabout will include a lower level highway for Route 39. Nearby, at the entrance of the law school of University of Costa Rica, a two-level junction will be constructed to further improve the flow of Route 39. Construction began in December 2020, expected to be completed by April 2022.

=== North arc ===
As of 2019, the ring road was incomplete, missing the 4.1-kilometer north arc between Uruca and Calle Blancos. In the first half of the 2000 decade, the MOPT expropriated some of the required residential areas, but no evictions were executed, later in 2019 a couple of industrial plots were expropriated.

The works are financed by the Central American Bank for Economic Integration and the concession was awarded to private contractor Hernán Solís–La Estrella.

The construction project on the north section was split on five "functional unit" working sections, and construction started on September 11, 2017:

- Functional Unit I: Starts on the west segment of the ring road, in Uruca. An expropriation process for an industrial area delayed the start of this section until September 2019. A new three-level interchange will be constructed, with a lower level for transit over Route 108, a second level roundabout, and top level for transit of Route 39, works on the interchange started on March 10, 2020, with a projected finish date after fourteen months, around May 2021.
- Functional Unit II: Will connect the León XIII and Colima sections, it is functionally finished as of September 2019. A road connecting Heredia is planned for another project, and the exit is already constructed.
- Functional Unit III: Will go from Colima to Route 32. A shanty town was cleared up for this section. A school was also demolished and relocated. It will span the longest elevated highway in the country of approximately two kilometres.
- Functional Unit IV: Will from the intersection with Route 32 to Calle Blancos, includes the first three-level interchange in the country, which spans a lower level for Route 32, a roundabout in the second level, and the ring road on the top level.
- Functional Unit V: Starts on the east segment of the ring road, in Calle Blancos, this section will be delayed until the expropriation process for more than four hundred residential plots is finished. Designs are also under way.

The north arc of the road opened in 2024.

=== Hatillo tunnels ===
In December 2018 and February 2019 was announced that the three semaphore-regulated junctions in the Hatillo district would be upgraded to tunnels for the transversal roads to improve the route flow of Route 39 which would be over the tunnels, these works are projected to be finished in 2020. These works together with the upgrade of the Guadalupe semaphore junction, and the Montes de Oca train crossing removal, would render the ring road free of any stops.

=== Train crossing in Montes de Oca ===
The train crossing in Montes de Oca canton, currently at ground level in Route 39, will be removed. Designs are in the planning stage
