= National Route 100 (Costa Rica) =

National Road Route in Costa Rica

National Secondary Route 100
- Ruta nacional secundaria 100

Route information
- Maintained by Ministry of Public Works and Transport
- Length: 3.135 km (1.948 mi)

Major junctions
- West end: Route 108
- East end: Route 109

Location
- Country: Costa Rica
- Provinces: San José

Highway system
- National Road Network of Costa Rica
← Route 257	→ Route 101

National Secondary Route 100, or just Route 100 (Spanish: Ruta Nacional Secundaria 100, or Ruta 100) is a National Road Route of Costa Rica, located in the San José province.

== Description ==
In San José province the route covers San José canton (Uruca district), Goicoechea canton (Calle Blancos district), Tibás canton (Cinco Esquinas district).
