= Mata Redonda =

District in San José canton, San José province, Costa Rica

- District
- Interactive map of Mata Redonda
- Mata Redonda district location in Costa Rica
- Coordinates: 9.935246°N 84.1105741°W
- Country: Costa Rica
- Province: San José
- Canton: San José

Area
  - Total: 3.69 km^{2} (1.42 sq mi)
- Elevation: 1,125 m (3,691 ft)

Population (2011)
  - Total: 8,313
  - Density: 2,250/km^{2} (5,830/sq mi)
- Time zone: UTC−06:00
- Postal code: 10108

Mata Redonda is a district of the San José canton, in the San José province of Costa Rica.

== Geography ==
Mata Redonda has an area of 3.69 km^{2} and an elevation of 1125 metres.

It borders with two San José cantons, Escazú and Alajuelita, and with Pavas, Uruca, Merced, Hospital and Hatillo as well.

== Locations ==
Mata Redonda district includes the "barrios" (or neighbourhoods) of Americas, Anonos, Balcón Verde, Calle Morenos, El Rey, Holanda, La Salle, Loma Linda, Niza, Nunciatura, Rancho Luna, Roma, Urbanización Paseo Colón, and Sabana.

== Demographics ==
Historical population
Census	Pop.	±% p.a.
1883	635	—
1892	942	+4.48%
1927	927	−0.05%
1950	1,848	+3.05%
1963	3,373	+4.74%
1973	7,666	+8.56%
1984	9,486	+1.96%
2000	9,321	−0.11%
2011	8,313	−1.04%
2022	11,491	+2.99%
Source: Instituto Nacional de Estadística y Censos; Centro Centroamericano de Población

For the 2011 census, Mata Redonda had a population of 8313 inhabitants.

Besides the case of Carmen, afflicted by a strong population decline, Mata Redonda district possess the lowest rate of population density in San José downtown, because within its confines lies the biggest urban park in the city, La Sabana Metropolitan Park.

== Transportation ==
=== Road transportation ===
The district is covered by the following road routes:

- National Route 1
- National Route 27
- National Route 39
- National Route 104
- National Route 167
- National Route 176
- National Route 177

=== Rail transportation ===
The Interurbano Line operated by Incofer goes through this district.
