= Escazú (district) =

District in Escazú canton, San José province, Costa Rica

- District
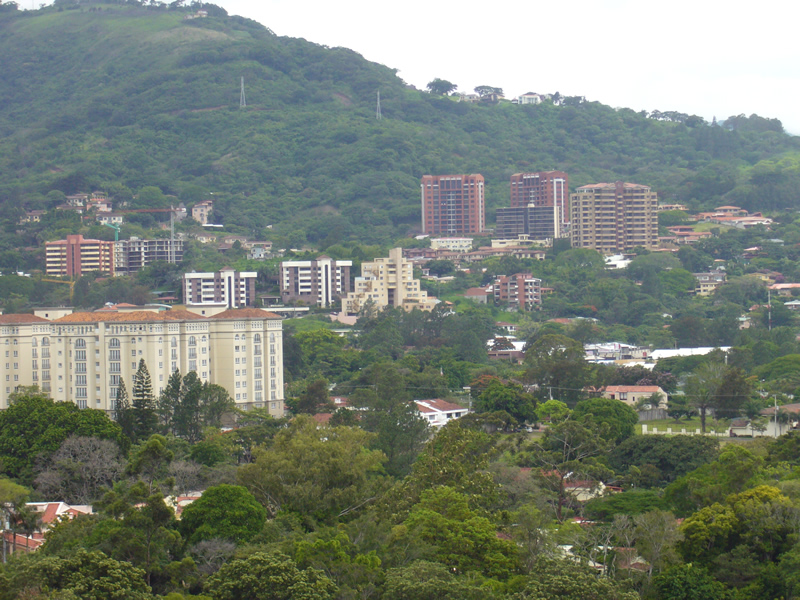
- Skyline of Escazu City
- Interactive map of Escazú
- Escazú district location in Costa Rica
- Coordinates: 9.9159843°N 84.1458602°W
- Country: Costa Rica
- Province: San José
- Canton: Escazú

Area
  - Total: 4.56 km^{2} (1.76 sq mi)
- Elevation: 1,101 m (3,612 ft)

Population (2011)
  - Total: 11,984
  - Density: 2,630/km^{2} (6,810/sq mi)
- Time zone: UTC−06:00
- Postal code: 10201

Escazú is a district of the Escazú canton, in the San José province of Costa Rica.

== Geography ==
Escazú has an area of 4.56 km^{2} and an elevation of 1,101 metres.

It is located on the northeast slopes of the Cerros de Escazú, 9 kilometers west of the national capital city of San José, and lies in the center of the canton, limiting west to Santa Ana Canton, north to San Rafael district and south to San Antonio district.

== Demographics ==
Historical population
Census	Pop.	±% p.a.
1864	2,533	—
1883	170	−13.25%
1892	961	+21.22%
1927	2,143	+2.32%
1950	3,031	+1.52%
1963	6,182	+5.64%
1973	9,858	+4.78%
1984	10,505	+0.58%
2000	12,379	+1.03%
2011	11,984	−0.29%
2022	12,590	+0.45%
Source: Instituto Nacional de Estadística y Censos; Centro Centroamericano de Población

For the 2011 census, Escazú had a population of 11,984 inhabitants.

The area is inhabited primarily by upper-mid to high income families, and known in the Costa Rican collective consciousness as home to the country's economic elite. Escazu is the wealthiest and most prominent city in the country catering to wealthy Americans and Europeans as well as wealthy locals.

Escazú has a relatively large Jewish population, and several synagogues.

== Climate ==
The climate is mostly tropical: it is not unknown for Escazú to experience rainfall on a day in which San José is dry and sunny. November and December frequently bring high winds.

== Economy ==
Escazú is one of the most affluent places in Costa Rica, with many expensive restaurants and shops. It has commercial developments, like Avenida Escazú, which holds the country's first IMAX theater. Avenida Escazú is a modern outdoor mall/center. This mall has many international brands and a campus of Texas Tech University. Another unique feature of Escazu is that it is home to stores from large international brand names.

== Locations ==
Many locations in the city are prized for their scenic outlooks. This zone is one of the most developed parts in the metropolitan area, populated by families with high incomes. Escazú contains many apartment blocks and residential areas.

Over the past couple of decades, Escazú has become an expatriate enclave: several embassies have their residences located here, including the residence of the US Ambassador, Dutch, British, German, Canadian, and South Korean Ambassadors. The past few years have seen a significant influx of newly arrived foreigners from North America, South America and Europe. It is home to many bars and restaurants, especially those of the more chic (and expensive) variety. Rents and prices reflect this and Escazú is one of the most well-known upscale locations in Costa Rica. The city offers many venues that are English speaking oriented like movie theaters, health clinics, business centers and a luxury country club.

== Transportation ==
=== Road transportation ===
The district is covered by the following road routes:

- National Route 105
- National Route 177

== Sports ==
The football soccer club Brujas F.C. was born here. The name of the team "Brujas" is a reference to the nickname of the city "La ciudad de las brujas" (The City of the Witches). However, the team moved in 2009 to Desamparados.
