= Uruca =

District in San José canton, San José province, Costa Rica

- District
- Uruca district
- Uruca district location in Costa Rica
- Coordinates: 9.9575393°N 84.1326701°W
- Country: Costa Rica
- Province: San José
- Canton: San José

Area
  - Total: 8.44 km^{2} (3.26 sq mi)
- Elevation: 1,112 m (3,648 ft)

Population (2011)
  - Total: 31,728
  - Density: 3,760/km^{2} (9,740/sq mi)
- Time zone: UTC−06:00
- Postal code: 10107

Uruca is the seventh district of the San José canton, in the San José province of Costa Rica. It is an important industrial and commercial area of San José. Commonly known as La Uruca, it's the second biggest district by area (after Pavas), and recognized as a heavily congested transportation hub.

== Geography ==
Uruca has an area of 8.44 km^{2} and an elevation of 1,112 metres.

It is the capital's western entrance. The canton's whole boundary with Heredia Province is confined in this district: Belén, Heredia and Santo Domingo cantons limit with La Uruca on its northern side, as well as San José's Escazú and Tibás. Merced, Mata Redonda and Pavas also border the district.

== Locations ==
Uruca district includes the "barrios" (or neighbourhoods) of Alborada, Bajos de Torres, Carpio, Carranza, Corazón de Jesús, Cristal, Finca de la Caja, Florentino Castro, Jardines de Autopi, Las Animas, Magnolias, Marimil, Monserrat, Peregrina, Robledal, Rositer Carballo, Santander, Saturno, Uruca Centro, Vuelta del Virilla and Zona Industrial.

== Demographics ==
Historical population
| Census | Pop. | ±% p.a. |
|---|---|---|
| 1883 | 1,172 | — |
| 1892 | 1,412 | +2.09% |
| 1927 | 2,004 | +1.01% |
| 1950 | 2,811 | +1.48% |
| 1963 | 3,766 | +2.28% |
| 1973 | 7,441 | +7.05% |
| 1984 | 8,932 | +1.67% |
| 2000 | 27,110 | +7.19% |
| 2011 | 31,728 | +1.44% |
| 2022 | 46,829 | +3.60% |
Source: Instituto Nacional de Estadística y Censos; Centro Centroamericano de Población

For the 2011 census, Uruca had a population of 31,728 inhabitants.

== Transportation ==
=== Road transportation ===
The district is covered by the following road routes:

- National Route 1
- National Route 3
- National Route 39
- National Route 100
- National Route 101
- National Route 108

=== Rail transportation ===
The Interurbano Line operated by Incofer goes through this district.
