= Calle Blancos =

District in San José province, Costa Rica

- District
- Interactive map of Calle Blancos
- Calle Blancos district location in Costa Rica
- Coordinates: 9.9489647°N 84.0669214°W
- Country: Costa Rica
- Province: San José
- Canton: Goicoechea

Area
  - Total: 2.36 km^{2} (0.91 sq mi)
- Elevation: 1,185 m (3,888 ft)

Population (2011)
  - Total: 18,984
  - Density: 8,040/km^{2} (20,800/sq mi)
- Time zone: UTC−06:00
- Postal code: 10803

Calle Blancos is a district of the Goicoechea canton, in the San José province of Costa Rica.

== Geography ==
Calle Blancos has an area of 2.36 km^{2} and an elevation of 1,185 metres.

== Demographics ==
Historical population
Census	Pop.	±% p.a.
1892	580	—
1927	1,402	+2.55%
1950	5,800	+6.37%
1963	10,836	+4.93%
1973	12,408	+1.36%
1984	16,155	+2.43%
2000	19,411	+1.15%
2011	18,984	−0.20%
2022	16,894	−1.05%
Source: Instituto Nacional de Estadística y Censos; Centro Centroamericano de Población

For the 2011 census, Calle Blancos had a population of 18,984 inhabitants.

== Transportation ==
=== Road transportation ===
The district is covered by the following road routes:

- National Route 32
- National Route 39
- National Route 100
- National Route 109
- National Route 201
