= National Route 104 (Costa Rica) =

National Road Route in Costa Rica

National Secondary Route 104
- Ruta nacional secundaria 104

Route information
- Maintained by Ministry of Public Works and Transport
- Length: 8.395 km (5.216 mi)

Location
- Country: Costa Rica
- Provinces: San José

Highway system
- National Road Network of Costa Rica
← Route 103	→ Route 105

National Secondary Route 104, or just Route 104 (Spanish: Ruta Nacional Secundaria 104, or Ruta 104) is a National Road Route of Costa Rica, located in the San José province.

== Description ==
It is the main road between the Mata Redonda district of San José canton, and Pavas canton. This road starts in the junction with Route 1 at the northeast corner of La Sabana Metropolitan Park, it is the north border road of the park.

In San José province the route covers San José canton (Mata Redonda, Pavas districts).

== History ==
In 2019 there were works to widen the road from two to four lanes, two in each direction.
