= Purral =

District in Goicoechea canton, San José province, Costa Rica

- District
- Purral district
- Purral district location in Costa Rica
- Coordinates: 9.9594423°N 84.0164941°W
- Country: Costa Rica
- Province: San José
- Canton: Goicoechea
- Creation: 23 July 1991

Area
  - Total: 3.11 km^{2} (1.20 sq mi)
- Elevation: 1,242 m (4,075 ft)

Population (2011)
  - Total: 27,464
  - Density: 8,830/km^{2} (22,900/sq mi)
- Time zone: UTC−06:00
- Postal code: 10807

Purral is a district of the Goicoechea canton, in the San José province of Costa Rica.

== History ==
Purral was created on 23 July 1991 by Decreto Ejecutivo 20587-G. Segregated from Ipís.

== Geography ==
Purral has an area of 3.11 km^{2} and an elevation of 1,242 metres.

== Demographics ==
Historical population
Census	Pop.	±% p.a.
2000	26,767	—
2011	27,464	+0.23%
2022	34,370	+2.06%
Source: Instituto Nacional de Estadística y Censos; Centro Centroamericano de Población

For the 2011 census, Purral had a population of 27,464 inhabitants.

== Transportation ==
=== Road transportation ===
The district is covered by the following road routes:

- National Route 218
