= Costa Rica national under-20 football team =

Football team

Costa Rica under-20
- Nickname(s): Ticos, La Tricolor, La Sele (Selección)
- Association: Federación Costarricense de Fútbol
- Confederation: CONCACAF
- Head coach: (Costa Rica) Vladimir Quesada
- FIFA code: CRC
First colours	Second colours

First international
- Costa Rica 5–1 Nicaragua (Panama City, Panama; March 5, 1962)

Biggest win
- Costa Rica 8–0 Puerto Rico (Port of Spain, Trinidad and Tobago; August 22, 1984); Belize 0–8 Costa Rica (Belmopan, Belize; unknown date 1990)

Biggest defeat
- Costa Rica 2–6 Japan (Kuantan, Malaysia; June 20, 1997); Spain 4–0 Costa Rica (Kuantan, Malaysia; June 23, 1997) Records for competitive matches only.

FIFA U-20 World Cup
- Appearances: 9 (first in 1989)
- Best result: Fourth Place (2009)

CONCACAF Under-20 Championship
- Appearances: 19 (first in 1962)
- Best result: Winner (1988, 2009)

The Costa Rica national under-20 football team represents Costa Rica in international football at this age level and is controlled by the Costa Rican Football Federation.

== Competitive record ==
=== FIFA U-20 World Cup ===
Year	Round	Position	Pld	W	D	L	GF	GA
(Tunisia) 1977	Did Not enter							
(Japan) 1979	Did Not enter							
(Australia) 1981	Did not qualify							
(Mexico) 1983	Did not qualify							
(Soviet Union) 1985	Did not qualify							
(Chile) 1987	Did not qualify							
(Saudi Arabia) 1989	Group stage	14th	3	1	0	2	2	4
(Portugal) 1991	Did not qualify							
(Australia) 1993	Did not qualify							
(Qatar) 1995	Group stage	10th	3	1	0	2	3	6
(Malaysia) 1997	Group stage	21st	3	0	1	2	3	11
(Nigeria) 1999	Round of 16	15th	4	1	1	2	4	7
(Argentina) 2001	Round of 16	9th	4	3	0	1	8	4
(United Arab Emirates) 2003	Did not qualify							
(Netherlands) 2005	Did not qualify							
(Canada) 2007	Group stage	17th	3	1	0	2	2	3
(Egypt) 2009	Fourth place	4th	7	3	1	3	10	11
(Colombia) 2011	Round of 16	15th	4	1	0	3	6	12
(Turkey) 2013	Did not qualify							
(New Zealand) 2015	Did not qualify							
(South Korea) 2017	Round of 16	12th	4	1	1	2	3	4
(Poland) 2019	Did not qualify							
(Indonesia) 2021	Cancelled							
(Argentina) 2023	Did not qualify							
(Chile) 2025	Did not qualify							
(Azerbaijan) (Uzbekistan) 2027	Qualified - Tournament Results TBD							
(Armenia) (Georgia (country)) 2029	TBD							
Total	Fourth place	9/26	35	12	4	19	41	62

== Fixtures and recent results ==
The following is a list of match results from the previous 12 months, as well as any future matches that have been scheduled.

Win Draw Loss

== Current squad ==
- The following players were called up for the 2022 CONCACAF U-20 Championship.
- Match dates: 18 June – 3 July 2022
- Caps and goals correct as of: 19 June 2022, after the match against Jamaica
- Names in italics denote players who have been capped for the senior team.

No.	Pos.	Player	Date of birth (age)	Caps	Goals	Club
1	GK	Abraham Madriz	2 April 2004 (age 22)	0	0	(Costa Rican Football Federation) Saprissa
18	GK	Bayron Mora	5 May 2003 (age 23)	1	0	(Costa Rican Football Federation) Alajuelense
2	DF	Julián González	27 January 2005 (age 21)	1	0	(Costa Rican Football Federation) Saprissa
3	DF	Douglas Sequeira	16 September 2003 (age 23)	1	0	(Costa Rican Football Federation) Uruguay
4	DF	Brandon Calderón	21 July 2004 (age 22)	1	0	(United States Soccer Federation) UCF Knights
5	DF	Santiago van der Putten	25 June 2004 (age 22)	1	0	(Costa Rican Football Federation) Alajuelense
12	DF	Shawn Johnson	28 February 2003 (age 23)	1	0	(Costa Rican Football Federation) Guanacasteca
13	DF	Keral Ríos	5 March 2003 (age 23)	0	0	(Costa Rican Football Federation) Pérez Zeledón
6	MF	Ricardo Peña	15 July 2004 (age 22)	1	0	(Costa Rican Football Federation) Futbol Consultants
7	MF	Andrey Soto	8 April 2003 (age 23)	1	0	(Costa Rican Football Federation) San Carlos
8	MF	Creichel Pérez	11 November 2004 (age 21)	0	0	(Costa Rican Football Federation) Guadalupe
10	MF	Brandon Aguilera	28 June 2003 (age 23)	1	0	(Costa Rican Football Federation) Guanacasteca
14	MF	Timothy Arias	30 September 2004 (age 22)	1	0	(United States Soccer Federation) UCF Knights
16	MF	Andrey Salmerón	22 March 2004 (age 22)	1	0	(Costa Rican Football Federation) Futbol Consultants
9	FW	Doryan Rodríguez	18 January 2003 (age 23)	1	0	(Costa Rican Football Federation) Alajuelense
11	FW	Josimar Alcócer	17 July 2004 (age 22)	1	0	(Costa Rican Football Federation) Alajuelense
15	FW	Jostin Tellería	10 April 2003 (age 23)	1	0	(Royal Spanish Football Federation) Intercity
17	FW	Jewison Bennette	15 June 2004 (age 22)	1	0	(Costa Rican Football Federation) Herediano
19	FW	Fabricio Alemán	26 July 2003 (age 23)	1	0	(Royal Spanish Football Federation) Intercity
20	FW	Enyel Escoe	8 May 2003 (age 23)	0	0	(Costa Rican Football Federation) Grecia

== Honours ==
Major competitions

- CONCACAF Under-20 Championship
  - Winners (2): 1988, 2009
  - Runners-up (2): 1994, 2011

== Individual awards ==
In addition to team victories, Costa Rican players have won individual awards at FIFA World Youth Cups.

Year	Golden Glove
(Egypt) 2009	Esteban Alvarado

== Results ==
CONCACAF Under-20 Championship
Year	P	W	T	L	F	A	D	Pts	Finish
(Panama) 1962	7	3	1	3	19	10	+9	7	Fourth Place
(Guatemala) 1964	Did not qualify								
(Cuba) 1970	Did not qualify								
(Mexico) 1973	Did not qualify								
(Canada) 1974	3	1	1	1	7	2	+5	3	Group Phase
(Puerto Rico) 1976	Did not qualify								
(Honduras) 1978	7	4	1	2	13	10	+3	9	Semifinalist
(United States) 1980	3	1	0	2	5	7	-2	2	Group Phase
(Guatemala) 1982	7	4	2	1	17	10	+7	10	Third place
(Trinidad and Tobago) 1984	6	2	2	2	13	7	+6	6	Second round
(Trinidad and Tobago) 1986	Did not qualify								
(Guatemala) 1988	9	8	1	0	24	6	+18	17	Champions
(Guatemala) 1990	4	3	0	1	11	3	+8	6	Group Phase
(Canada) 1992	3	1	1	1	4	2	+2	3	Group Phase
(Honduras) 1994	6	4	1	1	18	7	+11	13	Runners-up
(Mexico) 1996	5	4	0	1	12	4	+8	12	Fourth Place
(Guatemala) (Trinidad and Tobago) 1998	3	2	1	0	6	1	+5	7	2nd Group B
(Canada) (Trinidad and Tobago) 2001	3	2	1	0	12	2	+10	7	1st Group A
(Panama) (United States) 2003	Did not qualify								
(Honduras) (United States) 2005	3	1	1	1	4	4	0	4	Group Phase
(Panama) (Mexico) 2007	3	2	1	0	6	3	+3	7	2nd Group B
(Trinidad and Tobago) 2009	5	3	2	0	6	1	+5	11	Champions
(Guatemala) 2011	4	3	0	1	13	4	+9	9	Runners-up
(Mexico) 2013	3	1	0	2	2	3	–1	3	Quarterfinalist
(Jamaica) 2015	Did not qualify								
(Costa Rica) 2017	5	2	1	2	5	5	0	7	Fourth Place
(United States) 2018	6	4	1	1	15	5	+10	13	Fifth Place
Totals	89	51	17	21	197	91	+106	143	—

=== Record versus other nations at U-20 World Cup ===
Nation	Pld	W	D	L	GF	GA	GD	Pts
Australia	3	2	0	1	6	4	+2	6
Brazil	2	0	0	2	0	6	-6	0
Colombia	2	1	0	1	3	3	0	2
Cameroon	1	0	0	1	1	3	-2	0
Ecuador	2	1	0	1	1	3	-2	3
Egypt	1	1	0	0	2	0	+2	3
United Arab Emirates	1	1	0	0	2	1	+1	3
England	1	0	0	1	1	2	-1	0
Ethiopia	1	1	0	0	3	1	+2	3
Germany	2	2	0	0	4	2	+2	6
Ghana	1	0	0	1	0	2	-2	0
Hungary	1	0	1	0	1	1	0	1
Japan	2	0	0	2	2	7	-5	0
Iran	1	0	0	1	0	1	-1	0
Netherlands	1	1	0	0	3	1	+2	3
Nigeria	2	0	1	1	1	2	-1	1
Paraguay	2	0	1	1	2	4	-2	1
Portugal	1	0	1	0	1	1	0	1
Syria	1	0	0	1	1	3	-2	0
Scotland	1	1	0	0	1	0	+1	3
Spain	2	0	0	2	1	8	-7	0
Czech Republic	2	0	0	2	3	5	-2	0
Soviet Union	1	0	0	1	0	1	-1	0
Zambia	1	1	0	0	0	1	0	3
Totals	35	12	3	19	41	62	-21	39

== See also ==
- Costa Rica national football team
- Costa Rica national under-23 football team
- Costa Rica national under-17 football team
- Costa Rica at the FIFA World Cup

== Head-to-head record ==
The following table shows Costa Rica's head-to-head record in the FIFA U-20 World Cup.

Opponent	Pld	W	D	L	GF	GA	GD	Win %
Australia	3	2	0	1	6	4	+2	66.67
Brazil	2	0	0	2	0	6	−6	0.00
Cameroon	1	0	0	1	1	3	−2	0.00
Colombia	2	1	0	1	3	3	+0	50.00
Czech Republic	2	0	0	2	3	5	−2	0.00
Ecuador	2	1	0	1	1	3	−2	50.00
Egypt	1	1	0	0	2	0	+2	100.00
England	1	0	0	1	1	2	−1	0.00
Ethiopia	1	1	0	0	3	1	+2	100.00
Germany	2	2	0	0	4	2	+2	100.00
Ghana	1	0	0	1	0	2	−2	0.00
Hungary	1	0	1	0	1	1	+0	0.00
Iran	1	0	0	1	0	1	−1	0.00
Japan	2	0	0	2	2	7	−5	0.00
Netherlands	1	1	0	0	3	1	+2	100.00
Nigeria	2	0	1	1	1	2	−1	0.00
Paraguay	2	0	1	1	2	4	−2	0.00
Portugal	1	0	1	0	1	1	+0	0.00
Scotland	1	1	0	0	2	1	+1	100.00
Soviet Union	1	0	0	1	0	1	−1	0.00
Spain	2	0	0	2	1	8	−7	0.00
Syria	1	0	0	1	1	3	−2	0.00
United Arab Emirates	1	1	0	0	2	1	+1	100.00
Zambia	1	1	0	0	1	0	+1	100.00
Total	35	12	4	19	41	62	−21	34.29
