= Ricardo Peña (Costa Rican footballer) =

Costa Rican footballer (born 2004)

Personal information
- Full name: Ricardo Allen Peña Gutiérrez
- Date of birth: 15 July 2004 (age 22)
- Place of birth: Limón, Costa Rica
- Height: 1.85 m (6 ft 1 in)
- Position: Midfielder

Team information
- Current team: Municipal Liberia (on loan from Fútbol Consultants)
- Number: 6

Youth career
- Limón
- 2019–2020: Fútbol Consultants

Senior career*
Years	Team	Apps	(Gls)
2020–	Fútbol Consultants	0	(0)
2022–2023	→ Real Betis C (loan)	4	(1)
2023	→ Spartak Trnava (loan)	0	(0)
2023	→ Malženice (loan)	2	(0)
2024	→ Colorado Rapids 2 (loan)	0	(0)

International career^{‡}
2019	Costa Rica U15	1	(0)
- Costa Rica U17
2022–	Costa Rica U20	4	(0)
2023–	Costa Rica U23	4	(0)
2023–	Costa Rica	2	(0)
- * Club domestic league appearances and goals as of 17 December 2023 ‡ National team caps and goals as of 11 August 2023

Ricardo Allen Peña Gutiérrez (born 15 July 2004) is a Costa Rican footballer who currently plays as a midfielder for Fútbol Consultants and the Costa Rica national team.

== Club career ==
Born in Limón, Peña joined the academy of Segunda División de Costa Rica side Fútbol Consultants at the age of fifteen. Having made his debut at the age of sixteen, he trialled with German and Portuguese clubs Hannover 96 and Braga, respectively.

In August 2022, having trialled with them earlier in the year, Peña joined Spanish side Real Betis on a two-year loan, alongside fellow Costa Rican Santiago van der Putten. While van der Putten was immediately brought into the squad with no work permit issues due to his Dutch heritage, Peña had to wait to receive his visa.

Throughout his first season in Spain, Peña featured mostly for the club's third team, Real Betis C, who were playing amateur football in the Spanish ninth division. He featured once for the club's under-19 team, as they went on to win the national title.

The following year, he joined Slovak side Spartak Trnava, on a one-year loan deal with an option to buy. He made his debut for the club on 3 August 2023, coming on as a substitute for Lukáš Štetina in a UEFA Europa Conference League qualification match against Latvian side Auda. However, a mistake by Peña allowed Auda's South Sudanese forward Manyumow Achol to take the ball and go on to score, though it was ultimately only a consolation as Spartak Trnava went on to win 4–1.

== International career ==
Having represented Costa Rica at youth international level, Peña was called up to the senior squad for the first time in June 2023 for a friendly against Ecuador, following an injury to Youstin Salas. Having made his debut in the 3–1 loss to Ecuador, he was a surprise inclusion in the Costa Rican squad for the 2023 CONCACAF Gold Cup.

In June 2023, he took part in the Maurice Revello Tournament in France with Costa Rica.

== Career statistics ==
=== Club ===
As of 26 June 2023.

Appearances and goals by club, season and competition
Club	Season	League			Cup		Continental		Other		Total	
Club	Season	Division	Apps	Goals	Apps	Goals	Apps	Goals	Apps	Goals	Apps	Goals
Real Betis C (loan)	2022–23	Tercera Andaluza	4	1	–		–		0	0	4	1
Spartak Trnava (loan)	2023–24	1. liga	0	0	0	0	1 (Note: Appearances in UEFA Europa Conference League qualification)	0	0	0	1	0
Malženice (loan)	2023–24	2. liga	2	0	0	0	0	0	0	0	2	0
Career total			6	1	0	0	1	0	0	0	7	1

=== International ===
As of 11 August 2023

Appearances and goals by national team and year
National team	Year	Apps	Goals
Costa Rica	2023	2	0
Total		2	0
