= National Route 205 (Costa Rica) =

National Road Route in Costa Rica

National Secondary Route 205
- Ruta nacional secundaria 205

Route information
- Maintained by Ministry of Public Works and Transport
- Length: 6.725 km (4.179 mi)

Major junctions
- From: Route 218
- East end: Route 218

Location
- Country: Costa Rica
- Provinces: San José

Highway system
- National Road Network of Costa Rica
← Route 204	→ Route 206

National Secondary Route 205, or just Route 205 (Spanish: Ruta Nacional Secundaria 205, or Ruta 205) is a National Road Route of Costa Rica, located in the San José province.

== Description ==
In San José province the route covers Goicoechea canton (Guadalupe, Mata de Plátano, and Rancho Redondo districts).
