= Hatillo (district) =

District in San José canton, San José province, Costa Rica

- District
- Interactive map of Hatillo
- Hatillo district location in Costa Rica
- Coordinates: 9.9187106°N 84.1033293°W
- Country: Costa Rica
- Province: San José
- Canton: San José

Area
  - Total: 4.38 km^{2} (1.69 sq mi)
- Elevation: 1,125 m (3,691 ft)

Population (2011)
  - Total: 50,511
  - Density: 11,500/km^{2} (29,900/sq mi)
- Time zone: UTC−06:00
- Postal code: 10110

Hatillo is the tenth district of the San José canton, in the San José province of Costa Rica.

== Geography ==
Hatillo has an area of 4.38 km^{2} and an elevation of 1,125 metres.

It adjoins Alajuelita Canton to the south, Mata Redonda and Hospital districts to the north and San Sebastián District to the east.

== Demographics ==
Historical population
Census	Pop.	±% p.a.
1864	537	—
1883	305	−2.93%
1892	374	+2.29%
1927	650	+1.59%
1950	2,936	+6.78%
1963	12,750	+11.96%
1973	31,036	+9.30%
1984	52,539	+4.90%
2000	54,901	+0.28%
2011	50,511	−0.75%
2022	60,723	+1.69%
Source: Instituto Nacional de Estadística y Censos; Centro Centroamericano de Población

For the 2011 census, Hatillo had a population of 50,511 inhabitants.

== Locations ==
Hatillo District includes the "barrios" (or neighbourhoods) of 15 de Setiembre, 25 de Julio, Hatillo1, Hatillo 2, Hatillo3, Hatillo 4, Hatillo 5, Hatillo 6, Hatillo 7, Hatillo 8, Hatillo Centro, Los Aserrines, Sagrada Familia, Tiribí, Topacio and Vivienda en Marcha.

== Transportation ==
=== Road transportation ===
The district is covered by the following road routes:

- National Route 39
- National Route 110
- National Route 176
- National Route 177
