= Iglesia de San Francisco de Asis (San José, Costa Rica) =

Church in San Jose, Costa Rica

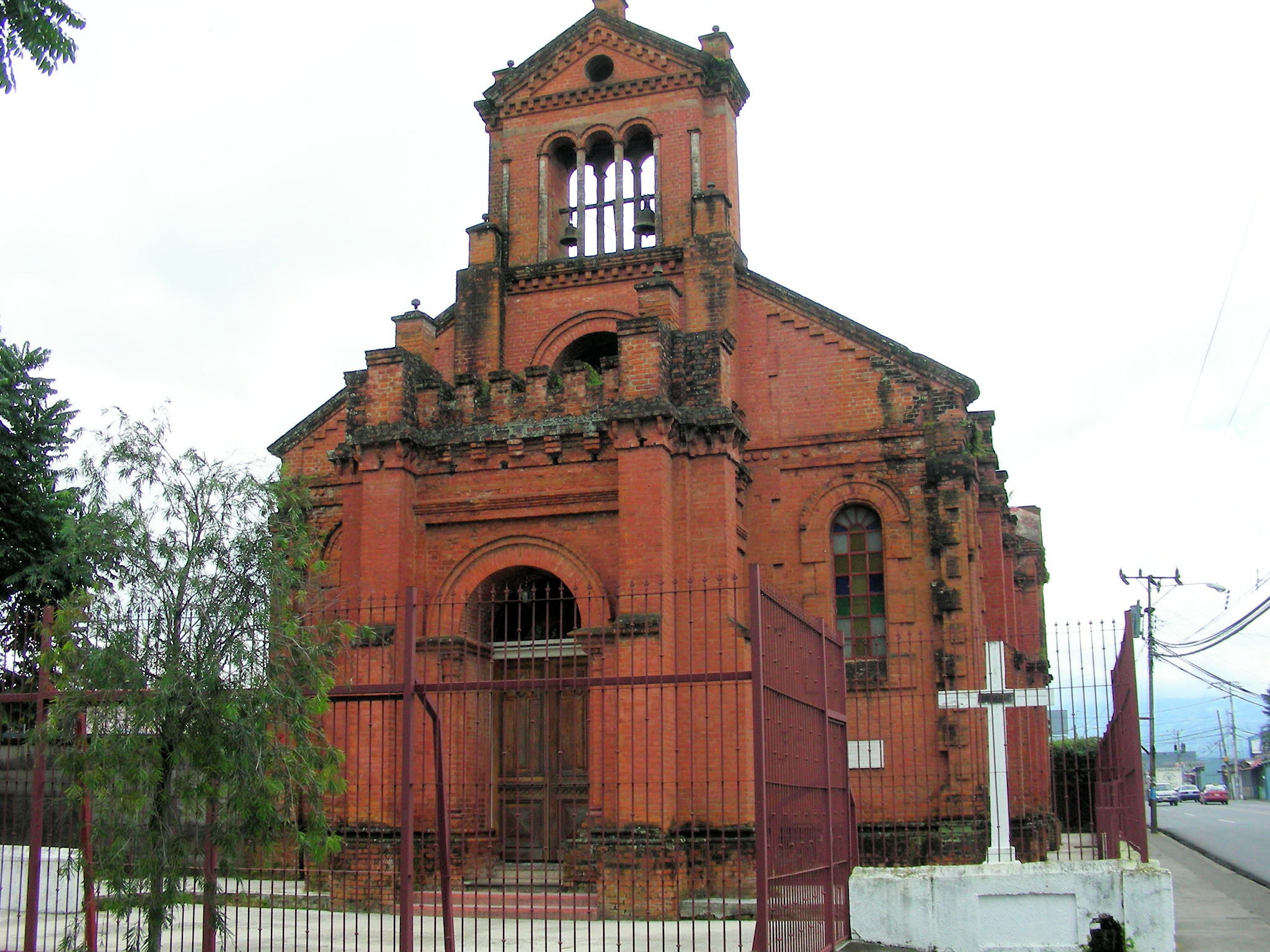
Iglesia de Ladrillo

Iglesia de San Francisco de Asis is a Roman Catholic church in San Francisco District, Goicoechea canton, San José, Costa Rica. It is dedicated to Saint Francis of Assisi.
