= San Francisco District, Goicoechea =

District in Goicoechea canton, San José province, Costa Rica

San Francisco
- District
- San Francisco district
- San Francisco district location in Costa Rica
- Coordinates: 9.9420045°N 84.0715194°W
- Country: Costa Rica
- Province: San José
- Canton: Goicoechea

Area
  - Total: 0.57 km^{2} (0.22 sq mi)
- Elevation: 1,172 m (3,845 ft)

Population (2011)
  - Total: 2,032
  - Density: 3,600/km^{2} (9,200/sq mi)
- Time zone: UTC−06:00
- Postal code: 10802

San Francisco is a district of the Goicoechea canton in the San José province of Costa Rica.

== Geography ==
San Francisco has an area of 0.57 km^{2} and an elevation of 1,172 metres.

== Demographics ==
Historical population
Census	Pop.	±% p.a.
1892	343	—
1927	868	+2.69%
1950	2,801	+5.23%
1963	3,900	+2.58%
1973	3,994	+0.24%
1984	3,138	−2.17%
2000	2,552	−1.28%
2011	2,032	−2.05%
2022	2,379	+1.44%
Source: Instituto Nacional de Estadística y Censos; Centro Centroamericano de Población

For the 2011 census, San Francisco had a population of 2,032 inhabitants.

== Transportation ==
=== Road transportation ===
The district is covered by the following road routes:

- National Route 32
- National Route 108
- National Route 218

== See also ==
- Iglesia de San Francisco de Asis (San José, Costa Rica)
