= Abraham Madriz =

Costa Rican footballer (born 2004)

Personal information
- Full name: Abraham Madriz Beaulieu
- Date of birth: 2 April 2004 (age 22)
- Place of birth: San José, Costa Rica
- Height: 1.91 m (6 ft 3 in)
- Position: Goalkeeper

Team information
- Current team: Saprissa
- Number: 40

Youth career
- Alajuelense
- 2021–2022: Saprissa

Senior career*
Years	Team	Apps	(Gls)
2022–	Saprissa	41	(0)

International career^{‡}
2019	Costa Rica U15	2	(0)
2022	Costa Rica U20	7	(0)
2026–	Costa Rica	3	(0)
- * Club domestic league appearances and goals as of 22:46, 19 September 2026 (UTC) ‡ National team caps and goals as of 23:15, 27 September 2026 (UTC)

Abraham Madriz Beaulieu (born 2 April 2004) is a Costa Rican professional footballer who plays as a goalkeeper for Liga FPD club Saprissa and the Costa Rica national team.

== Club career ==
A youth product of the club Alajuelense, Madriz moved to Saprissa in 2021 to finish his development. He started appearing for Saprissa's senior team for the 2021–22 season where he earned the 2022 Apertura. On 23 November 2022, he debuted with Saprissa in a 2–0 win over Club Sport Uruguay in the Costa Rican Cup. On 7 January 2024, he extended his contract with Saprissa until 2027.

== International career ==
Madriz was born in Costa Rica to a Costa Rican father and Canadian mother, and holds dual Costa Rican and Canadian citizenship. He was called up to the Costa Rica U20s for the 2022 CONCACAF U-20 Championship. He was called up to the Costa Rica national under-23 football teams for the 2023 Maurice Revello Tournament. He was called up to the senior Costa Rica national team for the Jordan International Tournament in March 2026.

Madriz made his debut for Costa Rica as a second-half substitute during the 3–0 loss against England on 10 June 2026.

== Career statistics ==
=== International ===
As of match played 27 September 2026

Appearances and goals by national team and year
National team	Year	Apps	Goals
Costa Rica	2026	3	0
Total		3	0

== Honours ==
Saprissa

- Liga FPD: 2022 Apertura, 2023 Clausura, Apertura 2023, Clausura 2023
- Costa Rican Cup: 2026
- Supercopa de Costa Rica: 2026
