= National Route 176 (Costa Rica) =

National Road Route in Costa Rica

National Secondary Route 176
- Ruta nacional secundaria 176

Route information
- Maintained by Ministry of Public Works and Transport
- Length: 2.335 km (1.451 mi)

Location
- Country: Costa Rica
- Provinces: San José

Highway system
- National Road Network of Costa Rica
← Route 175	→ Route 177

National Secondary Route 176, or just Route 176 (Spanish: Ruta Nacional Secundaria 176, or Ruta 176) is a National Road Route of Costa Rica located in the San José province.

== Description ==
In San José province the route covers San José canton (Hospital, Mata Redonda, and Hatillo districts).
