= Paulo Santamaría =

Costa Rican footballer

Personal information
- Full name: Paulo José Santamaría Rodríguez
- Date of birth: 24 May 2001 (age 25)
- Place of birth: San Ramón, Costa Rica
- Height: 1.87 m (6 ft 2 in)
- Position: Midfielder

Team information
- Current team: Persijap Jepara
- Number: 8

Senior career*
Years	Team	Apps	(Gls)
2019–2022	Alajuelense	2	(0)
2020	→ Juventud Escazuceña (loan)	15	(0)
2021–2022	→ Pérez Zeledón (loan)	23	(0)
2022	→ Sporting (loan)	18	(1)
2023–2025	Sporting	50	(7)
2025	→ Herediano (loan)	3	(0)
2025–2026	Guadalupe	11	(1)
2026–	Persijap Jepara	3	(0)

International career
2023	Costa Rica U23	2	(0)
- * Club domestic league appearances and goals as of 16 October 2026

Paulo José Santamaría Rodríguez (born 24 May 2001) is a Costa Rican professional footballer who plays as a midfielder for Super League club Persijap Jepara.

== Club career ==
Born in San Ramón, Costa Rica, Santamaría represented Alajuelense as a youth. He made his first-team debut on 27 January 2019, coming on as a substitute in a 1–1 draw over Limón. In the following year, he moved on loan to Escazuceña. Santamaría returned to Alajuelense but subsequently served another loans at Pérez Zeledón and Sporting. Santamaría then left Alajuelense and officially extended his contract with Sporting, before being loaned out for a season to Herediano in early 2025.

After playing for Sporting and Herediano, Santamaría continued his career by joining Guadalupe in June 2025. He made his club debut on 24 July 2025, coming on as a substitute in a 0–0 draw over his former club Herediano. He established himself within the first-team options, accumulating domestic experience and featuring as a primary utility choice in the central core before seeking a move abroad.

=== Persijap Jepara ===
In August 2026, Santamaría completed a transfer to Southeast Asia, officially signing with Indonesian top-flight side Persijap Jepara ahead of the 2026–27 Super League campaign. He was introduced as one of the club's eight new foreign signings brought in under manager Juan Cortés to strengthen the structural engine room of the squad. He made his league debut for Persijap Jepara on 6 September 2026, coming on as a starter in a 2–0 lose over Madura United.

== International career ==
In May 2023, he was named to the 22-man Costa Rica U23 squad for the 2023 Maurice Revello Tournament. Then, he made two appearances against France U23 and Qatar U23 in that tournament.
