= National Route 167 (Costa Rica) =

National Road Route in Costa Rica

National Secondary Route 167
- Ruta nacional secundaria 167

Route information
- Maintained by Ministry of Public Works and Transport
- Length: 4.840 km (3.007 mi)

Location
- Country: Costa Rica
- Provinces: San José

Highway system
- National Road Network of Costa Rica
← Route 165	→ Route 168

National Secondary Route 167, or just Route 167 (Spanish: Ruta Nacional Secundaria 167, or Ruta 167) is a National Road Route of Costa Rica located in the San José province.

== Description ==
In San José province the route covers San José canton (Hospital and Mata Redonda districts) and Escazú canton (San Rafael district).
