= Rancho Redondo =

District in Goicoechea canton, San José province, Costa Rica

- District
- Rancho Redondo district
- Rancho Redondo district location in Costa Rica
- Coordinates: 9.9613568°N 83.9450849°W
- Country: Costa Rica
- Province: San José
- Canton: Goicoechea

Area
  - Total: 13.38 km^{2} (5.17 sq mi)
- Elevation: 2,048 m (6,719 ft)

Population (2011)
  - Total: 2,538
  - Density: 189.7/km^{2} (491.3/sq mi)
- Time zone: UTC−06:00
- Postal code: 10806

Rancho Redondo is a district of the Goicoechea canton, in the San José province of Costa Rica.

== Geography ==
Rancho Redondo has an area of 13.38 km^{2} and an elevation of 2,048 metres.

== Demographics ==
Historical population
Census	Pop.	±% p.a.
1892	263	—
1927	339	+0.73%
1950	432	+1.06%
1963	816	+5.01%
1973	1,231	+4.20%
1984	1,491	+1.76%
2000	2,718	+3.82%
2011	2,538	−0.62%
2022	3,325	+2.49%
Source: Instituto Nacional de Estadística y Censos; Centro Centroamericano de Población

For the 2011 census, Rancho Redondo had a population of 2,538 inhabitants.

== Transportation ==
=== Road transportation ===
The district is covered by the following road routes:

- National Route 205
- National Route 218
