= Escuela San Felipe =

Saint Philip School
- Escuela San Felipe

Location
- San Felipe district Alajuelita Canton; San José; Costa Rica
- Coordinates: 9.901853°N 84.10477°W

Information
- Founded: 1966

Escuela San Felipe is a school in the San Felipe district of Alajuelita Canton, San José, Costa Rica. Founded in 1966, the school initially only had two classrooms.

== See also ==
- Education in Costa Rica
