= Mata de Plátano District =

District in Goicoechea canton, San José province, Costa Rica

Mata de Plátano
- District
- Interactive map of Mata de Plátano
- Mata de Plátano district location in Costa Rica
- Coordinates: 9.9550225°N 83.9990136°W
- Country: Costa Rica
- Province: San José
- Canton: Goicoechea

Area
  - Total: 7.85 km^{2} (3.03 sq mi)
- Elevation: 1,355 m (4,446 ft)

Population (2011)
  - Total: 17,370
  - Density: 2,210/km^{2} (5,730/sq mi)
- Time zone: UTC−06:00
- Postal code: 10804

Mata de Plátano is a district of the Goicoechea canton, in the San José province of Costa Rica.

== Geography ==
Mata de Plátano has an area of 7.85 km^{2} and an elevation of 1,355 metres.

== Demographics ==
Historical population
Census	Pop.	±% p.a.
1892	228	—
1927	557	+2.58%
1950	955	+2.37%
1963	1,691	+4.49%
1973	3,569	+7.76%
1984	7,490	+6.97%
2000	16,206	+4.94%
2011	17,370	+0.63%
2022	22,461	+2.36%
Source: Instituto Nacional de Estadística y Censos; Centro Centroamericano de Población

For the 2011 census, Mata de Plátano had a population of 17,370 inhabitants.

== Economy ==
One of its main economic activities is the plantation of cypress, used as Christmas trees in Costa Rica. Along with its immediate neighbors San Ramón District and San Rafael District, it forms one of the main cypress production areas in all the Costa Rican Central Region.

== Transportation ==
=== Road transportation ===
The district is covered by the following road routes:

- National Route 205

== Government ==
The syndic is William García Arias.
