= National Route 217 (Costa Rica) =

National Road Route in Costa Rica

National Secondary Route 217
- Ruta nacional secundaria 217

Route information
- Maintained by Ministry of Public Works and Transport
- Length: 7.460 km (4.635 mi)

Location
- Country: Costa Rica
- Provinces: San José

Highway system
- National Road Network of Costa Rica
← Route 216	→ Route 218

National Secondary Route 217, or just Route 217 (Spanish: Ruta Nacional Secundaria 217, or Ruta 217) is a National Road Route of Costa Rica, located in the San José province.

== Description ==
In San José province the route covers Desamparados canton (San Juan de Dios and San Rafael Abajo districts), Aserrí canton (Aserrí district), and Alajuelita canton (San Josecito, San Antonio, and Concepción districts).
