= Alajuelita =

District in Alajuelita, San José, Costa Rica

- District
- Interactive map of Alajuelita
- Alajuelita district location in Costa Rica
- Coordinates: 9.9034638°N 84.0995923°W
- Country: Costa Rica
- Province: San José
- Canton: Alajuelita

Area
  - Total: 1.3 km^{2} (0.50 sq mi)
- Elevation: 1,130 m (3,710 ft)

Population (2011)
  - Total: 11,988
  - Density: 9,200/km^{2} (24,000/sq mi)
- Time zone: UTC−06:00
- Postal code: 11001

Alajuelita is a district of the Alajuelita canton, in the San José province of Costa Rica.

== Geography ==
Alajuelita has an area of 1.3 km^{2} and an elevation of 1,130 metres.

== Demographics ==
Historical population
Census	Pop.	±% p.a.
1864	1,630	—
1883	1,613	−0.06%
1892	2,844	+6.50%
1927	731	−3.81%
1950	1,582	+3.41%
1963	4,280	+7.96%
1973	6,673	+4.54%
1984	8,280	+1.98%
2000	12,247	+2.48%
2011	11,988	−0.19%
2022	12,611	+0.46%
Source: Instituto Nacional de Estadística y Censos; Centro Centroamericano de Población

For the 2011 census, Alajuelita had a population of 11,988 inhabitants.

== Transportation ==
=== Road transportation ===
The district is covered by the following road routes:

- National Route 105
- National Route 110

== Culture ==
The Santuario Nacional Santo Cristo de Esquipulas is located in this district.
