= Pavas =

District in San José canton, San José province, Costa Rica

- District
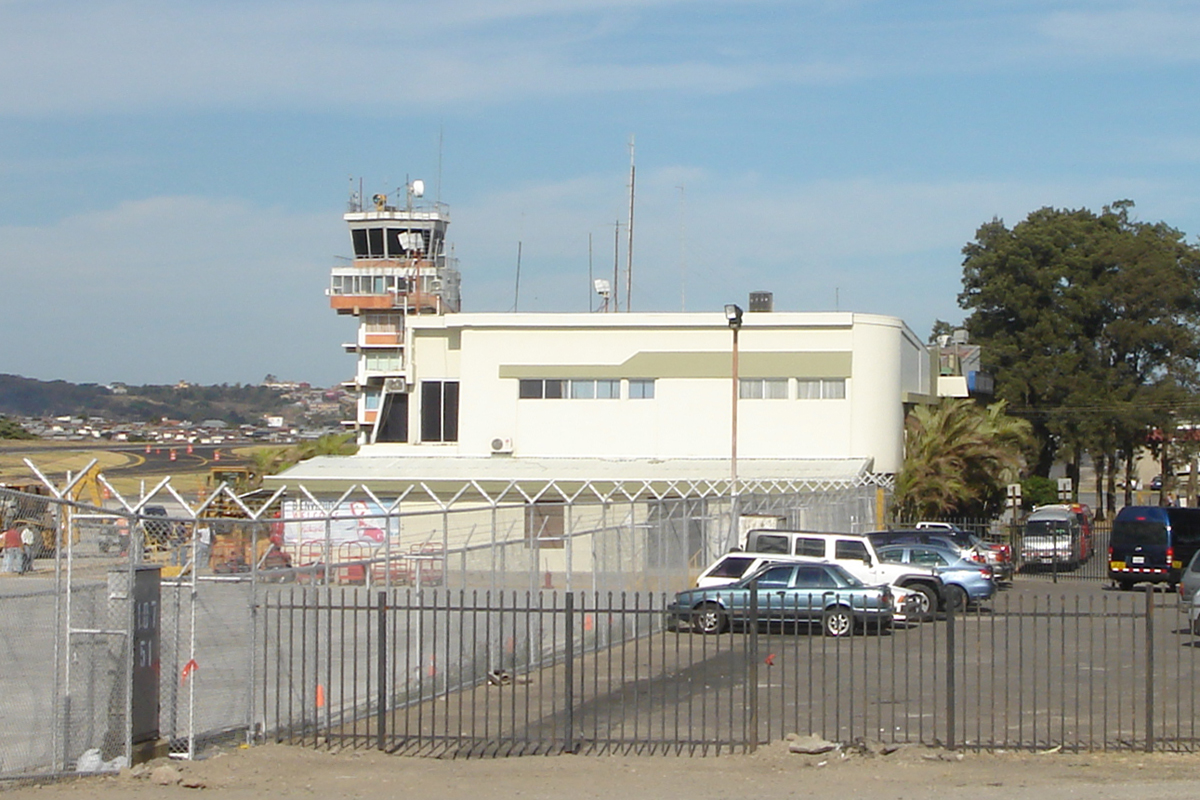
- Control tower and main terminal building, Tobias Bolaños International Airport, Pavas, San José, Costa Rica
- Pavas district
- Pavas district location in Costa Rica
- Coordinates: 9.9495224°N 84.1391744°W
- Country: Costa Rica
- Province: San José
- Canton: San José

Area
  - Total: 9.39 km^{2} (3.63 sq mi)
- Elevation: 1,044 m (3,425 ft)

Population (2011)
  - Total: 71,384
  - Density: 7,600/km^{2} (19,700/sq mi)
- Time zone: UTC−06:00
- Postal code: 10109

Pavas is the ninth district of the San José canton, in the San José province of Costa Rica. The district comprises Tobías Bolaños International Airport, San José's domestic airport.

== Geography ==
Pavas has an area of 9.39 km^{2} (the largest district in the canton) and an elevation of 1,044 metres.

It is adjacent to Escazú Canton to the south, and to Uruca and Mata Redonda districts to the north and east respectively.

== Demographics ==
Historical population
Census	Pop.	±% p.a.
1883	732	—
1892	954	+2.99%
1927	1,499	+1.30%
1950	2,127	+1.53%
1963	5,530	+7.63%
1973	18,068	+12.57%
1984	31,690	+5.24%
2000	76,177	+5.63%
2011	71,384	−0.59%
2022	83,573	+1.44%
Source: Instituto Nacional de Estadística y Censos; Centro Centroamericano de Población

For the 2011 census, Pavas had a population of 71,384 inhabitants.

== Locations ==
Pavas District includes the "barrios" (or neighbourhoods) of Aeropuerto, Alfa, Bribri, Favorita Norte, Favorita Sur, Geroma, Gerona, Hispana, Libertad, Lomas del Río, Llanos del Sol, María Reina, Metrópolis, Pavas Centro, Residencia del Oeste, Rincón Grande, Rohrmoser, Rotonda, San Pedro, Santa Bárbara, Santa Catalina, Tajo, Triángulo, Villa Esperanza, and Zona Industrial.

== Education ==
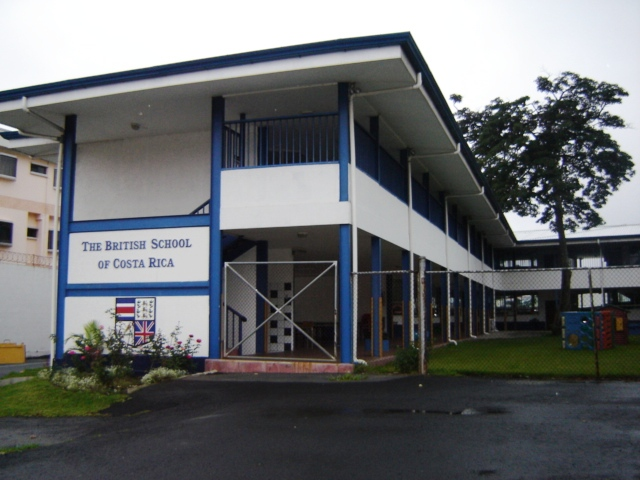
British School of Costa Rica

International schools include:

- British School of Costa Rica
- Colegio Humboldt (Humboldt-Schule) - German school

== Transportation ==
=== Road transportation ===
The district is covered by the following road routes:

- National Route 39
- National Route 104
- National Route 174

=== Rail transportation ===
The Interurbano Line operated by Incofer goes through this district.
