= Concepción District, Alajuelita =

District in Alajuelita canton, San José province, Costa Rica

Concepción
- District
- Interactive map of Concepción
- Concepción district location in Costa Rica
- Coordinates: 9.8898038°N 84.092889°W
- Country: Costa Rica
- Province: San José
- Canton: Alajuelita

Area
  - Total: 2.4 km^{2} (0.93 sq mi)
- Elevation: 1,120 m (3,670 ft)

Population (2011)
  - Total: 18,721
  - Density: 7,800/km^{2} (20,000/sq mi)
- Time zone: UTC−06:00
- Postal code: 11004

Concepción is a district of the Alajuelita canton, in the San José province of Costa Rica.

== Geography ==
Concepción has an area of 2.4 km^{2} and an elevation of 1,120 metres.

== Demographics ==
Historical population
| Census | Pop. | ±% p.a. |
|---|---|---|
| 1927 | 371 | — |
| 1950 | 492 | +1.23% |
| 1963 | 3,126 | +15.28% |
| 1973 | 9,280 | +11.50% |
| 1984 | 12,175 | +2.50% |
| 2000 | 19,268 | +2.91% |
| 2011 | 18,721 | −0.26% |
| 2022 | 17,269 | −0.73% |
Source: Instituto Nacional de Estadística y Censos; Centro Centroamericano de Población

For the 2011 census, Concepción had a population of 18,721 inhabitants.

== Transportation ==
=== Road transportation ===
The district is covered by the following road routes:

- National Route 105
- National Route 217
