= National Route 110 (Costa Rica) =

National Road Route in Costa Rica

National Secondary Route 110
- Ruta nacional secundaria 110

Route information
- Maintained by Ministry of Public Works and Transport
- Length: 3.460 km (2.150 mi)

Location
- Country: Costa Rica
- Provinces: San José

Highway system
- National Road Network of Costa Rica
| ← Route 109 | → Route 111 |

National Secondary Route 110, or just Route 110 (Spanish: Ruta Nacional Secundaria 110, or Ruta 110) is a National Road Route of Costa Rica, located in the San José province.

== Description ==
In San José province the route covers San José canton (Hospital, Hatillo districts) andAlajuelita canton (Alajuelita district).
