= National Route 105 (Costa Rica) =

National Road Route in Costa Rica

National Secondary Route 105
- Ruta nacional secundaria 105

Route information
- Maintained by Ministry of Public Works and Transport
- Length: 13.680 km (8.500 mi)

Location
- Country: Costa Rica
- Provinces: San José

Highway system
- National Road Network of Costa Rica
← Route 104	→ Route 106

National Secondary Route 105, or just Route 105 (Spanish: Ruta Nacional Secundaria 105, or Ruta 105) is a National Road Route of Costa Rica, located in the San José province.

== Description ==
In San José province the route covers Escazú canton (Escazú, San Antonio, San Rafael districts), Desamparados canton (San Rafael Abajo district), Alajuelita canton (Alajuelita, San Josecito, San Antonio, Concepción districts).
