= San Josécito =

District in Alajuelita canton, San José province, Costa Rica

San Josecito
- District
- San Josecito district
- San Josecito district location in Costa Rica
- Coordinates: 9.8885156°N 84.1054941°W
- Country: Costa Rica
- Province: San José
- Canton: Alajuelita

Area
  - Total: 2.42 km^{2} (0.93 sq mi)
- Elevation: 1,200 m (3,900 ft)

Population (2011)
  - Total: 10,506
  - Density: 4,340/km^{2} (11,200/sq mi)
- Time zone: UTC−06:00
- Postal code: 11002

San Josecito is a district of the Alajuelita canton, in the San José province of Costa Rica.

== Geography ==
San Josecito has an area of 2.42 km^{2} and an elevation of 1,200 metres.

== Demographics ==
Historical population
Census	Pop.	±% p.a.
1927	596	—
1950	792	+1.24%
1963	1,570	+5.40%
1973	3,445	+8.18%
1984	4,872	+3.20%
2000	8,500	+3.54%
2011	10,506	+1.94%
2022	9,925	−0.52%
Source: Instituto Nacional de Estadística y Censos; Centro Centroamericano de Población

For the 2011 census, San Josecito had a population of 10,506 inhabitants.

== Transportation ==
=== Road transportation ===
The district is covered by the following road routes:

- National Route 105
- National Route 217
