= National Route 177 (Costa Rica) =

National Road Route in Costa Rica

National Secondary Route 177
- Ruta nacional secundaria 177

Route information
- Maintained by Ministry of Public Works and Transport
- Length: 5.095 km (3.166 mi)

Location
- Country: Costa Rica
- Provinces: San José

Highway system
- National Road Network of Costa Rica
← Route 176	→ Route 180

National Secondary Route 177, or just Route 177 (Spanish: Ruta Nacional Secundaria 177, or Ruta 177) is a National Road Route of Costa Rica located in the San José province.

== Description ==
In San José province the route covers San José canton (Mata Redonda and Hatillo districts), Escazú canton (Escazú and San Rafael districts), and Alajuelita canton (San Felipe district).
