= Sebastián Acuña =

Costa Rican footballer (born 2002)

Personal information
- Full name: Sebastián Acuña Murillo
- Date of birth: 25 June 2002 (age 24)
- Place of birth: Quesada, Costa Rica
- Height: 1.74 m (5 ft 9 in)
- Position: Defensive midfielder

Team information
- Current team: Deportivo Saprissa
- Number: 25

Youth career
- –2020: San Carlos

Senior career*
Years	Team	Apps	(Gls)
2020–2025	San Carlos	96	(5)
2025–	Deportivo Saprissa	54	(2)

International career^{‡}
2023	Costa Rica U22	5	(1)
2023	Costa Rica U23	8	(1)
2023–	Costa Rica	9	(0)
Medal record
Men's football
Representing Costa Rica
Central American and Caribbean Games
Silver medal – second place	2023 San Salvador	Team
- * Club domestic league appearances and goals as of 20:28, 19 September 2026 (UTC) ‡ National team caps and goals as of 23:15, 4 October 2026 (UTC)

Sebastián Acuña Murillo (born 25 June 2002) is a Costa Rican professional footballer who plays as a defensive midfielder for Liga FPD club Deportivo Saprissa and the Costa Rica national team.

== Club career ==
Acuña began his career with San Carlos making his professional league debut on 10 June 2020 playing the full match in a 5–2 win over Municipal Grecia. In December 2024, after nearly 11 appearances in all competitions for San Carlos, Acuña agreed to join Deportivo Saprissa on a four-year deal.

== International career ==
Acuña was part of the Costa Rica U23 that earned a silver medal in the football at the 2023 Central American and Caribbean Games. Acuña made his senior international debut for Costa Rica on 8 September 2023, playing the first half of a friendly against Saudi Arabia.

In June 2023, he took part in the Maurice Revello Tournament in France.

== Career statistics ==
=== International ===
As of matches played 4 October 2026

Appearances and goals by national team and year
National team	Year	Apps	Goals
Costa Rica	2023	2	0
Costa Rica	2024	3	0
Costa Rica	2026	4	0
Total		9	0
