= Jostin Tellería =

Costa Rican footballer (born 2003)

Personal information
- Full name: Jostin Tellería Alfaro
- Date of birth: 10 April 2003 (age 23)
- Place of birth: San José, Costa Rica
- Position: Midfielder

Team information
- Current team: Puntarenas (on loan from Saprissa)

Youth career
- Saprissa

Senior career*
Years	Team	Apps	(Gls)
2019–	Saprissa	9	(1)
2021–2022	→ CF Intercity (loan)	2	(0)
2023	→ Sporting FC (loan)	22	(1)
2024–	→ Puntarenas FC (loan)	0	(0)

International career^{‡}
2022	Costa Rica U20	2	(0)
- * Club domestic league appearances and goals as of 22 January 2024 ‡ National team caps and goals as of 05:11, 27 June 2022 (UTC)

Jostin Tellería Alfaro (born 10 April 2003) is a Costa Rican professional footballer who currently plays as a midfielder for Puntarenas on loan from Saprissa.

== Career ==
In 2024, Tellería was loaned out to Puntarenas FC from Saprissa.

== Career statistics ==
=== Club ===
As of 28 May 2021.

Club	Season	League			Cup		Continental		Other		Total	
Club	Season	Division	Apps	Goals	Apps	Goals	Apps	Goals	Apps	Goals	Apps	Goals
Saprissa	2019–20	Liga FPD	1	0	0	0	0	0	0	0	1	0
Saprissa	2020–21	Liga FPD	8	1	0	0	0	0	1 (Note: Appearances in the Supercopa de Costa Rica)	0	9	1
Career total			9	1	0	0	0	0	1	0	10	1

== Personal life ==
Tellería is of Chilean descent since his paternal grandfather is Chilean.

== Honours ==
Saprissa

- Liga FPD: Clausura 2021
