= Costa Rica national under-23 football team =

Costa Rica U-23
- Nickname(s): Ticos, La Tricolor, La Sele (Selección)
- Association: Federación Costarricense de Fútbol
- Confederation: CONCACAF (North America)
- Sub-confederation: UNCAF (Central America)
- FIFA code: CRC
First colours	Second colours

First international
- Costa Rica 0–3 Iraq (Kyiv, Soviet Union; 21 July 1980)

Biggest win
- Costa Rica 4–2 Portugal (Athens, Greece; 18 August 2004)

Biggest defeat
- Argentina 4–0 Costa Rica (Patras, Greece; 21 August 2004); Mexico 4–0 Costa Rica (Carson, United States; 2 October 2015)

Olympic Games
- Appearances: 1 (first in 2004)
- Best result: Quarter-finals (2004)

Pan American Games
- Appearances: 3 (first in 1999)
- Best result: Fourth place (2011)

The Costa Rica national under-23 football team (also known as the Costa Rica Olympic football team) represents Costa Rica in international football competitions during Olympic Games and Pan American Games. The selection is limited to players under the age of 23, except for three overage players. The team is controlled by the Costa Rican Football Federation.

== Competitive record ==
=== Olympic Games ===
Olympic Games record
Year	Round	Position	Pld	W	D*	L	GF	GA	Squad
Until 1988	See Costa Rica national football team								
(Spain) 1992	Did not qualify								
(United States) 1996	Did not qualify								
(Australia) 2000	Did not qualify								
(Greece) 2004	Quarter-finals	8th	4	1	1	2	4	8	Squad
(China) 2008	Did not qualify								
(United Kingdom) 2012	Did not qualify								
(Brazil) 2016	Did not qualify								
(Japan) 2020	Did not qualify								
(France) 2024	Did not qualify								
Total	Quarter-finals	1/9	4	1	1	2	4	8	—

=== Pan American Games ===
Pan American Games record
Year	Round	Position	Pld	W	D*	L	GF	GA	Squad
Until 1995	See Costa Rica national football team								
(Canada) 1999	Group stage	5th	4	1	3	0	5	4	Squad
(Dominican Republic) 2003	Did not qualify								
(Brazil) 2007	Group stage	9th	3	0	1	2	2	5	Squad
(Mexico) 2011	Fourth place	4th	4	2	0	2	4	7	Squad
(Canada) 2015	Did not qualify								
(Peru) 2019	Did not qualify								
(Chile) 2023	Did not qualify								
Total	Fourth place	3/7	11	3	4	4	11	16	—

== Results and fixtures ==
Win Draw Loss

v

v

== Players ==
=== Current squad ===
The following players were named in the squad for the 2023 Maurice Revello Tournament between 5 and 18 June 2023.

Caps and goals are correct as of 25 March 2021, after the match against Dominican Republic.

No.	Pos.	Player	Date of birth (age)	Caps	Goals	Club
	GK	Alexandre Lezcano	26 August 2001 (age 25)	0	0	(Costa Rican Football Federation) Santos de Guápiles
	GK	Abraham Madriz	2 April 2004 (age 22)	0	0	(Costa Rican Football Federation) Saprissa
	DF	Sebastián Acuña	25 June 2002 (age 24)	0	0	(Costa Rican Football Federation) San Carlos
	DF	Jorkaeff Azofeifa	9 February 2001 (age 25)	0	0	(Costa Rican Football Federation) Guadalupe
	DF	Carlos Barahona	22 August 2002 (age 24)	0	0	(Cyprus Football Association) Apollon Limassol
	DF	Matthew Bolaños	5 July 2002 (age 24)	0	0	(Costa Rican Football Federation) Grecia
	DF	Keral Ríos	5 March 2003 (age 23)	0	0	(Costa Rican Football Federation) Pérez Zeledón
	DF	Douglas Sequiera	16 September 2003 (age 23)	0	0	(Costa Rican Football Federation) Santos de Guápiles
	DF	Gerald Taylor	28 May 2001 (age 25)	0	0	(Costa Rican Football Federation) Saprissa
	DF	Santiago van der Putten	25 June 2004 (age 22)	0	0	(Royal Spanish Football Federation) Real Betis
	DF	Guillermo Villalobos	7 June 2001 (age 25)	0	0	(Costa Rican Football Federation) Pérez Zeledón
	MF	Brandon Aguilera	28 June 2003 (age 23)	0	0	(Portuguese Football Federation) Estoril
	MF	Alejandro Bran	5 March 2001 (age 25)	0	0	(Costa Rican Football Federation) Guanacasteca
	MF	Ricardo Peña	15 July 2004 (age 22)	0	0	(Royal Spanish Football Federation) Real Betis
	MF	Damián Rivera	8 December 2002 (age 23)	0	0	(United States Soccer Federation) New England Revolution
	MF	Royner Rojas	11 June 2002 (age 24)	0	0	(Costa Rican Football Federation) Herediano
	MF	Paulo Santamaría	24 May 2001 (age 25)	0	0	(Costa Rican Football Federation) Sporting San José
	MF	Álvaro Zamora	9 March 2002 (age 24)	0	0	(Hellenic Football Federation) Aris
	FW	Anthony Hernández	11 October 2001 (age 25)	0	0	(Costa Rican Football Federation) Puntarenas
	FW	Cameron Johnson	16 April 2004 (age 22)	0	0	(United States Soccer Federation) Inter Miami CF
	FW	Doryan Rodríguez	18 January 2003 (age 23)	0	0	(Costa Rican Football Federation) Alajuelense
	FW	Kenneth Vargas	17 April 2002 (age 24)	0	0	(Costa Rican Football Federation) Herediano
	FW	Hakeem Morgan	13 November 2001 (age 24)	0	0	(United States Soccer Federation) St. Olaf College

== Honours ==
- CONCACAF Olympic Qualifying Tournament
  - Runners-up (1): 2004

== See also ==
- Costa Rica national football team
- Costa Rica national under-20 football team
- Costa Rica national under-17 football team
- Costa Rica at the FIFA World Cup
