= Guadalupe, Costa Rica =

District in Goicoechea canton, San José province, Costa Rica

Guadalupe
- District
- Interactive map of Guadalupe
- Guadalupe district location in Costa Rica
- Coordinates: 9.9494107°N 84.0512492°W
- Country: Costa Rica
- Province: San José
- Canton: Goicoechea

Area
  - Total: 2.38 km^{2} (0.92 sq mi)
- Elevation: 1,204 m (3,950 ft)

Population (2011)
  - Total: 20,663
  - Density: 8,680/km^{2} (22,500/sq mi)
- Time zone: UTC−06:00
- Postal code: 10801

Guadalupe is a district of the Goicoechea canton, in the San José province of Costa Rica. It is the head city of the Goicoechea Canton, and now fully incorporated in the Metropolitan Area of San Jose.

== History ==
Guadalupe acquired the title of city on 10 August 1920

== Geography ==
Guadalupe has an area of 2.38 km^{2} and an elevation of 1,204 metres.

== Demographics ==
Historical population
Census	Pop.	±% p.a.
1864	2,602	—
1883	2,763	+0.32%
1892	1,369	−7.51%
1927	2,699	+1.96%
1950	9,604	+5.67%
1963	21,958	+6.57%
1973	27,016	+2.09%
1984	25,506	−0.52%
2000	23,723	−0.45%
2011	20,663	−1.25%
2022	20,913	+0.11%
Source: Instituto Nacional de Estadística y Censos; Centro Centroamericano de Población

For the 2011 census, Guadalupe had a population of 20,663 inhabitants.

== Transportation ==
=== Road transportation ===
The district is covered by the following road routes:

- National Route 39
- National Route 108
- National Route 200
- National Route 201
- National Route 205
- National Route 218

== Notable people ==
- Ulises Segura - Soccer player for D.C. United
