= Goicoechea (canton) =

Canton in San José province, Costa Rica

- Canton
- Flag Seal
- Interactive map of Goicoechea
- Goicoechea canton location in San José Province Goicoechea canton location in Costa Rica
- Coordinates: 9.9560222°N 83.984858°W
- Country: Costa Rica
- Province: San José
- Creation: 6 August 1891
- Head city: Guadalupe
- Districts: Districts: Guadalupe; San Francisco; Calle Blancos; Mata de Plátano; Ipís; Rancho Redondo; Purral

Government
  - Type: Municipality
  - Body: Municipalidad de Goicoechea
  - Mayor: Fernando Miguel Chavarría Quirós (PLN)

Area
  - Total: 31.7 km^{2} (12.2 sq mi)
- Elevation: 1,364 m (4,475 ft)

Population (2011)
  - Total: 115,084
  - Estimate (2022): 132,104
  - Density: 3,630/km^{2} (9,400/sq mi)
- Time zone: UTC−06:00
- Canton code: 108
- Website: www.munigoicoechea.com

Goicoechea is a canton in the San José province of Costa Rica.

== History ==
Goicoechea was created on 6 August 1891 by decree 66.

== Government ==
=== Mayor ===
According to Costa Rica's Municipal Code, mayors are elected every four years by the population of the canton. As of the latest municipal elections in 2024, the National Liberation Party candidate, Fernando Miguel Chavarría Quirós, was elected mayor of the canton with 25.34% of the votes, with Reina Irene Campos Jiménez and Valeria Fernández Castillo as first and second vice mayors, respectively.

Mayors since the 2002 elections
Period	Name	Party
2002–2006	Carlos Luis Murillo Rodríguez	PUSC
2006–2010	Óscar Figueroa Fieujeam	PLN
2010–2016	Óscar Figueroa Fieujeam	PLN
2016–2020	Ana Lucía Madrigal Faerron	PLN
2020–2024	Rafael Ángel Vargas Brenes	PLN
2024–2028	Fernando Miguel Chavarría Quirós	PLN

=== Municipal Council ===
Like the mayor and vice mayors, members of the Municipal Council (called regidores) are elected every four years. Goicoechea's Municipal Council has 9 seats for regidores and their substitutes, who can participate in meetings but not vote unless the owning regidor (regidor propietario) is absent. The current president of the Municipal Council is Broad Front member Gloriana Diorela Carmona Seravalli, with Social Christian Unity Party member Carlos Luis Murillo Rodríguez as vice president. The Municipal Council's composition for the 2024-2028 period is as follows:

Current composition of the Municipal Council of Goicoechea after the 2024 municipal elections
Political parties in the Municipal Council of Goicoechea
Political party	Regidores		
Political party	№	Owner	Substitute
National Liberation Party (PLN)	2	Carmen María Martínez Barahona	Carolina Araúz Durán
National Liberation Party (PLN)	2	Rafael Ángel Vargas Brenes	Christian Muñoz Rojas
Citizen's Change Coalition (CCAC)	2	Melissa Valdivia Zúñiga	Rosaura Castellón Navarro
Citizen's Change Coalition (CCAC)	2	Luis Carlos Barquero Araya	Sixto Araya Araya
Social Christian Unity Party (PUSC)	2	Carlos Luis Murillo Rodríguez^{(VP)}	Emilio José Fallas Sandí
Social Christian Unity Party (PUSC)	2	Grettel Virginia Amador Rojas	Marisol Campos Arias
United We Can (UP)	1	William Fallas Bogarin	Alex Gerardo Zúñiga Muñoz
Social Democratic Progress Party (PSD)	1	María Lorena Ortíz Salazar	Gabriela Jiménez Araya
Broad Front (FA)	1	Gloriana Diorela Carmona Seravalli^{(P)}	Johanna Arlete Oviedo Mora

== Geography ==
Goicoechea has an area of 31.7 km^{2} (12.2 sq mi) and a mean elevation of 1,364 m (4,475 ft).

The elongated canton curves its way through the suburban areas just north of San José, climbing steadily into the Cordillera Central (Central Mountain Range) until it reaches it eastern limit between the Durazno River (on its northern boundary) and the Tiribí River (on the south).

== Districts ==
The canton of Goicoechea is subdivided into the following districts:

1. Guadalupe
2. San Francisco
3. Calle Blancos
4. Mata de Plátano
5. Ipís
6. Rancho Redondo
7. Purral

== Demographics ==
Historical population
Census	Pop.	±% p.a.
1892	3,341	—
1927	6,496	+1.92%
1950	21,093	+5.25%
1963	44,110	+5.84%
1973	61,607	+3.40%
1984	79,931	+2.40%
2000	117,532	+2.44%
2011	115,084	−0.19%
2022	132,104	+1.26%
Source: Instituto Nacional de Estadística y Censos; Centro Centroamericano de Población

Goicoechea was estimated to have a population of 132,104 in 2022, up from 115,084 at the time of the 2011 census.

According to a publication by the United Nations Development Programme, Goicoechea has a Human Development Index score of 0.758, ranking it 10th in its province.

== Transportation ==
=== Road transportation ===
The canton is covered by the following road routes:

- National Route 32
- National Route 39
- National Route 100
- National Route 108
- National Route 109
- National Route 200
- National Route 201
- National Route 205
- National Route 216
- National Route 218

=== Rail transportation ===
The Interurbano Line operated by Incofer goes through this canton.
