= San Antonio District, Alajuelita =

District in Alajuelita canton, San José province, Costa Rica

San Antonio
- District
- San Antonio district
- San Antonio district location in Costa Rica
- Coordinates: 9.8713526°N 84.1233734°W
- Country: Costa Rica
- Province: San José
- Canton: Alajuelita

Area
  - Total: 10.22 km^{2} (3.95 sq mi)
- Elevation: 1,410 m (4,630 ft)

Population (2011)
  - Total: 4,739
  - Density: 463.7/km^{2} (1,201/sq mi)
- Time zone: UTC−06:00
- Postal code: 11003

San Antonio is a district of the Alajuelita canton, in the San José province of Costa Rica.

== Geography ==
San Antonio has an area of 10.22 km^{2} and an elevation of 1,410 metres.

== Demographics ==
Historical population
Census	Pop.	±% p.a.
1927	479	—
1950	395	−0.83%
1963	530	+2.29%
1973	725	+3.18%
1984	1,336	+5.71%
2000	3,193	+5.60%
2011	4,739	+3.65%
2022	5,164	+0.78%
Source: Instituto Nacional de Estadística y Censos; Centro Centroamericano de Población

For the 2011 census, San Antonio had a population of 4,739 inhabitants.

== Transportation ==
=== Road transportation ===
The district is covered by the following road routes:

- National Route 105
- National Route 217
