= San Felipe District, Alajuelita =

District in Alajuelita canton, San José province, Costa Rica

San Felipe
- District
- San Felipe district
- San Felipe district location in Costa Rica
- Coordinates: 9.9124787°N 84.1131195°W
- Country: Costa Rica
- Province: San José
- Canton: Alajuelita

Area
  - Total: 5.1 km^{2} (2.0 sq mi)
- Elevation: 1,110 m (3,640 ft)

Population (2011)
  - Total: 31,649
  - Density: 6,200/km^{2} (16,000/sq mi)
- Time zone: UTC−06:00
- Postal code: 11005

San Felipe is a district of the Alajuelita canton, in the San José province of Costa Rica.

== Geography ==
San Felipe has an area of 5.1 km^{2} and an elevation of 1,110 metres.

== Demographics ==
Historical population
Census	Pop.	±% p.a.
1927	394	—
1950	659	+2.26%
1963	1,342	+5.62%
1973	2,890	+7.97%
1984	4,727	+4.57%
2000	27,089	+11.53%
2011	31,649	+1.42%
2022	36,043	+1.19%
Source: Instituto Nacional de Estadística y Censos; Centro Centroamericano de Población

For the 2011 census, San Felipe had a population of 31,649 inhabitants.

== Transportation ==
=== Road transportation ===
The district is covered by the following road routes:

- National Route 177
