= Ipís =

District in Goicoechea canton, San José province, Costa Rica

- District
- Interactive map of Ipís
- Ipís district location in Costa Rica
- Coordinates: 9.9638786°N 84.019566°W
- Country: Costa Rica
- Province: San José
- Canton: Goicoechea

Area
  - Total: 2.37 km^{2} (0.92 sq mi)
- Elevation: 1,340 m (4,400 ft)

Population (2011)
  - Total: 26,033
  - Density: 11,000/km^{2} (28,400/sq mi)
- Time zone: UTC−06:00
- Postal code: 10805

Ipís is a district of the Goicoechea canton, in the San José province of Costa Rica.

== Geography ==
Ipís has an area of 2.37 km^{2} and an elevation of 1,340 metres.

== Demographics ==
Historical population
Census	Pop.	±% p.a.
1927	631	—
1950	1,501	+3.84%
1963	4,909	+9.54%
1973	13,389	+10.55%
1984	26,151	+6.27%
2000	26,155	+0.00%
2011	26,033	−0.04%
2022	31,762	+1.82%
Source: Instituto Nacional de Estadística y Censos; Centro Centroamericano de Población

For the 2011 census, Ipís had a population of 26,033 inhabitants.

== Transportation ==
=== Road transportation ===
The district is covered by the following road routes:

- National Route 216
- National Route 218
