= National Route 218 (Costa Rica) =

National Road Route in Costa Rica

National Secondary Route 218
- Ruta nacional secundaria 218

Route information
- Maintained by Ministry of Public Works and Transport
- Length: 32.780 km (20.369 mi)

Location
- Country: Costa Rica
- Provinces: San José, Cartago

Highway system
- National Road Network of Costa Rica
← Route 217	→ Route 219

National Secondary Route 218, or just Route 218 (Spanish: Ruta Nacional Secundaria 218, or Ruta 218) is a National Road Route of Costa Rica located in the San José and Cartago provinces.

== Description ==
In San José province the route covers San José canton (Carmen and Catedral districts) and Goicoechea canton (Guadalupe, San Francisco, Ipís, Rancho Redondo, and Purral districts).

In Cartago province the route covers Cartago canton (San Nicolás and Llano Grande districts).
