= San Antonio District, Escazú =

District in Escazú canton, San José province, Costa Rica

San Antonio
- District
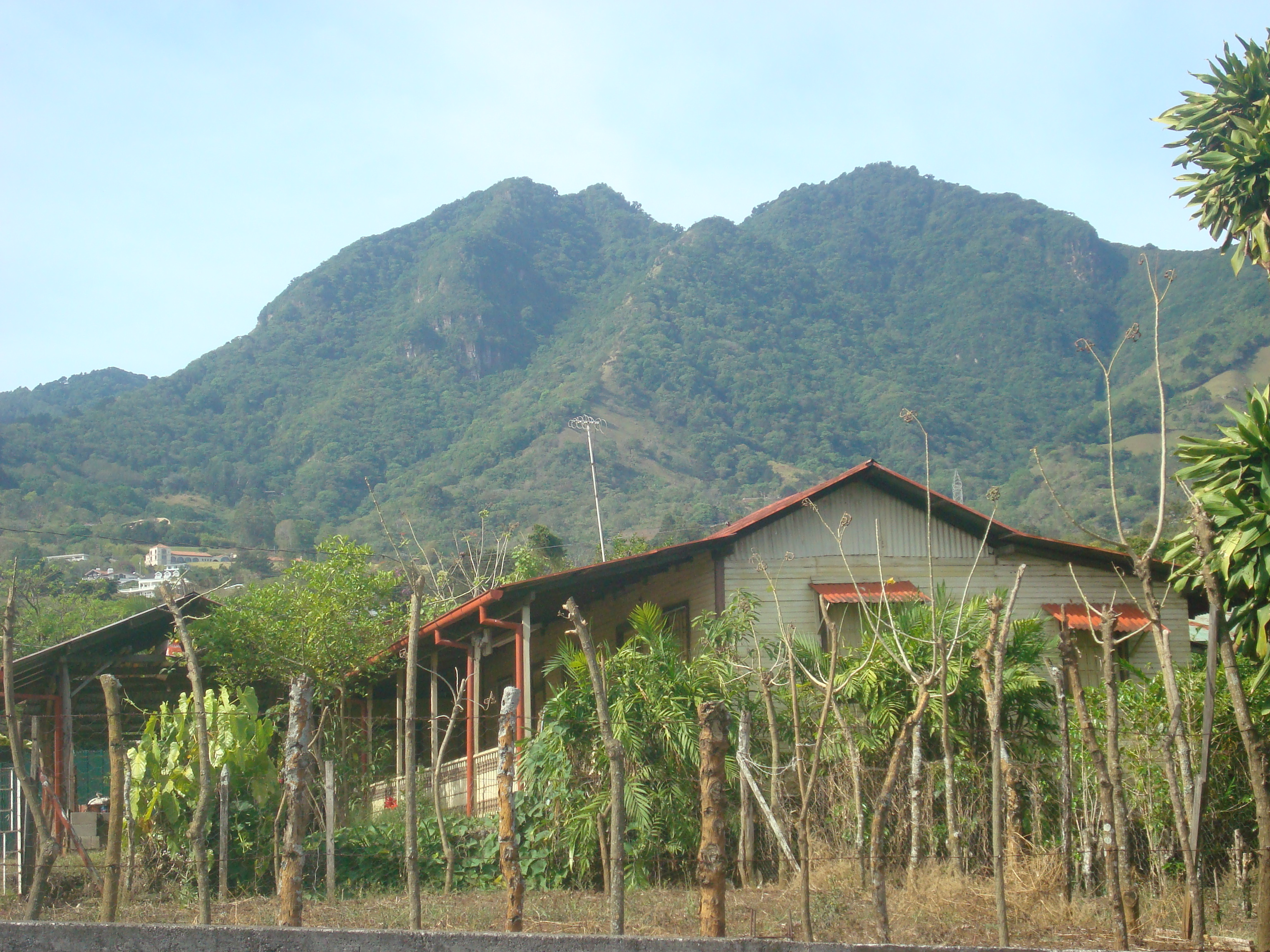
- Escazú hills seen from San Antonio
- San Antonio district
- San Antonio district location in Costa Rica
- Coordinates: 9.8906435°N 84.1416704°W
- Country: Costa Rica
- Province: San José
- Canton: Escazú

Area
  - Total: 17.01 km^{2} (6.57 sq mi)
- Elevation: 1,245 m (4,085 ft)

Population (2011)
  - Total: 22,554
  - Density: 1,326/km^{2} (3,434/sq mi)
- Time zone: UTC−06:00
- Postal code: 10202

San Antonio is a district of the Escazú canton, in the San José province of Costa Rica.

== Geography ==
San Antonio has an area of 17.01 km^{2} and an elevation of 1,245 metres.

== Demographics ==
Historical population
Census	Pop.	±% p.a.
1883	1,770	—
1892	1,498	−1.84%
1927	1,927	+0.72%
1950	2,581	+1.28%
1963	4,675	+4.68%
1973	8,405	+6.04%
1984	12,338	+3.55%
2000	20,795	+3.32%
2011	22,554	+0.74%
2022	26,549	+1.49%
Source: Instituto Nacional de Estadística y Censos; Centro Centroamericano de Población

For the 2011 census, San Antonio had a population of 22,554 inhabitants.

== Locations ==
San Antonio is one of the higher towns in the city. It has a traditional church with a square and football field in the center surrounded by the majority of its local shops and businesses.

== Transportation ==
=== Road transportation ===
The district is covered by the following road routes:

- National Route 105
