= La Sabana Metropolitan Park =

Public park in San José, Costa Rica

- Parque Metropolitano La Sabana
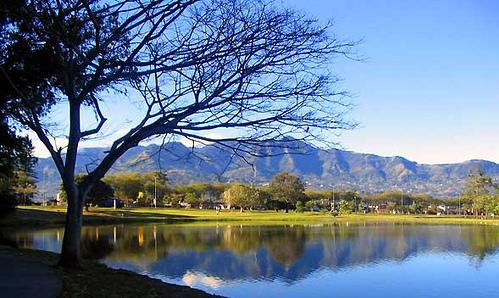
- La Sabana Metropolitan Park
- Interactive map of La Sabana Metropolitan Park
- Type: Urban park
- Location: San José, Costa Rica
- Coordinates: 9°56′08″N 84°06′15″W
- Area: 619,409.92 square metres (153.05952 acres)
- Created: 1977
- Status: Open all year

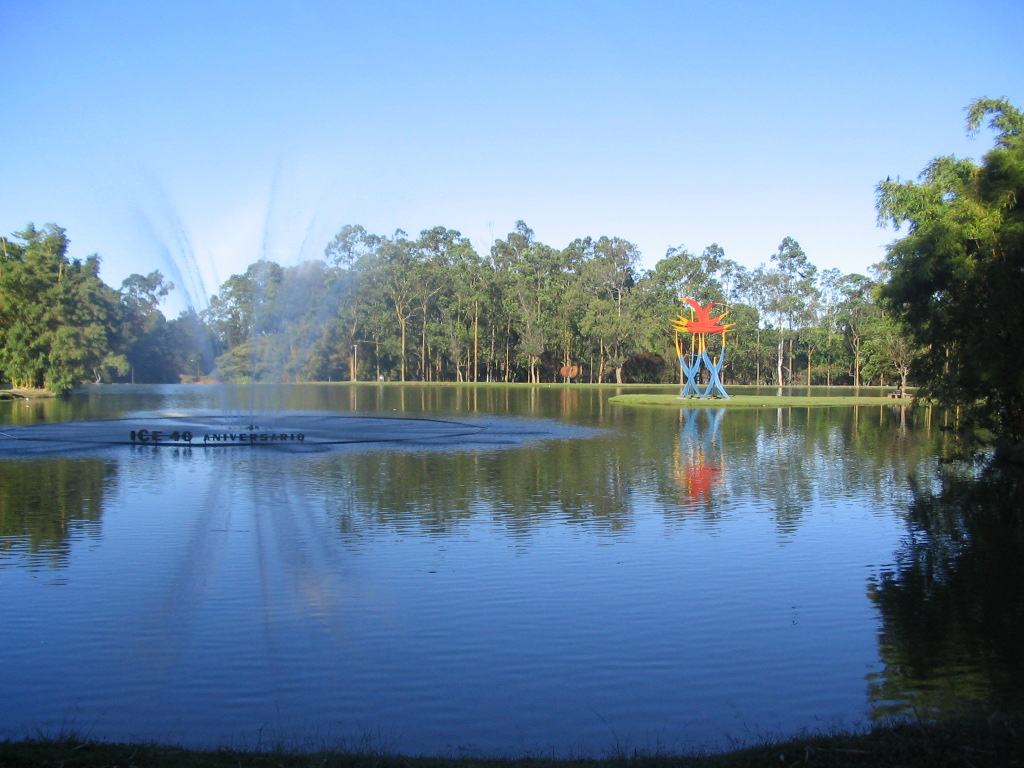
Fountain and ornamental pond, with contemporary sculpture

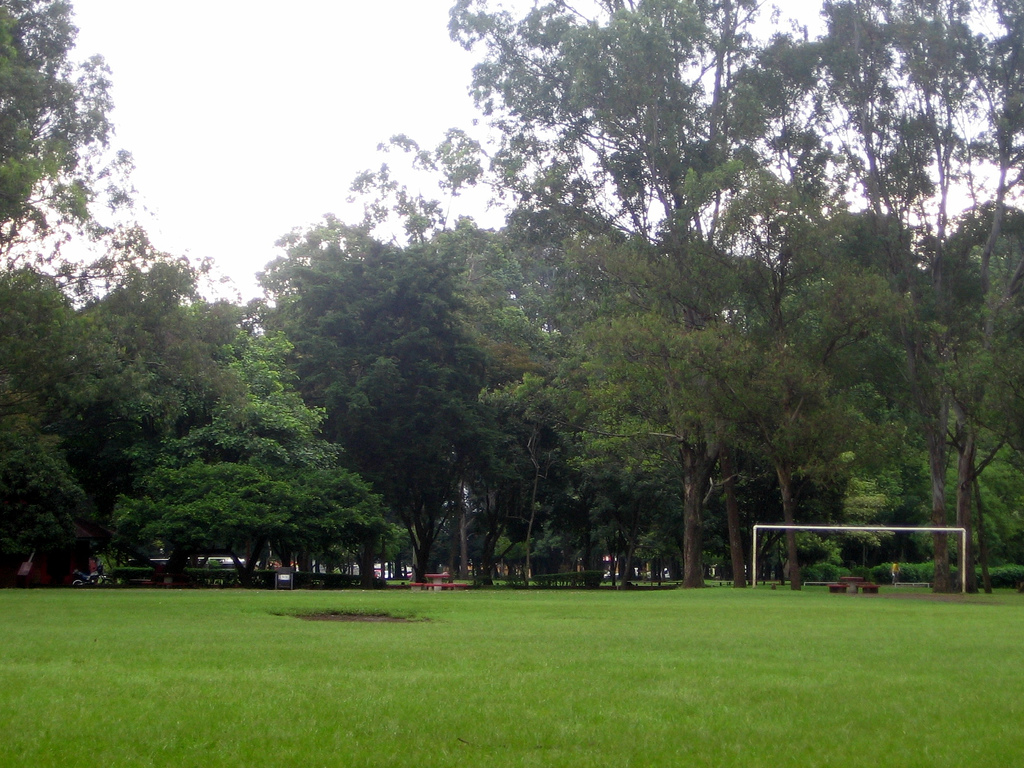
Park trees and football field

La Sabana Metropolitan Park (Spanish: Parque Metropolitano La Sabana) is located in downtown San José, Costa Rica. It is the country's largest and most significant urban park. La Sabana is considered "the lungs of San José" by Costa Ricans.

== Geography ==
Covering an area of 0.72 square kilometres (0.28 sq mi), La Sabana Metropolitan Park is adjacent to the city's core districts, offering green space and recreation to the residents of San José.

Several vital institutions and organizations are located within or adjacent to the park.

== History ==
La Sabana Metropolitan Park was officially inaugurated in 1977, though its origins last two centuries. Manuel Antonio Chapuí, the parish priest of San José at the end of the 17th century, donated several plots of land in the Mata Redonda District "to favor Costa Rica's interests". Since then, the area has been used for recreation and sports activities.

Costa Rica's first president, Juan Mora Fernández, and other josefino (San José) personalities devoted themselves to providing the park with several dispositions to preserve this green area legacy.

For more than 150 years, the park developed its characteristic vegetation, spurred by planting campaigns from the citizens. In 1930, this project was halted when the government decided to locate the country's first international airport within the park area. La Sabana International Airport was the airport serving the city until the opening of the current Juan Santamaría International Airport.

During the decade of the 1960s, the idea of turning La Sabana into San José's lungs was taken up again. With that goal, trees, shrubs, and grass were planted. In 1977, during the Daniel Oduber Administration, La Sabana was officially classified as a Metropolitan Park. In 2001 La Sabana was declared a National Architectural Heritage by an Executive Decree.

== Landmarks ==
La Sabana Metropolitan Park's most prominent buildings are the country's national stadium and the Costa Rican Museum of Art. Both are sited within the park's green space. The stadium is located above the old stadium's former location. The art museum is housed in the former main building of 'old' La Sabana Airport.

A large artificial lake, several sports fields, running and skating tracks, a gymnasium, and a shooting range are also inside its boundaries. Surrounding the park, several institutions have their main offices. These include the leading electricity company of Costa Rica, Instituto Costarricense de Electricidad, and the nation's Contraloría General de la República de Costa Rica (Comptroller General) headquarters.
