= National Route 109 (Costa Rica) =

National Road Route in Costa Rica

National Secondary Route 109
- Ruta nacional secundaria 109

Route information
- Maintained by Ministry of Public Works and Transport
- Length: 3.355 km (2.085 mi)

Location
- Country: Costa Rica
- Provinces: San José

Highway system
- National Road Network of Costa Rica
← Route 108	→ Route 110

National Secondary Route 109, or just Route 109 (Spanish: Ruta Nacional Secundaria 109, or Ruta 109) is a National Road Route of Costa Rica, located in the San José province.

== Description ==
In San José province the route covers Goicoechea canton (Calle Blancos district) and Moravia canton (San Vicente district).
