= National Route 32 (Costa Rica) =

Highway in Costa Rica

National Primary Route 32
- Ruta nacional primaria 32
- Braulio Carrillo Road (Carretera Braulio Carrillo); José Joaquín Trejos Fernández Road (Carretera José Joaquín Trejos Fernández)
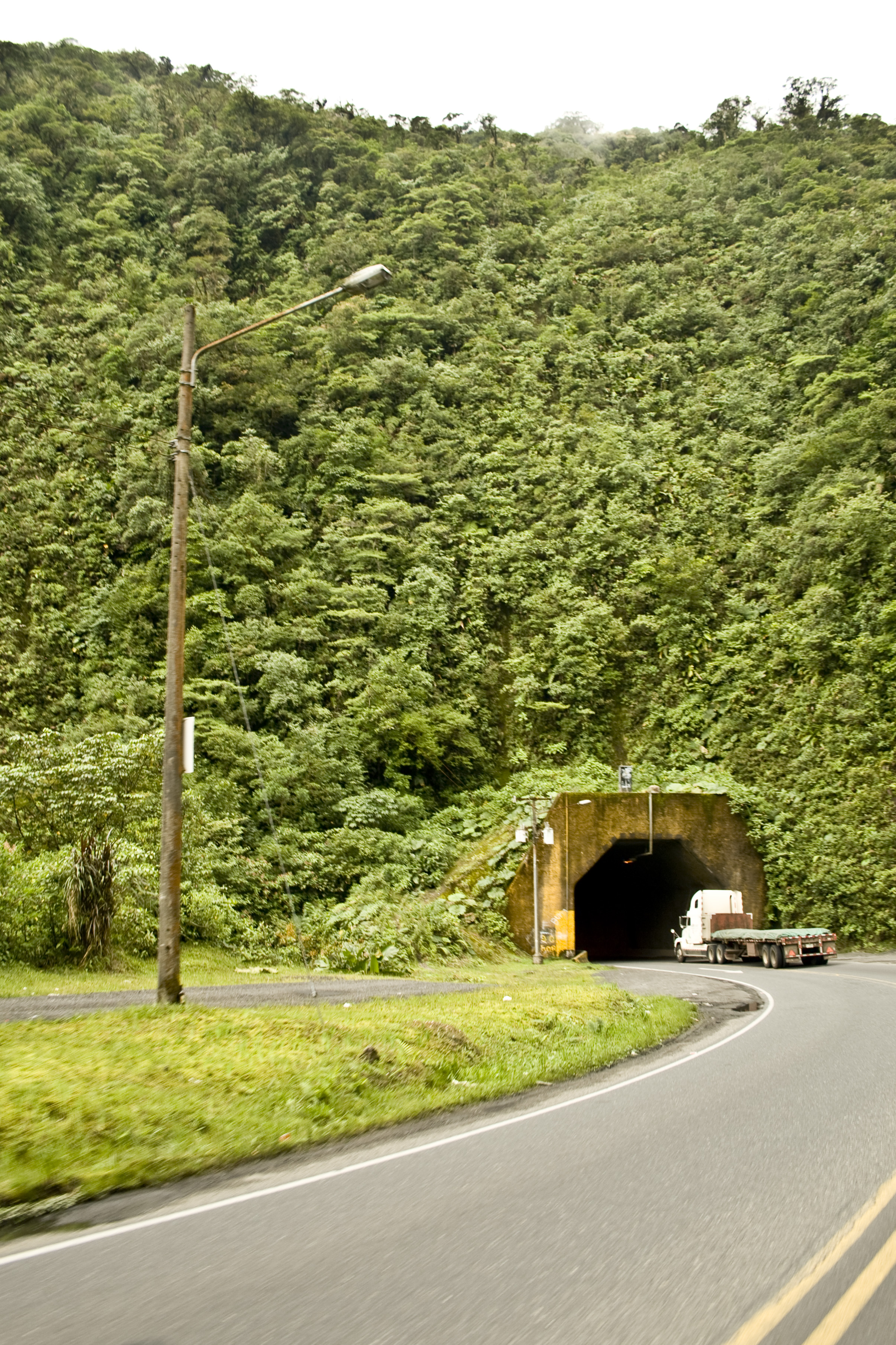
- North side of the entrance to Zurquí tunnel, located in Route 32.

Route information
- Maintained by Ministry of Public Works and Transport
- Length: 156.850 km (97.462 mi)
- Existed: 1979–present
- History: Inaugurated in March 28, 1987

Major junctions
- West end: Route 108
- Route 39 (Under construction as of 2019); Route 4 Route 10
- East end: Route 36 (Puerto Limón)

Location
- Country: Costa Rica
- Provinces: San José, Heredia, Limón

Highway system
- National Road Network of Costa Rica
← Route 27	→ Route 34

National Primary Route 32, or just Route 32 (Spanish: Ruta Nacional Primaria 32, or Ruta 32) is a National Road Route of Costa Rica, located in the San José, Heredia, Limón provinces. It connects the central valley and Greater Metropolitan Area to the Caribbean coast of the country.

== Description ==
As the main exports road of the country, through the Moín ports, 83% of the products are shipped abroad, equivalent to around 1500 trailer trucks.

The Corredor Noratlántico (North Atlantic Drive) is made from the section between Guápiles and Limón of this route, and the totality of Route 4. It allows direct travel between the Caribbean coast of the country to the northwest canton of La Cruz in Guanacaste Province.

From Route 108 in downtown San José canton, towards the Virilla river bridge there four lanes, two in each direction, then there are two lanes, one in each direction with a third ascent lane when required.

As it crosses the Braulio Carrillo National Park, there is lush greenery and vegetation as well as touristic points of interest along the road, but at the same time there is fog frequently and landslides are common through the rainy season.

There are two named sections, Braulio Carrillo Road (Spanish: Carretera Braulio Carrillo) from Tibás to Siquirres, and José Joaquín Trejos Fernández Road (Spanish: Carretera José Joaquín Trejos Fernández) from Siquirres to Limón.

=== Zurquí tunnel ===
Excavated to cross the Hondura mountain, by Kier International Limited, it has a length of 600m, 12m wide and 10m height. It is the only road tunnel in the country.

== History ==
The Carretera Braulio Carrillo (Braulio Carrillo road) was inaugurated on March 28, 1987. The initial plan or ideas were from the first half of the 19th century, by then Head of State Braulio Carrillo Colina, after whom the road is named due to these initial efforts. These plans were to use the then known as Paso de La Palma (La Palma passage), following the December trade winds coming from the Caribbean. The initial trace of the route was known as Camino de Carrillo (Carrillo's way), which goes through the cantons of Goicoechea, Moravia and Vázquez de Coronado. There were a couple of small villages of around six hundred people at Alto de La Palma and Bajo de la Hondura, supporting the road. Due to lack of economic interests, the road and villages were abandoned. The remains of Alto de La Palma Hermit and some dairy farms still exist as of 2019.

Due to the Atlantic Railroad construction, and the existing Route 126 (Sarapiquí) and Route 10 (Turrialba) roads, the project was shelved until the 1970s, when then during president Rodrigo Carazo government, the works started in 1977 on the current Route 32.

Route 32 then diminishes in 100 km the travel distance, and clears the older routes.

=== Virilla river new parallel bridge ===
A new 285m bridge started construction in March 2019 parallel to the existing bridge, as a project supervised by the United Nations Office for Project Services. The objective is to provide three new lanes over Route 32, towards San José, with the existing 1980s bridge providing two lanes in the opposing direction. Works are expected to be finished on the second semester of 2020.

This bridge is colloquially known as Puente del Saprissa (Saprissa bridge), due to its location near the Saprissa soccer team stadium.

=== Widening proposal from San José to Frío River ===
By using the private initiative works mechanism, the contractor consortium H. Solís-TPF Ingeniería has proposed to widen the road from two lanes, one in each direction, to four lanes, two in each direction, on the 45.8 kilometer segment from the Virilla River bridge to the Frío River.

Still in the design stage, the proposal includes several alternatives according to the terrain to this work, including:

- Fake tunnels over the existing road, to avoid landslides in exposed areas.
- Two level highways, with the top segment moving in one direction, and lower level in the opposite direction.
- Bridges over canyons next to the existing road.
- Elevated or lower adjacent levels to the existing road.

A new tunnel next to the Zurquí tunnel would be required.

=== Guápiles to Puerto Limón widening ===
A widening project of 107 km from two lanes to four lanes, two in each direction, starting at the junction with Route 4 at Frío river to Puerto Limón district center, was awarded to China Harbour Engineering Company (CHEC) in November 2017, with works starting in April 2018, and plans to deliver the widened road in the latter half of 2021.

However, due to delays from expropriations, lack of tree cutting environmental plans and of designs at the start date, required utilities pipelines relocation, archaeological studies at five locations, and also cultural and language barriers, the finish date has been moved many times.

Among the works, nine of the thirty two existing bridges will be completely rebuilt, thirteen new interchanges, twenty four pedestrian bridges and five junctions at Frío river, Guápiles, Siquirres, Moín and with Route 257 that links with APM Moín Container Terminal (TCM).
