= FC Moravia FCM =

Costa Rican association football club

- Full name: FC Moravia FCM
- Founded: 3 May 2017; 9 years ago
- Ground: Estadio Jorge Cuty Monge
- Owner: Mónica Malavassi
- Chairman: Mónica Malavassi
- Manager: Yunielys Castillo
- League: Liga de Ascenso

FC Moravia FCM is a Costa Rican football team that plays in the Liga de Ascenso, the second national category.

== History ==
It was founded on May 3, 2017 in the canton of Moravia in the province of San José, under the official name of FC Moravia FCM, after businessman José Luis Rodríguez acquired the franchise of Jacó Rays Fútbol Club, once this last team could not cope with the financial problems it had since 2014.

In its beginnings, the club was considered a kind of successor to the Moravian Sports Union, since the canton went for several years without having a soccer club in the second category, despite having a stadium that meets the minimum requirements. necessary. Previously, the structure of Fútbol Consultants existed as a team of minor divisions and women's category.

The first coach of the club is former soccer player Robert Arias and they debuted in the 2017 Opening Tournament.

In September 2018, once the Opening Tournament of the Second Division of that year began, the franchise moved to the canton of Desamparados, due to the lack of logistical support from the Municipality of Moravia and sponsors from that community, added to the scarce fans and the poor conditions of the "Pipilo" Umaña stadium.

From then on, and thanks to the agreement signed between the president of the team and the mayor of the canton at that time, the club was renamed FC Moravia FCM, and its home venue is the Jorge Hernán "Cuty" Monge stadium. included the change of colors in the shield and in the uniform (instead of red, it is blue).

== Stadium ==
Its home venue is the Stadium Ernesto Rohrmoser, located in Pavas.

== Current squad ==
Note: Flags indicate national team as defined under FIFA eligibility rules; some limited exceptions apply. Players may hold more than one non-FIFA nationality.

No.	Pos.	Nation	Player
-	GK	CUB	Yordy Hodelin
-	GK	CRC	Justin Morera
-	GK	CRC	Julián Figueroa
-	DF	CRC	Alvin Bennett
-	DF	CRC	Dario Delgado
-	DF	ECU	Jackson Plaza
-	DF	CUB	Elvis Casanova
-	DF	CRC	Lemark Hernández
-	DF	CRC	Ian Badilla
-	DF	CRC	Jordin Urbina
-	DF	CRC	Rutsell Mora
-	DF	CRC	Alejandro Fonseca
-	DF	CRC	Matteo Canella

No.	Pos.	Nation	Player
-	MF	CRC	Marcos Campos
-	MF	CRC	Kevin Ortiz
-	MF	CRC	Tristan Drummond
-	MF	CUB	Pedro Bravo
-	MF	CRC	Esteban Rodríguez
-	MF	CRC	Diego Madrigal
-	FW	PAN	Daniel Petit
-	FW	CRC	Joshua Parra
-	FW	CRC	Pablo Abarca
-	FW	CRC	Ricardo Espinoza
-	FW	COL	Rylen Kennedy-Ochoa

== List of coaches ==
- (Costa Rica) Robert Arias (2017–2018)
- (Costa Rica) Ricardo Arguedas (2018)
- (Argentina) Hugo Viegas (2018–2019)
- (Costa Rica) Marvin Solano (2019)
- (Costa Rica) Minor Díaz (2019–2020)
- (Costa Rica) Edson Soto (2020–2022)
- (Argentina) Cristian Salomón (2023)
- (Costa Rica) Walter Centeno (2023–2024)
- (Costa Rica) Luis Fernando Fallas (2024)
- (Costa Rica) Luis Carlos Arias (2024)
- (Colombia) Mateo Silva (2024)
- (Costa Rica) Robert Arias (2024)
- (Cuba) Yunielys Castillo (2025)
- (Costa Rica) Luis Fernando Fallas (2025)

== Honours ==
Type	Competition	Titles	Champions	Runners-up
Domestic	Segunda División de Costa Rica	1	CL-2025	2024-25
