= San Rafael District, Escazú =

District in Escazú canton, San José province, Costa Rica

San Rafael
- District
- San Rafael district
- San Rafael district location in Costa Rica
- Coordinates: 9.9448051°N 84.1532395°W
- Country: Costa Rica
- Province: San José
- Canton: Escazú

Area
  - Total: 12.96 km^{2} (5.00 sq mi)
- Elevation: 1,042 m (3,419 ft)

Population (2011)
  - Total: 21,971
  - Density: 1,695/km^{2} (4,391/sq mi)
- Time zone: UTC−06:00
- Postal code: 10203

San Rafael is a district of the Escazú canton, in the San José province of Costa Rica.

== Geography ==
San Rafael has an area of 12.96 km^{2} and an elevation of 1,042 metres.

== Demographics ==
Historical population
Census	Pop.	±% p.a.
1883	1,496	—
1892	1,705	+1.46%
1927	1,043	−1.39%
1950	1,529	+1.68%
1963	3,393	+6.32%
1973	6,763	+7.14%
1984	10,258	+3.86%
2000	19,198	+3.99%
2011	21,971	+1.23%
2022	32,361	+3.58%
Source: Instituto Nacional de Estadística y Censos; Centro Centroamericano de Población

For the 2011 census, San Rafael had a population of 21,971 inhabitants.

== Transportation ==
=== Road transportation ===
The district is covered by the following road routes:

- National Route 27
- National Route 105
- National Route 121
- National Route 167
- National Route 177
- National Route 310
