= Alajuelita (canton) =

Canton in San José province, Costa Rica

- Canton
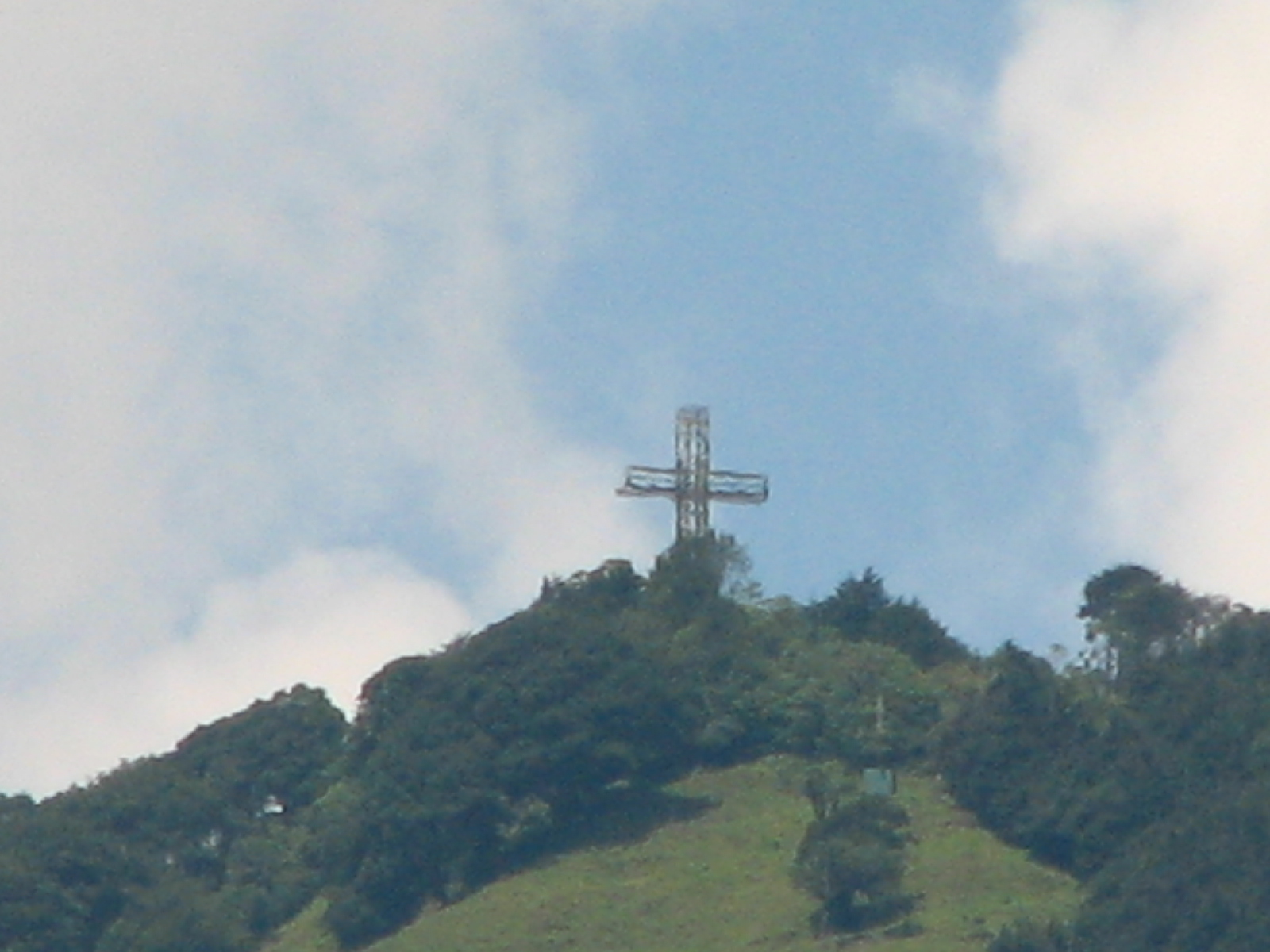
- Alajuelita Cross, was illuminated and visible from most of the Central Valley

- Flag Seal
- Interactive map of Alajuelita
- Alajuelita canton location in San José Province Alajuelita canton location in Costa Rica
- Coordinates: 9.8890038°N 84.1151684°W
- Country: Costa Rica
- Province: San José
- Creation: 4 June 1909
- Head city: Alajuelita
- Districts: Districts: Alajuelita; San Josecito; San Antonio; Concepción; San Felipe

Government
  - Type: Municipality
  - Body: Municipalidad de Alajuelita
  - Mayor: María del Rosario Siles Fernández (Note: Also legally named María del Rocío Siles Fernández.) (PNG)

Area
  - Total: 21.47 km^{2} (8.29 sq mi)
- Elevation: 1,194 m (3,917 ft)

Population (2011)
  - Total: 77,603
  - Estimate (2022): 81,012
  - Density: 3,614/km^{2} (9,361/sq mi)
- Time zone: UTC−06:00
- Canton code: 110
- Website: munialajuelita.go.cr

Alajuelita is a canton in the San José province of Costa Rica.

== History ==
Alajuelita was created on 4 June 1909 by decree 58. The first settlements in the area occurred by 1650. The name "Alajuelita" comes from a diminutive form of the name of Alajuela Province due to original settlers coming from that province.

== Geography ==
Alajuelita has an area of 21.47 km^{2} (8.29 sq mi) and a mean elevation of 1,194 m (3,917 ft).

The odd-shaped canton reaches southwest from the suburbs of the national capital city of San José. It is delineated by the Tiribí River on the northeast, Cañas River on the east, Poás River on the southeast, and the Cerros de Escazú at it far southwestern end. The Santuario Nacional Santo Cristo de Esquipulas is located in this canton along with the San Miguel Hill, whose metallic cross built at its peak is definitely one of the more beloved landmarks in Costa Rican Central Region.

== Government ==
=== Mayor ===
According to Costa Rica's Municipal Code, mayors are elected every four years by the population of the canton. As of the latest municipal elections in 2024, the New Generation Party candidate, María del Rosario Siles Fernández, was elected mayor of the canton with 47.78% of the votes, with Jonathan Miguel Arrieta Ulloa and Javiera Tatiana Centeno Barboza as first and second vice mayors, respectively.

Mayors of Alajuelita since the 2002 elections
Period	Name	Party
2002–2006	Víctor Hugo Echavarría Ureña (Note: Also legally named Víctor Hugo Chavarría Ureña.)	PUSC
2006–2010	Tómas Poblador Soto	PLN
2010–2016	Víctor Hugo Echavarría Ureña	PUSC
2016–2020	Modesto Alpizar Luna	PNG
2020–2024	Modesto Alpizar Luna	PNG
2024–2028	María del Rosario Siles Fernández	PNG

=== Municipal Council ===
Like the mayor and vice mayors, members of the Municipal Council (called regidores) are elected every four years. Alajuelita's Municipal Council has 7 seats for regidores and their substitutes, who can participate in meetings but not vote unless the owning regidor (regidor propietario) is absent. The current president of the Municipal Council is the Social Christian Unity Party member Henry David Salazar Quesada, with New Generation Party member Grettel Andrea Murillo Quirós as vice president. The Municipal Council's composition for the 2024–2028 period is as follows:

Current composition of the Municipal Council of Alajuelita after the 2024 municipal elections
Political parties in the Municipal Council of Alajuelita
Political party	Regidores		
Political party	№	Owner	Substitute
New Generation Party (PNG)	3	Laura Alicia Araúz Tenorio	Rosibel Calderón Chinchilla
New Generation Party (PNG)	3	José Alix Reyes Gómex (Note: Also legally named José Alex Reyes Gómez.)	Hector Alonso Hidalgo Sánchez
New Generation Party (PNG)	3	Grettel Andrea Murillo Quirós^{(VP)}	Flor Zúñiga Rodríguez
Social Christian Unity Party (PUSC)	2	Henry David Salazar Quesada^{(P)}	Luis Fernando Chinchilla Retana
Social Christian Unity Party (PUSC)	2	Patricia Mayela Guido Chinchilla	Katherine Marcela Mora Bonilla
National Liberation Party (PLN)	1	Leyda María Badilla Sánchez	Carolina Mora Sibaja
Our Town Party (PNP)	1	José Alberto Páez Zúñiga	Esteban Emilio Chavarría Villalta

== Districts ==
The canton of Alajuelita is subdivided into the following districts:

1. Alajuelita
2. San Josecito
3. San Antonio
4. Concepción
5. San Felipe

== Demographics ==
Historical population
Census	Pop.	±% p.a.
1927	2,571	—
1950	3,920	+1.85%
1963	10,848	+8.14%
1973	23,013	+7.81%
1984	31,390	+2.86%
2000	70,297	+5.17%
2011	77,603	+0.90%
2022	81,012	+0.39%
Source: Instituto Nacional de Estadística y Censos; Centro Centroamericano de Población

Alajuelita had an estimated population of 81,012 people in 2022, up from 77,603 at the time of the 2011 census.

In 2022, Alajuelita had a Human Development Index of 0.712.

== Education ==
- Escuela San Felipe, founded 1966

== Transportation ==
=== Road transportation ===
The canton is covered by the following road routes:

- National Route 105
- National Route 110
- National Route 177
- National Route 217
