= National Route 108 (Costa Rica) =

National Road Route in Costa Rica

National Secondary Route 108
- Ruta nacional secundaria 108

Route information
- Maintained by Ministry of Public Works and Transport
- Length: 5.975 km (3.713 mi)

Location
- Country: Costa Rica
- Provinces: San José

Highway system
- National Road Network of Costa Rica
← Route 107	→ Route 109

National Secondary Route 108, or just Route 108 (Spanish: Ruta Nacional Secundaria 108, or Ruta 108) is a National Road Route of Costa Rica, located in the San José province.

== Description ==
In San José province the route covers San José canton (Merced, Uruca districts), Goicoechea canton (Guadalupe, San Francisco districts), and Tibás canton (Cinco Esquinas district).
