= Escazú (canton) =

Canton in San José province, Costa Rica

- Canton
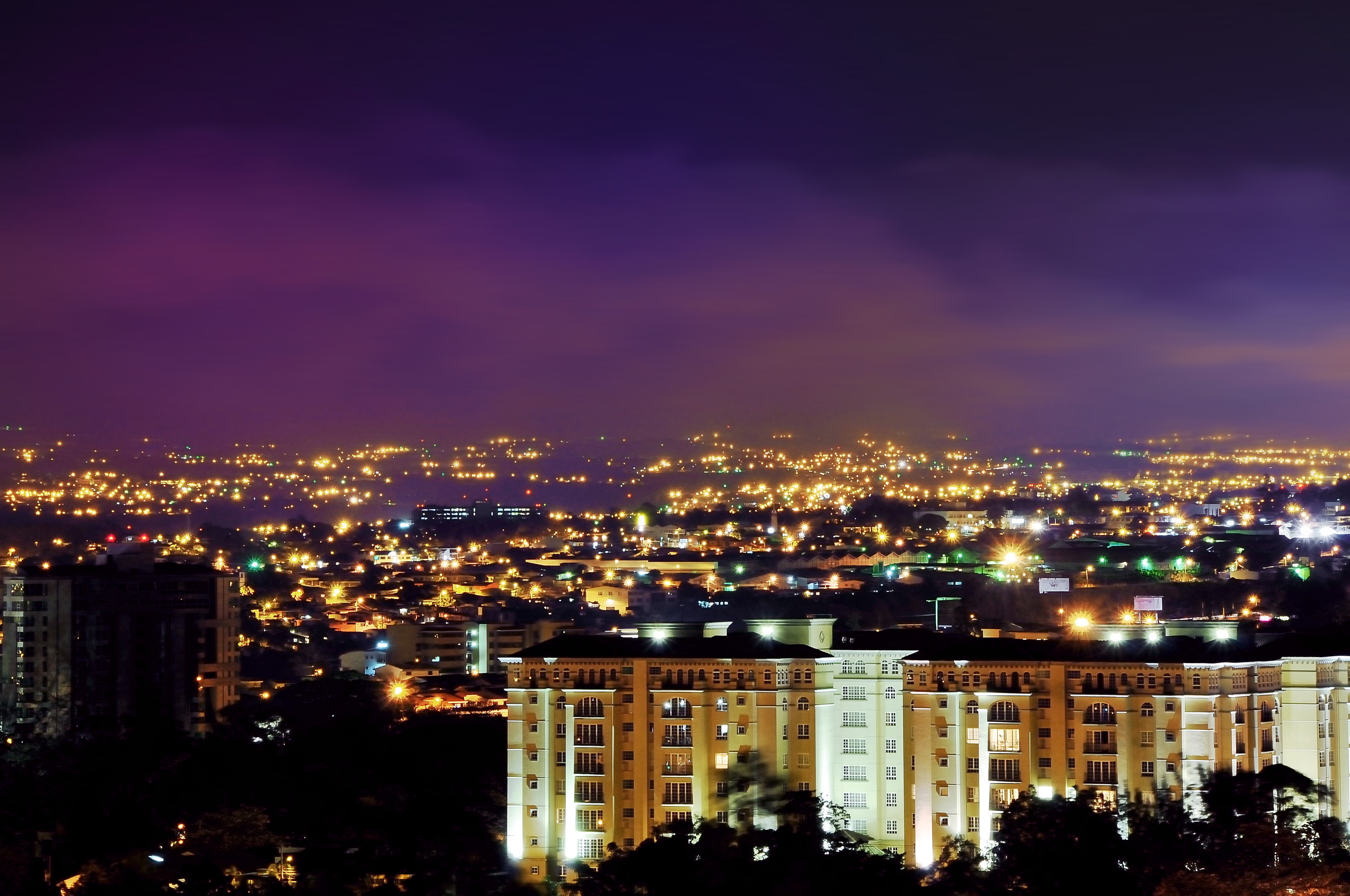
- Escazú at night.

- Flag Seal
- Interactive map of Escazú
- Escazú canton location in San José Province Escazú canton location in Costa Rica
- Coordinates: 9.9167075°N 84.1532395°W
- Country: Costa Rica
- Province: San José
- Creation: December 7, 1848
- Head city: Escazú
- Districts: Districts: Escazú; San Antonio; San Rafael

Government
  - Type: Municipality
  - Body: Municipalidad de Escazú
  - Mayor: Orlando Esteban Umaña Umaña (PNG)

Area
  - Total: 34.53 km^{2} (13.33 sq mi)
- Elevation: 1,129 m (3,704 ft)

Population (2011)
  - Total: 56,509
  - Estimate (2022): 71,500
  - Density: 1,637/km^{2} (4,239/sq mi)
- Time zone: UTC−06:00
- Canton code: 102
- Website: www.escazu.go.cr

Escazú is the second canton in the province of San José in Costa Rica.

The canton lies west of the San José Canton, and its whole territory is part of the Greater Metropolitan Area.

The canton was one of the country's earliest, established on December 7, 1848. As the metropolitan area has expanded Escazú has become a suburban area on the west side of the national capital city of San José. It is delineated by the Río Tiribí on its northern border. The peak of Cerro Cedral in the Cerros de Escazú marks the southern limit of the canton.

== Toponymy ==
The name "Escazú" derives from the indigenous word "Izt-kat-zu", which means "resting stone". The story tells of Indians traveling from Aserrí (south of San José) to Pacaca (near Ciudad Colón), who used to stop and rest at this location, which was about halfway between the two villages.

== History ==
Escazú was first mentioned as a canton in a decree dated December 7, 1848.

The first inhabitants were natives from the Guetaras or Huaca tribes. By 1755, villagers were ordered out of Escazú and moved to San José by force. From 1796 to 1799, the church of San Miguel was built with the cooperation of the people who had already been re-established at this site. By 1801, the population of Escazú reached 1,325. On May 28, 1920, the government of Costa Rica granted Escazú the status of City, head of the Canton (County) of Escazú.

Popular legend tags Escazú as La Ciudad de las Brujas (the City of the Witches), leading to its municipal seal, a depiction of a witch on a broomstick flying over the surrounding mountains. It has been suggested that this reputation stems from the perception of Crypto-Jewish traditions since a large number of Conversos were known to have settled in the area.

== Landmarks ==
Local landmarks in the canton include the Costa Rica Country Club, the Multiplaza Mall, and, more recently, Avenida Escazú. These new complexes hold some of the world's most luxurious brands in Multiplaza Mall. Escazú is also home to several diplomatic missions, including the residence of the Ambassador from the United States.

== Geography ==
Escazú has an area of 34.53 km^{2} (13.33 sq mi) and a mean elevation of 1,129 m (3,704 ft).

== Government ==
=== Mayor ===
According to Costa Rica's Municipal Code, mayors are elected every four years by the population of the canton. As of the latest municipal elections in 2024, the New Generation Party candidate, Orlando Esteban Umaña Umaña, was elected mayor of the canton with 30.28% of the votes, with Ligia Hernández Rojas and Sylvia Alpizar Antillón as first and second vice mayors, respectively.

Mayors of Escazú since the 2002 elections
Period	Name	Party
2002–2006	Marco Antonio Segura Seco	PLN
2006–2010	Marco Antonio Segura Seco	PLN
2010–2016	Arnoldo Valentín Barahona Cortés	YUNTA
2016–2020	Arnoldo Valentín Barahona Cortés	YUNTA
2020–2024	Arnoldo Valentín Barahona Cortés	PNG
2024–2028	Orlando Esteban Umaña Umaña	PNG

=== Municipal Council ===
Like the mayor and vice mayors, members of the Municipal Council (called regidores) are elected every four years. Escazú's Municipal Council has 7 seats for regidores and their substitutes, who can participate in meetings but not vote unless the owning regidor (regidor propietario) is absent. The current president of the Municipal Council is the Terra Escazú regidor Mario Arce Guillén, with National Liberation Party member Silvia Quesada Marcela Zamora as vice president. The Municipal Council's composition for the 2024–2028 period is as follows:

Current composition of the Municipal Council of Escazú after the 2024 municipal elections
Political parties in the Municipal Council of Escazú
Political party	Regidores		
Political party	№	Owner	Substitute
New Generation Party (PNG)	2	José Campos Quesada	Geovanni Andrés Vargas Delgado
New Generation Party (PNG)	2	Sigrid Miller Esquivel	Ana María Barrenechea Soto
United We Can (UP)	1	Laura Fonseca Herrera	Seydi Vargas Rojas
United for Escazú (UPES)	1	Ricardo López Granados	James Eduardo Chacón Castro
Terra Escazú (TE)	1	Mario Arce Guillén^{(P)}	Manuel Flores Fernández
Escazú's Progressive Yoke (YUNTA)	1	Adriana Solís Araya	Doris Mayela Agüero Córdoba
National Liberation Party (PLN)	1	Silvia Marcela Quesada Zamora^{(VP)}	Silvia María Castro Mendoza

== Districts ==
The canton of Escazú is subdivided into three districts:

- Escazú
- San Antonio
- San Rafael

== Demographics ==
Historical population
Census	Pop.	±% p.a.
1864	8,760	—
1883	5,550	−2.37%
1892	6,522	+1.81%
1927	5,113	−0.69%
1950	7,141	+1.46%
1963	14,250	+5.46%
1973	25,026	+5.79%
1984	33,101	+2.57%
2000	52,372	+2.91%
2011	56,509	+0.69%
2022	71,500	+2.16%
Source: Instituto Nacional de Estadística y Censos; Centro Centroamericano de Población

Escazú had an estimated 71,500 residents in 2022, up from 56,509 for the 2011 census.

The canton's urban areas are home to 79.8% of its population. Children under ten account for 17.88% of the population, while 6.05% are over 65.

According to a publication by the United Nations Development Programme, Escazú ranked as the 2nd highest canton in Costa Rica regarding human development in 2022, with a score of 0.867, only behind Santa Ana.

== Transportation ==
=== Road transportation ===
The following road routes cover the canton:

- National Route 27
- National Route 105
- National Route 121
- National Route 167
- National Route 177
- National Route 310
