= List of museums in Costa Rica =

This is a list of museums in Costa Rica.

Most of the wide selection of museums in Costa Rica are in the Central Valley, especially in the capital city of San José.

== List of museums ==
=== San José ===
- Centro Costarricense de la Ciencia y la Cultura
  - Museo de los Niños (The Children's Museum)
- Museo de Arte y Diseño Contemporáneo (Museum of Contemporary Art and Design)
- Museo de Formas Espacios y Sonidos (Shapes, Spaces, and Sounds Museum)
- Museo de Oro Precolombiano (The Museum of Pre-Columbian Gold)
- Museo del Jade (Museum of Jade)
- Museo Filatélico y Numismático de Costa Rica (Philatelic and Numismatic Museum)
- Museo Nacional de Costa Rica (The National Museum)
- Museo d'arte contemporanea italiana in America (Museum of Italian Contemporary Art in America)
- Museo de Arte Costarricense (Costa Rican Museum of Art)
- Museo de Criminología (Criminology Museum)
- Museo de Insectos de la Universidad de Costa Rica (MIUCR) (Museum of Insects at The University of Costa Rica)
- Museo de Numismática (Costa Rica) (Numismatic Museum)
- Museo de Zoología - Escuela de Biología (Zoology Museum), University of Costa Rica
- Museo del Colegio Superior de Señoritas (Women's Education and History Museum), Colegio Superior de Señoritas
- Museo Dr. Rafael Ángel Calderón Guardia (Historical Museum)
- Museo Joaquín García Monge (Historical Museum)
- Museo Histórico Tecnológico Grupo ICE (Historical Technology Museum)
- Museo La Salle (La Salle Natural Sciences Museum)
- Museo para la Paz

=== Alajuela Province ===
- Museo Histórico Cultural Juan Santamaría, Alajuela
- Museo Regional de San Ramón, San Ramón

=== Cartago Province ===
- Basilica of Our Lady of the Angels, Cartago
- Museo de Arte Religioso de San José de Orosi, at the Iglesia de Orosi (Orosí Church & Religious Museum), Orosi

=== Guanacaste Province ===
- Museo de Sabanero, Liberia
- Museo de Guanacaste, Liberia

=== Heredia Province ===
- Museo de Cultura Popular (Popular Culture, or Folklore, Museum), Barva
- Museo de Culturas Indígenas Dra. María Eugenia Bozzoli, named in honor of Maria Eugenia Bozzoli, Puerto Viejo, Sarapiquí

== See also ==
- List of museums
- Culture of Costa Rica
- Tourism in Costa Rica
