= Plaza de la Democracia =

Public square in San José, Costa Rica

Coordinates: 9.93278°N 84.07218°W

The Plaza de la Democracia, officially Plaza de la Democracia y de la Abolición del Ejército (English: "Plaza of Democracy and the Abolition of the Military") is a public plaza located in San José, Costa Rica, the national capital of Costa Rica. The plaza is located directly in front of the national congress building, which houses the Legislative Assembly of Costa Rica, and is flanked by the Museo Nacional de Costa Rica and the Museo del Jade.

== History ==
The plaza was inaugurated in 1989, to commemorate the centennial of former president Bernardo Soto Alfaro's decision to withdraw from power rather than violently contesting his loss to José Joaquín Rodríguez Zeledón in the 1889 election. It was given its longer name in 2016, as the plaza was also the site of the abolition of the Costa Rican military in 1948.
