= Bahia Salinas =

Bahia Salinas is a resort location in Guanacaste province, Costa Rica, by the Pacific Ocean. The closest international airport is at Liberia, about a one-hour drive away.

Playa Copal is the most popular kitesurfing beach. Papaturro beach is also good for kiting; they are both sandy, with shallow water. Thanks to a tiny island and an outcropping of land, the water is flat even when it is windy. The wind direction is side on shore, which is the best to practice this sport.

The wind starts when the rainy season finishes in November and it can last until June. The wind is fairly strong (20-40 knots) so the best kite sizes are 7m or 8m. The water is warm, and wetsuits are not needed. Other available activities include horseback riding, trekking, and fishing.
