= Museo del Jade =

Archaeological museum in San José, Costa Rica

- Jade Museum

- The museum building
- Established: 1977
- Location: San José, Costa Rica
- Coordinates: 9°56′11″N 84°04′25″W
- Type: archaeological museum
- Founder: Fidel Tristán Castro
- Website: Official website

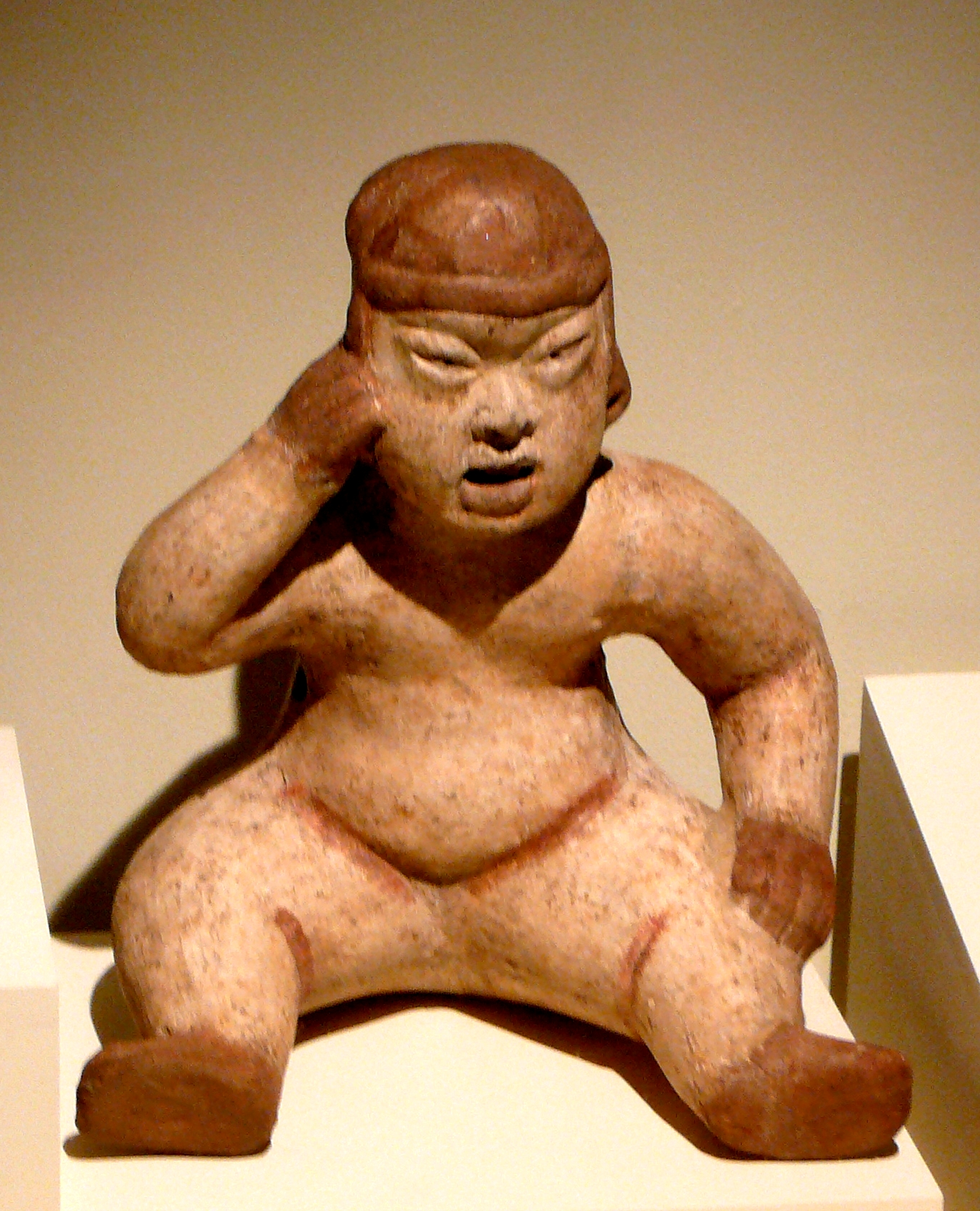
An Olmec baby-face figurine from the Museo Nacional del Jade

The Museo del Jade is an archaeological museum in San José, Costa Rica. Since 2014, it has been located in front of Plaza de la Democracia. It was founded in 1977 by Fidel Tristán Castro, the first president of the INS. The museum contains the world's largest collection of American jade.

== Gallery ==
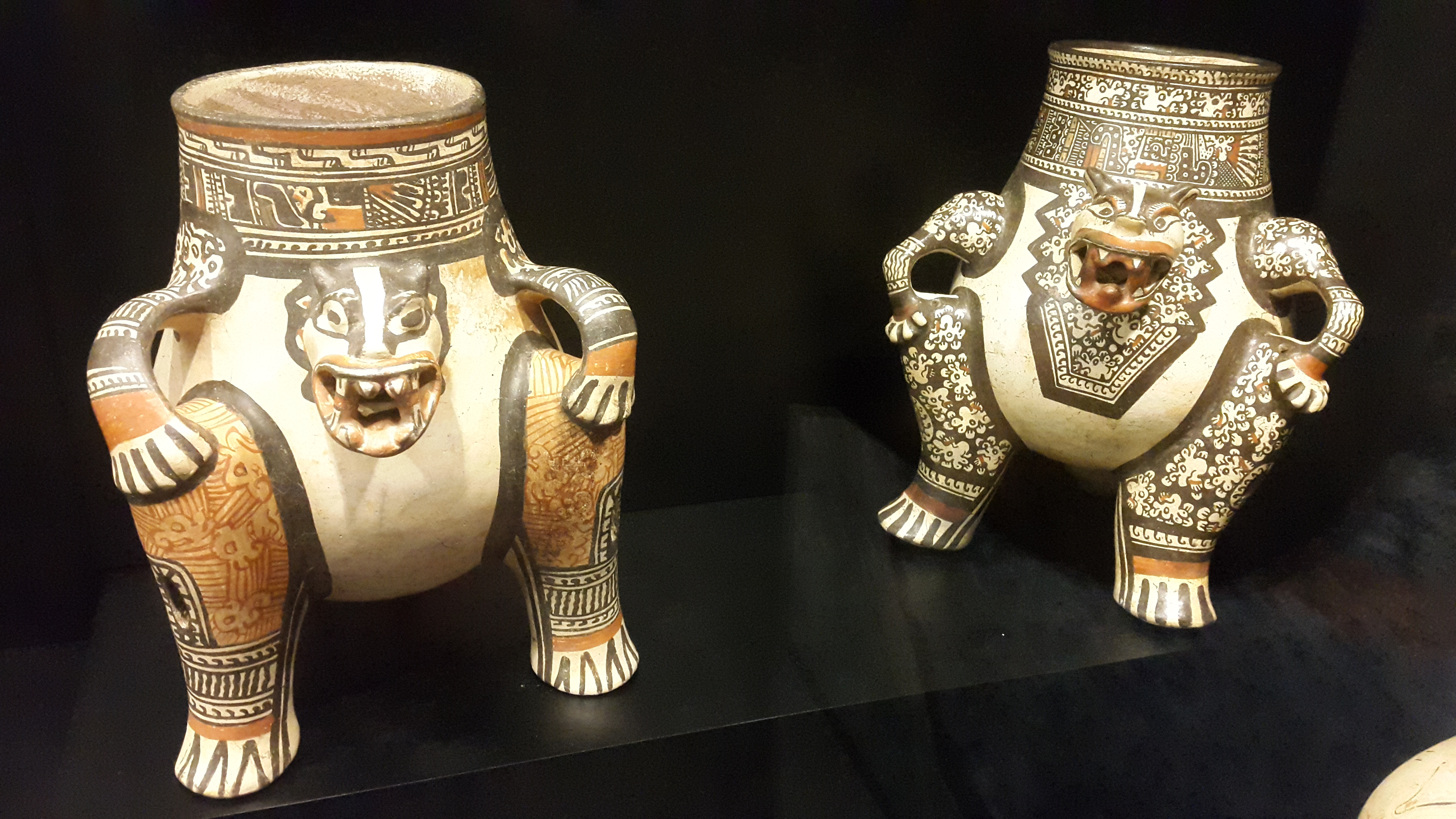
Ceramic tripod pots with jaguar motifs

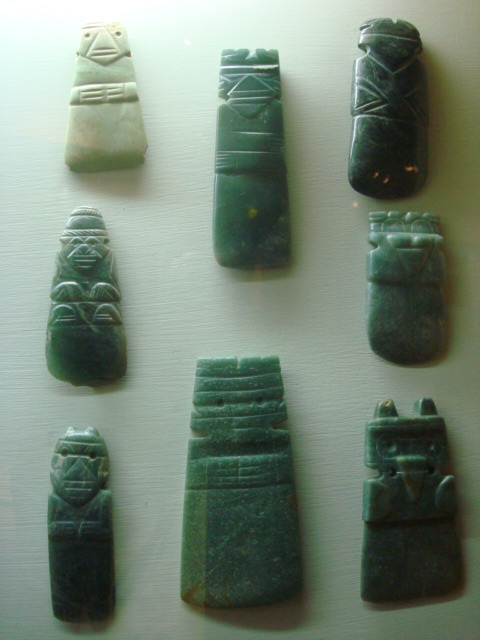
Jade artifacts from Nicoya

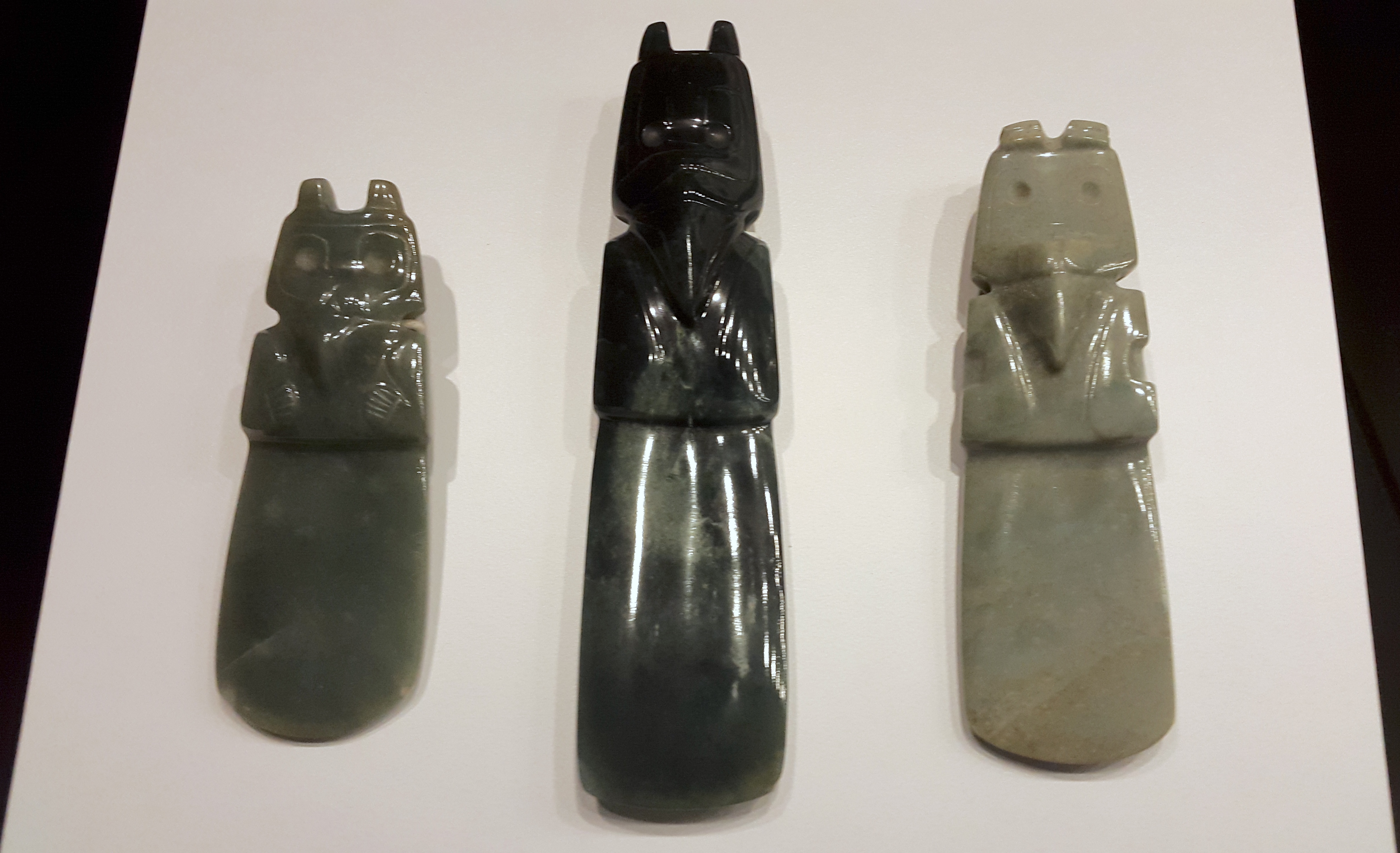
Jade artifacts with avian features

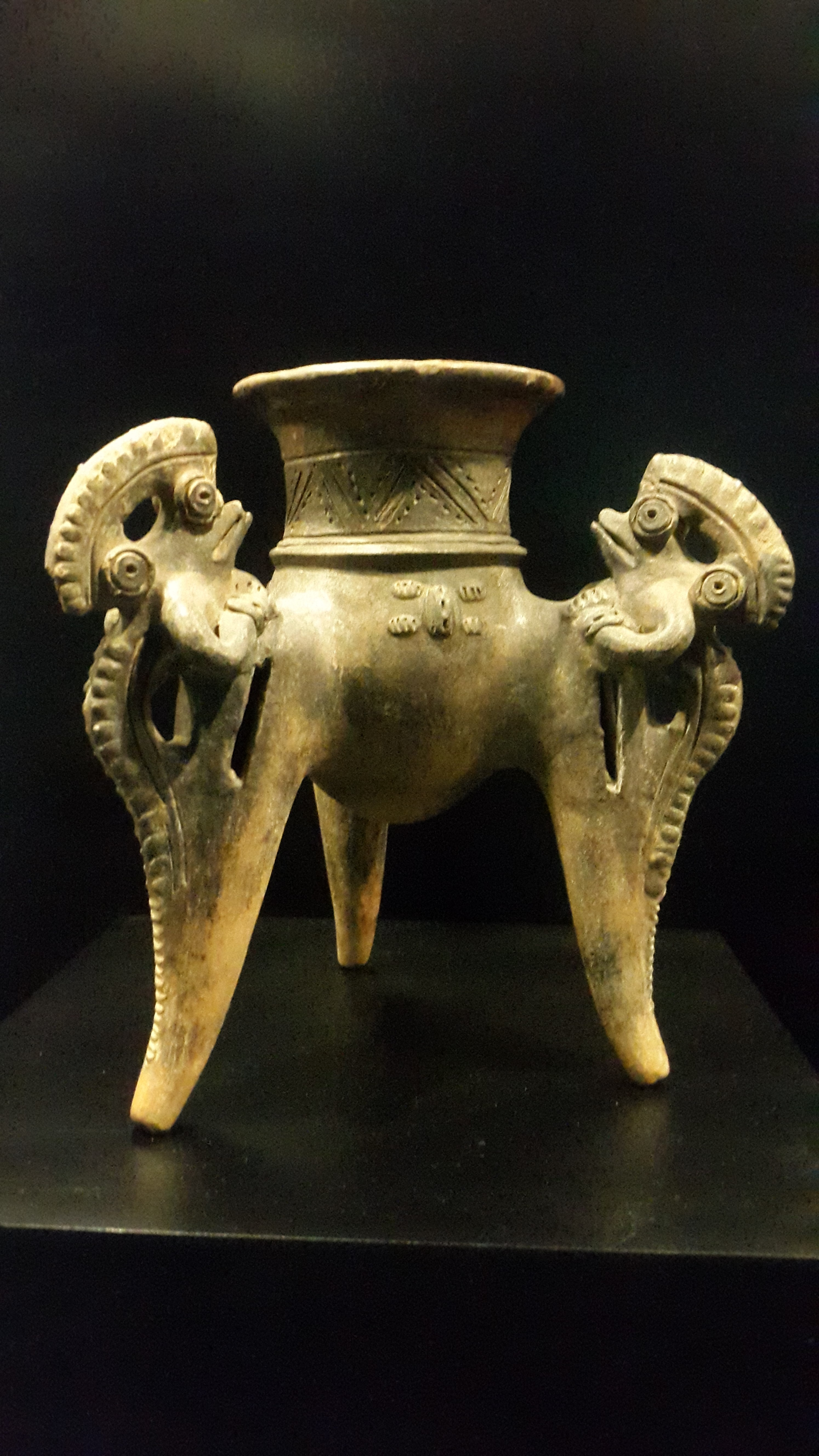
Tripod vessel

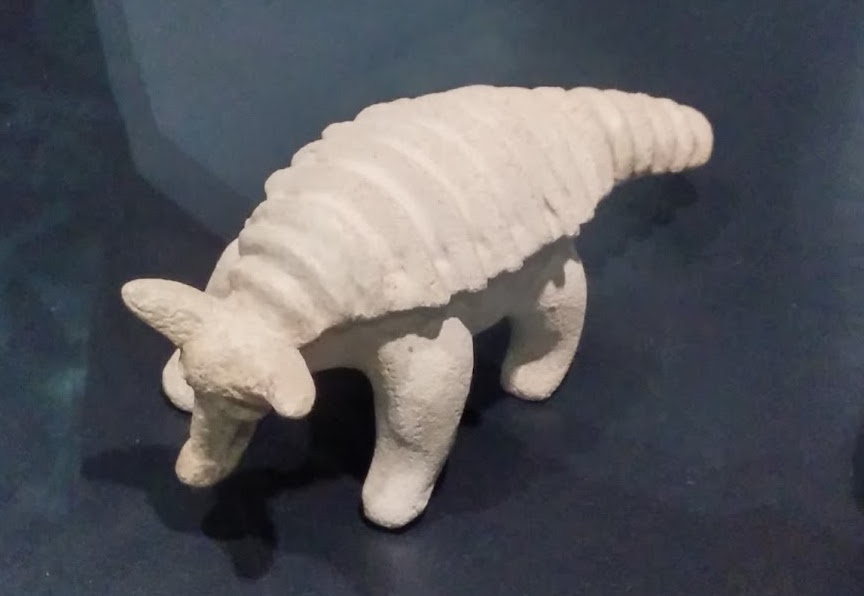
A stone figure of an armadillo

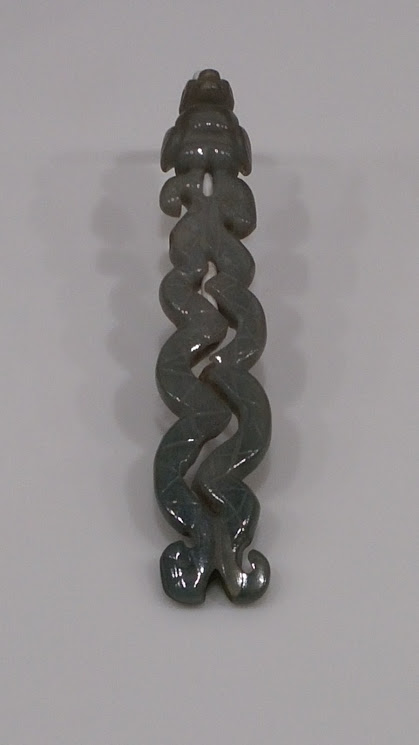
A jade carving of a bird (possibly a quetzal) with long tail feathers

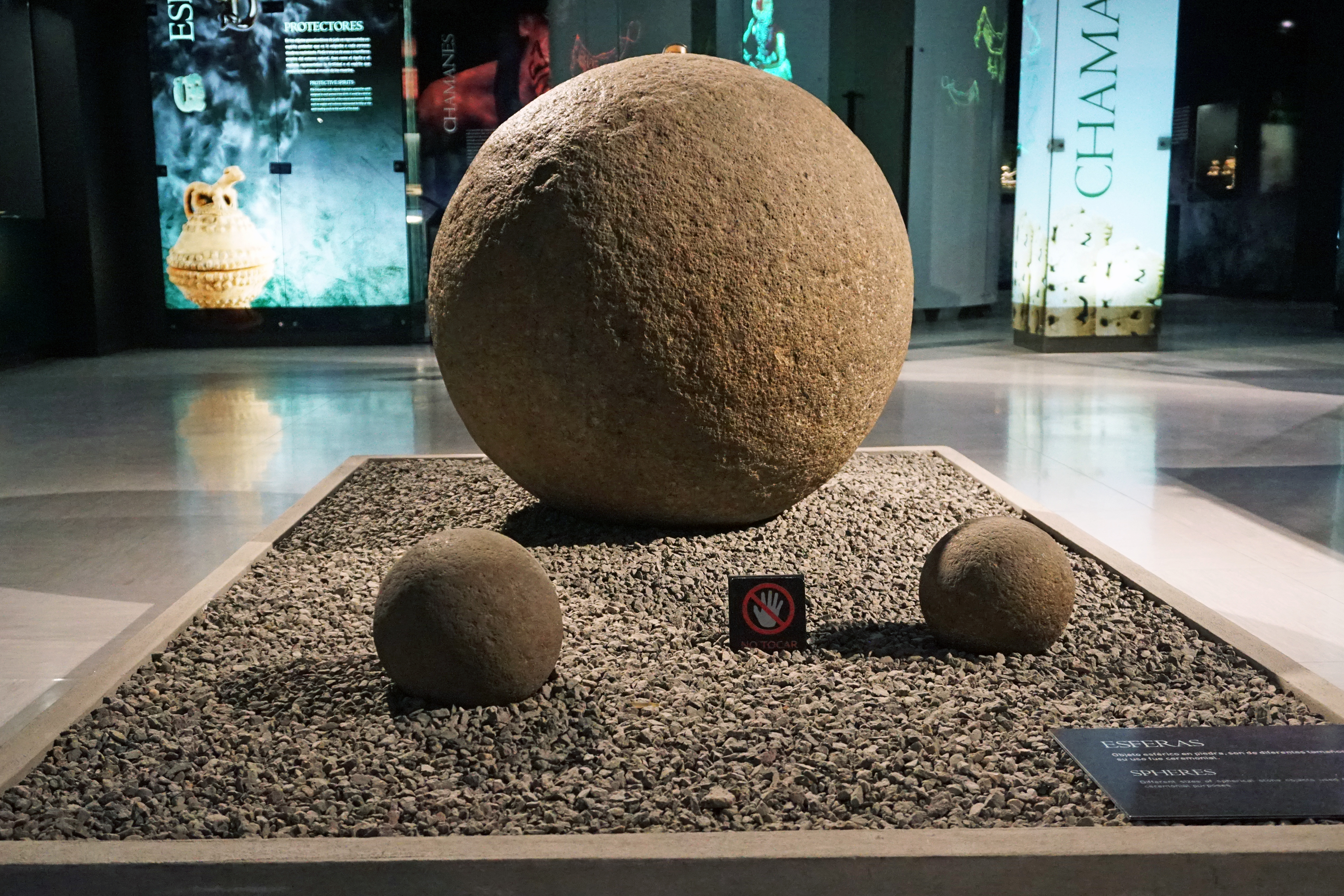
Stone spheres of the Diquís

== See also ==
- List of museums in Costa Rica
- Museo Nacional de Costa Rica
- Museo del Oro Precolombino
