= Levi Vega Martinez =

Costa Rican journalist

Leví Vega Martínez (September 11, 1927 – September 25, 2002) was one of the most prominent Costa Rican journalists.

== Life ==
Born in Liberia, Guanacaste, Vega started working for the local government as young as 17 years old, later he worked as a cymbalist in Liberia's Band where he combined his self-taught job with journalist tasks like reporting different news from Guanacaste. Later on he worked as a telegraphist reporting news to the country's capital San José.

== Works and recognition ==
After that he worked at Diario del País and then he moved to La Nación, one of the most prestigious dailies in the country where he worked for more than 50 years.

During this period he developed his passion for agriculture journalism traveling around the world and visiting countries like China, Japan, South Korea, Taiwan, Germany, Israel, Spain, United States, and all South American countries in a regular basis to report news and find information that could be applied by agricultural communities in Costa Rica.

His efforts were broadly recognized winning many journalism awards from many local and international institutions, among them the country's most prestigious award is the Pío Víquez National Award which he won in 1984.

After his retirement he continued working and traveling in daily La República where he founded the magazine Nuestro Agro (Our Agro) until his last days.

Vega made some international publications along with UN's FAO and many collaborations for local newspapers, books and magazines. He died from colon cancer at age 75. Surviving spouse Anita Morales and his children Luis Román, Vicky and José Elías Vega Morales.
