= Liberia River =

Location
- Country: Costa Rica

Physical characteristics
- Source: Slopes of Rincón de la Vieja Volcano
  - elevation: 1916 m
- Mouth: Tempisque River (leading to Gulf of Nicoya)

Basin features
- Progression: Liberia River → Tempisque River → Gulf of Nicoya → Pacific Ocean

The Liberia River is a river in the northwestern Guanacaste Province of Costa Rica. It rises on the slopes of Rincón de la Vieja Volcano (1,916 m) in the Cordillera Central and follows a southwesterly course to the town of Liberia.

Further downstream, the river joins the Tempisque and enters the Gulf of Nicoya via the Colorado Gulf.
