= Africa Safari Adventure Park =

Park in Liberia, Costa Rica

- África Mía Safari
- Interactive map of Africa Safari Adventure Park
- Type: Urban park. Zoo, Botanical Garden.
- Location: Liberia, Costa Rica
- Coordinates: 10°33′51″N 85°24′00″W
- Area: 100 hectares (250 acres)
- Status: Open all year
- Website: www.africasafaricostarica.com

The Africa Safari Adventure Park (previously África mía Safari) is a private wildlife park of approximately 100 hectares, located in El Salto, south of the city of Liberia, Costa Rica. All animals have an African safari motif with enclosures for animals such as zebras, warthogs and giraffes, all of which multiply in the safari. The park also provides zip lines, nature trails through rain forest with a prominent waterfall and a lagoon for kayaking. The vast alluvial plain of the Guanacaste Province and swampy wetlands provide the Safari with an atmosphere that resembles that of certain plains of Africa.

Between 30–40 animals are born every year in the reserve. The animal park is the first in Central America with a giraffe born in captivity.

== Exhibits ==
África mía Safari has only herbivore animals in exhibits. There are approximately 250 individual animals of 16 different species.

- Spanish ibex
- Emu
- Blue peafowl
- Blue wildebeest (C. t. albojubatus)
- White-tailed deer
- Forest antelope
- Common eland
- Gemsbok
- Nilgai
- Reticulated giraffe
- Ankole-Watusi
- Chapman's zebra
- Grant's zebra
- Arabian camel
- Southern ostrich (S. c. australis)

== See also ==
- List of zoos by country: Costa Rica zoos
