= Pre-Columbian Gold Museum =

Art museum in Costa Rica

- Museo del Oro Precolombino
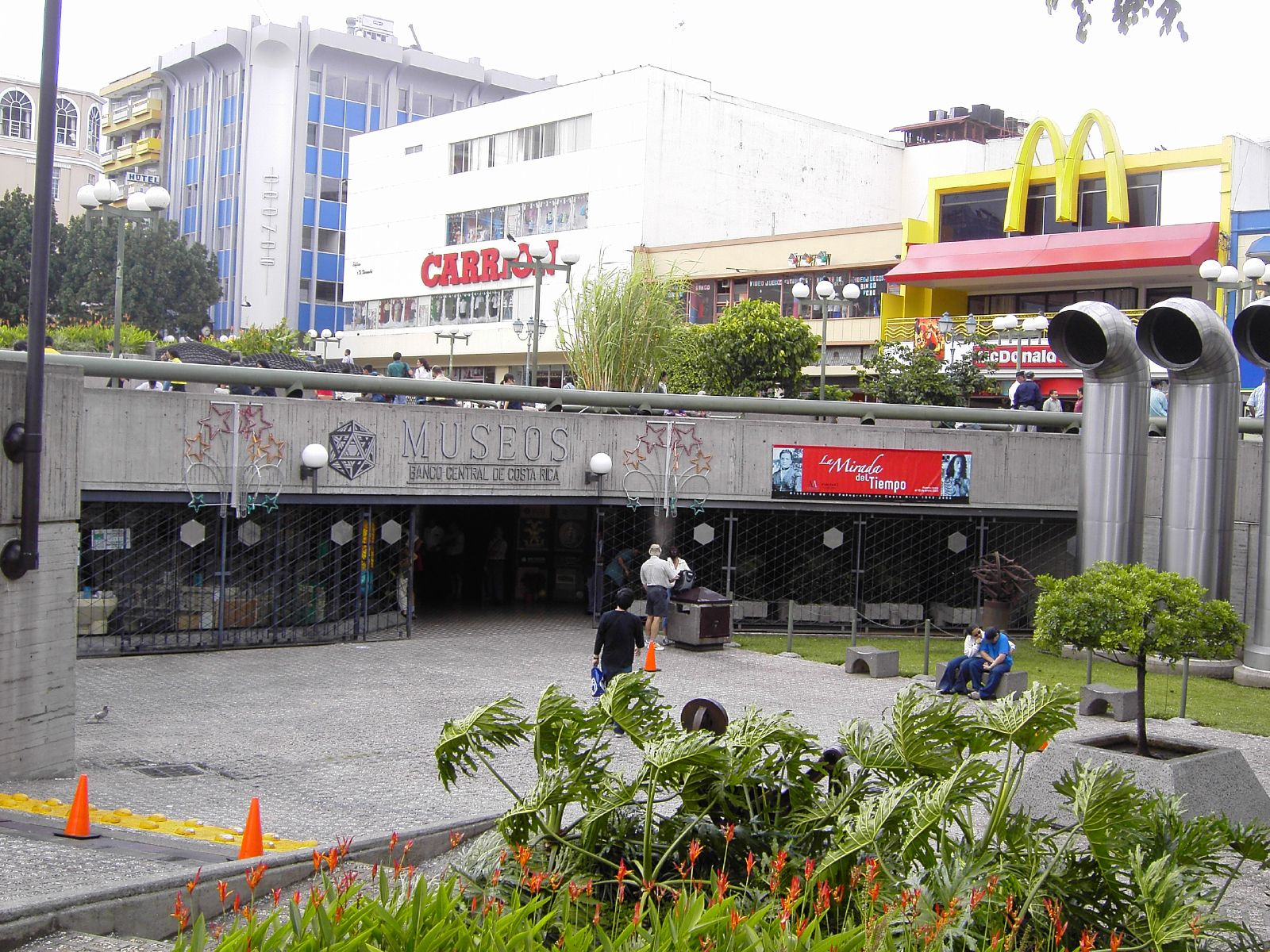
- Location underneath the Plaza de la Cultura
- Established: 1985
- Location: San José, Costa Rica
- Coordinates: 9°56′01″N 84°04′36″W
- Curator: Central Bank of Costa Rica
- Website: museosdelbancocentral.org/eng/

The Pre-Columbian Gold Museum (Spanish: Museo del Oro Precolombino, officially Spanish: Museo de Oro Precolombino Álvaro Vargas Echeverría) is a museum in San José, Costa Rica. It is located in a subterranean building underneath the "Plaza de la Cultura" and is owned and curated by the Banco Central de Costa Rica. The museum has an archaeological collection of 3,567 Pre-Columbian artifacts made up of 1,922 ceramic pieces, 1,586 gold objects, 46 stone objects, 4 jade, and 9 glass or bead objects. The gold collection dates from 300 to 400 BC to 1550 AD.

== Collection ==
The collection includes animal (notably frogs, eagles, jaguars, alligators, deer) figurines, amulets, earrings, erotic statuettes and several dioramas including El Guerrero, a life sized gold warrior figure adorned with gold ornaments in a glass case and a detailed scale model of a Pre-Columbian village. There is also a replica of a pre-Columbian grave containing 88 gold objects which was unearthed on a banana plantation in southeastern Costa Rica in the 1950s.

In Costa Rican history, gold was considered a symbol of authority and the items are testament to the craftmanship of the Pre-Columbian period.

== Nearby museums ==
The Museo Numismático (National Coin Museum) is also located in the same building on the ground level and features displays dating back to 1236, including coins, banknotes and unofficial items such as coffee tokens. The "Casa de Moneda" is also located on the ground level with information on the history of minting in Costa Rica and displays illustrating its development. The collection includes Costa Rica's first coin, the Media Escudo which was minted in 1825.

== Gallery ==
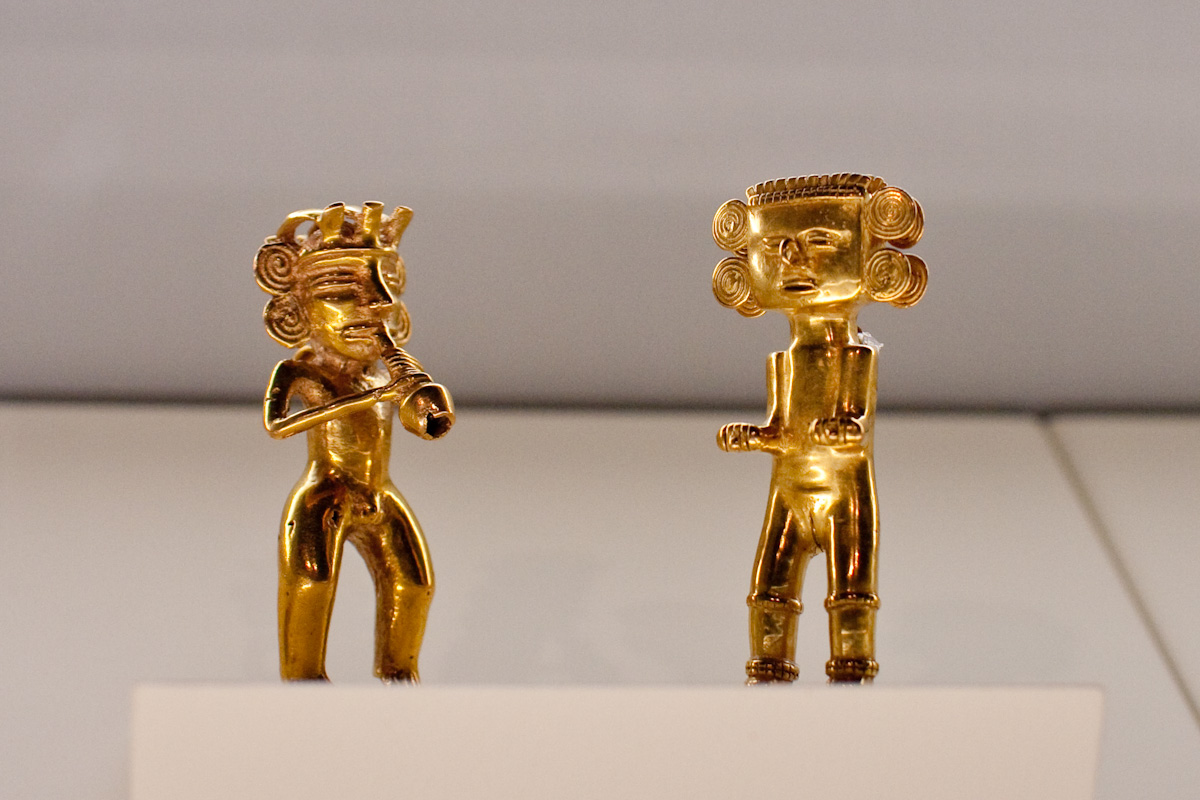
Gold figures, musician and dancer

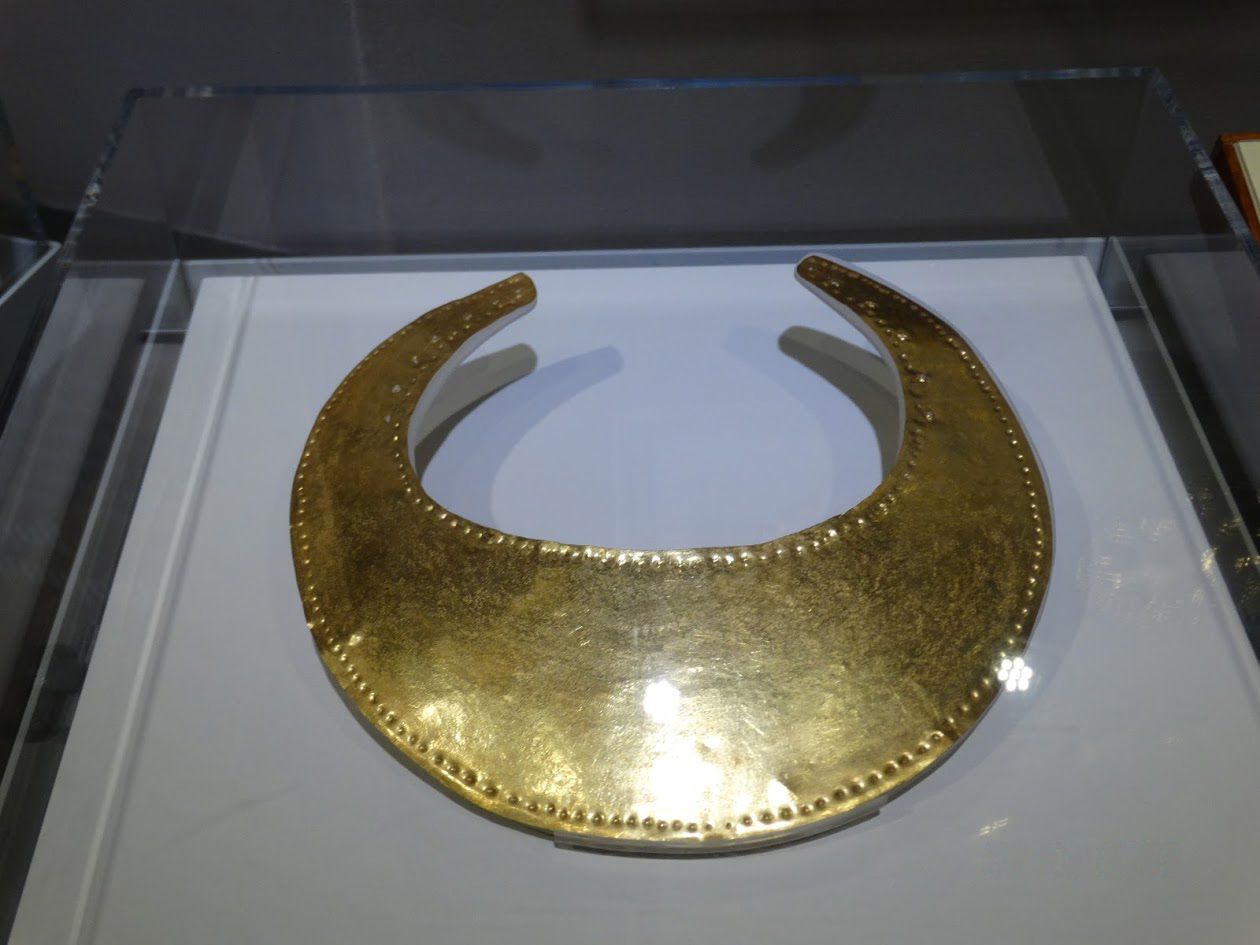
Gold necklace

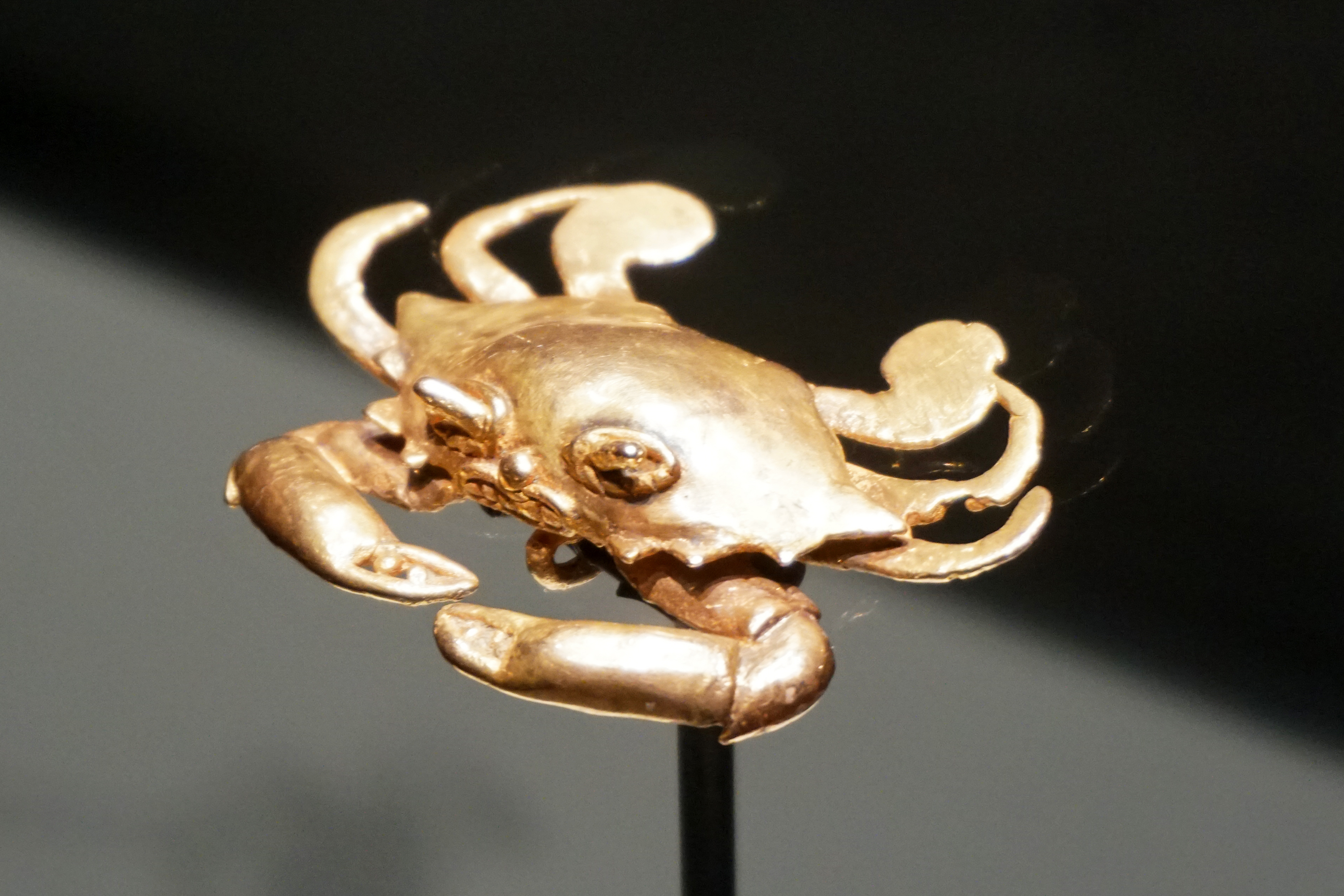
Gold crab

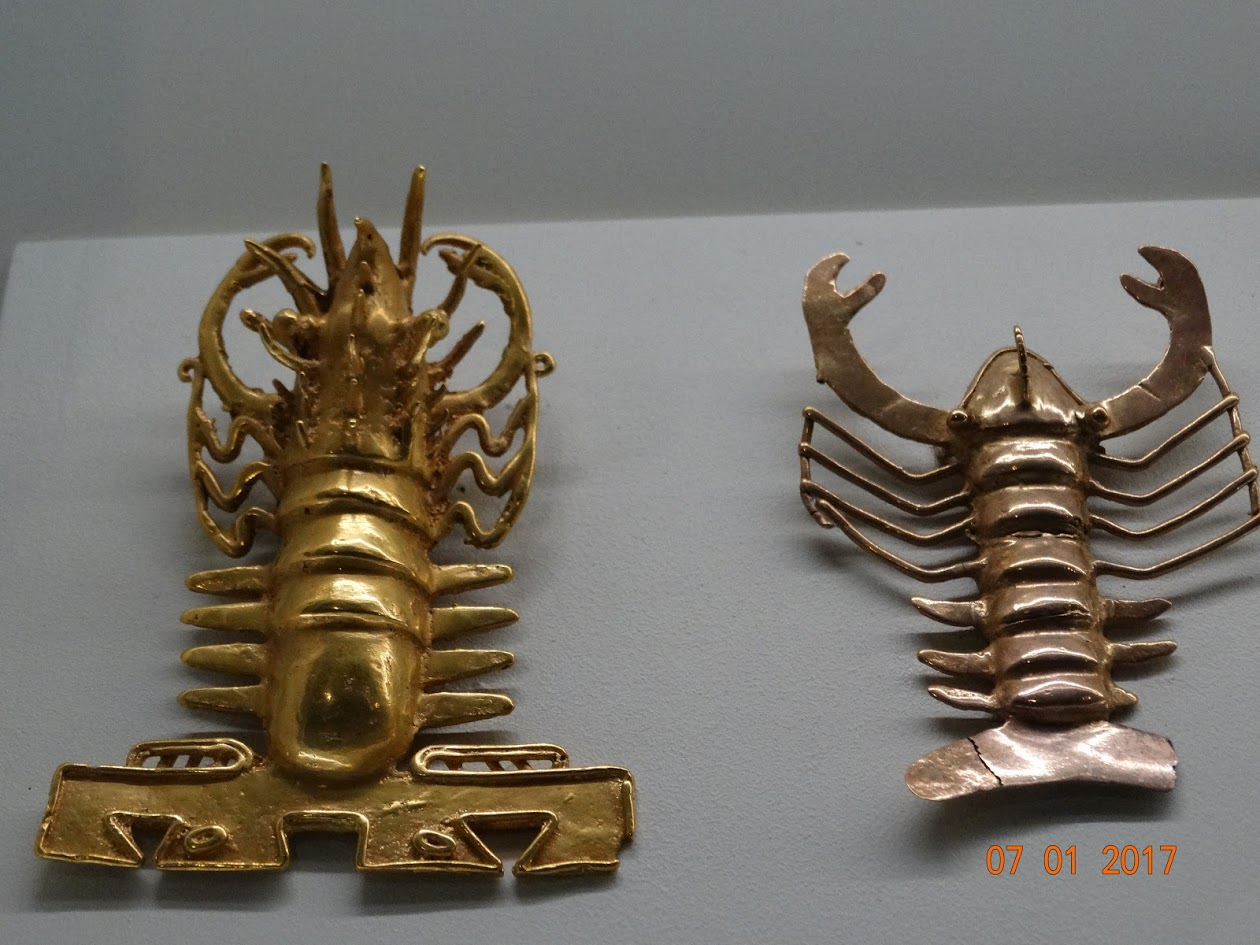
Gold lobsters

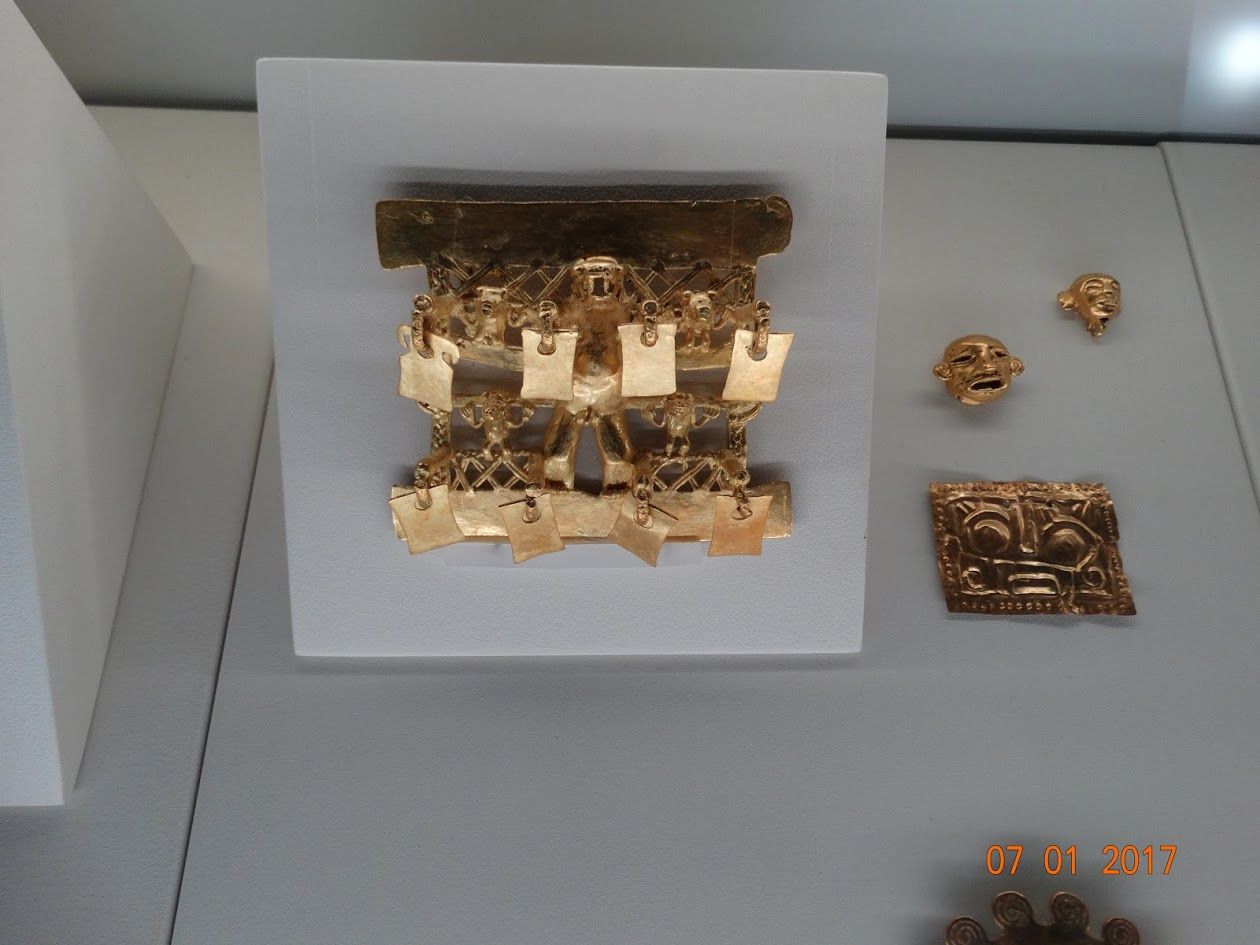
Gold barrette

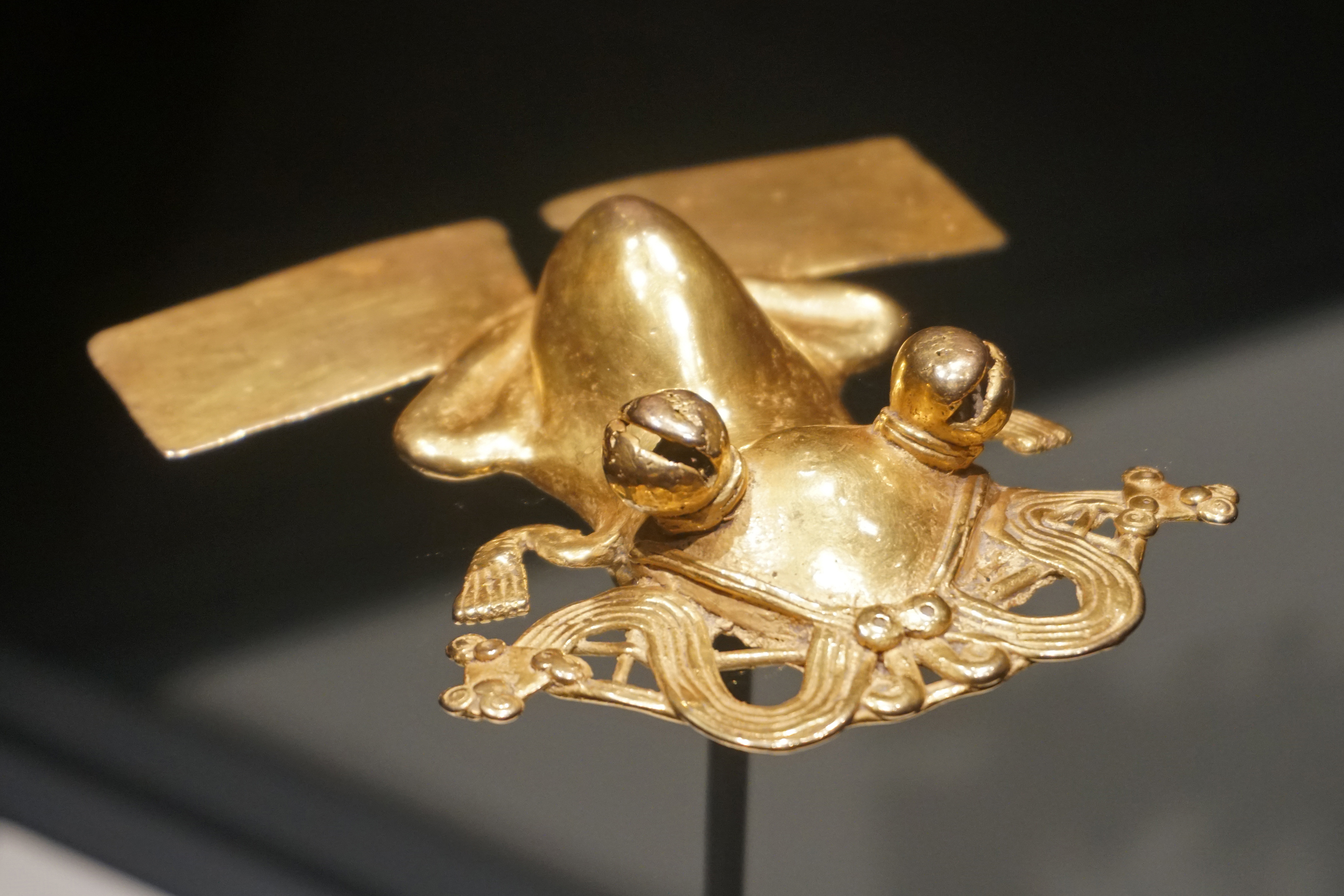
Gold frog

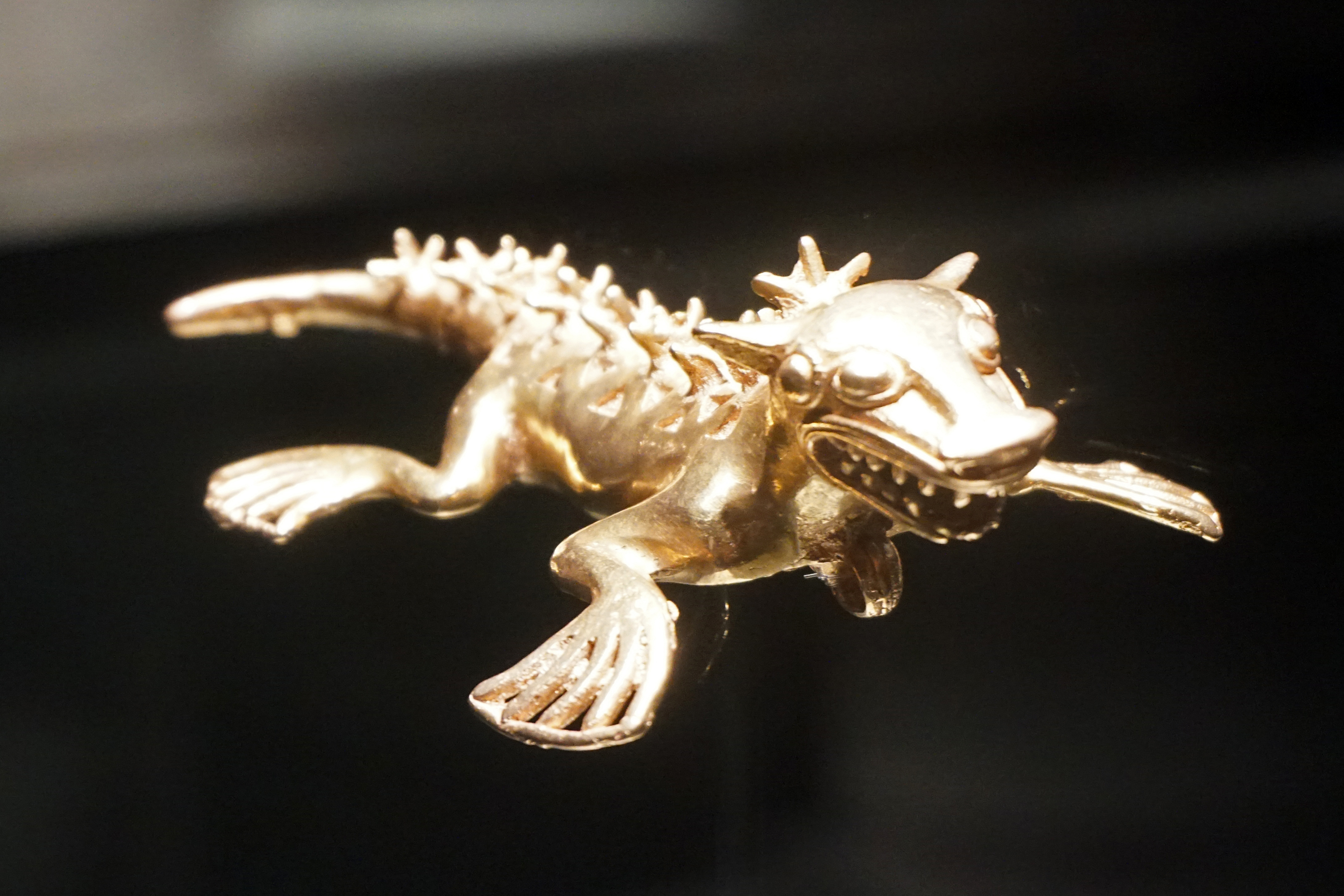
Gold alligator with feline face

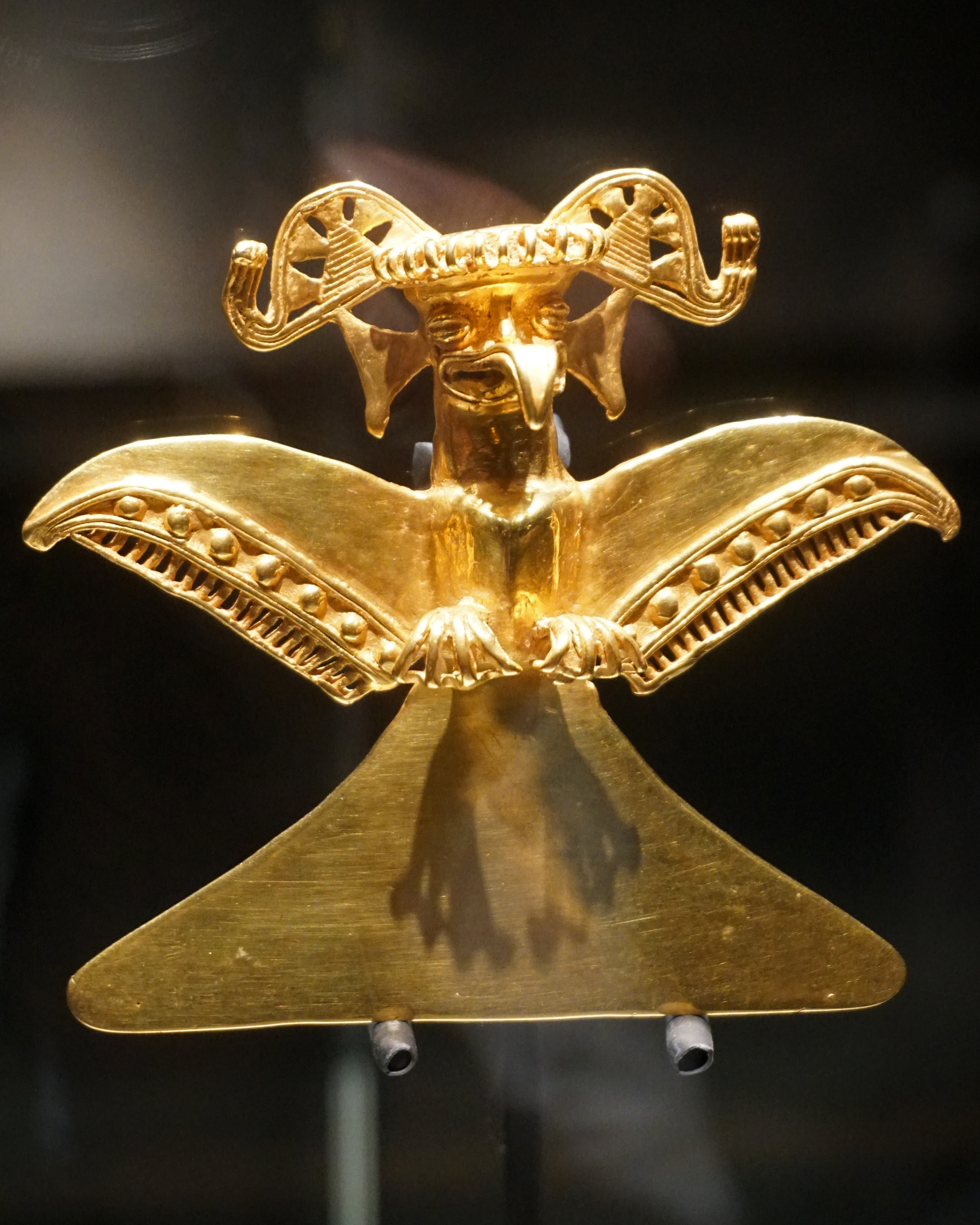
Gold harpy eagle

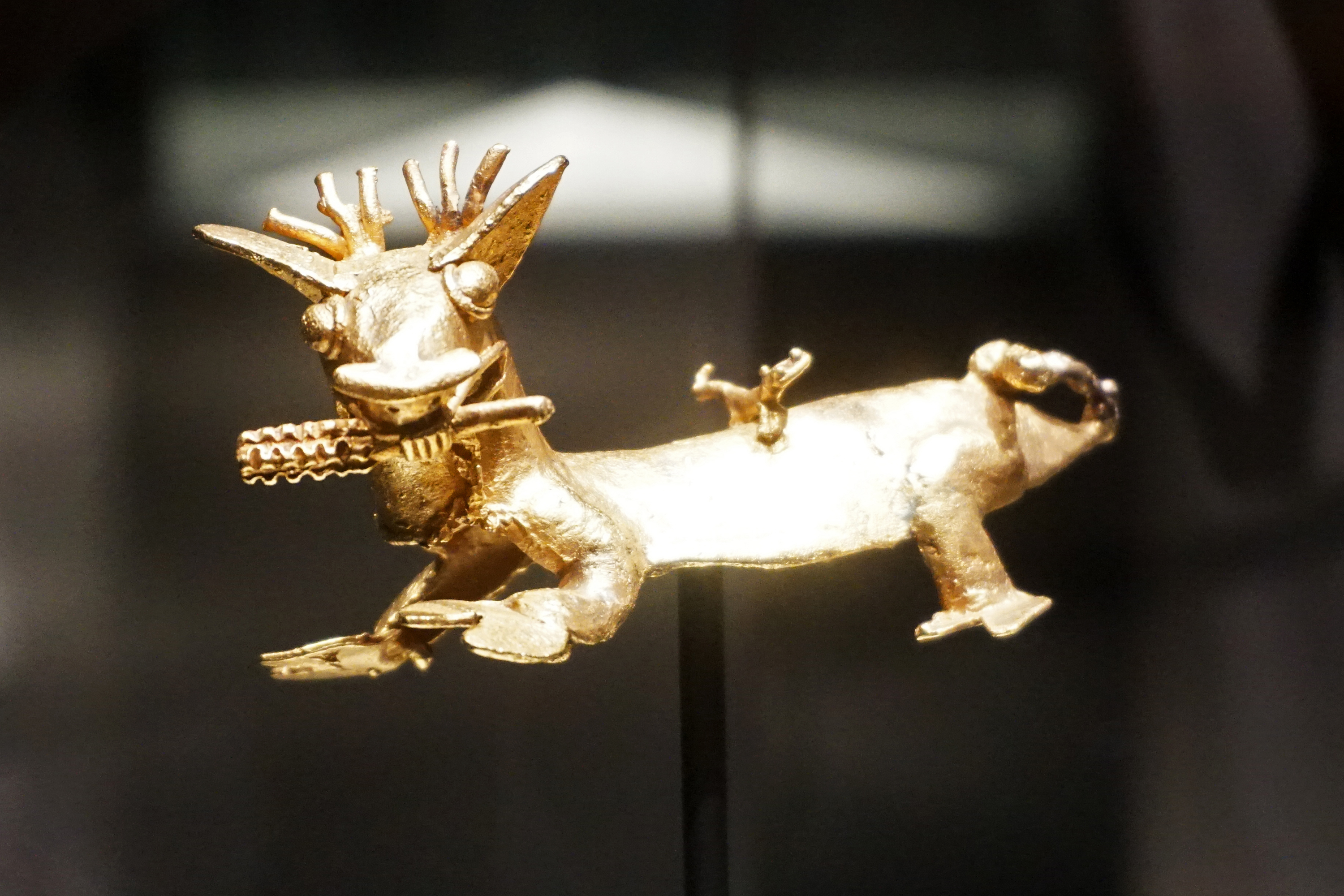
Gold deer eating corn

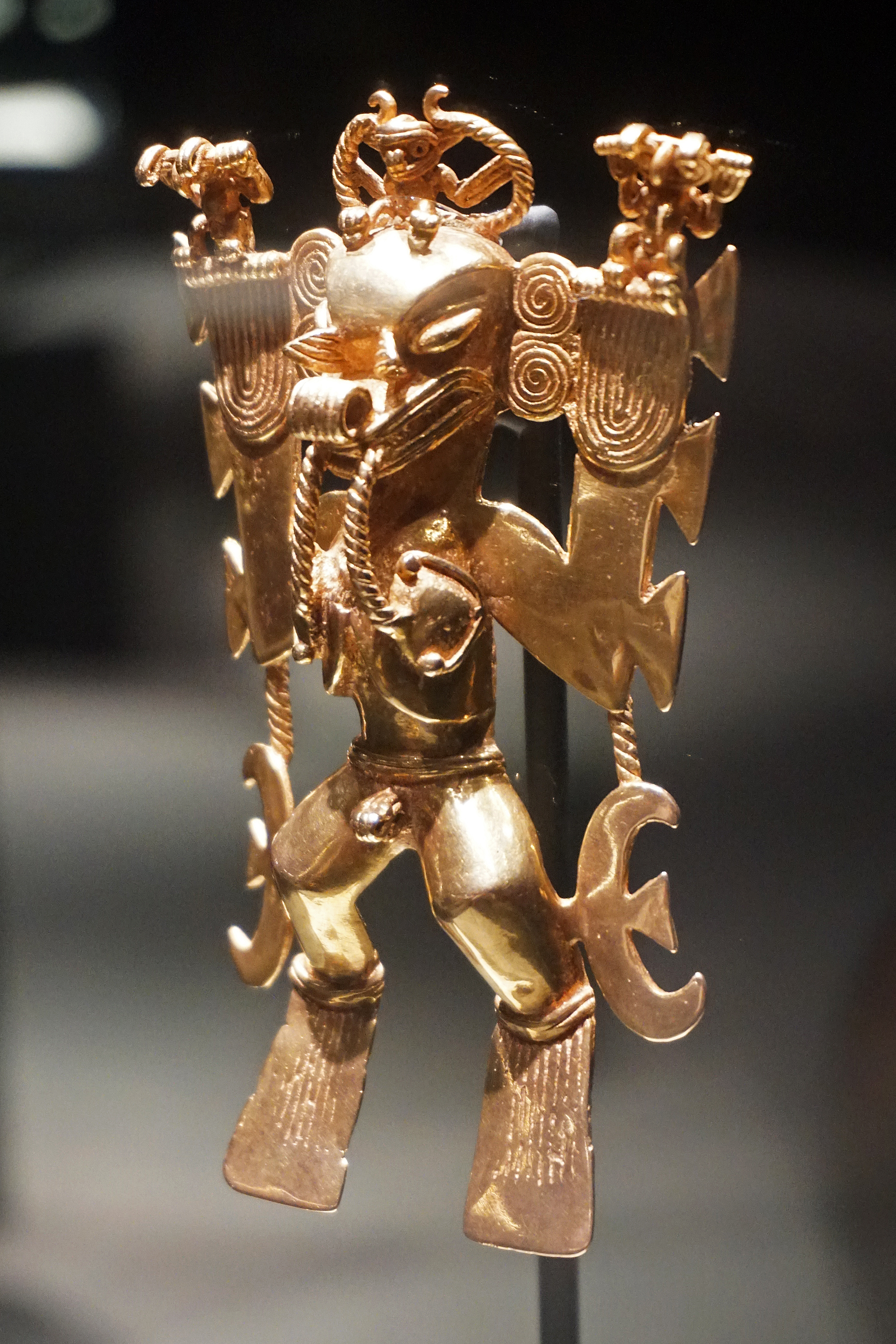
Gold figure of a Shaman

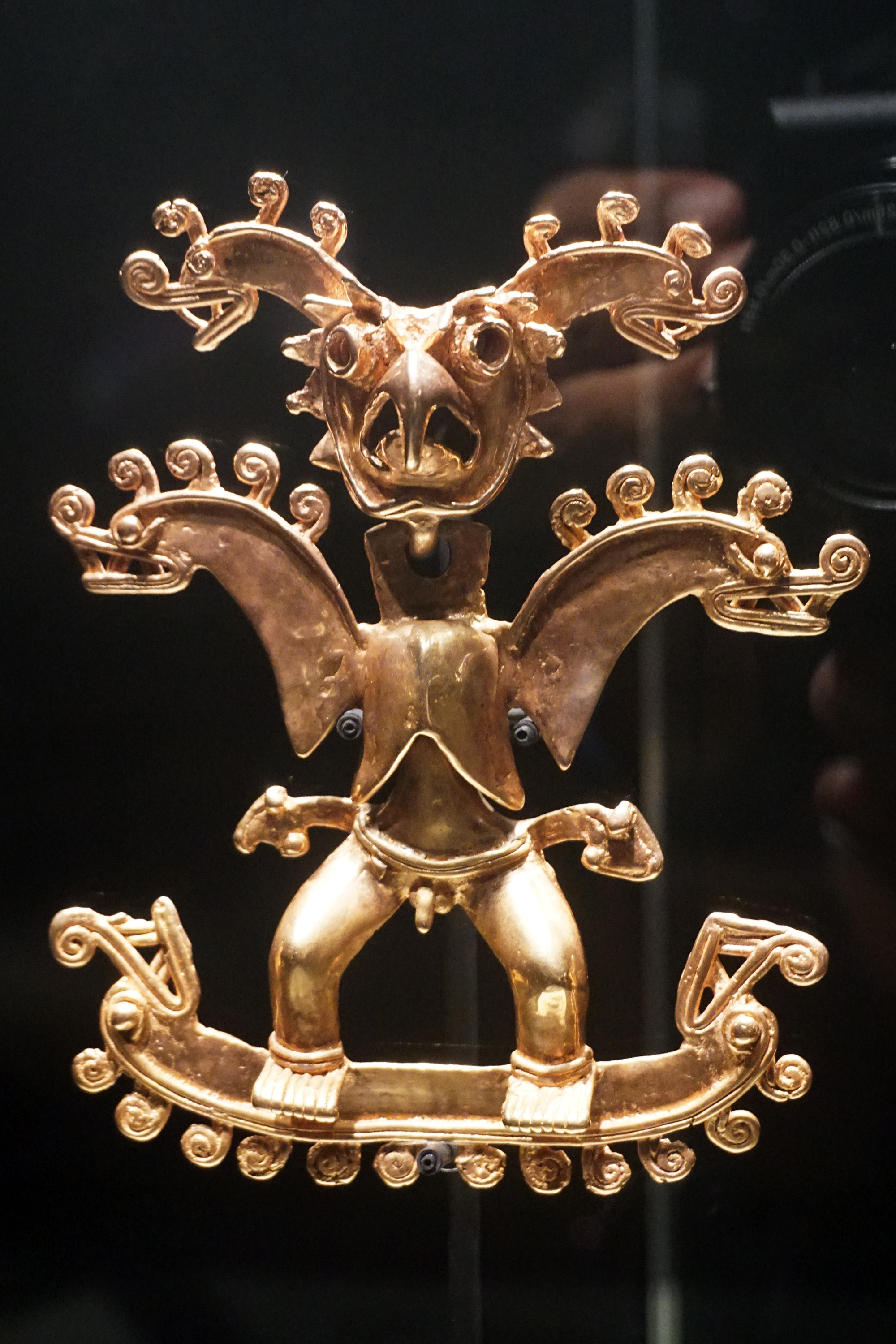
Gold figure of Sibu god

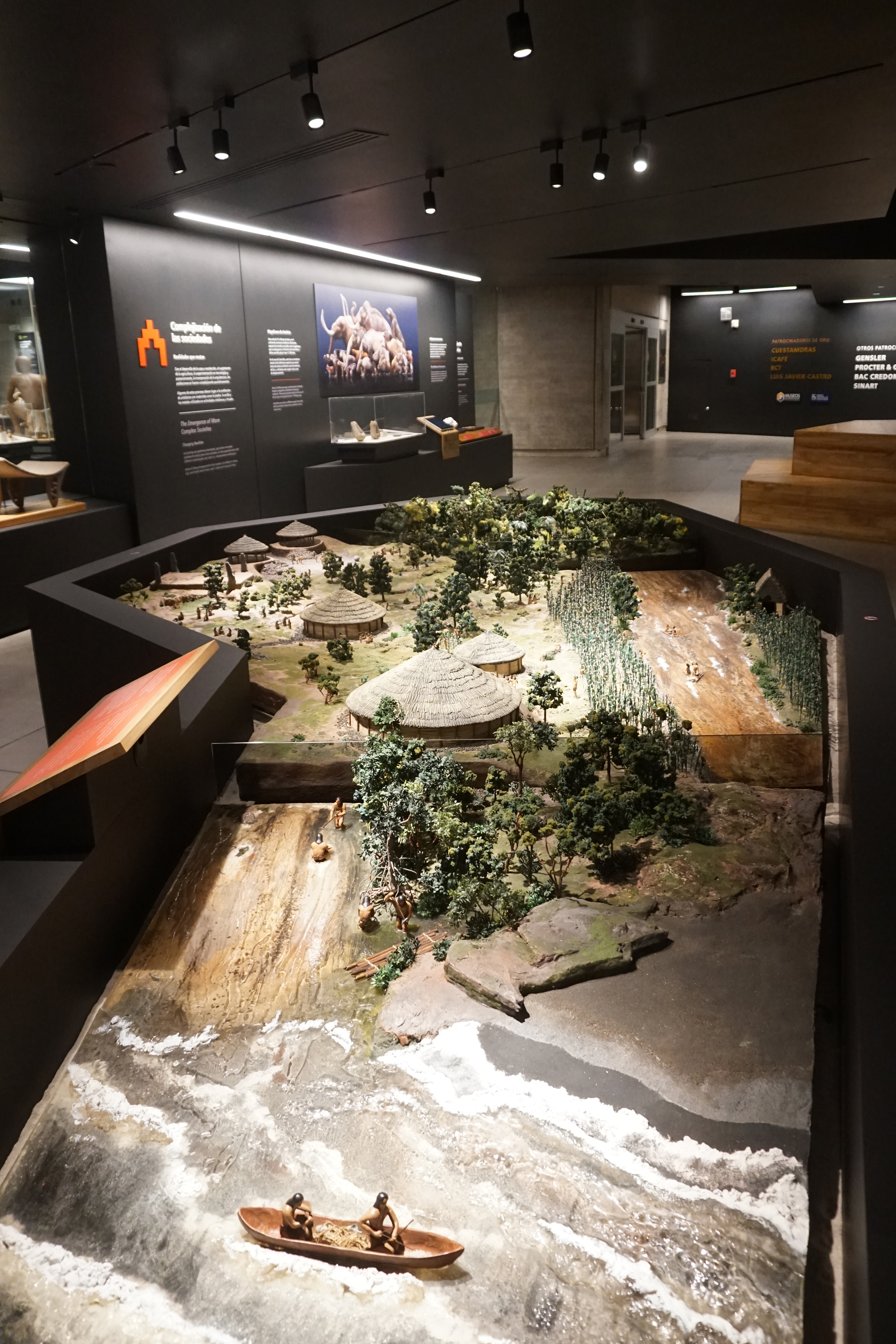
Diorama of a pre-Columbian village

== See also ==
- List of museums in Costa Rica
- Museo del Jade
- Museo Nacional de Costa Rica
