= Museo Nacional de Costa Rica =

National Museum of Costa Rica
- Museo Nacional de Costa Rica

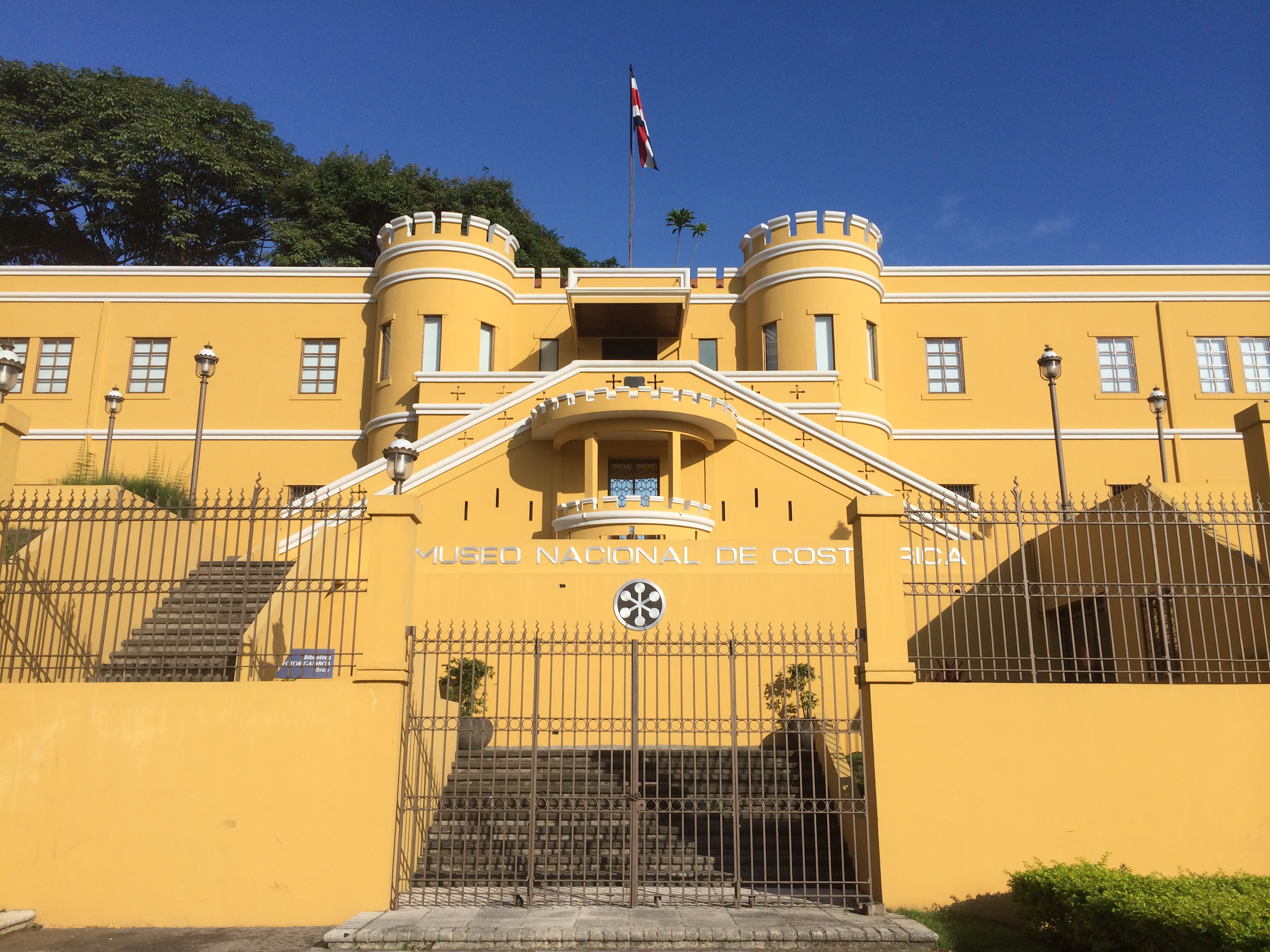
- Museum front entrance
- Established: 1887 (at the Universidad de Santo Tomas); 1950 (current location)
- Location: Calle 17, between Central and Second Avenue; San José, Costa Rica
- Coordinates: 9°55′58″N 84°04′17″W
- Type: National museum
- Director: Cristhian Kandler
- Website: www.museocostarica.go.cr

The Museo Nacional de Costa Rica is the national museum of Costa Rica, located in the capital of San José. It is located at Calle 17, between Central and Second Avenue, Cuesta de Moras. It moved to its current location in 1950. The museum holds the nation's treasures, such as the memorial of Glory, and is home to many historical documents of the nation's upbringing, significant events, and tragedies of the nation's past. Built in 1917, the museum was originally used for quarters for soldiers and held barracks, and was used in the Costa Rican Civil War in 1948.

== Repatriation of artifacts ==
The museum has received hundreds of objects in recent years from the U.S. as part of efforts to repatriate artifacts that were removed earlier from Costa Rica.

== Gallery ==
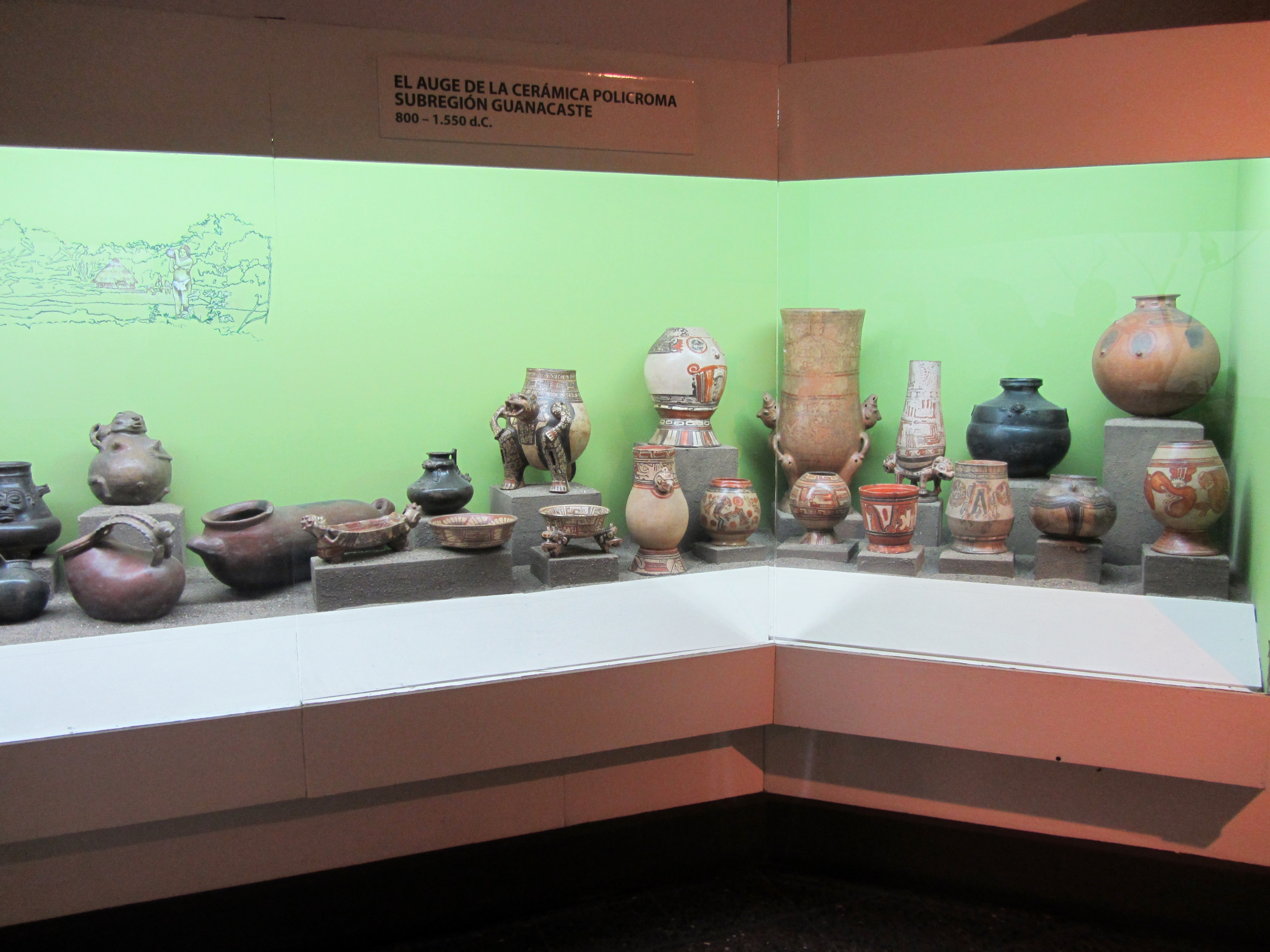
Ceramic objects, Pre-Columbian History

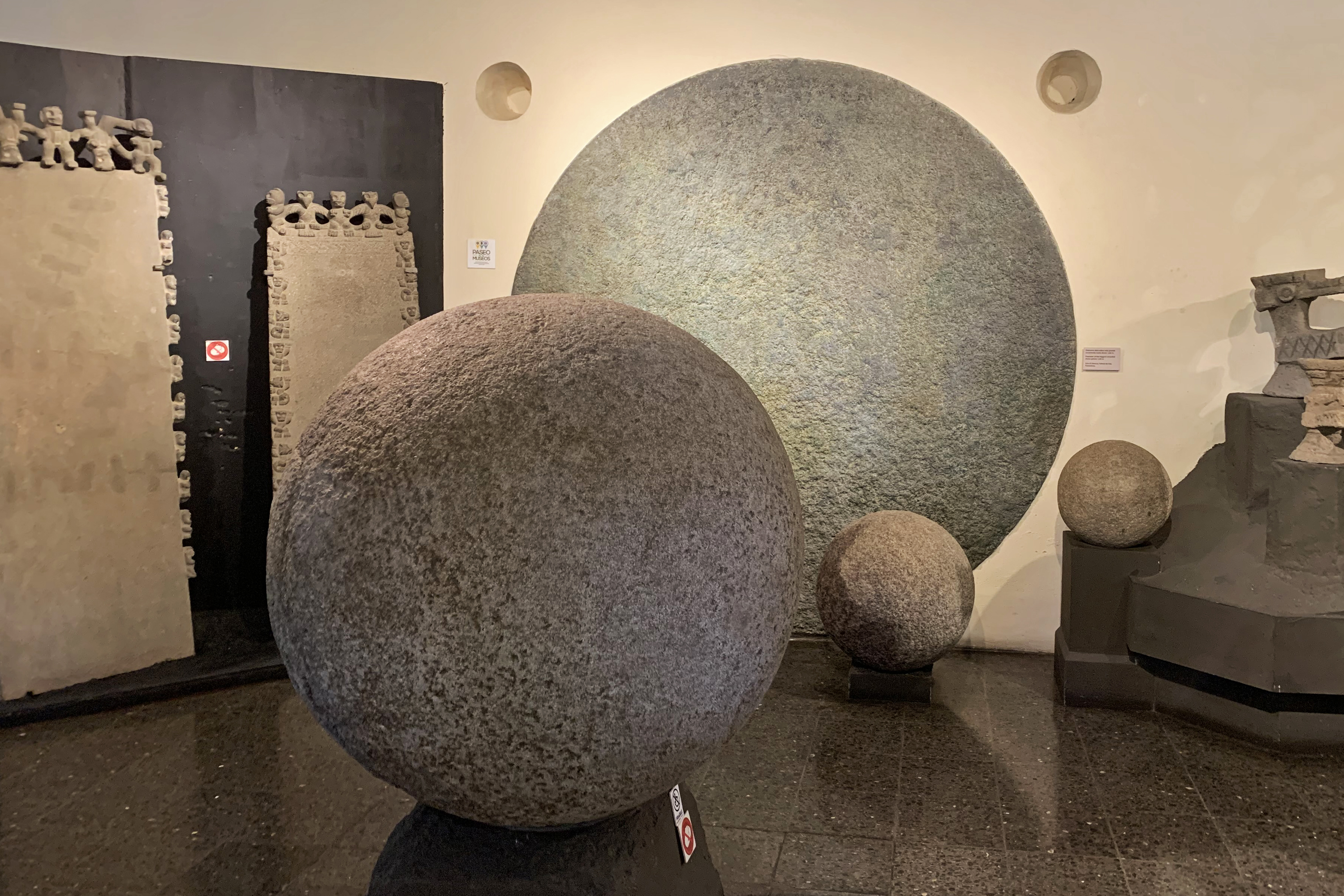
Diquis stone spheres, Pre-Columbian History

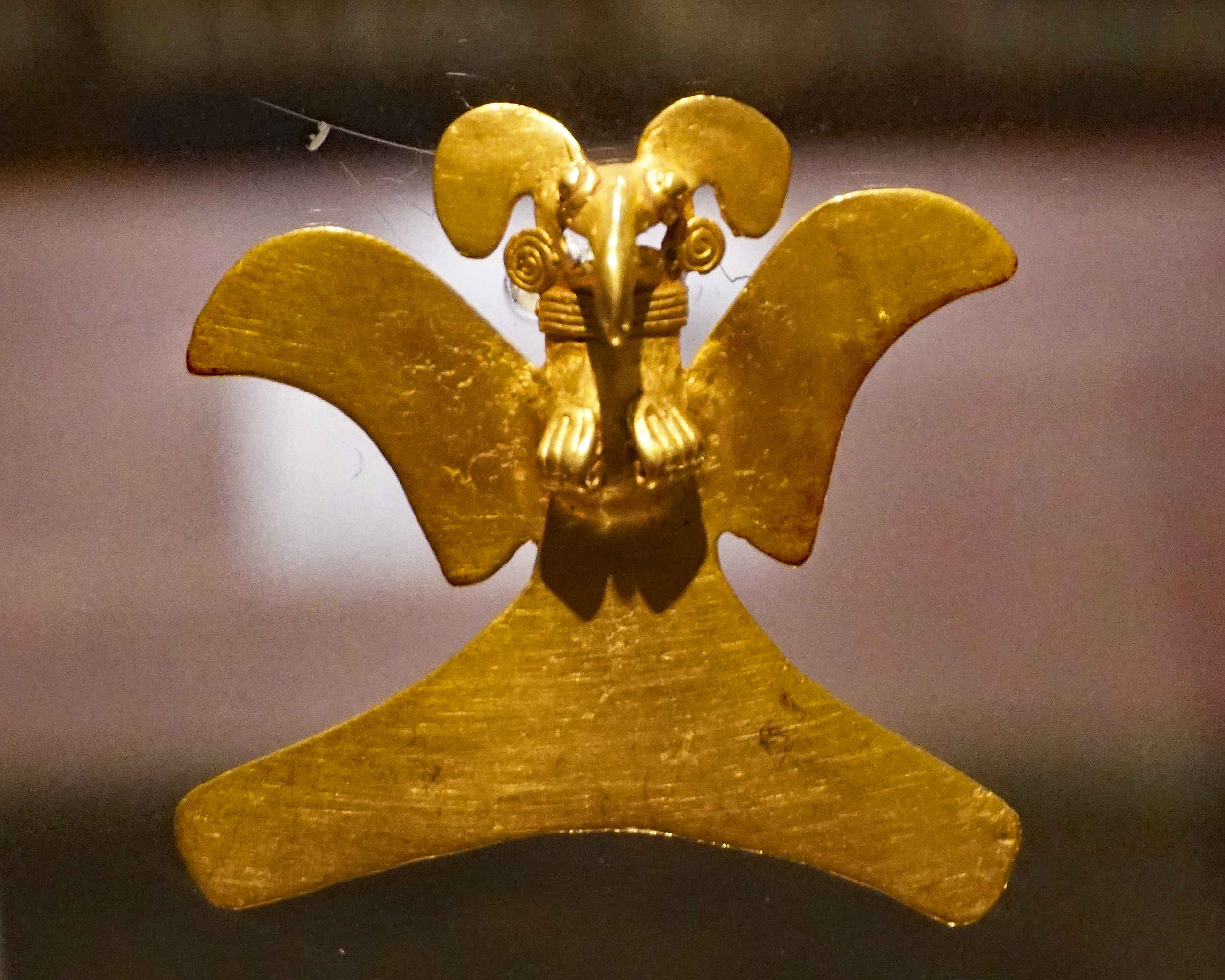
Gold eagle-shaped pendant, Gold Room

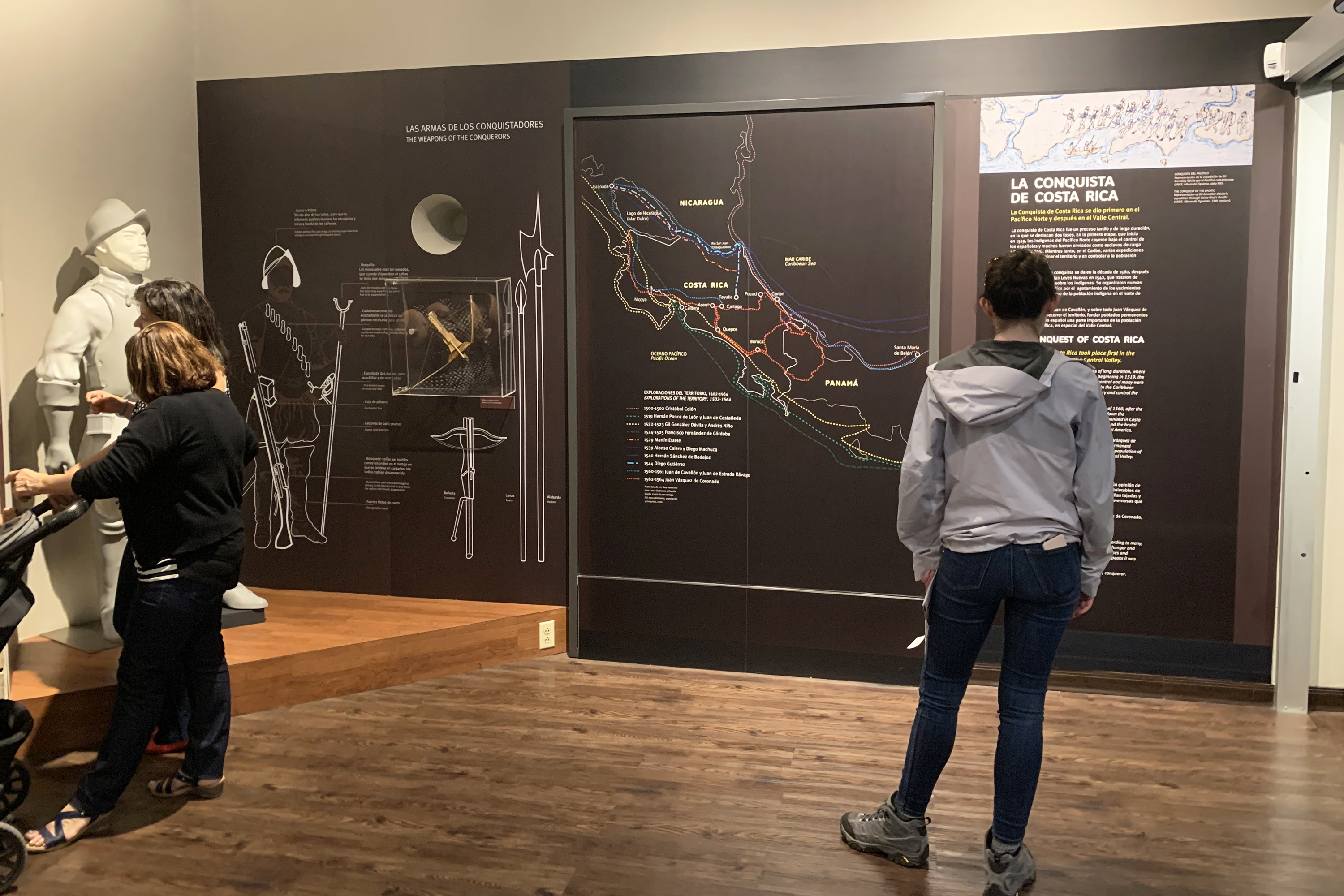
Colonial Room, History of Costa Rica

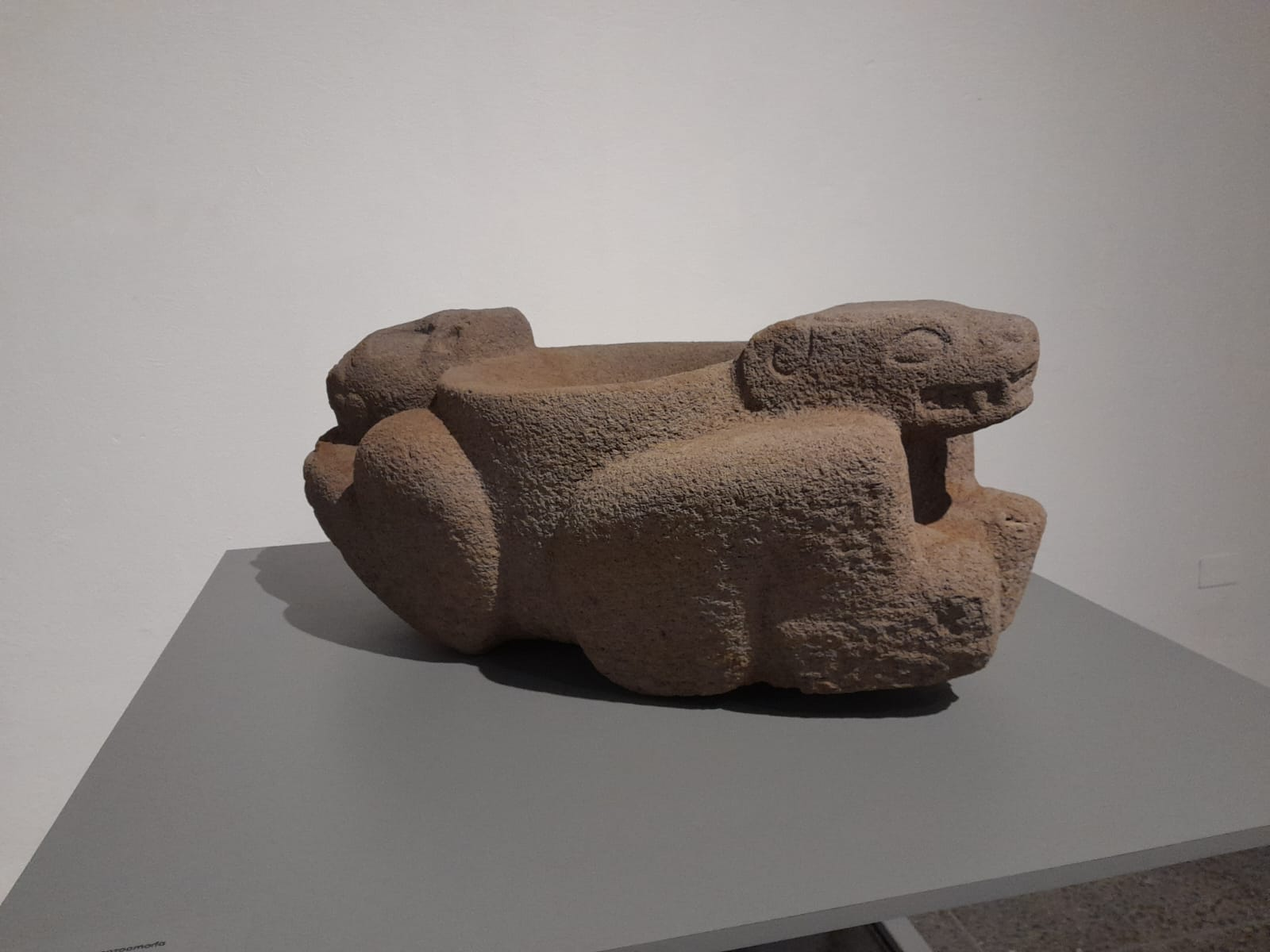
An archaeological piece.

Permanent exhibitions

== See also ==
- List of museums in Costa Rica
- Museo del Jade Marco Fidel Tristán Castro
- Museo del Oro Precolombino
