= Museo de Sabanero =

Sabanero Museum
- Museo de Sabanero
- Established: 1990
- Location: Liberia, Guanacaste Province, Costa Rica
- Coordinates: 10°37′37″N 85°26′11″W
- Type: Historic house museum, Cowboy culture
- Website: Facebook page

The Museo de Sabanero is a museum in Liberia, Costa Rica, founded in 1990 by an executive decree issued by President Rafael Ángel Calderón Fournier. The museum focuses on cowboy culture in Northwest Costa Rica, as Liberia was historically known for raising livestock. Liberia and the surrounding region have a tropical savanna climate, noticeably drier than the rest of the country, which supports cattle ranching. The museum is located in the Casa de Culture, a colonial-era house. The museum has a notable collection of lassos and saddleware (including many decorated saddles), spurs, and lanterns, given that the majority of Guanacastecos make a living as cowboys with their Brahman cattle.
