= Museo La Salle =

Museo de Ciencias Naturales La Salle

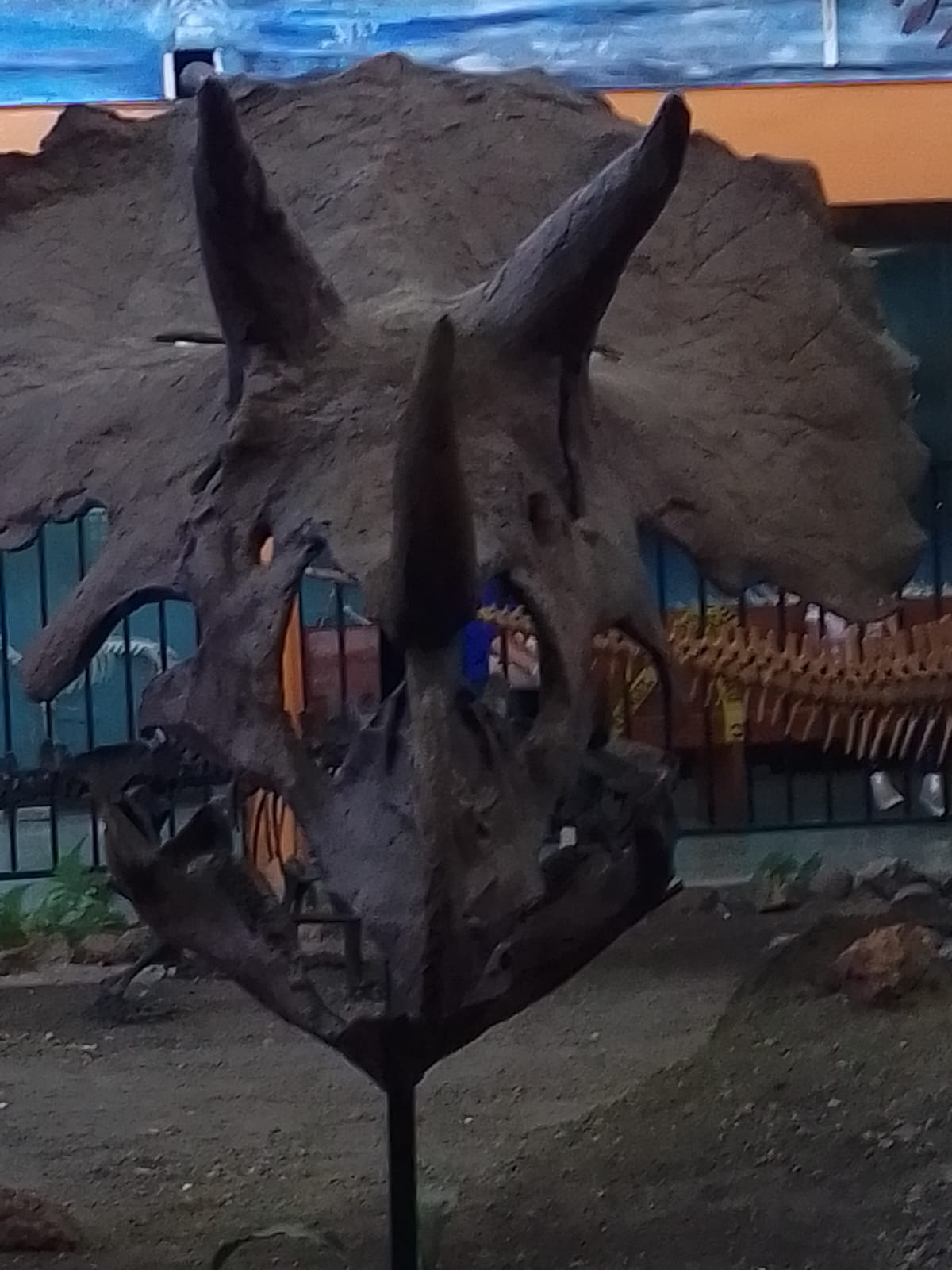
- A replica of a triceratops skull

- Location within Costa Rica
- Established: 1 January 1960
- Location: San José, Costa Rica
- Coordinates: 9.9325°N 84.1108°W
- Type: Natural history museum
- Website: https://www.museolasalle.ed.cr/

The Museo de Ciencias Naturales La Salle (English: Natural Science Museum La Salle) is a natural history museum in San José, Costa Rica. It consists of 3 main halls where exhibitions are organized by categories, such as insects, ichthyology, herpetology, ornithology, mammals, and anthropology.

The museum was founded in 1960 by Eduardo Fernández, a science teacher at Colegio La Salle, who with the help of his students began the collection.

== Exhibitions ==
The museum has over 65,000 pieces in exhibition, with sections like paleontology, including replicas of dinosaurs fossils, butterflies, geology and mineralogy with many minerals and rocks, and malacology with the collection of molluscs. It also has a large collection of taxidermy that includes lots of species of fish, reptiles, mammals and birds, that are well preserved thanks to the taxidermy.

It has been considered as one of the most complete museums in all of Latin America.
