= Liberia, Costa Rica =

District in Liberia canton, and city of Guanacaste province, Costa Rica

Liberia
- District
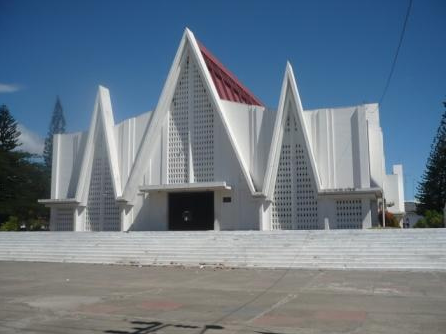
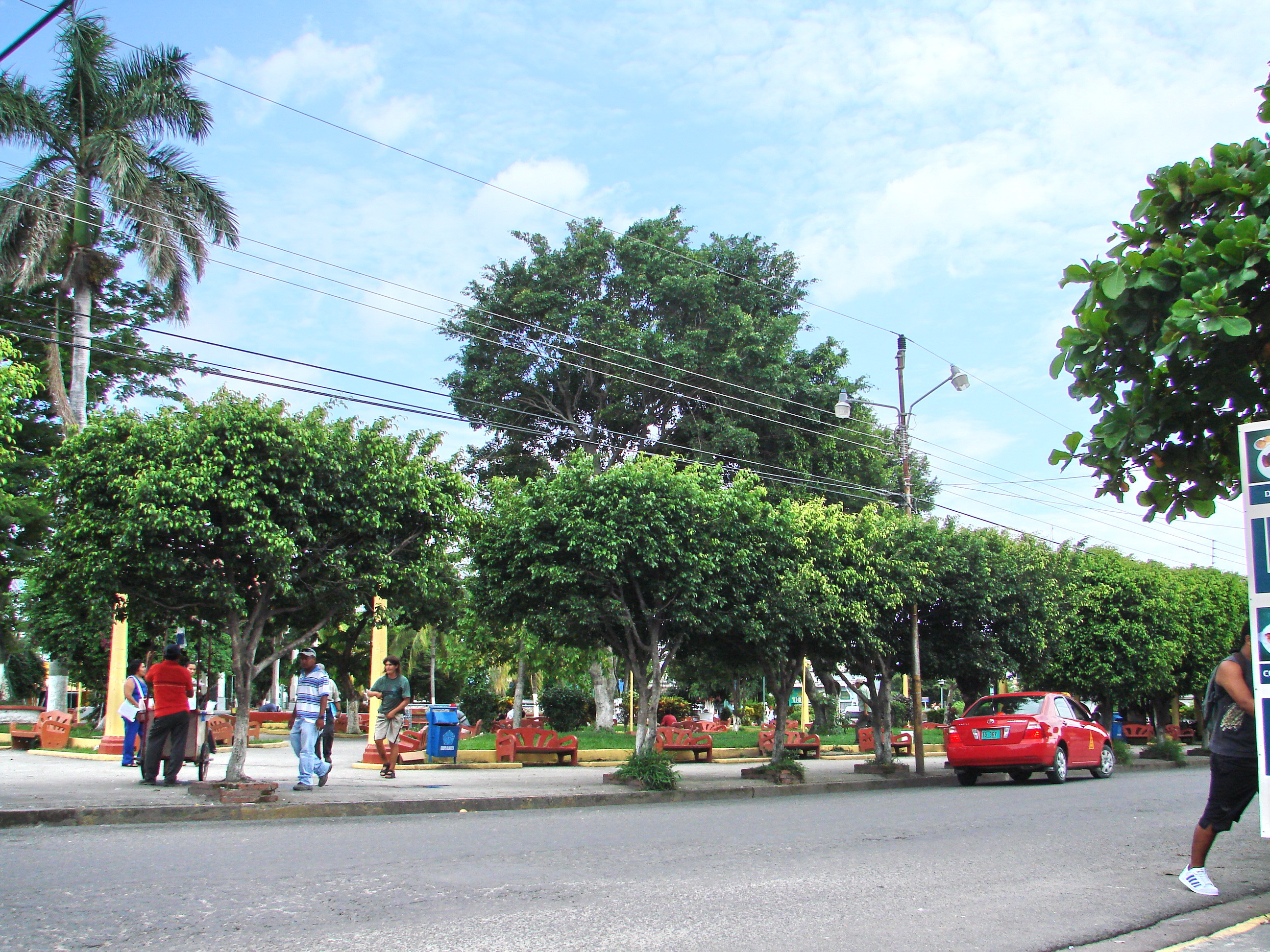
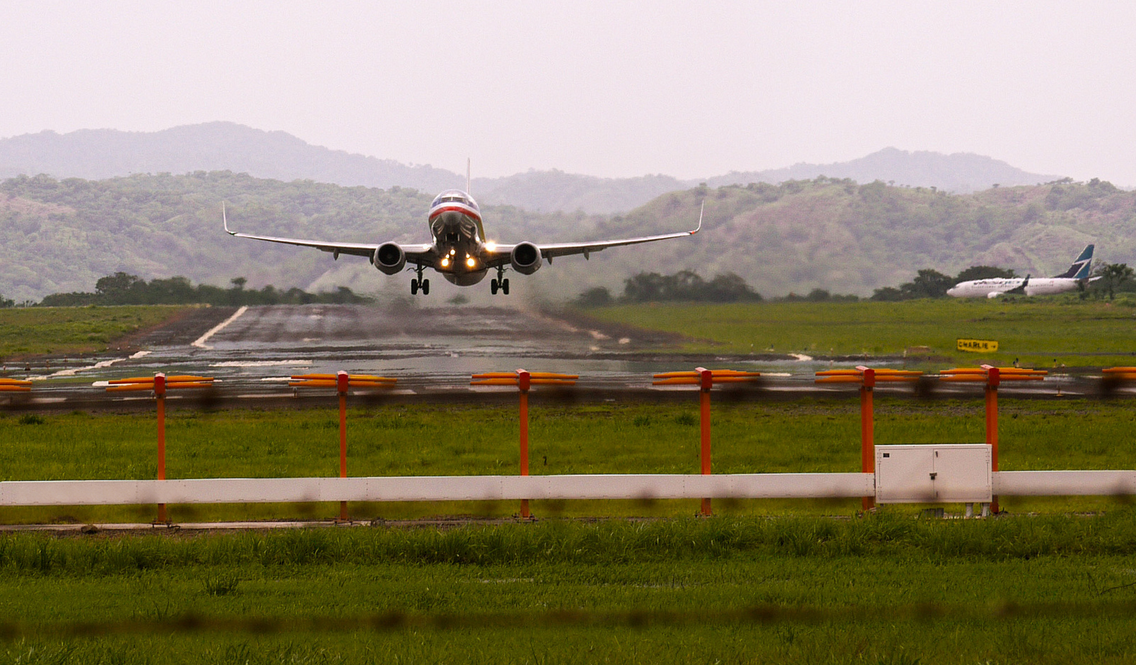
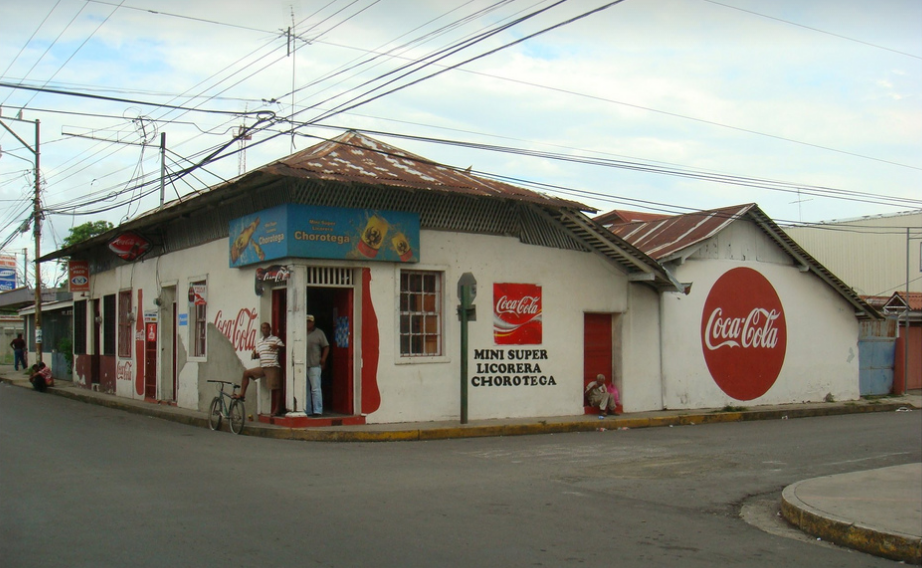
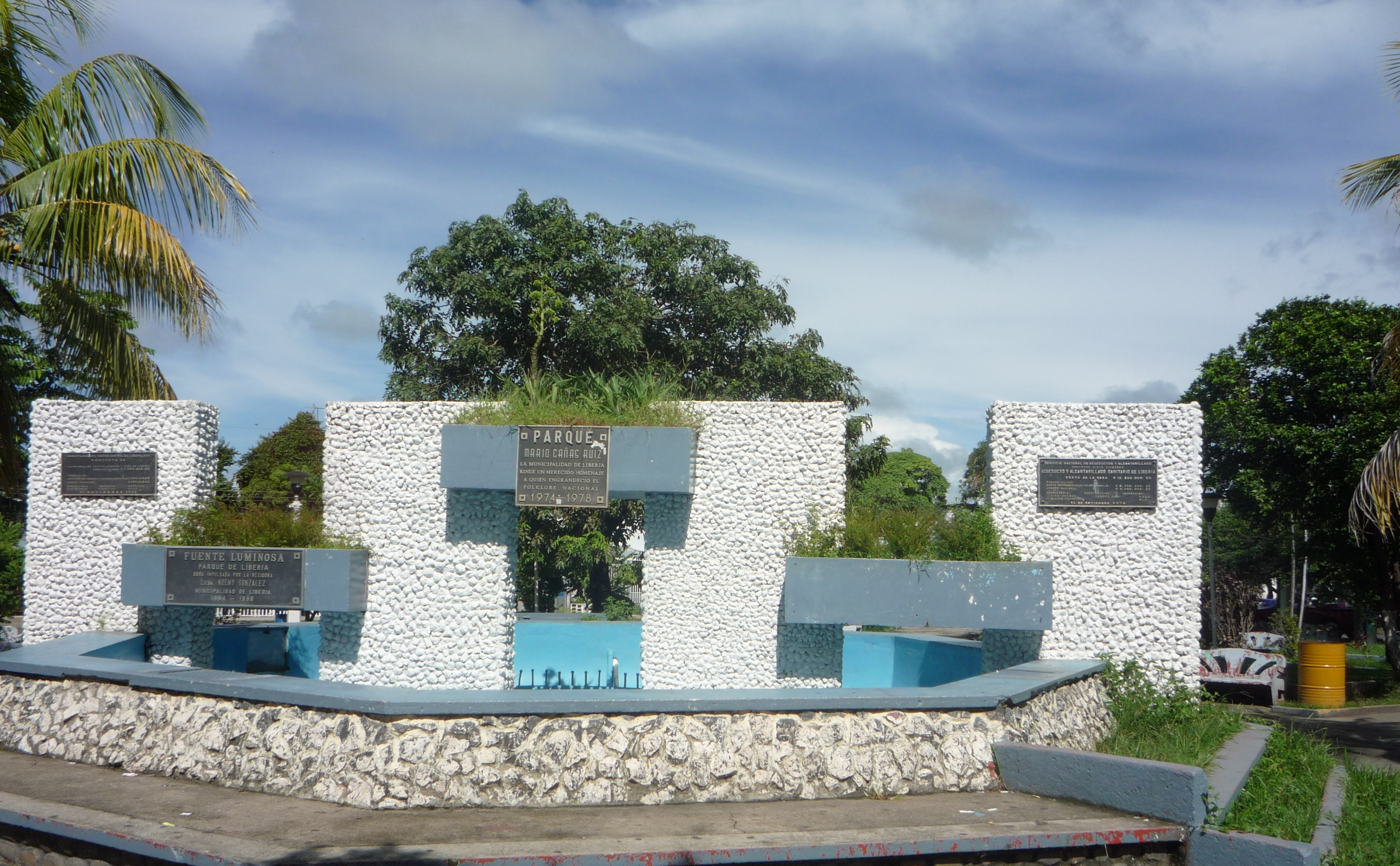
- Images, from top down, left to right: Immaculate Church of Concepcion de Maria, Central Park, Daniel Oduber Quirós International Airport, the Chorotega, Mario Cañas Ruiz Park Monument.
- Motto(s): De la patria por nuestra voluntad (Spanish) "From The Homeland Out of Our Own Will"
- Interactive map of Liberia
- Location of Liberia within Costa Rica
- Coordinates: 10°38′N 85°26′W
- Country: Costa Rica
- Province: Guanacaste
- Canton: Liberia
- Founded: 1836

Area
  - Total: 561.57 km^{2} (216.82 sq mi)
- Elevation: 144 m (472 ft)

Population (2011)
  - Total: 53,382
  - Density: 95.058/km^{2} (246.20/sq mi)
- Demonym: Liberiano
- Time zone: UTC−06:00
- Postal code: 50101

Liberia (Spanish pronunciation: [li.ˈβe.ɾja]) is a district and the largest city in the Guanacaste Province of Costa Rica, 215 kilometres (134 mi) northwest of the national capital, San José. Part of the Liberia canton, it is a major center of the country's tourism industry.

Liberia has been nicknamed la ciudad blanca (the white city) due to the white gravel that was once used to make the city's roads and the whitewashed colonial houses that used to make up a large part of the city.

== History ==
Modern-day Liberia was founded as a hermitage without any legal or formal act of foundation on 4 September, 1769. It was in a strategic location where the roads from the towns of Rivas, Bagaces, and Nicoya met. The hermitage was used primarily as a place of rest by travelers. The area's giant guanacaste trees provided shade for travelers and livestock, and over time the area became known as Guanacaste (El Poblado de Guanacaste).

The settlement itself shares a history with Nicaragua and Costa Rica. In 1812, the Cortes of Cádiz created a single autonomous province covering Nicaragua and Costa Rica, with its capital in León. Nicaragua and Costa Rica achieved independence from Spain on 15 September, 1821 after the Spanish defeat in the Mexican War of Independence. After the short-lived First Mexican Empire (1821–1823), Costa Rica (considered a minor provincial outpost at the time) became part of the newly formed Federal Republic of Central America in 1823. The Partido de Nicoya (Nicoya's Party) served as an administrative unit for the Federal Republic of Central America. The Partido de Nicoya comprised much of the territory that today is the province of Guanacaste, Costa Rica. Most of the area, such as the settlements of Nicoya and Santa Cruz, held economic ties to Costa Rican territory such as the growing port of Puntarenas. The settlement of Guanacaste (modern day Liberia), on the other hand, held closer economic ties to Nicaraguan territory like the town of Rivas.

Under the leadership of the villages of Nicoya and Santa Cruz, the Partido de Nicoya voted to annex themselves to Costa Rica on 25 July, 1824.

The inhabitants of Guanacaste (modern day Liberia) chose to continue to be part of Nicaragua in 1824. In 1826, after years of dispute, the congress of the Federal Republic of Central America added Guanacaste (modern day Liberia) to Costa Rica.

The village of Guanacaste grew in importance and gradually overtook Nicoya as the area's most important settlement. On 23 July 1831, Guanacaste was renamed Villa de Guanacaste. On 3 September 1836, it was renamed Ciudad de Guanacaste.

In 1838, after the Federal Republic of Central America began to dissolve, Costa Rica formally withdrew and proclaimed itself an independent country. On 7 December 1848 Costa Rica divided its national territory into provinces, cantons, and districts. The territory encompassing Nicoya, Bagaces, Santa Cruz, Guanacaste (modern day Liberia), and Cañas became part of the newly formed province of Guanacaste.

On 30 May 1854, a government decree changed the name of the City of Guanacaste (Ciudad de Guanacaste) to the City of Liberia (Ciudad de Liberia). The name of the province of Guanacaste was changed to Moracia in honor of then Costa Rican president Juan Rafael Mora Porras.

In August 1859, Juan Rafael Mora Porras was overthrown in a coup d'état orchestrated by Jose Maria Montealegre. On 20 June 1860, during Montealegre's presidency, the province's name was switched back from Moracia to Guanacaste. Montealegre kept the name City of Liberia but saw it unfit to keep a province named after a political enemy.

Today, the Annexation of Guanacaste is celebrated annually on 25 July. Liberia holds a festival with folk dances, parades, cattle shows, local food, and other local traditions. Music is a big part of the festival and the traditional "marimba" is widely heard. A parade takes place in the centre of the city at which children wear masks and costumes.

Liberia's importance continued to grow and it became a major center for agriculture and livestock. The construction of the Pan-American Highway increased its importance and the commerce through the city. By the late 20th century, Liberia had become a major stopping point for tourists traveling to the Pacific Coast beaches of Guanacaste.

Today Liberia and the province of Guanacaste accept 25 July 1824 as their annexation day to Costa Rica.

== Geography ==
Liberia has an area of 563.57 km^{2} and an elevation of 144 metres.

== Demographics ==
Historical population
Census	Pop.	±% p.a.
1883	1,710	—
1892	2,226	+2.97%
1927	3,161	+1.01%
1950	4,597	+1.64%
1963	10,217	+6.34%
1973	16,823	+5.11%
1984	22,525	+2.69%
2000	39,242	+3.53%
2011	53,382	+2.84%
2022	65,922	+1.94%
Source: Instituto Nacional de Estadística y Censos; Centro Centroamericano de Población

At the 2011 census, Liberia had a population of 53,382. It had a population of 56,899 in 2013.

== Summary ==
With more than 50,000 inhabitants, Liberia is the regional hub of the Costa Rican northwest. The city center features a modern church, as many Costa Rican towns do, facing a plaza surrounded by locally owned shops and restaurants. Every July, Liberia holds an expo celebrating the annexation of Guanacaste Province on 25 July, 1824.

Located in the heart of Liberia, the Museo de Guanacaste represents the civility of Costa Rica and the abolition of the military. The Museo de Guanacaste portrays many of the local and national artists. Volunteers come from both internationally and locally to help restore the location and preserve the cultural heritage.

Tourists pass through Liberia en route to Pacific Coast beaches such as Playa del Coco, Playa Hermosa, Playa Tamarindo or the Papagayo Peninsula. An African safari attraction or zoo called "Africa Mia" is 4 kilometers south of town. The Museo de Sabanero is also in Liberia.

Rincón de la Vieja Volcano National Park is just northeast of Liberia. Volcanic hot springs, bubbling clay pots, and numerous waterfalls and rivers are along the park's many kilometres of hiking trails. Hot springs are southeast of Liberia along the west slopes of Miravalles volcano.

== Transportation ==
=== Road transportation ===
The district is covered by the following road routes:

- National Route 1
- National Route 21
- National Route 918

=== Airport ===
The Daniel Oduber Quirós International Airport is 13 kilometres (8 miles) west of the city, following the road to Nicoya. This is the second international airport in the country, after the Juan Santamaría International Airport in San José, and serves a variety of cities in the United States and Canada, as well as London and Amsterdam.

Liberia Airport is very close to many beaches from Guanacaste province, such as Tamarindo, Nosara, Sámara, Carrillo, Playa del Coco, Montezuma, Malpaís, and Santa Teresa.

The Liberia River bears the same name as the town.

== Sports ==
Municipal Liberia is the city's major football team, having spent almost 10 years in the Costa Rican Primera División after winning promotion in 2001. They play their home games in the Estadio Edgardo Baltodano Briceño.

== Climate ==
The city typically has a noticeable dry season. According to the Köppen Climate Classification system, Liberia has a tropical savanna climate, abbreviated Aw on climate maps.

Climate data for Liberia, Costa Rica
Month	Jan	Feb	Mar	Apr	May	Jun	Jul	Aug	Sep	Oct	Nov	Dec	Year
Mean daily maximum °C (°F)	33.4 (92.1)	34.4 (93.9)	35.4 (95.7)	35.9 (96.6)	33.9 (93.0)	32.0 (89.6)	32.1 (89.8)	32.1 (89.8)	31.3 (88.3)	30.9 (87.6)	31.6 (88.9)	32.5 (90.5)	33.0 (91.4)
Daily mean °C (°F)	25.8 (78.4)	26.7 (80.1)	27.3 (81.1)	28.5 (83.3)	28.7 (83.7)	28.0 (82.4)	27.6 (81.7)	27.0 (80.6)	27.2 (81.0)	27.0 (80.6)	26.2 (79.2)	25.7 (78.3)	27.1 (80.8)
Mean daily minimum °C (°F)	20.7 (69.3)	21.1 (70.0)	21.6 (70.9)	22.7 (72.9)	23.4 (74.1)	23.2 (73.8)	22.8 (73.0)	22.6 (72.7)	22.4 (72.3)	22.3 (72.1)	21.5 (70.7)	21.0 (69.8)	22.1 (71.8)
Average rainfall mm (inches)	1.3 (0.05)	1.6 (0.06)	4.1 (0.16)	23.9 (0.94)	194.1 (7.64)	245.6 (9.67)	153.3 (6.04)	209.4 (8.24)	346.3 (13.63)	310.0 (12.20)	98.2 (3.87)	12.3 (0.48)	1,600.1 (62.98)
Average rainy days (≥ 1.0 mm)	0	0	0	1	9	14	10	12	17	16	6	2	87
Average relative humidity (%)	65.3	62.2	60.5	62.0	73.2	81.9	78.4	80.9	85.4	86.1	80.4	72.1	74.0
Average dew point °C (°F)	18.8 (65.8)	18.9 (66.0)	19.0 (66.2)	20.5 (68.9)	23.4 (74.1)	24.6 (76.3)	23.5 (74.3)	23.4 (74.1)	24.5 (76.1)	24.5 (76.1)	22.6 (72.7)	20.3 (68.5)	22.0 (71.6)
Mean monthly sunshine hours	297.6	276.9	303.8	267.0	204.6	168.0	186.0	182.9	159.0	170.5	204.0	260.4	2,680.7
Mean daily sunshine hours	9.6	9.8	9.8	8.9	6.6	5.6	6.0	5.9	5.3	5.5	6.8	8.4	7.4
Percentage possible sunshine	83	83	81	72	52	44	47	47	42	46	59	73	61
Source: Instituto Meteorologico Nacional (precipitation 1957–2012, temperatures 1977–2013, sun 1976–2012, humidity 1976–2013) Weather Spark

In Liberia, as in the rest of Costa Rica outside the perennially humid Caribbean coast, there are essentially two seasons, dry and wet. The dry season runs from November to April, when the temperature is high and very little rain falls. The wet season runs from May to October, when it often rains throughout the country. Liberia is one of the drier cities in Guanacaste. Even in wet seasons, it is much drier than the rest of Costa Rica.

The most temperate time of year is toward the start of the dry season, when the climate is only beginning to get warm and precipitation has decreased. The dry season gets quite hot and sometimes becomes uncomfortable for those unaccustomed to such dry heat.

== Notable people ==
- José Carlos Sáenz Esquivel
- Cristian Gamboa
- Levi Vega Martinez
