= Río Cañas (Aguada, Puerto Rico) =

River of Puerto Rico

Coordinates: 18.3882802°N 67.1404582°W

Location
- Commonwealth: Puerto Rico
- Municipality: Aguada

Physical characteristics
- Source
  - location: Cerro Piñales in Lagunas, Aguada
- Mouth
  - location: Culebrinas River in Mamey, Aguada

The Cañas River (Spanish: Río Cañas) is a tributary of the Culebrinas River that flows through the municipality of Aguada in northwestern Puerto Rico.

== See also ==
- List of rivers of Puerto Rico
