= Naranjo, Aguada, Puerto Rico =

Barrio of Puerto Rico

Naranjo
- Barrio
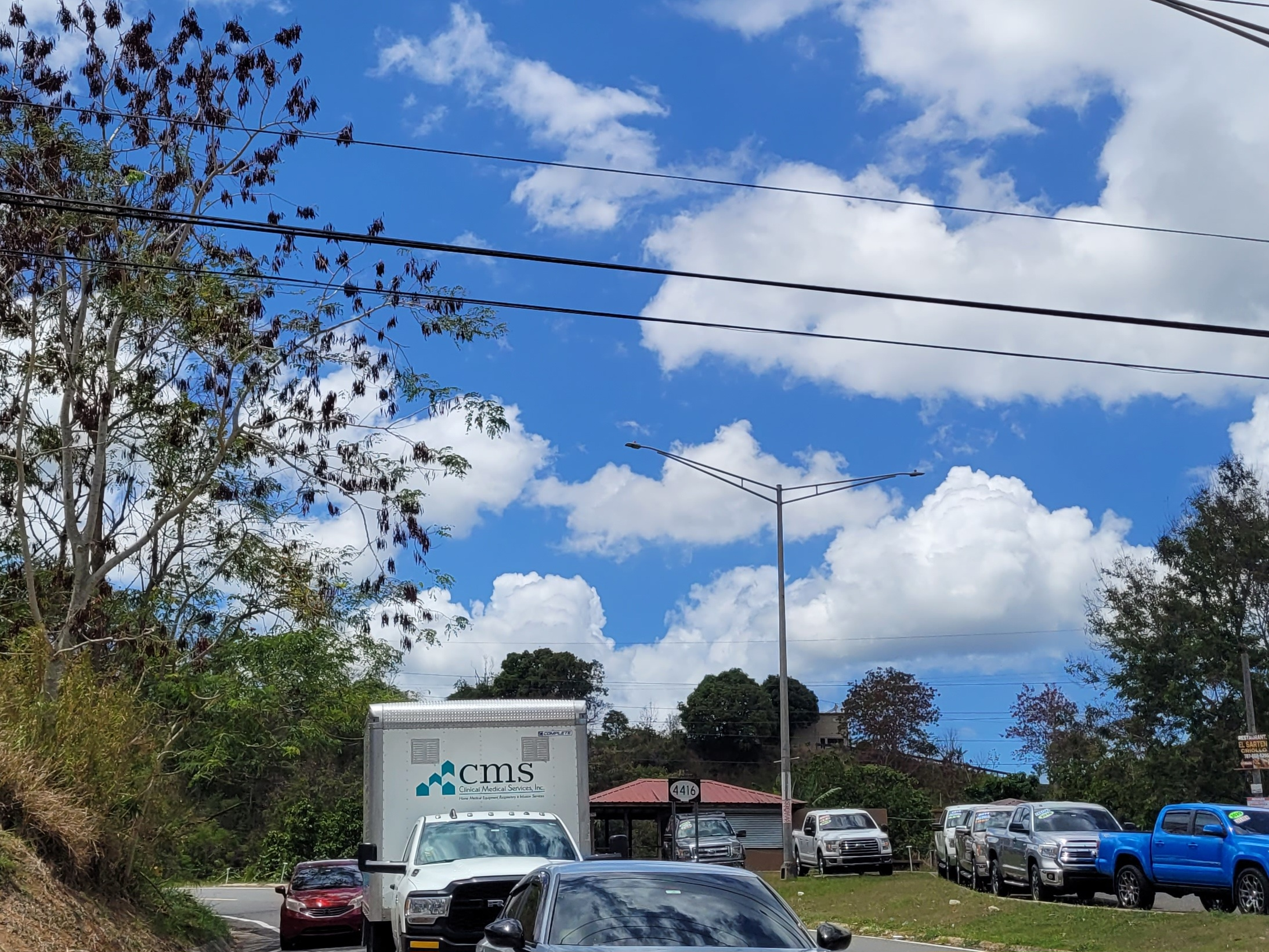
- Puerto Rico Highway 4416 in Naranjo

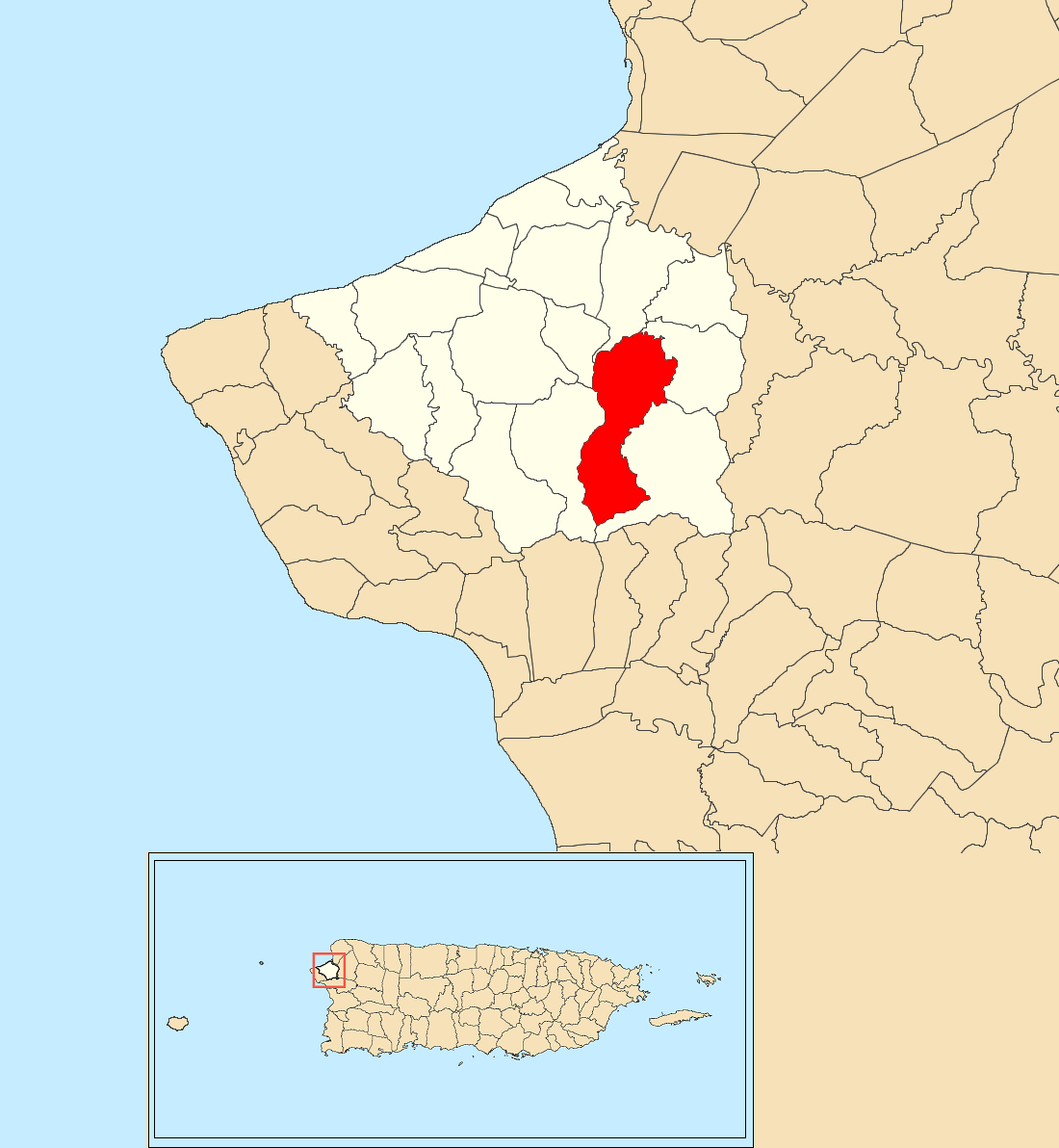
- Location of Naranjo within the municipality of Aguada shown in red

- Location of Puerto Rico
- Coordinates: 18°20′43″N 67°09′28″W
- Commonwealth: Puerto Rico
- Municipality: Aguada

Area
  - Total: 2.72 sq mi (7.0 km^{2})
  - Land: 2.72 sq mi (7.0 km^{2})
  - Water: 0.00 sq mi (0 km^{2})
- Elevation: 269 ft (82 m)

Population (2010)
  - Total: 3,292
  - Density: 1,210.3/sq mi (467.3/km^{2})
- Source: 2010 Census
- Time zone: UTC−4 (AST)
- ZIP Code: 00602
- Area codes: 787, 939

Naranjo is a barrio in the municipality of Aguada, Puerto Rico. Its population in 2010 was 3,292.

== History ==
Naranjo was in Spain's gazetteers until Puerto Rico was ceded by Spain in the aftermath of the Spanish–American War under the terms of the Treaty of Paris of 1898 and became an unincorporated territory of the United States. In 1899, the United States Department of War conducted a census of Puerto Rico finding that the population of Naranjo barrio was 923.

Historical population
| Census | Pop. | Note | %± |
|---|---|---|---|
| 1900 | 923 | | — |
| 1910 | 1,018 | | 10.3% |
| 1920 | 1,078 | | 5.9% |
| 1930 | 1,142 | | 5.9% |
| 1940 | 1,203 | | 5.3% |
| 1950 | 1,599 | | 32.9% |
| 1960 | 1,396 | | −12.7% |
| 1970 | 2,089 | | 49.6% |
| 1980 | 2,618 | | 25.3% |
| 1990 | 3,087 | | 17.9% |
| 2000 | 3,724 | | 20.6% |
| 2010 | 3,292 | | −11.6% |
U.S. Decennial Census; 1899 (shown as 1900) 1910-1930; 1930-1950 1960 1980-2000 2010

== Sectors ==
Barrios (which are like minor civil divisions) in turn are further subdivided into smaller local populated place areas/units called sectores (sectors in English). The types of sectores may vary, from normally sector to urbanización to reparto to barriada to residencial, among others.

The following sectors are in Naranjo barrio:

Sector 3 Copas, Sector Berto Vargas, Sector Ceferino Acevedo, Sector Cuchilla, Sector El Coquí, Sector El Lirio, Sector El Manantial, Sector Foro Soto, Sector González, Sector Guillermo Matías, Sector Juan Tita, Sector La Cadena, Sector Lencho Pérez, Sector Leo Flora, Sector Militar, Sector Mingo Echevarría, Sector Moncho Pérez, Sector Naranjo Abajo, Sector Naranjo Arriba, and Sector Tano Villarrubia.

Part of the Luyando community is in Naranjo.

== See also ==
- List of communities in Puerto Rico
- List of barrios and sectors of Aguada, Puerto Rico
