= Guayabo, Aguada, Puerto Rico =

Barrio of Puerto Rico

Guayabo
- Barrio
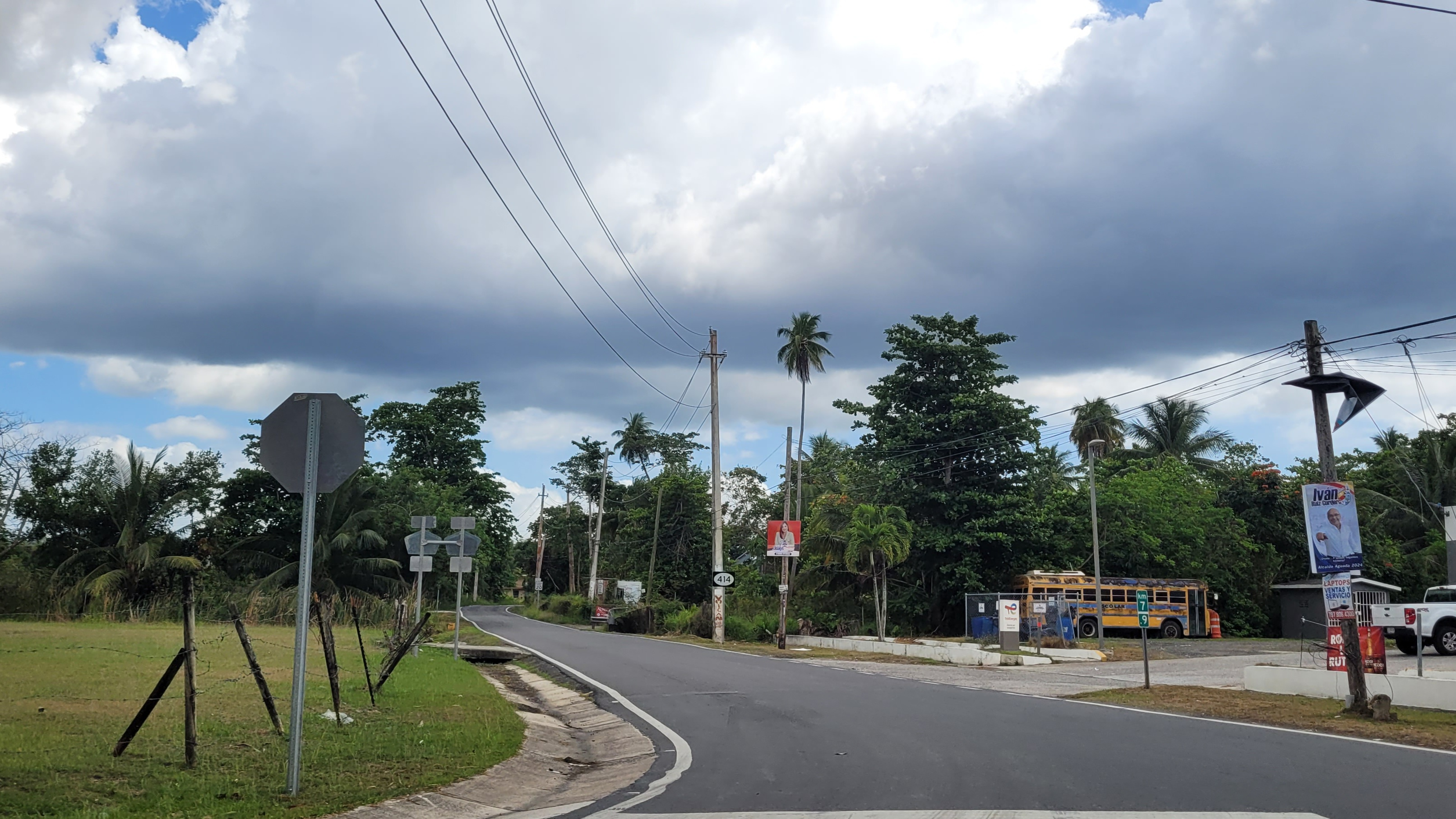
- Puerto Rico Highway 414 in Guayabo

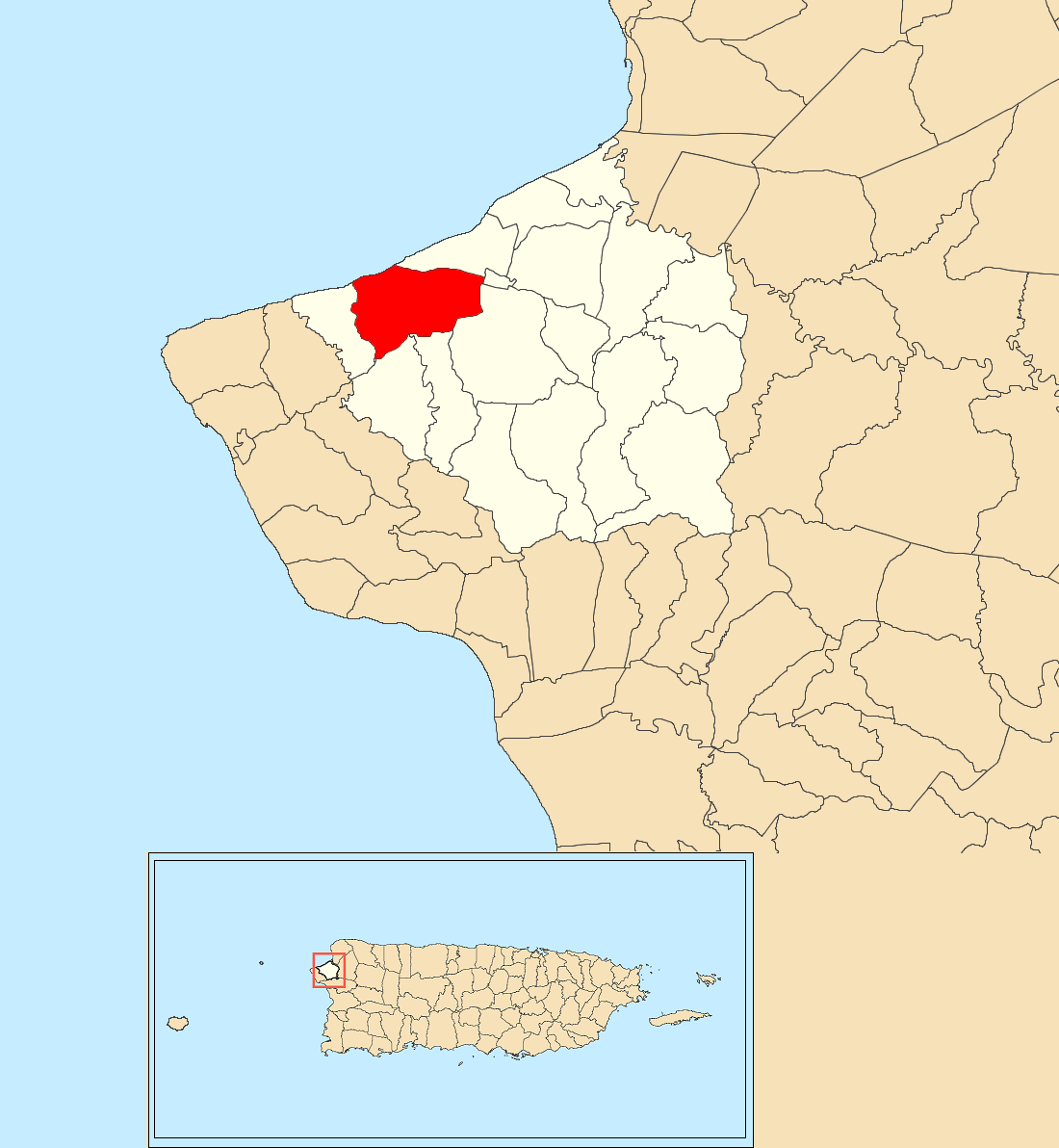
- Location of Guayabo within the municipality of Aguada shown in red

- Location of Puerto Rico
- Coordinates: 18°22′28″N 67°12′32″W
- Commonwealth: Puerto Rico
- Municipality: Aguada

Area
  - Total: 2.42 sq mi (6.3 km^{2})
  - Land: 2.20 sq mi (5.7 km^{2})
  - Water: 0.22 sq mi (0.57 km^{2})
- Elevation: 10 ft (3.0 m)

Population (2010)
  - Total: 3,273
  - Density: 1,494.5/sq mi (577.0/km^{2})
- Source: 2010 Census
- Time zone: UTC−4 (AST)
- ZIP Code: 00602
- Area codes: 787, 939

Guayabo is a barrio in the municipality of Aguada, Puerto Rico. Its population in 2010 was 3,273.

== History ==
Guayabo was in Spain's gazetteers until Puerto Rico was ceded by Spain in the aftermath of the Spanish–American War under the terms of the Treaty of Paris of 1898 and became an unincorporated territory of the United States. In 1899, the United States Department of War conducted a census of Puerto Rico finding that the combined population of Guayabo, Cruces and Río Grande barrios was 1,533.

Historical population
Census	Pop.	Note	%±
1910	788		—
1920	888		12.7%
1930	823		−7.3%
1940	1,007		22.4%
1950	970		−3.7%
1960	825		−14.9%
1970	0		−100.0%
1980	2,108		—
1990	2,680		27.1%
2000	2,961		10.5%
2010	3,273		10.5%
U.S. Decennial Census; 1900 (N/A) 1910-1930; 1930-1950 1960 1980-2000 2010

== Sectors ==
Barrios (which are, in contemporary times, roughly comparable to minor civil divisions) in turn are further subdivided into smaller local populated place areas/units called sectores (sectors in English). The types of sectores may vary, from normally sector to urbanización to reparto to barriada to residencial, among others.

The following sectors are in Guayabo barrio:

Avenida Nativo Alers, Condominio Mar Azul, Condominio Ocean View Castle, Extensión Casualidad, Sector El Palmar, Sector El Túnel, Sector Hacienda El Palmar, Sector Juan Cardona, Sector La Mora, Sector Las Cruces, Sector Miguel A. Ruíz, Sector Pancho Agudo, Sector Pascual Muñoz, Sector Silva, Tramo Carretera 115, Urbanización El Palmar, and Urbanización Villas del Palmar.

In Guayabo barrio is part of the Aguada urban zone.

== See also ==
- List of communities in Puerto Rico
- List of barrios and sectors of Aguada, Puerto Rico
