= Church of San Francisco de Asís (Aguada) =

Coordinates: 18°22′47″N 67°11′18″W

Parroquia San Francisco de Asís de la Aguada
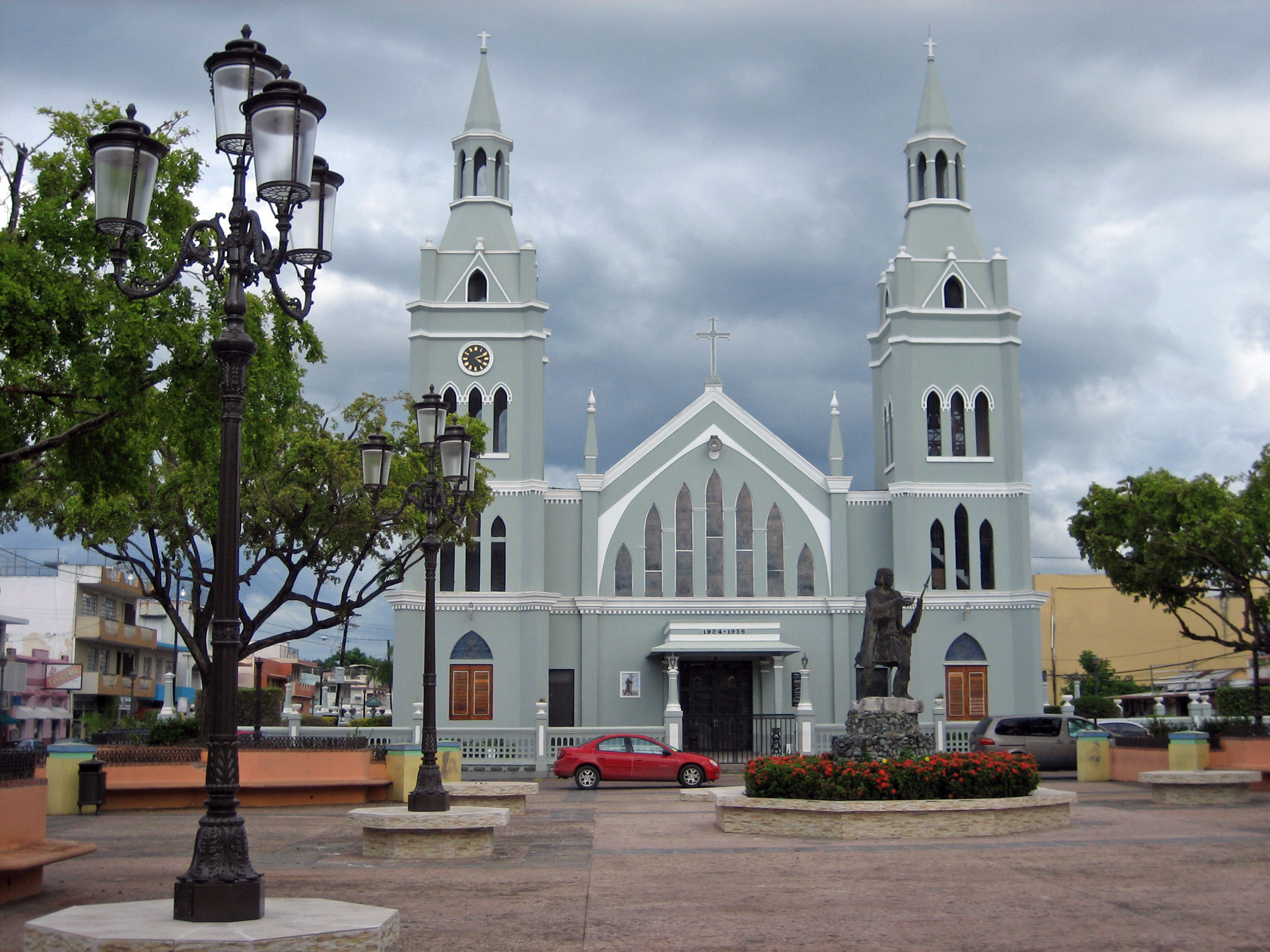
- Church of San Francisco de Asís in the Plaza de Aguada
- Location: Aguada, Puerto Rico
- Denomination: Roman Catholic

History
- Status: Parish

Architecture
- Completed: 1926

Administration
- Diocese: Diocese of Mayagüez

The Church of San Francisco de Asís de la Aguada (Spanish: Iglesia San Francisco de Asís de la Aguada) is a parish of the Catholic Church in Aguada, Puerto Rico. It is located on the eastern end of the Plaza de Aguada (the main town square) in downtown Aguada.

== History ==
The Parish of Aguada was officially established in 1692 and it has belonged to four different dioceses throughout its history. Although the current church dates to the early 20th century, different wooden church buildings have occupied the space. The previous structure was destroyed during the 1918 Puerto Rico earthquake, The church was designed by architects Antonio Martínez and José Lazaro, and construction took place between the years 1919 and 1926. The church is currently undergoing extensive renovations.

== See also ==
- Catholic Church in the United States
- Roman Catholic Diocese of Mayagüez
