= Guanábano, Aguada, Puerto Rico =

Barrio of Puerto Rico

Guanábano
- Barrio
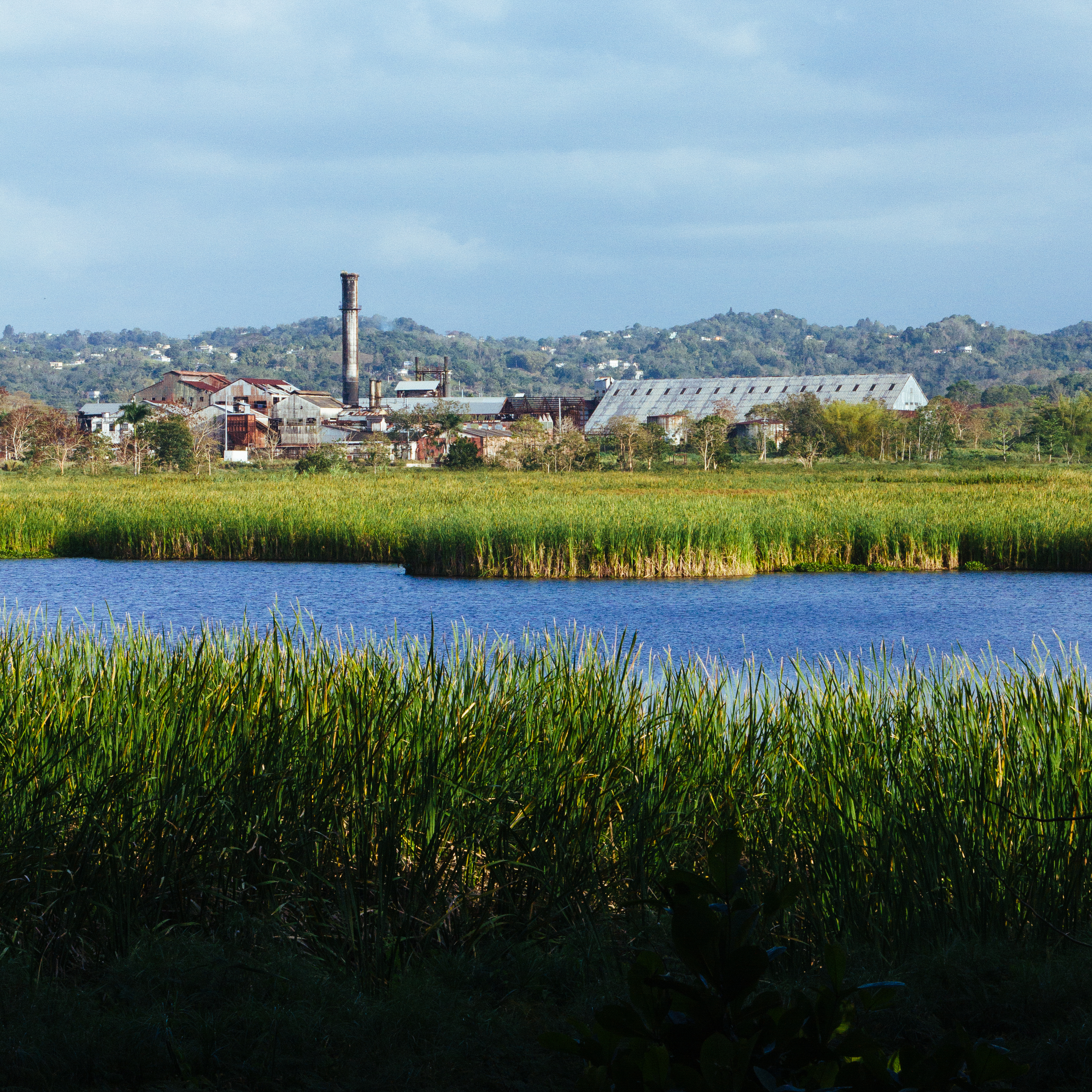
- Central Coloso

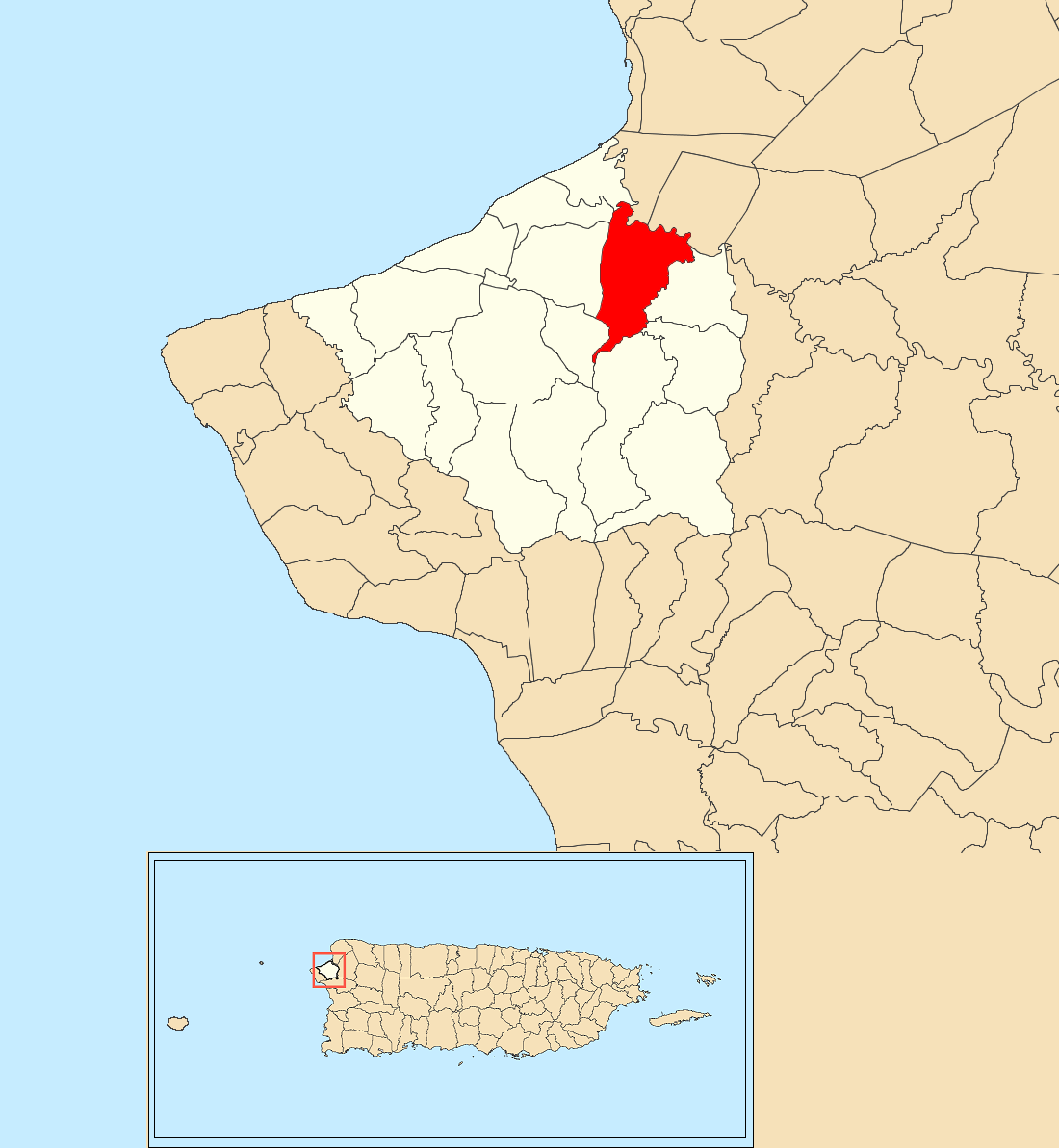
- Location of Guanábano within the municipality of Aguada shown in red

- Location of Puerto Rico
- Coordinates: 18°22′52″N 67°09′19″W
- Commonwealth: Puerto Rico
- Municipality: Aguada

Area
  - Total: 2.06 sq mi (5.3 km^{2})
  - Land: 2.04 sq mi (5.3 km^{2})
  - Water: 0.02 sq mi (0.052 km^{2})
- Elevation: 33 ft (10 m)

Population (2010)
  - Total: 749
  - Density: 367.2/sq mi (141.8/km^{2})
- Source: 2010 Census
- Time zone: UTC−4 (AST)
- ZIP Code: 00602
- Area codes: 787, 939

Guanábano is a barrio in the municipality of Aguada, Puerto Rico. Its population in 2010 was 749.

== History ==
Guanábano was in Spain's gazetteers until Puerto Rico was ceded by Spain in the aftermath of the Spanish–American War under the terms of the Treaty of Paris of 1898 and became an unincorporated territory of the United States. In 1899, the United States Department of War conducted a census of Puerto Rico finding that the combined population of Guanábano (spelled Guanábanas) and Mal Paso barrios was 723.

== Puente de Coloso ==
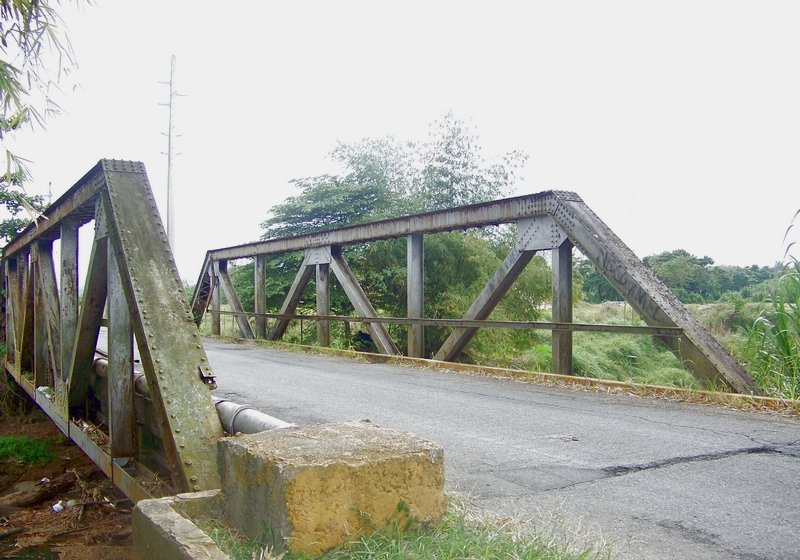
Puente de Coloso in Guanábano

Puente de Coloso, a bridge used during the height of sugarcane production in Puerto Rico, is located in Guanábano over the Culebrinas River.

Historical population
Census	Pop.	Note	%±
1910	282		—
1920	325		15.2%
1930	531		63.4%
1940	781		47.1%
1950	701		−10.2%
1960	1,305		86.2%
1970	891		−31.7%
1980	787		−11.7%
1990	889		13.0%
2000	902		1.5%
2010	749		−17.0%
U.S. Decennial Census; 1900 (N/A) 1910-1930; 1930-1950 1960 1980-2000 2010

== Sectors ==
Barrios (which are, in contemporary times, roughly comparable to minor civil divisions) in turn are further subdivided into smaller local populated place areas/units called sectores (sectors in English). The types of sectores may vary, from normally sector to urbanización to reparto to barriada to residencial, among others.

The following sectors are in Guanábano barrio:

Parcelas Luyando, Sector Beníquez, Sector Coloso, Sector David Miranda, Sector Las Bimbas, and Sector Militar.

In Guanábano barrio is part of the Luyando community.

== See also ==
- List of communities in Puerto Rico
- List of barrios and sectors of Aguada, Puerto Rico
