= Espinar, Aguada, Puerto Rico =

Barrio of Puerto Rico

Espinar
- Barrio
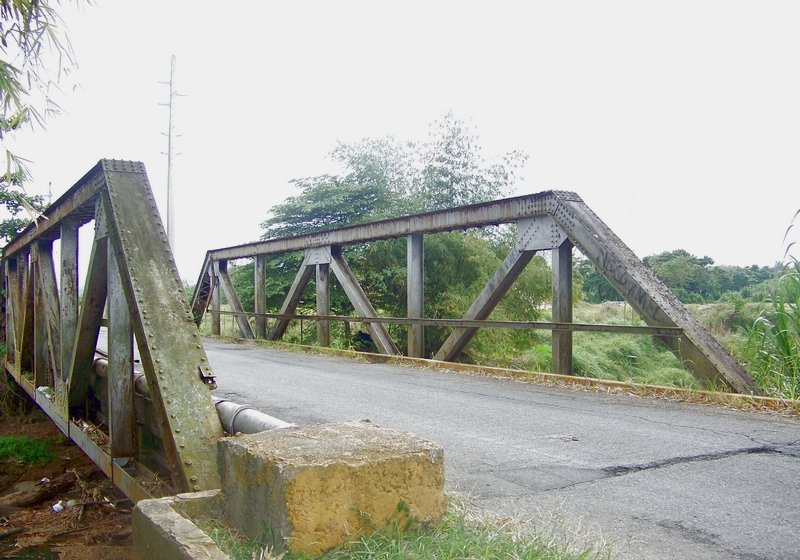
- Puente de Coloso

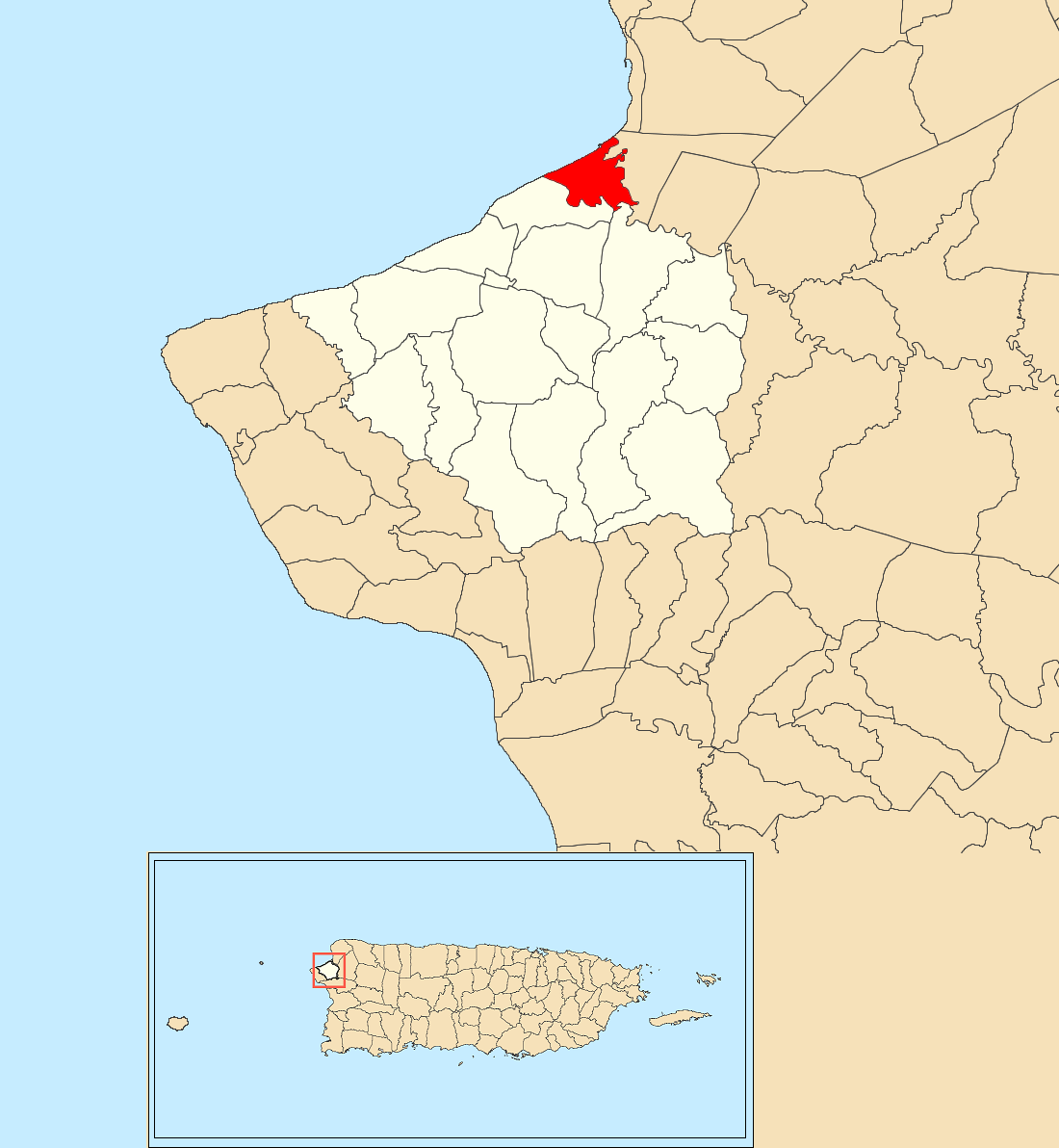
- Location of Espinar within the municipality of Aguada shown in red

- Location of Puerto Rico
- Coordinates: 18°24′28″N 67°09′46″W
- Commonwealth: Puerto Rico
- Municipality: Aguada

Area
  - Total: 1.23 sq mi (3.2 km^{2})
  - Land: 0.86 sq mi (2.2 km^{2})
  - Water: 0.37 sq mi (0.96 km^{2})
- Elevation: 0 ft (0 m)

Population (2010)
  - Total: 1,281
  - Density: 1,489.5/sq mi (575.1/km^{2})
- Source: 2010 Census
- Time zone: UTC−4 (AST)
- ZIP Code: 00602
- Area codes: 787, 939

Espinar is a barrio in the municipality of Aguada, Puerto Rico. Its population in 2010 was 1,281.

== History ==
Espinar is located near the Culebrinas River and is named after a Franciscan priest who founded a convent there. In 1529, Espinar and other priests were assassinated by the indigenous Island Caribs. Their deaths resulted in a hermitage being built for honoring their martyrdom. Later on, Franciscan priests erected a new church over the ruins of the first and, to this day, religious services are held there.

Espinar was in Spain's gazetteers until Puerto Rico was ceded by Spain in the aftermath of the Spanish–American War under the terms of the Treaty of Paris of 1898 and became an unincorporated territory of the United States. In 1899, the United States Department of War conducted a census of Puerto Rico finding that the population of Espinar and Carrizal barrios was 1,010.

== Puente de Coloso ==
The Puente de Coloso, a bridge used during the height of sugarcane production in Puerto Rico is located near Espinar.

Historical population
| Census | Pop. | Note | %± |
|---|---|---|---|
| 1910 | 530 | | — |
| 1920 | 576 | | 8.7% |
| 1930 | 510 | | −11.5% |
| 1940 | 649 | | 27.3% |
| 1950 | 790 | | 21.7% |
| 1960 | 1,244 | | 57.5% |
| 1970 | 1,391 | | 11.8% |
| 1980 | 1,587 | | 14.1% |
| 1990 | 1,378 | | −13.2% |
| 2000 | 1,569 | | 13.9% |
| 2010 | 1,281 | | −18.4% |
U.S. Decennial Census; 1900 (N/A) 1910-1930; 1930-1950 1960 1980-2000 2010

== Sectors ==
Barrios (which are, in contemporary times, roughly comparable to minor civil divisions) in turn are further subdivided into smaller local populated place areas/units called sectores (sectors in English). The types of sectores may vary, from normally sector to urbanización to reparto to barriada to residencial, among others.

The following sectors are in Espinar barrio:

Brisas de Espinar (Solares), Parcelas Pastos Comunales, Sector El Caracol, Sector Hernández Ramírez, Sector Hoyo Frío, Sector La Playa, Sector Marcial, and Sector Río Culebrinas.

== See also ==
- List of communities in Puerto Rico
- List of barrios and sectors of Aguada, Puerto Rico
