= Cruces, Aguada, Puerto Rico =

Barrio of Puerto Rico

Cruces
- Barrio
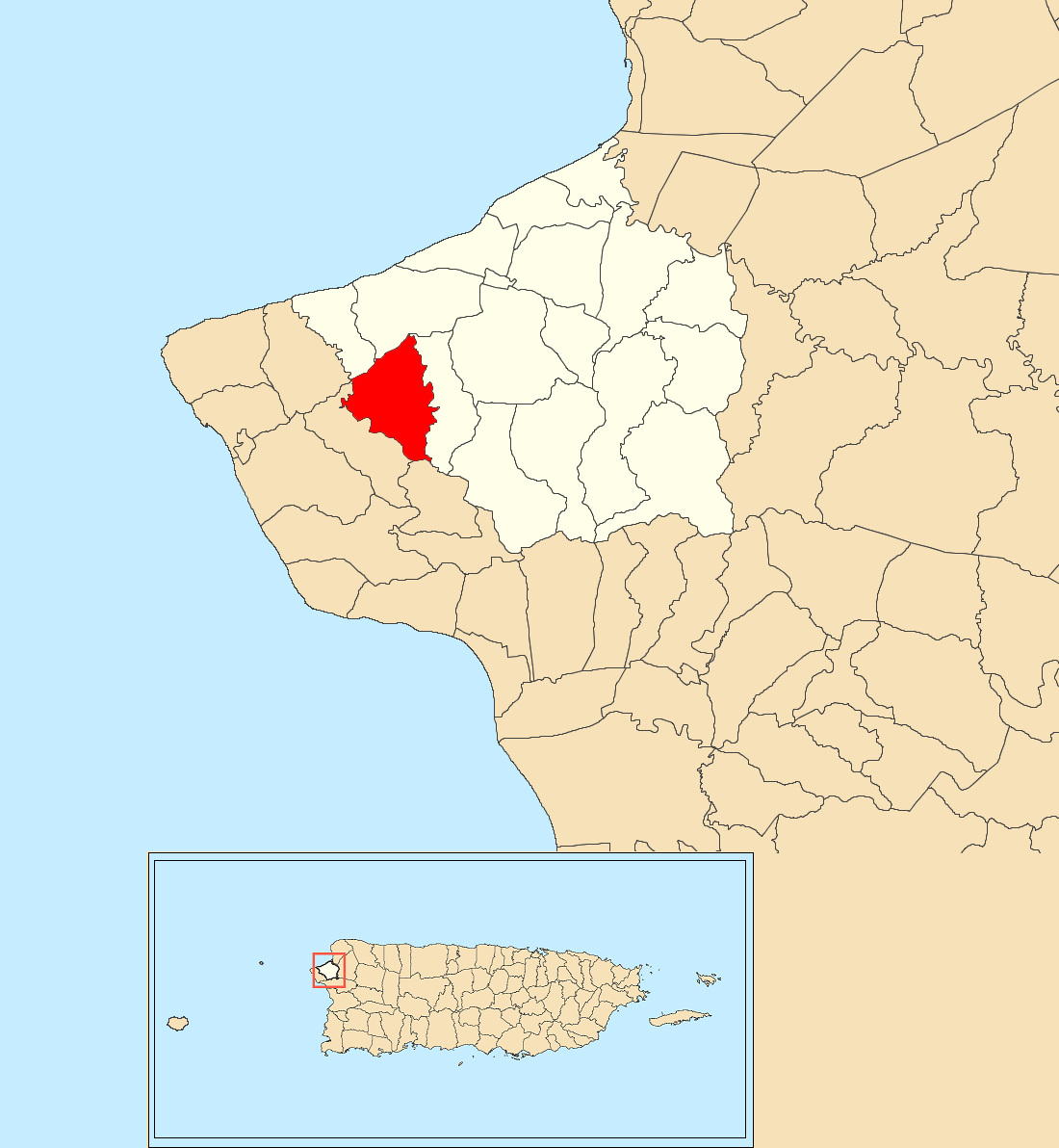
- Location of Cruces within the municipality of Aguada shown in red

- Location of Puerto Rico
- Coordinates: 18°21′03″N 67°12′48″W
- Commonwealth: Puerto Rico
- Municipality: Aguada

Area
  - Total: 1.78 sq mi (4.6 km^{2})
  - Land: 1.78 sq mi (4.6 km^{2})
  - Water: 0.00 sq mi (0 km^{2})
- Elevation: 151 ft (46 m)

Population (2010)
  - Total: 1,632
  - Density: 916.9/sq mi (354.0/km^{2})
- Source: 2010 Census
- Time zone: UTC−4 (AST)
- ZIP Code: 00602
- Area codes: 787, 939

Cruces is a barrio in the municipality of Aguada, Puerto Rico. Its population in 2010 was 1,632.

== History ==
Cruces was in Spain's gazetteers until Puerto Rico was ceded by Spain in the aftermath of the Spanish–American War under the terms of the Treaty of Paris of 1898 and became an unincorporated territory of the United States. In 1899, the United States Department of War conducted a census of Puerto Rico finding that the combined population of Cruces, Guayabo, and Río Grande barrios was 1,533.

Historical population
Census	Pop.	Note	%±
1910	520		—
1920	604		16.2%
1930	638		5.6%
1940	881		38.1%
1950	1,249		41.8%
1960	1,083		−13.3%
1970	821		−24.2%
1980	1,047		27.5%
1990	1,522		45.4%
2000	1,655		8.7%
2010	1,632		−1.4%
U.S. Decennial Census; 1900 (N/A) 1910-1930; 1930-1950 1960 1980-2000 2010

== Sectors ==
Barrios (which are, in contemporary times, roughly comparable to minor civil divisions) in turn are further subdivided into smaller local populated place areas/units called sectores (sectors in English). The types of sectores may vary, from normally sector to urbanización to reparto to barriada to residencial, among others.

The following sectors are in Cruces barrio:

Sector 4 Esquinas, Sector Chago Mero, Sector Chelo Matías, Sector Cruces, Sector El Calvario, Sector El Túnel, Sector Gelin Soto, Sector Goyito Muñiz, Sector Guillo Goyco, Sector Juan Cardona, Sector Juan Soto, Sector La Sombra, Sector Las Cruces, Sector Lino Morales, Sector Lino Ríos, Sector Muñoz, Sector Rito Ríos, Sector Rufino Pérez, and Sector Tildo López.

== See also ==
- List of communities in Puerto Rico
- List of barrios and sectors of Aguada, Puerto Rico
