= Aguada, Puerto Rico =

Town and municipality in Puerto Rico

Aguada Municipio de Aguada
- Town and Municipality
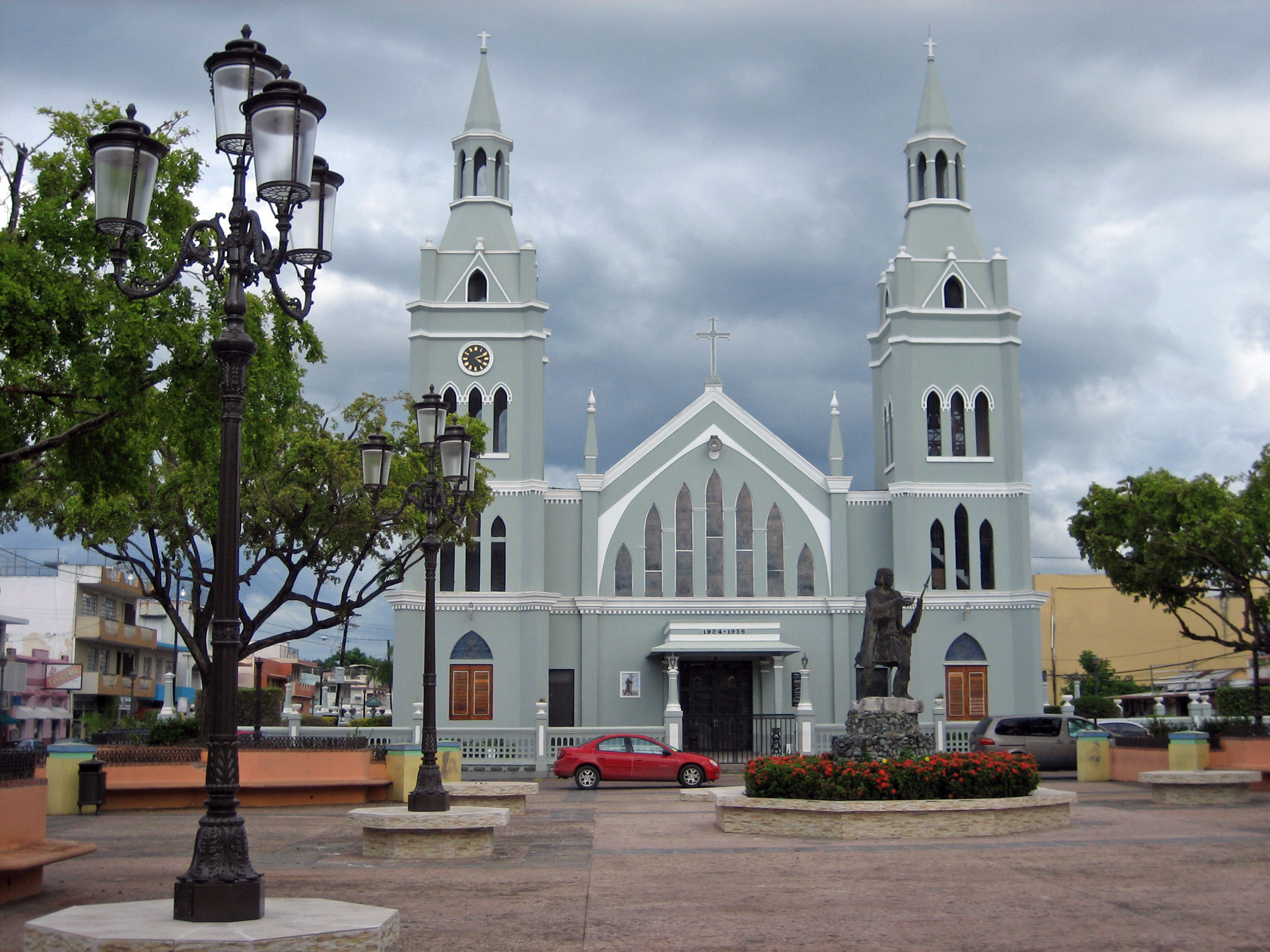
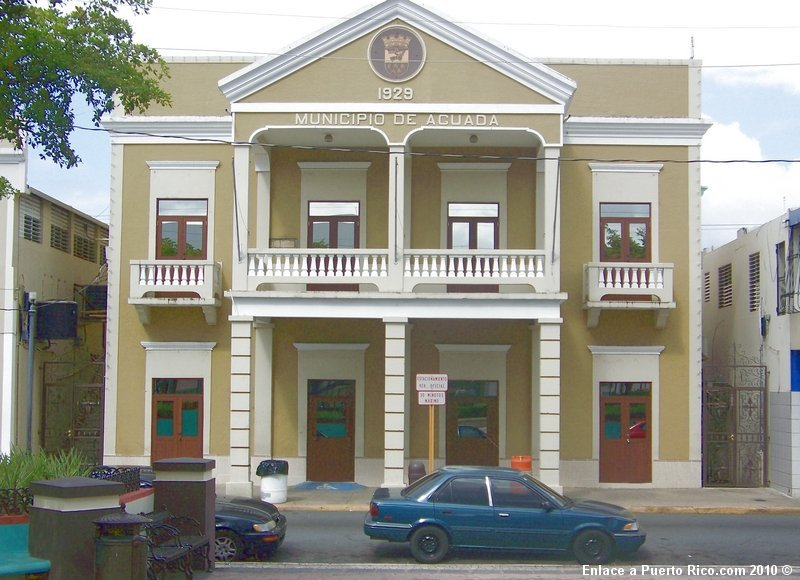
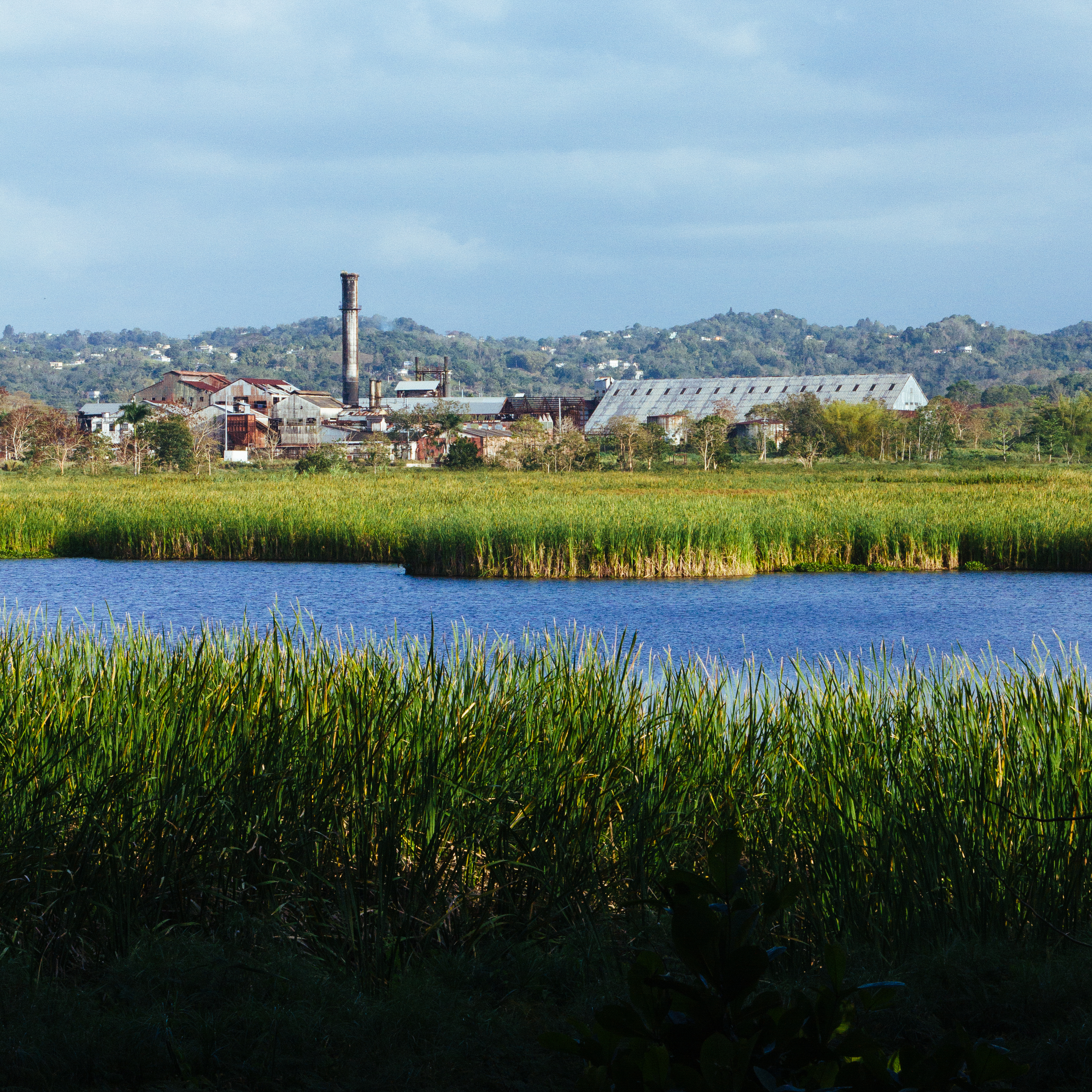
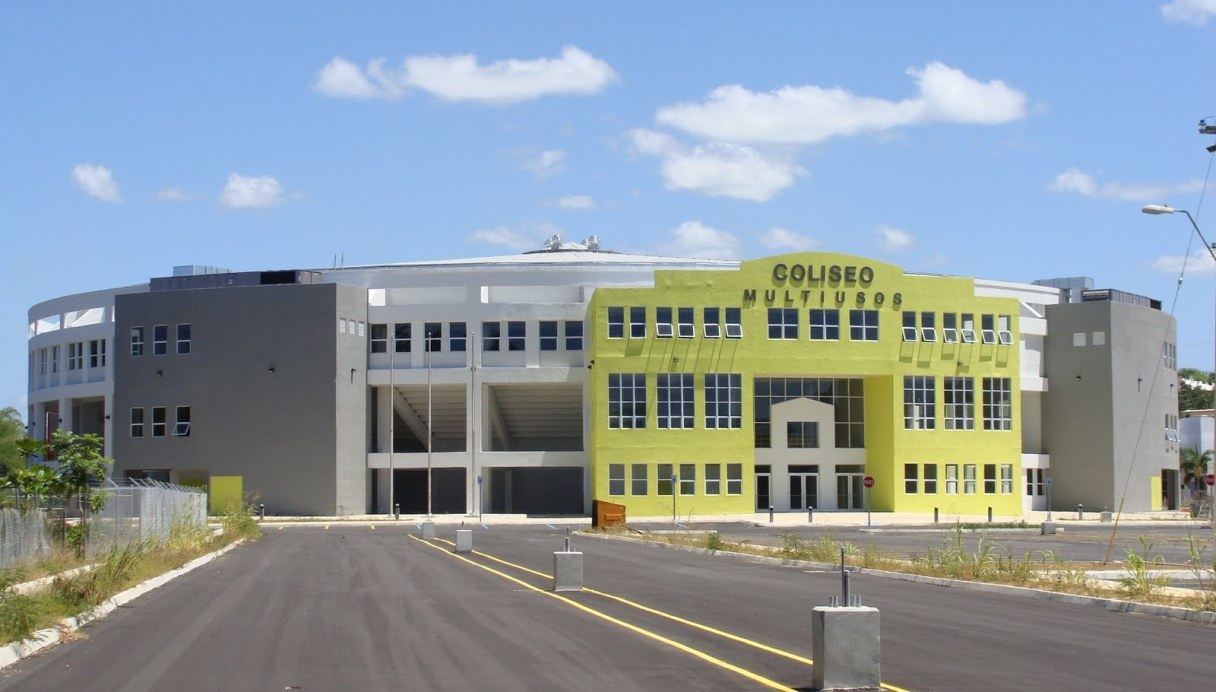
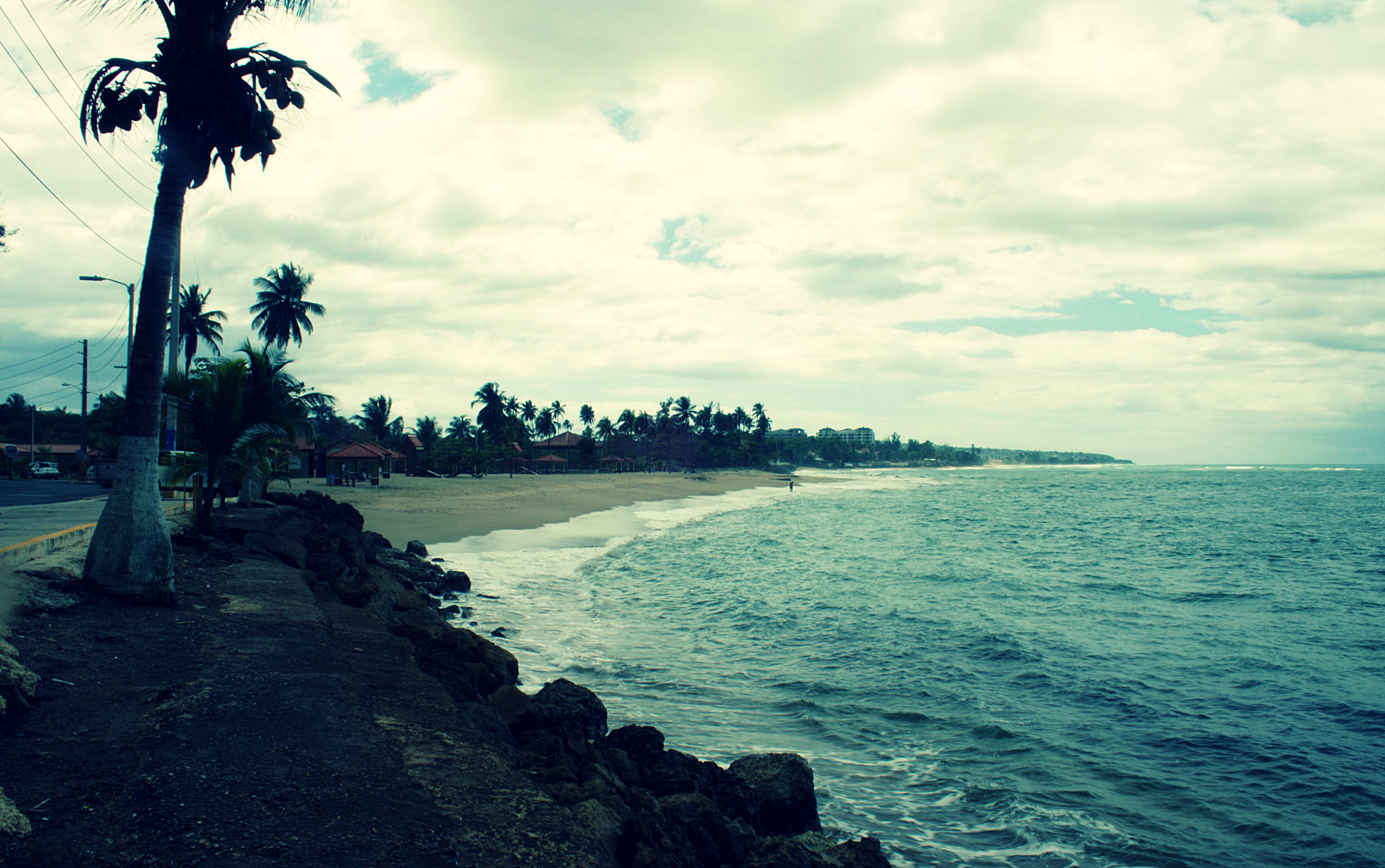
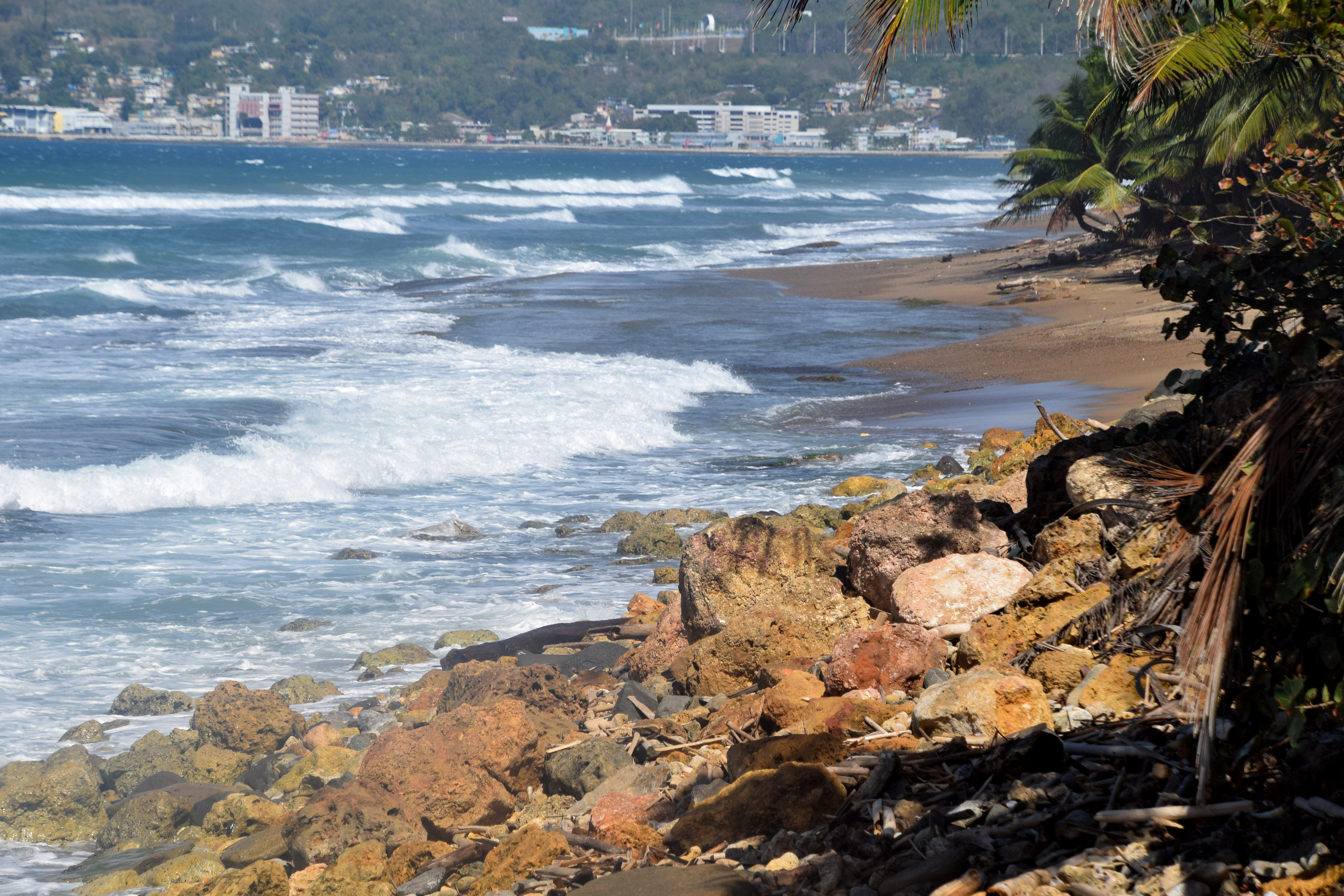
- Church of San Francisco Aguada City Hall Central Coloso Ismael Delgado Coliseum Pico Piedra Beach Espinar shoreline

- Flag Coat of arms
- Nicknames: "La Villa de Sotomayor", "Ciudad Del Descubrimiento", "Villa de San Francisco de Asís de la Aguada", "El Pueblo Playero", "La Ciudad del Vaticano"
- Anthem: "Muchos siglos han pasado"
- Map of Puerto Rico highlighting Aguada Municipality
- Coordinates: 18°22′46″N 67°11′18″W
- Sovereign state: United States
- Commonwealth: Puerto Rico
- First settled: May 20, 1510
- Founded: July 8, 1639
- Founder: Don Cristóbal de Sotomayor
- Barrios: 18 barrios: Aguada pueblo; Asomante; Atalaya; Carrizal; Cerro Gordo; Cruces; Espinar; Guanábano; Guaniquilla; Guayabo; Jagüey; Lagunas; Mal Paso; Mamey; Marías; Naranjo; Piedras Blancas; Río Grande

Government
  - Mayor: Christian Cortés (Popular Democratic Party (Puerto Rico))
  - Senatorial dist.: 4 – Mayagüez
  - Representative dist.: 18

Area
  - Total: 45.55 sq mi (118.0 km^{2})
  - Land: 30.93 sq mi (80.1 km^{2})
  - Water: 14.62 sq mi (37.9 km^{2}) 32%

Population (2020)
  - Total: 38,136
  - Estimate (2025): 37,319 ▼
  - Rank: 26th in the Puerto Rico
  - Density: 1,233/sq mi (476.1/km^{2})
- Demonym: Aguadeños
- Time zone: UTC−4 (AST)
- ZIP Code: 00602
- Area code: 787/939

Aguada (/əˈɡwɑːdə/; Spanish: [aˈɣwaða], locally [aˈwaða]), originally San Francisco de Asís de la Aguada, is a town and municipality of Puerto Rico, located in the northwestern coastal valley region bordering the Atlantic Ocean, east of Rincón, south of Aguadilla, west of Moca; and north of Añasco and Mayagüez. It is part of the Aguadilla-Isabela-San Sebastián Metropolitan Statistical Area. Aguada's population is spread over 17 barrios and Aguada Pueblo (the downtown area and the administrative center of the city).

== Etymology and nicknames ==
The name Aguada is a shortening of the town's original name San Francisco de Asís de la Aguada. The word aguada literally translates to "watery" or "watered down" from Spanish, possibly a reference to the town's strategic importance as a port in the Mona Passage and the Atlantic Ocean.

The municipality has many nicknames: La Villa de Sotomayor ("Sotomayor's Villa") is a reference to one of the town's Spanish founders, Cristóbal de Sotomayor; La Ciudad del Descubrimiento ("City of the Discovery") is a reference to the possibility that Christopher Columbus first landed in Puerto Rico at what is today the municipality's territory; El Pueblo Playero translates to "the beach town" and La Ciudad del Vaticano ("the Vatican's City") which references the town's early importance for Catholicism in the island.

== History ==
A Taíno settlement called Aymamón or Aymaymón was located close to the Culebrinas River prior to the arrival of the Spanish. Aguada Bay (Bahía de Aguada), today gazetted as Aguadilla Bay (Bahía de Aguada), in Aguada has popularly been recognized as the location where Christopher Columbus first landed in Puerto Rico during his second voyage on 19 November 1493. However, it is believed by most historians that Añasco Bay (Bahía de Añasco) in the neighboring municipality of Añasco was the place of Columbus’ first landing and stay of two days in Puerto Rico before continuing to La Navidad, first European settlement in the Americas, in Hispaniola.

In July 1510, Cristóbal de Sotomayor received control of the area from Juan Ponce de León and founded the town Villa de Sotomayor. However, he was executed and the settlement was burned down by the local Taínos during the Taíno Rebellion of 1511. That same year, the Spanish crown ordered a monastery be established in Puerto Rico, and the Espinar Hermitage (Ermita de Espinar) was founded in what is today the Espinar barrio of Aguada. As the Spanish Crown began to colonize the Caribbean area, they wanted to continue converting the natives to Catholicism. The name of the area was then changed to San Francisco de Asís de la Aguada, in honor of the Franciscan friars in charge of establishing the hermitage, now a monastery. The monastery was officially finished in 1516. In 1526, King Charles I of Spain officially approved the foundation of the new Aguada settlement. However, in 1529, Taínos attacked the monastery, killing the friars and burning the new settlement down. A new iteration of the Franciscan monastery was re-established sometime during the second half of the 16th-century but it was later destroyed by raiding Caribs who killed five of its members in 1579.

Aguada remained unsettled throughout most of the 17th-century, with most of the regional activity at the time consisting of piracy and smuggling. Still, Aguada resurfaced and became a stopover point for ships on their way to Spain from South America. On September 17, 1692, King Charles II of Spain emitted a Royal Decree authorizing the foundation of a parish (and a third iteration of the Aguada settlement), and assigning Captain Juan López de Segura as War Lieutenant and Ordinary Mayor of the Villa de San Francisco de Asís de la Aguada, making Aguada one of the five self-governing settlements (Partidos Propios) in Puerto Rico, along with San Juan, San Germán, San Blas (Coamo) and San Felipe (Arecibo).

In 1737, Philip V, King of Spain, declared that all mail en route to Venezuela and other South American ports from Puerto Rico should depart from the port of Aguada, leading to the rapid economic growth in the town. Also, an increase in population has been attributed to possible desertions from foreign merchant ships. With the population growth in northwestern Puerto Rico, Aguada also lost territory with the foundation and independence of former constituents such as San Sebastián (1752), Rincón (1771) and Aguadilla (1780). Captain General of Cuba Fernando Miyares visited Aguada in 1775 and described it as having 180 houses, and barracks with two infantry companies and a cavalry company. Fray Íñigo Abbad y Lasierra also visited in the 1770s, further describing its large town square, derelict church, and the sugar and rice crops amongst the swampy geography of the area. The sugarcane industry grew drastically in Puerto Rico during the second half of the 19th century, and in Aguada, most of the rice crops were removed to make way for the sugarcane plantations. Central Coloso was founded during this time by a local businessman with the name Vadí and a German Puerto Rican entrepreneur named H. Kuster. Together they ran the sugarcane mill until 1897, when they sold it to merchant José Amill Massó who redeveloped it into a modern refinery that continue to operate throughout the 20th century.

Puerto Rico was ceded by Spain in the aftermath of the Spanish–American War under the terms of the Treaty of Paris of 1898 and became an unincorporated territory of the United States. In 1899, the United States Department of War conducted its first census of Puerto Rico finding that the population of Aguada was 10,581.

In the early years of the 20th century, two disasters affected Aguada. First, a huge fire in 1912 destroyed most of the town buildings, including the old city hall, which contained all the city archives. On October 11, 1918, at 10:14:42 local time an earthquake known as the San Fermín earthquake destroyed the church and other structures. At Culebrinas River, 1000 kg blocks of limestone from the wrecked Columbus monument were carried inland to distances of 46–76 meters (151–249 feet) by waves 4.0 m (13.1 ft) high.

Hurricane María on September 20, 2017, triggered numerous landslides in Aguada, with its strong winds and heavy rain. Infrastructure and an estimated 8,000 homes in Aguada were damaged or destroyed. Two police officers died when they were caught in the flooded Culebrinas River.

On July 16, 2023 a tornado touched down in Aguada, producing EF1 damage which included tearing a roof from a house and damage to power lines. The city is notorious for stormy weather.

== Geography ==
Aguada is located in the west coast of the island of Puerto Rico. It borders the Atlantic Ocean and Aguadilla on the north, Moca on the east, Añasco on the south, and Rincón on the west. Aguada is part of the Coastal Plains of the West, which features alluvial and fertile terrain. Although the terrain is mostly plain, there are some mountains to the south and southeast.

Among the mountains located in Aguada are the Atalaya Peak, located within the limits of Aguada and Rincón. Also, San Francisco Mountain, which is popularly known as the birth point of the Cordillera Central, and Cerro Gordo, peaking at 853 feet (260 meters).

=== Water features ===
Aguada's hydrographic system is composed of the Río Culebrinas, Río Grande, Río Cañas, Río Culebra, Río Guayabo, and Río Ingenio. All of these rivers flow into the Mona Passage. According to a news article by Primera Hora, there are ten beaches in Aguada. Aguada has an area of 45.55 square miles and 14.62% are water bodies.

=== Barrios ===
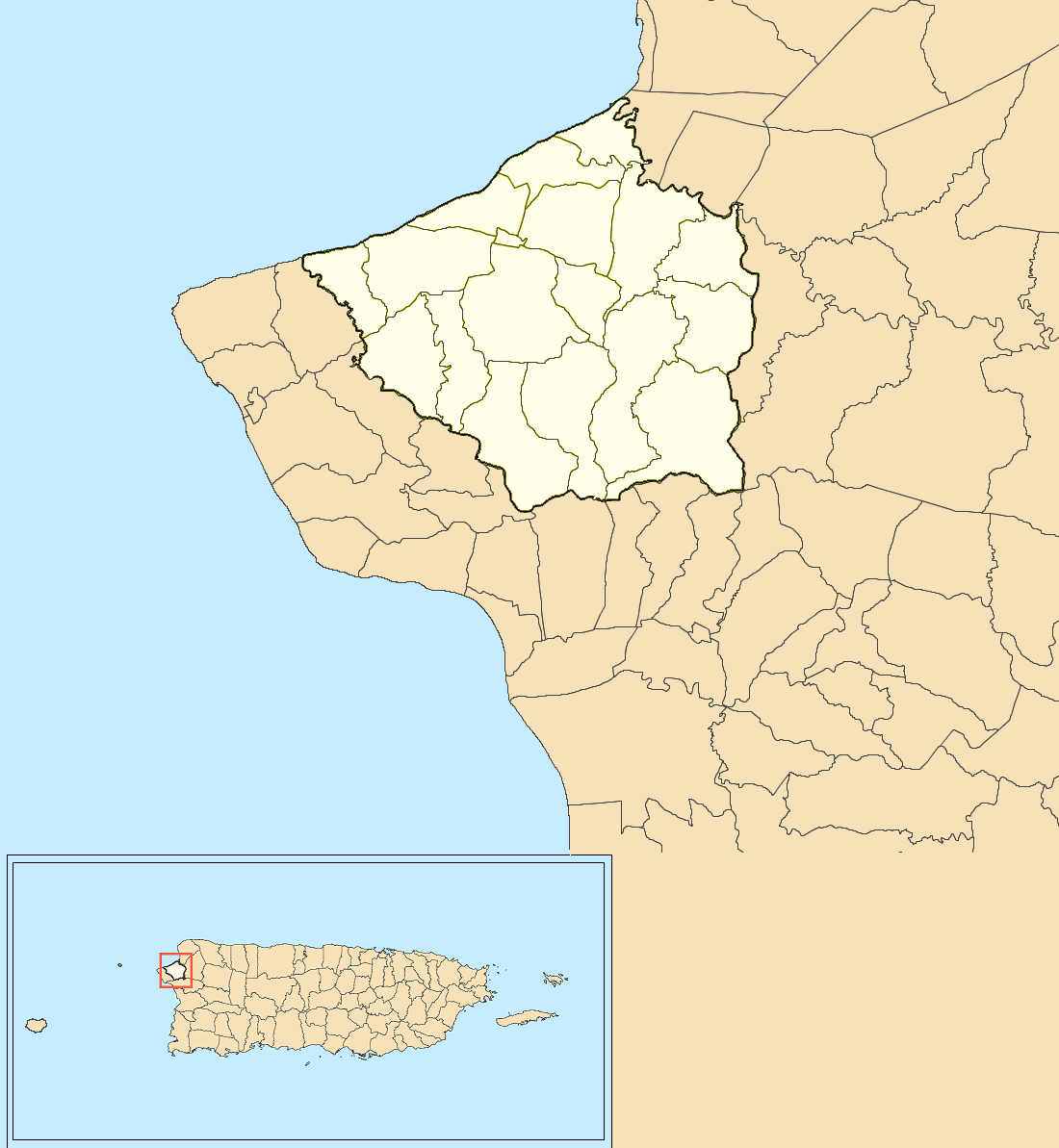
Aguada map labeled with barrio subdivisions

Like all municipalities of Puerto Rico, Aguada is subdivided into barrios:

1. Aguada barrio-pueblo
2. Asomante
3. Atalaya
4. Carrizal
5. Cerro Gordo
6. Cruces
7. Espinar
8. Guanábano
9. Guaniquilla
10. Guayabo
11. Jagüey
12. Lagunas
13. Mal Paso
14. Mamey
15. Marías
16. Naranjo
17. Piedras Blancas
18. Río Grande

=== Sectors ===
Barrios (which are, in contemporary times, roughly comparable to minor civil divisions) in turn are further subdivided into smaller local populated place areas/units called sectores (which means sectors in English). The types of sectores may vary, from normally sector to urbanización to reparto to barriada to residencial, among others.

=== Special Communities ===
Comunidades Especiales de Puerto Rico (Special Communities of Puerto Rico) are marginalized communities whose citizens are experiencing a certain amount of social exclusion. A map shows these communities occur in nearly every municipality of the commonwealth. Of the 742 places that were on the list in 2014, the following barrios, communities, sectors, or neighborhoods were in Aguada: Parcelas Noboa Vieja and Parcelas Noboa Nuevas in Guanaquilla barrio, Calle San Francisco, Calle San José, Comunidad Las Flores, Sector Las Bimbas in Luyando comunidad, Parcelas Matías, Parcelas Nieves, and Sector García.

=== Climate ===
Climate data for Coloso, Puerto Rico (1991–2020 normals, extremes 1900–present)
Month	Jan	Feb	Mar	Apr	May	Jun	Jul	Aug	Sep	Oct	Nov	Dec	Year
Record high °F (°C)	100 (38)	96 (36)	97 (36)	98 (37)	97 (36)	98 (37)	98 (37)	97 (36)	98 (37)	96 (36)	100 (38)	95 (35)	100 (38)
Mean maximum °F (°C)	87.8 (31.0)	88.1 (31.2)	89.2 (31.8)	90.2 (32.3)	91.6 (33.1)	92.5 (33.6)	92.2 (33.4)	92.6 (33.7)	92.3 (33.5)	91.5 (33.1)	90.4 (32.4)	88.3 (31.3)	93.9 (34.4)
Mean daily maximum °F (°C)	84.3 (29.1)	84.7 (29.3)	85.6 (29.8)	86.3 (30.2)	87.4 (30.8)	88.8 (31.6)	88.8 (31.6)	89.0 (31.7)	89.1 (31.7)	88.5 (31.4)	86.7 (30.4)	84.9 (29.4)	87.0 (30.6)
Daily mean °F (°C)	75.1 (23.9)	75.2 (24.0)	76.1 (24.5)	77.4 (25.2)	79.2 (26.2)	80.4 (26.9)	80.7 (27.1)	80.9 (27.2)	80.9 (27.2)	80.3 (26.8)	78.6 (25.9)	76.3 (24.6)	78.4 (25.8)
Mean daily minimum °F (°C)	65.9 (18.8)	65.7 (18.7)	66.7 (19.3)	68.6 (20.3)	70.9 (21.6)	72.1 (22.3)	72.6 (22.6)	72.8 (22.7)	72.8 (22.7)	72.1 (22.3)	70.6 (21.4)	67.7 (19.8)	69.9 (21.1)
Mean minimum °F (°C)	61.1 (16.2)	60.6 (15.9)	61.6 (16.4)	63.7 (17.6)	66.2 (19.0)	68.1 (20.1)	69.2 (20.7)	69.3 (20.7)	69.2 (20.7)	68.3 (20.2)	66.0 (18.9)	63.5 (17.5)	59.1 (15.1)
Record low °F (°C)	45 (7)	46 (8)	50 (10)	51 (11)	56 (13)	58 (14)	56 (13)	60 (16)	59 (15)	59 (15)	57 (14)	50 (10)	45 (7)
Average precipitation inches (mm)	2.47 (63)	2.67 (68)	3.25 (83)	5.28 (134)	9.82 (249)	8.70 (221)	9.14 (232)	10.45 (265)	9.27 (235)	8.91 (226)	5.10 (130)	2.44 (62)	77.50 (1,969)
Average precipitation days (≥ 0.01 in)	9.2	9.2	10.8	12.1	16.9	17.0	15.6	17.5	16.5	17.2	13.5	9.9	165.4
Source: NOAA

== Demographics ==
Historical population
Census	Pop.	Note	%±
1900	10,581		—
1910	11,587		9.5%
1920	12,981		12.0%
1930	14,670		13.0%
1940	17,923		22.2%
1950	20,743		15.7%
1960	23,234		12.0%
1970	25,658		10.4%
1980	31,567		23.0%
1990	35,911		13.8%
2000	42,042		17.1%
2010	41,959		−0.2%
2020	38,136		−9.1%
2025 (est.)	37,319	▼	−2.1%
U.S. Decennial Census; 1899 (shown as 1900) 1910–1930; 1930–1950 1960–2000 2010 2020

Racial – (self-defined) Aguada, Puerto Rico – 2020 Census
Race	Population	% of Total
White	8,673	22.7%
Black/Afro Puerto Rican	4,043	10.6%
Native Americans/ Alaska Native	1,150	3.0%
Asian	65	0.2%
Two or more races/Some other race	24,205	63.5%

In 2020, the population of Aguada decreased by 9.1% to 38,136. In 2010, the population of Aguada was 41,959, which represented a small decrease from the 42,042 registered in the 2000 Census. Until its decrease in 2010, Aguada's population had been increasing steadily.

According to the 2020 Census, 22.7% of the population identifies themselves as White, and 10.6% as Black. Also, according to the census, the population is equally divided by gender (49.1% are males, while 50.1% are females). Finally, 23.7% of the population is under 18 years old. The next biggest percentage of population (20.8%) is between 35 and 49 years old.

== Economy ==
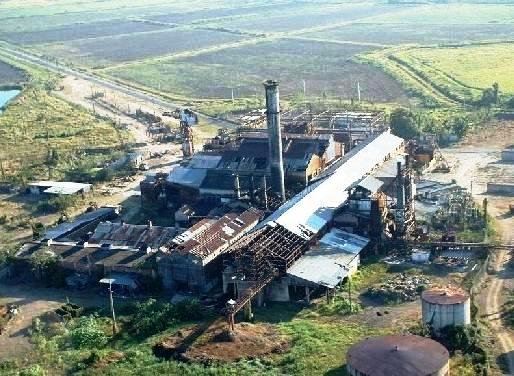
Coloso Sugar Cane Refinery

Historically, the economy of Aguada was mostly based on the processing of sugarcane. The Central Coloso, located in the Guanábano barrio of Aguada, was one of the most important refineries in the island. It was also the last one to cease operations, officially closing in 2003. Aside from sugar mills, there was also a cattle and wood industry.

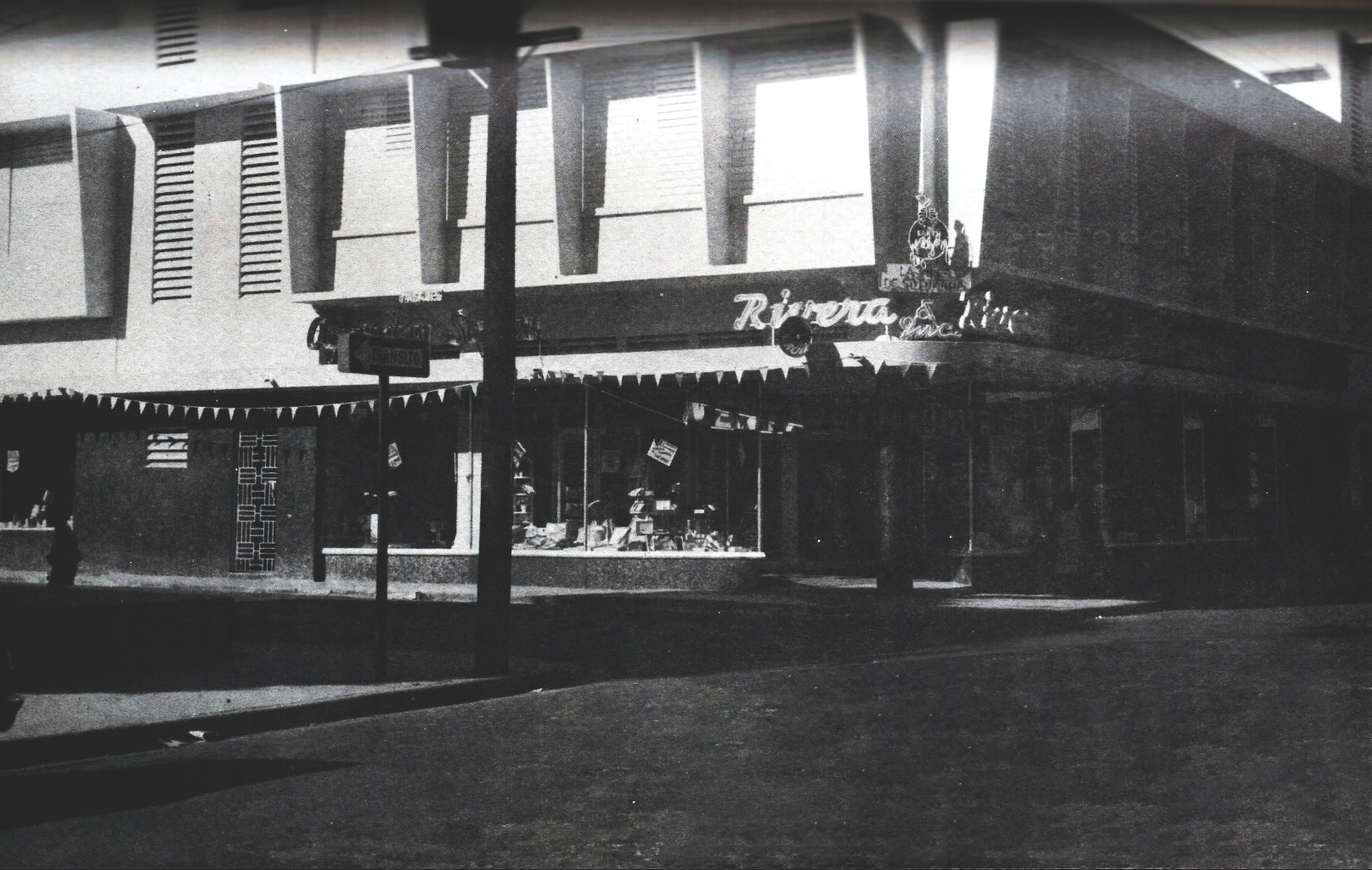
La Villa de Sotomayor Department Store by Rivera & Rivera, Inc.

The commercial economy in Aguada reached a great boom in the 1950s. There were many commercial stores selling merchandise, grocery, hardware, and food products of all categories. “La Villa de Sotomayor” by Rivera & Rivera, Inc., founded around 1912 by Remigio Rivera Bonet, was the biggest and most important business in Aguada with an estimated income that exceeded the million dollars annually at that time. Rivera & Rivera, Inc. had department stores, hardware stores, bakeries, travel agencies and LPG gas distribution, among other business in Aguada and the region. As of 2012, the Aguada economy relies mostly on small businesses and manufacturing.

In late 2014, the government announced a $172 million deal with private investors to restart sugar production in Puerto Rico for the purpose of supplying the island rum producers with up to 56% of the molasses needed. The plan involved building a new processing plant on the grounds of the old Coloso Sugar Cane factory in Aguada.

=== Tourism ===
Aguada is part of the Porta del Sol touristic region in Puerto Rico. The Porta del Sol website highlights Aguada's town square and beaches as its most notable touristic attractions.

=== Landmarks and places of interest ===
To stimulate local tourism during the COVID-19 pandemic in Puerto Rico, the Puerto Rico Tourism Company launched the Voy Turistiendo (I'm Touring) campaign in 2021. The campaign featured a passport book with a page for each municipality. The Voy Turisteando Aguada passport page lists the Ermita Espinar which are ruins, Jeanmarie Chocolat, which was the first commercial chocolate farm in Puerto Rico, and Pirámide, the only pyramid in Puerto Rico, as places of interest.

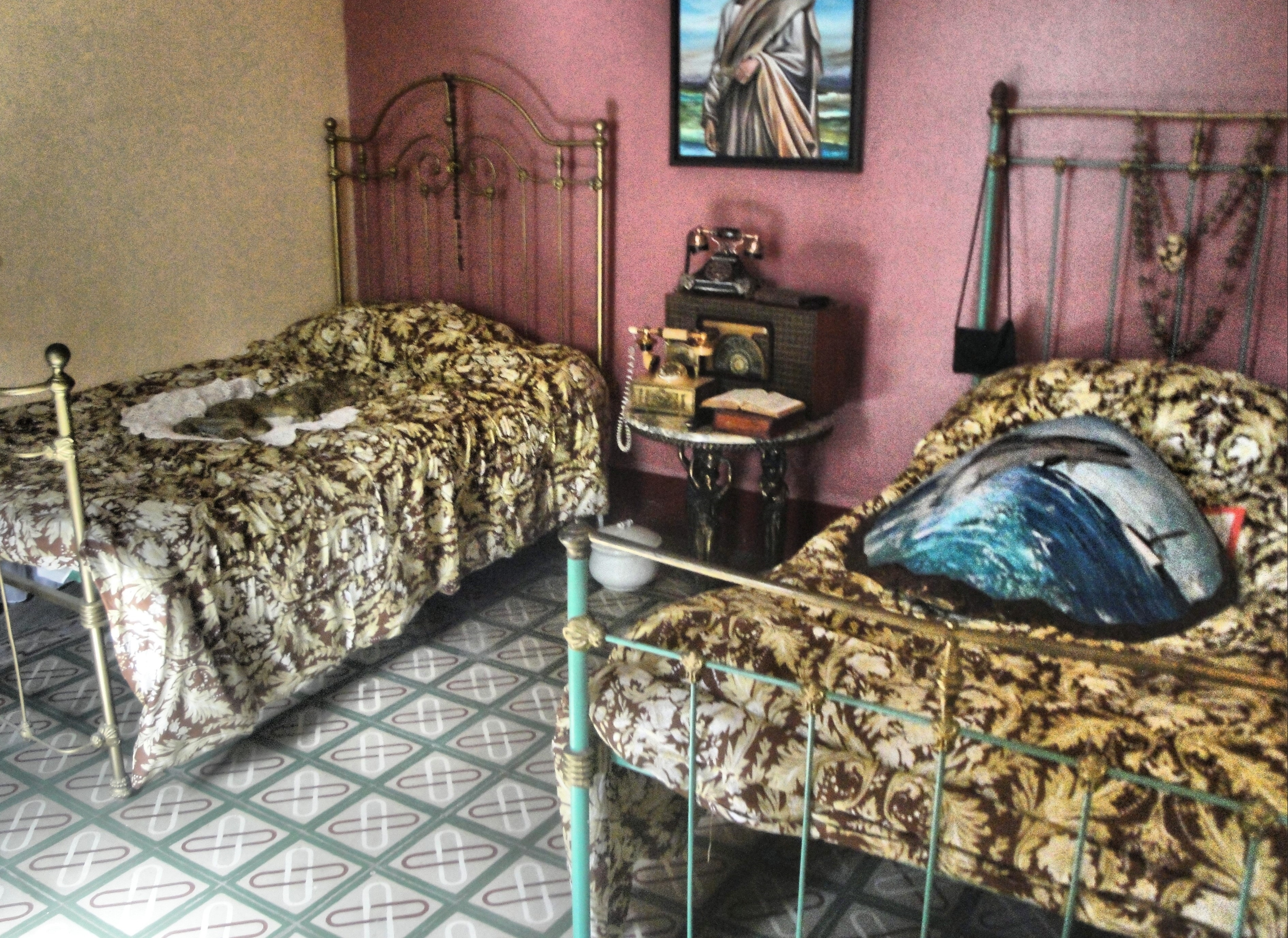
Museo de Antiguedades

- Aguada Museum (located in a former railroad station building)
- Church of San Francisco de Asís
- Coloso Sugar Cane Refinery
- La Cruz de Culebrinas
- Pico de Piedra Beach
- Playa Espinar
- Loma Linda Stables
- Aguada transmission station, the tallest man-made structure in Puerto Rico
- The Aguada Pyramid

The Puente de Coloso, built in 1928, is an 85-ft-long bridge which crosses over the Culebrinas River, and is located between the Guanábano and Espinar barrios in Aguada. It is recognized for its historic significance.

The only Oriental Orthodox Church in Puerto Rico specifically the Syriac Catholic Orthodox Church is located in Aguada near the downtown area in the Novoa II Community.

== Human resources ==
=== Education ===
Like all other municipalities in the island, public education is overseen by the Puerto Rico Department of Education. In 2020, there were 11 public schools in Aguada, most of them in the elementary level.

#	School Name	± Students as of 2018–2019	Grades
1.	Anselmo Villarubia	303	PK-5
2.	Aquilino Caban	501	PK-8
3.	Centro Vocacional Especial	126	Vocational
4.	Dr. Carlos Gonzalez	832	10–12
5.	Eladio Tirado Lopez	279	9–12
6.	Jose Gonzalez Ruiz	146	KG-5
7.	Juan L. Santiago	601	PK-6
8.	Lydia Melendez	253	KG-5
9.	Profesora Juana Rosario	491	6–9
10.	Su Epifanio Estrada	664	PK-9
11.	Su Juan B. Soto	293	PK-8

=== Public health ===
Although there are no hospitals in Aguada, the town does have a small emergency medical center located near the town center. Most important emergency procedures are carried out in Mayagüez and Aguadilla, Puerto Rico local hospitals.

== Culture ==
=== Folklore ===
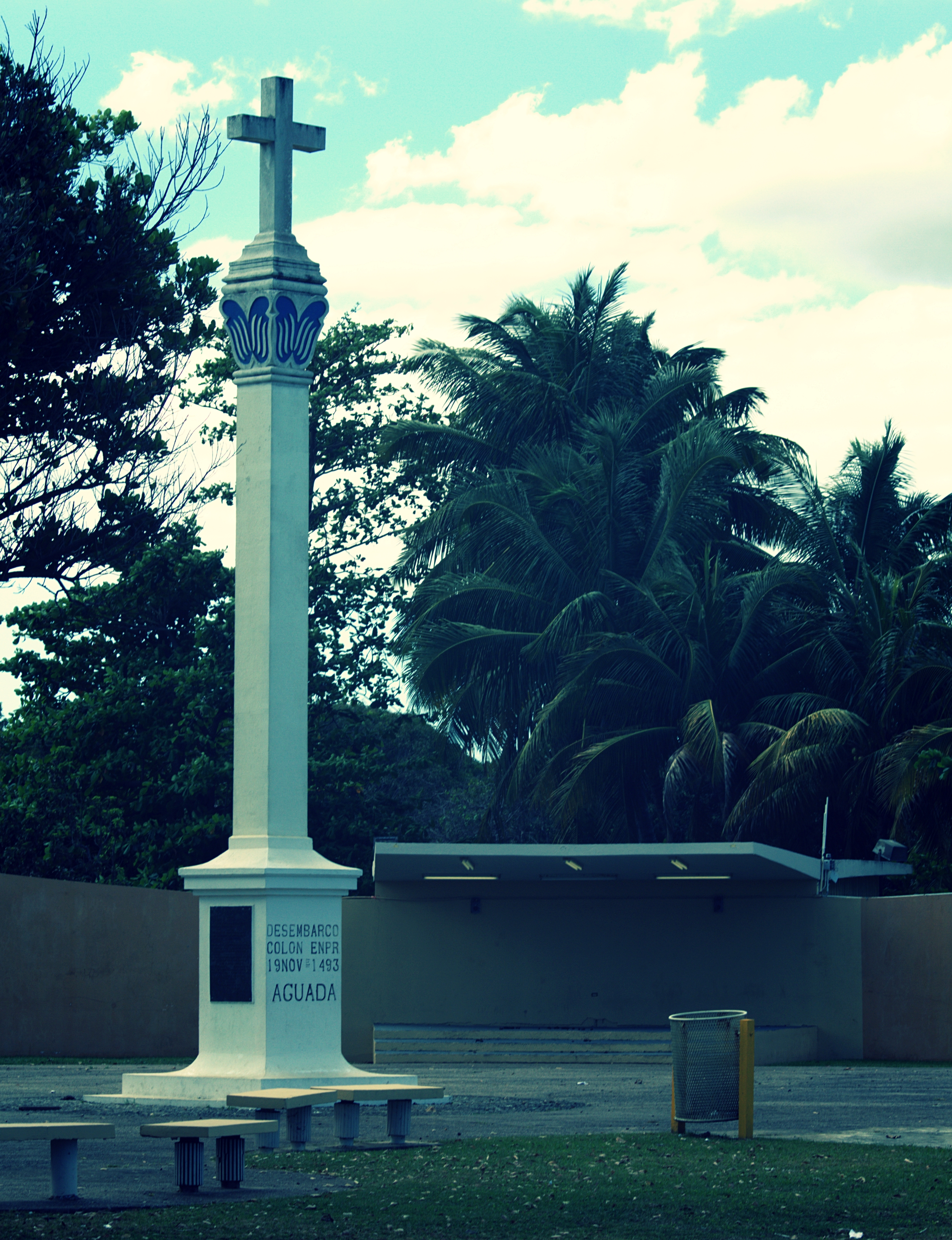
Cross marking spot where Christopher Columbus is said to have disembarked in Aguada

El Matador de Tiburones (The Aguada Shark Killer) is folklore that comes out of Aguada and was written around 1640. It tells of a young man who was accustomed to fighting sharks but was without his religious charm. When asked to demonstrate his shark-fighting capabilities to visiting Spanish dignitaries, he hesitated. All day and night he pondered whether he could fight a shark without his religious charm. Even though the Spaniards had increased their offer to 3 bars of gold the matador was hesitant. In the morning, as the shark came into the bay, the spectators who were gathered on the beach yelled in anticipation, and El Matador de Tiburones, as the young man was called, was unable to stop himself. He jumped into the open sea pursuing the shark and fought it with his bare hands. He was nearly killed and after receiving his prize of gold, vowed to never again fight a shark.

=== Festivals and events ===
Aguada celebrates its patron saint festival in October. The Fiestas Patronales de San Francisco de Asis is a religious and cultural celebration in honor of Saint Francis of Assisi that generally features parades, games, artisans, amusement rides, regional food, and live entertainment. The festival has featured live performances by well-known artists such as Kany García, Tito Rojas, Andy Montañez, and Cano Estremera.

Other festivals and events celebrated in Aguada include:

- Festival de Reyes (Three Kings Festival) which is celebrated in January at Paraíso de los Niños park. It is an activity dedicated to children of Aguada and is celebrated with gifts, music, clowns, and raffles.
- Festival de Playa (Beach Festival) is celebrated on June 24, the day of San Juan Bautista (Saint John the Baptist), at the Pico de Piedra Beach.
- Festival y Feria de Artesanías (Arts & Craft Fair) takes place from November 17–20 at the Plaza Cristóbal Colón.
- Every year in November, a parade called La Parada del Descubrimento takes place to remember the discovery of Puerto Rico by Christopher Columbus. In this parade the people walk from the Catholic church in the town square to the Santurario Histórico a Colón (Cross of Columbus) next to the beach in Guaniquilla.
- Festival de Cabras de Raza is held on the last weekend of May in the Atalaya barrio, with exhibitions of different goat breeds and competitions.
- Parranda del Octavón is a one-day annual, cultural activity that takes place in January at the Plaza Cristóbal Colón, with local music.
- Encuentro de Talladores (Carvers' Meeting) is a one-day annual celebration that takes place the first weekend of July at the Plaza Cristóbal Colón, to commemorate the birthday of Don Zoilo Cajigas a carver of wooden saints. Carved wooden saints are on exhibition and for sale.

=== Sports ===
Los Santeros de Aguada is the name of Aguada's current basketball team.

== Transportation ==
The main road leading to Aguada is PR-115, if you're coming from the north. If you're traveling from the south, you have to take PR-2.

There are 18 bridges in Aguada.

== Government ==
=== Mayors ===
All municipalities in Puerto Rico are administered by a mayor, elected every four years. The mayor of Aguada is Christian Cortes.

This is a list of registered and known mayors of Aguada, until present time.

Years	Mayor	Political Party
1921–1929	Manuel Ruiz Gonzalez	
1929–1933	Carlos Gonzalez	
1933–1937	Efigenio Charneco	
1937–1941	Femando Rivera	
1941–1945	Andres Carrero	
1945–1949	Juan Villarrubia Santiago	PPD
1949–1961	Manuel Egipciaco	PPD
1961–1969	Juan Figueroa Gonzalez	PPD
1969–1973	Julio C. Roman Gonzalez (Yuyo)	PNP
1973–1977	Mabel Velez de Acevedo	PPD
1977–2001	Julio C. Roman Gonzalez (Yuyo)	PNP
2001–2005	Miguel A. Ruiz Hernandez (Miguelito)	PPD
2005–2013	Luis A. Echevarria Santiago (Berty)	PNP
2013–2017	Jessie Cortés Ramos	PPD
2017–2021	Manuel Gabina Santiago	PNP
2021–present	Christian E. Cortés Feliciano	PPD

=== Senate ===
The city belongs to the Puerto Rico Senatorial district IV of Mayagüez-Aguadilla, which is represented by two Senators.

=== House of Representatives ===
The city is represented in the 18th District which is represented by one representative.

=== Local Legislature ===
All municipalities have a local legislature.

== Symbols ==
The municipio has an official flag and coat of arms.

=== Flag ===
Aguada flag

Aguada's flag was designed by Pedro Vélez Adróvar. It features three main colors: white, red, and yellow. White represents purity and the waters of Culebrinas River. Over the white field, a blue triangle with a white dove is featured. The dove is the symbol of peace that unites the towns. Red symbolizes the martyrdom of Franciscan friars from Espinal. Over the red field, there's a black cross which represents the birth of Christianity in Puerto Rico. The name of "Aguada" is also above the cross. The yellow field represents happiness and hospitality of the residents. Over the yellow field, there's a white star which symbolizes the hope of the town for more development and progress.

=== Coat of Arms ===
Aguada coat of arms

The coat of arms is divided into two main fields. The upper field features a cross, with the interlaced arms of Christ and Father Saint Francis. It is taken from the badge of the Order of Friars Minor. It represents "Pax et Bonum", a Latin phrase which means "peace and good will between man and the Redeemer". The sun below the cross symbolizes the light that brightens the world. The lower part of the shield consists of five ships that symbolize the second voyage of Christopher Columbus, who allegedly arrived at the western "Guaniquilla" coast on November 19, 1493, to gather water. Although the precise location is disputed, the Aguada wells (Puerto de los pozos de la Aguada de Colón) is a plausible site for the actual event.

The mural crown in the upper part of the shield signifies the title of village, that was given to this town by King Charles III in 1778. The official colors of the shield are red, which stands for the fraternal love in Aguada; gold, for the Spanish royalty in Puerto Rico; green, for the island's hope and fertility; black, for the wooden beam of the cross; blue, for the sky and the kingship of God; and white, for Christ's purity and the purity of the people of the town toward the cultural patrimony.

=== Nicknames ===
Aguada has various nicknames, most of them pertaining to its origins. One is "La Villa del Sotomayor" ("Sotomayor Village"), which was the name originally given to it by Cristóbal de Sotomayor during its colonization in 1510. It is also called "Villa de San Francisco de Asís de la Aguada", which was the name given to the region when the Franciscan friars took control of it. Aguada is also called "La Ciudad del Descubrimiento" ("City of the Discovery") in reference to it being one of the possible places where Christopher Columbus entered the island. Other nicknames are "El Pueblo Playero" ("The Beach Town") for its many beaches, and "La Ciudad del Vaticano" ("The Vatican City") for being considered the "capital of Catholicism" in the island.

=== Anthem ===
Aguada's anthem was written by Rolando Acevedo Lorenzo.

=== Patron Saint ===
Saint Francis of Assisi is Aguada's patron saint.

== Notable "Aguadeños" ==
- Ismael Miranda – Salsa Singer
- Guillermo "Willie" Hernandez – former Major League Baseball (MLB) pitcher and winner of the 1984 American League MVP and Cy Young Abarrios.
- Andrés Torres – Major League Baseball (MLB) player (San Francisco Giants)
- Zoilo Cajigas Sotomayor – Wood carving artist, especially religious figurines
- Ángel Luis Ríos Matos - Bishop of Mayagüez
- Andres Figueroa Cordero - Political activist and one of the perpetrators of the 1954 United States Capitol shooting.

== Gallery ==
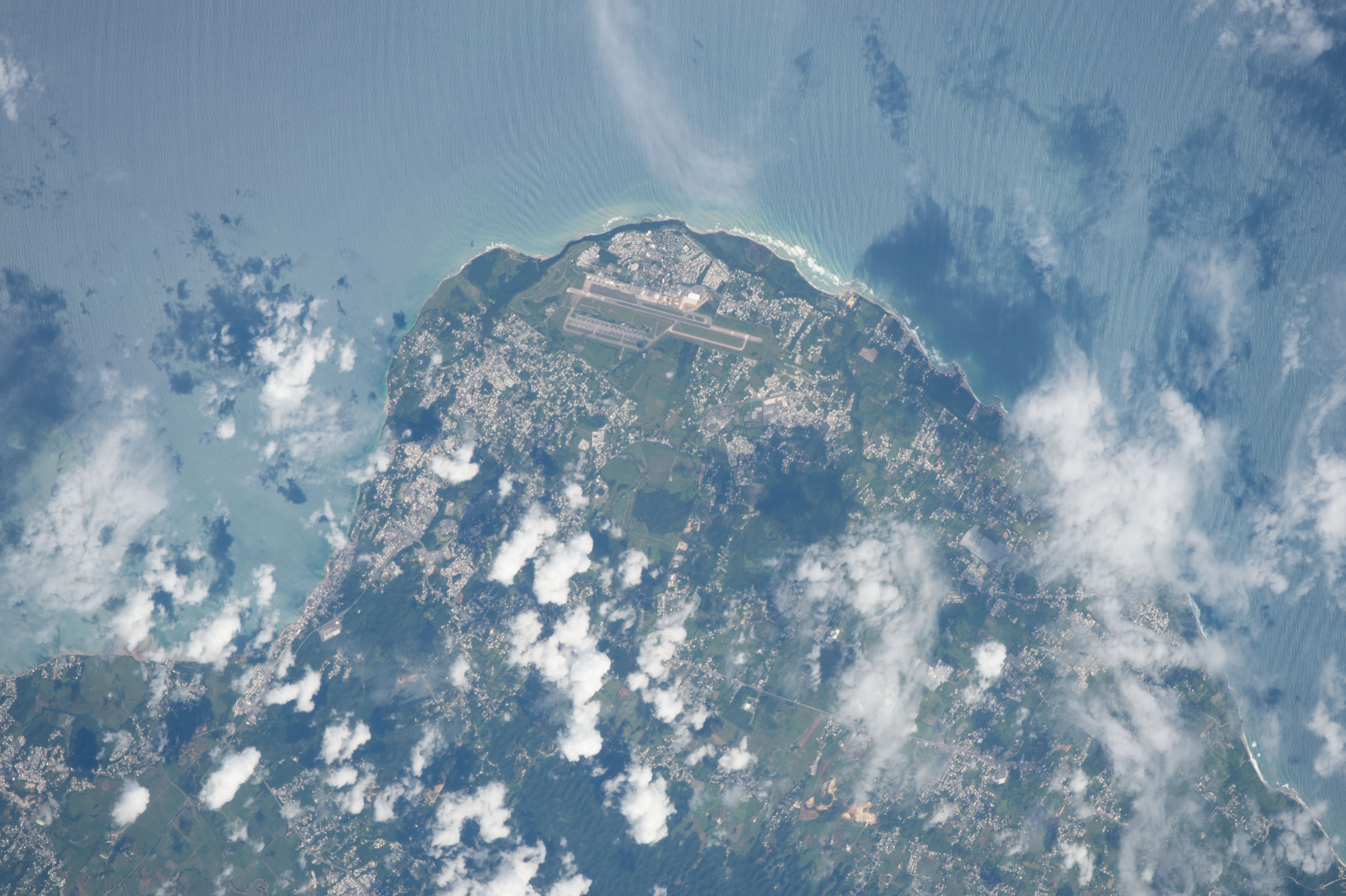
Photo shows Aguada, Aguadilla and Isabela taken from the ISS Expedition 53

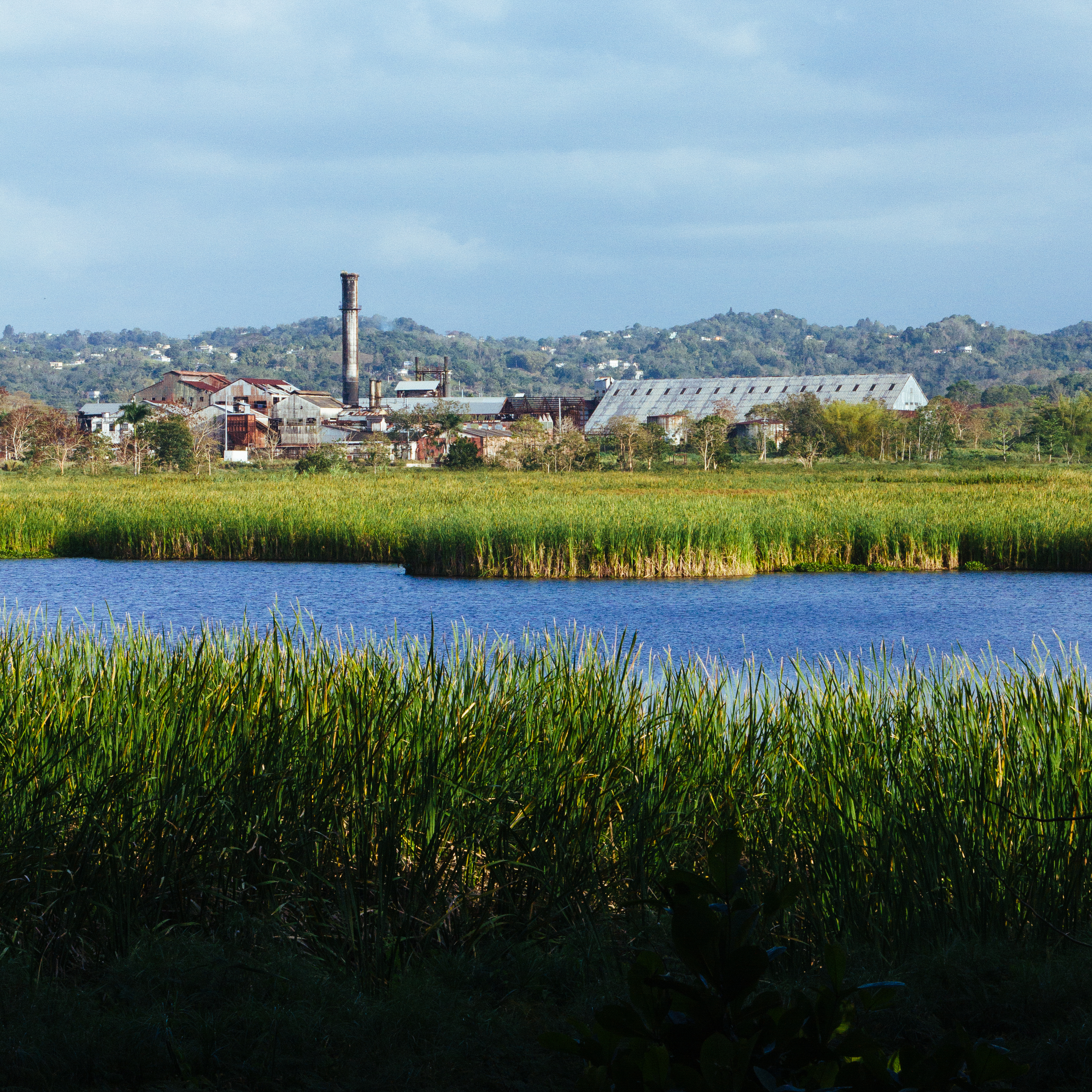
Remains of the Coloso sugarmill in Aguada

== See also ==
- List of Puerto Ricans
- History of Puerto Rico
- National Register of Historic Places listings in Aguada, Puerto Rico
