= Río Grande, Aguada, Puerto Rico =

Barrio of Puerto Rico

Río Grande
- Barrio
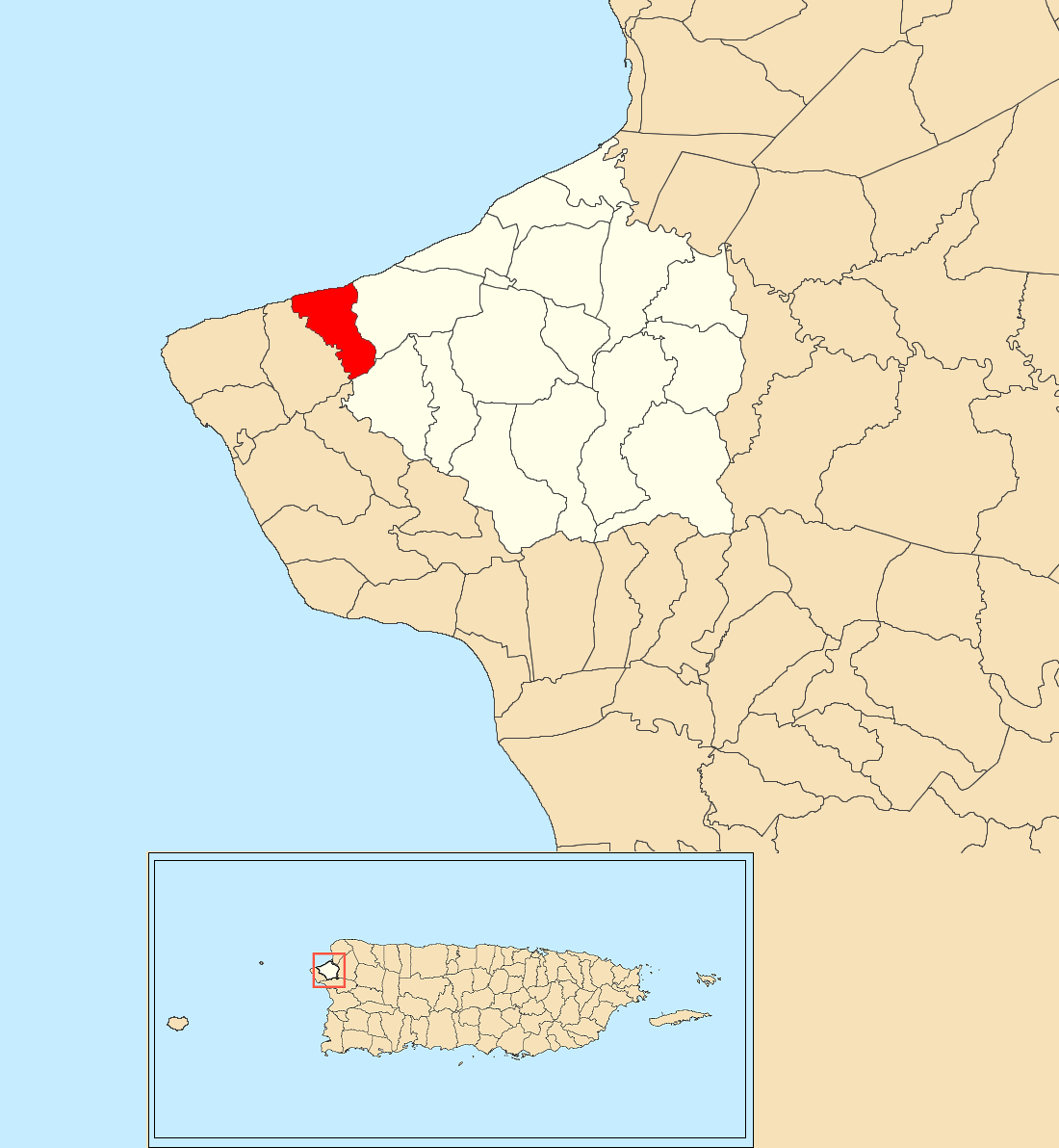
- Location of Río Grande within the municipality of Aguada shown in red

- Location of Puerto Rico
- Coordinates: 18°22′20″N 67°13′51″W
- Commonwealth: Puerto Rico
- Municipality: Aguada

Area
  - Total: 1.35 sq mi (3.5 km^{2})
  - Land: 1.06 sq mi (2.7 km^{2})
  - Water: 0.29 sq mi (0.75 km^{2})
- Elevation: 36 ft (11 m)

Population (2010)
  - Total: 1,152
  - Density: 1,086.8/sq mi (419.6/km^{2})
- Source: 2010 Census
- Time zone: UTC−4 (AST)
- ZIP Code: 00602
- Area codes: 787, 939

Río Grande is a barrio in the municipality of Aguada, Puerto Rico. Its population in 2010 was 1,152.

== History ==
Río Grande was in Spain's gazetteers until Puerto Rico was ceded by Spain in the aftermath of the Spanish–American War under the terms of the Treaty of Paris of 1898 and became an unincorporated territory of the United States. In 1899, the United States Department of War conducted a census of Puerto Rico finding that the combined population of Guayabo, Cruces and Río Grande barrios was 1,533.

Historical population
Census	Pop.	Note	%±
1910	380		—
1920	525		38.2%
1930	524		−0.2%
1940	580		10.7%
1950	613		5.7%
1960	672		9.6%
1970	717		6.7%
1980	921		28.5%
1990	864		−6.2%
2000	1,249		44.6%
2010	1,152		−7.8%
U.S. Decennial Census; 1900 (N/A) 1910-1930; 1930-1950 1960 1980-2000 2010

== Sectors ==
Barrios (which are, in contemporary times, roughly comparable to minor civil divisions) in turn are further subdivided into smaller local populated place areas/units called sectores (sectors in English). The types of sectores may vary, from normally sector to urbanización to reparto to barriada to residencial, among others

The following sectors are in Río Grande barrio:

Parcelas Matías, Parcelas Nieves, Sector Rosado, Sector Tres Tiendas and Sector Valentín.

== See also ==
- List of communities in Puerto Rico
- List of barrios and sectors of Aguada, Puerto Rico
