= Puente de Coloso =

Bridge on NRHP in Aguada, Puerto Rico

- U.S. National Register of Historic Places
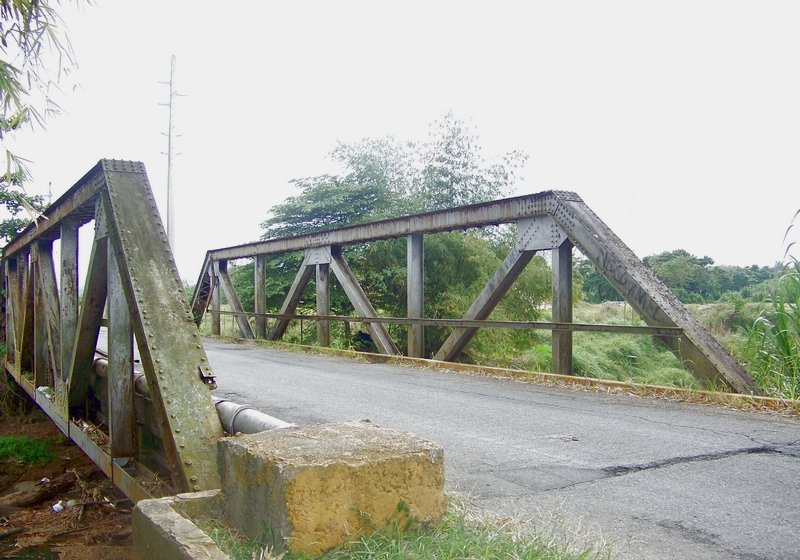
- Coloso Bridge in Aguada

- Location within Puerto Rico
- Location: State Road No. 418, km .5, Guanábano, Aguada, Puerto Rico
- Coordinates: 18.399159°N 67.156184°W
- Area: less than 1 acre (0.40 ha)
- Built: 1928
- Built by: Coloso Sugar Mill
- Architectural style: Warren Truss with verticals
- NRHP reference No.: 10001102
- Added to NRHP: December 29, 2010

Coloso Bridge (Spanish: Puente de Coloso), also known as Bridge Number 1142, is located in Aguada on PR-418 at the 0.5-kilometer (0.31 mi) marking, between the Guanábano and Espinar barrios in Aguada.

It is a metal bridge, 25.9 meters (85 ft) long which crosses over the Culebrinas River. The bridge rails are built in a warren truss style with steel posts. Because the bridge was used for the transport of sugarcane, it was built large enough for truck access. It was built by the Central Coloso sugarcane mill for the railway transportation of the cane harvest. The bridge allowed access to nearby Guanábano and Espinar barrios in Aguada, and Moca.

== Gallery ==
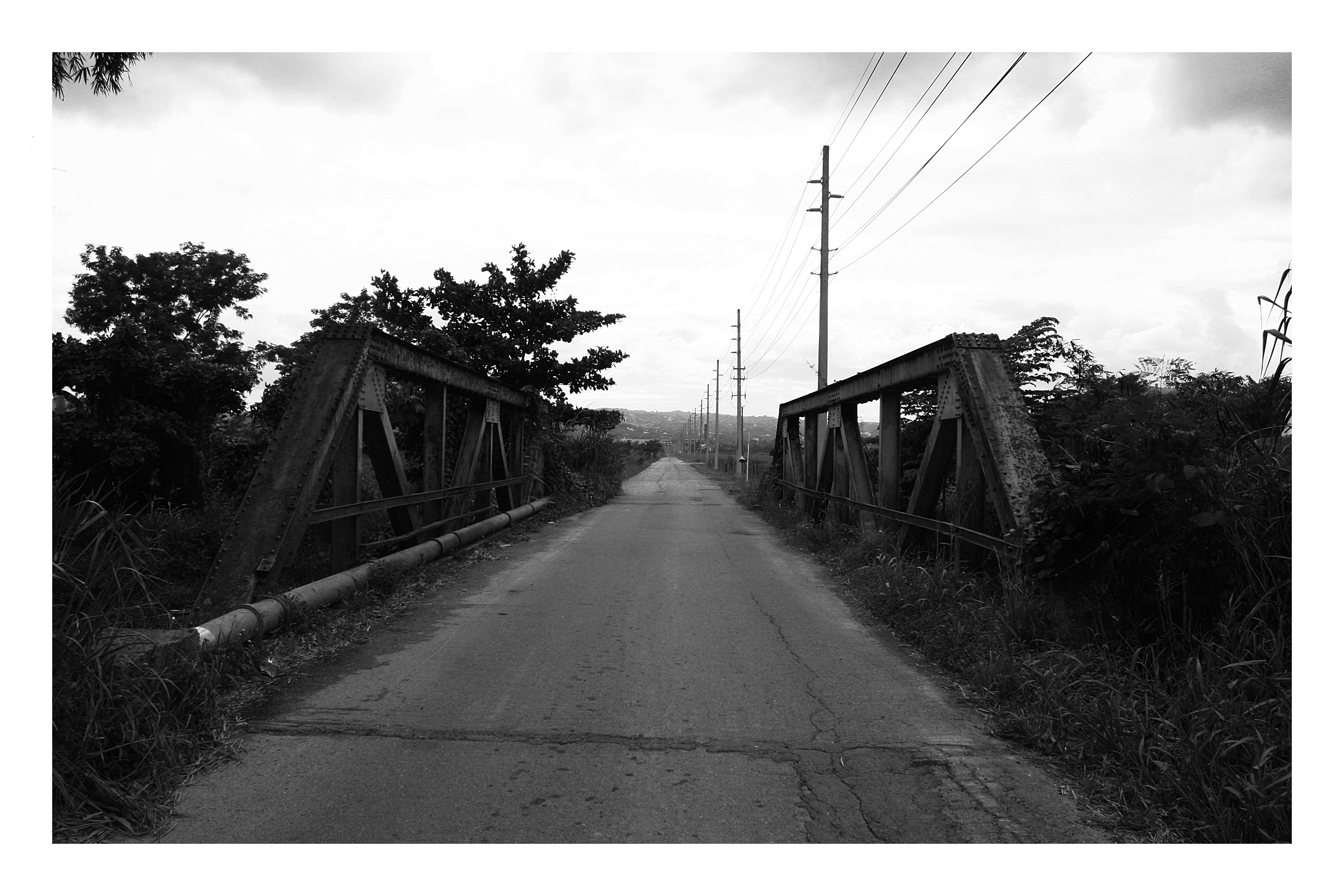
Puente de Coloso

== See also ==
- National Register of Historic Places listings in Puerto Rico
