= Mamey, Aguada, Puerto Rico =

Barrio of Puerto Rico

Mamey
- Barrio
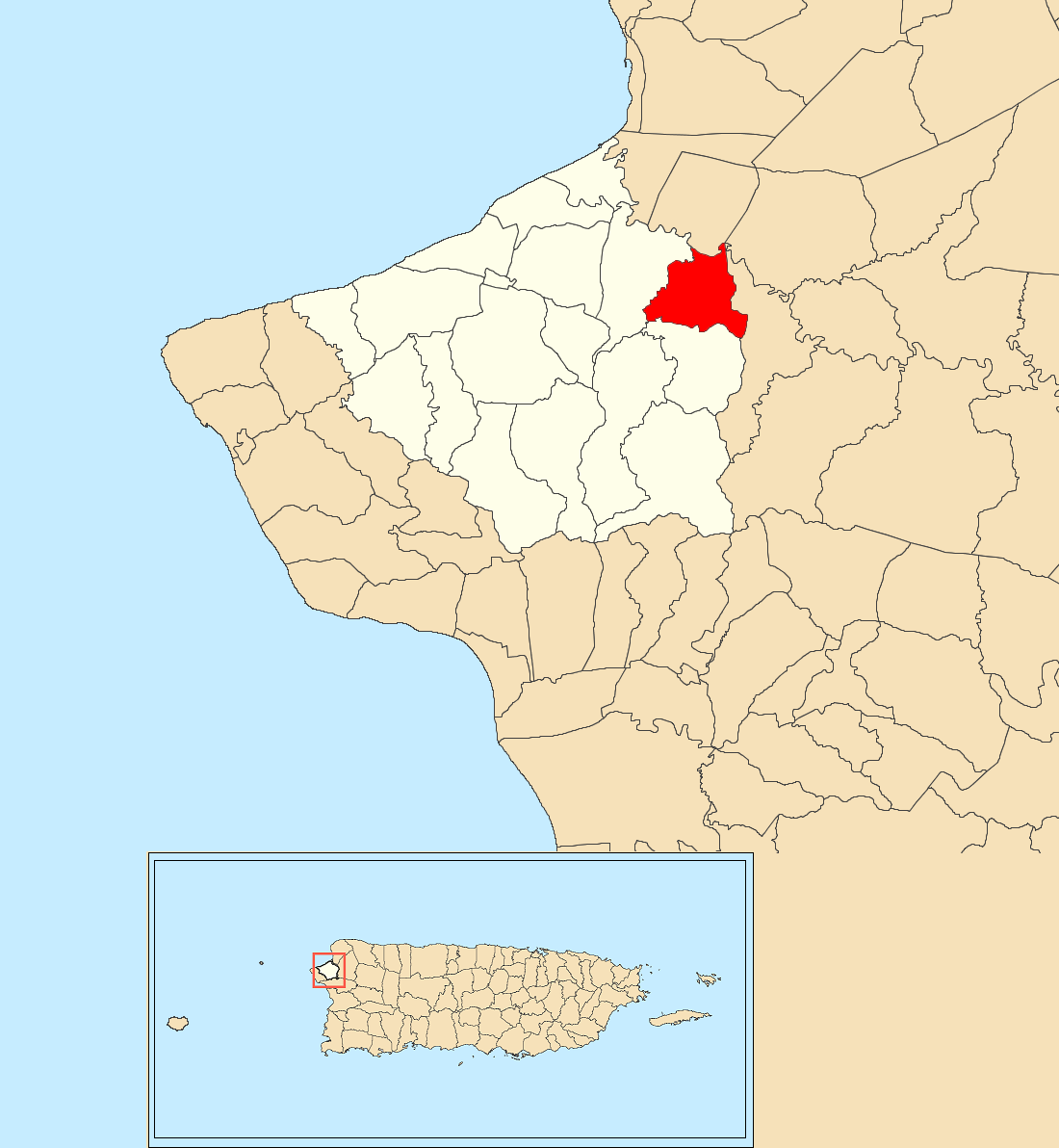
- Location of Mamey within the municipality of Aguada shown in red

- Location of Puerto Rico
- Coordinates: 18°22′38″N 67°08′27″W
- Commonwealth: Puerto Rico
- Municipality: Aguada

Area
  - Total: 1.46 sq mi (3.8 km^{2})
  - Land: 1.45 sq mi (3.8 km^{2})
  - Water: 0.01 sq mi (0.026 km^{2})
- Elevation: 72 ft (22 m)

Population (2010)
  - Total: 2,400
  - Density: 1,655.2/sq mi (639.1/km^{2})
- Source: 2010 Census
- Time zone: UTC−4 (AST)
- ZIP Code: 00602
- Area codes: 787, 939

Mamey is a barrio in the municipality of Aguada, Puerto Rico. Its population in 2010 was 2,400.

== History ==
Mamey was in Spain's gazetteers until Puerto Rico was ceded by Spain in the aftermath of the Spanish–American War under the terms of the Treaty of Paris of 1898 and became an unincorporated territory of the United States. In 1899, the United States Department of War conducted a census of Puerto Rico finding that the population of Mamey barrio was 558.

Historical population
Census	Pop.	Note	%±
1900	558		—
1910	614		10.0%
1920	692		12.7%
1930	719		3.9%
1940	872		21.3%
1950	955		9.5%
1960	877		−8.2%
1970	986		12.4%
1980	1,444		46.5%
1990	1,657		14.8%
2000	2,170		31.0%
2010	2,400		10.6%
U.S. Decennial Census; 1899 (shown as 1900) 1910-1930; 1930-1950 1960 1980-2000 2010

== Sectors ==
Barrios (which are, in contemporary times, roughly comparable to minor civil divisions) in turn are further subdivided into smaller local populated place areas/units called sectores (sectors in English). The types of sectores may vary, from normally sector to urbanización to reparto to barriada to residencial, among others.

The following sectors are in Mamey barrio:

Carretera 110, Sector Acevedo, Sector Adrián López, Sector Cordero, Sector Hito Acevedo, Sector La Cocorita, Sector Los Jiménez, Sector Los Ratones, Sector Nango Soto, Sector Pablo López, Sector Patrio Acevedo, Sector Plan Bonito, Sector Solares Pabón, Sector Tony Cortez, and Tramo Carretera 4417.

== See also ==
- List of communities in Puerto Rico
- List of barrios and sectors of Aguada, Puerto Rico
