= Lagunas, Aguada, Puerto Rico =

Barrio of Puerto Rico

Lagunas Laguna
- Barrio
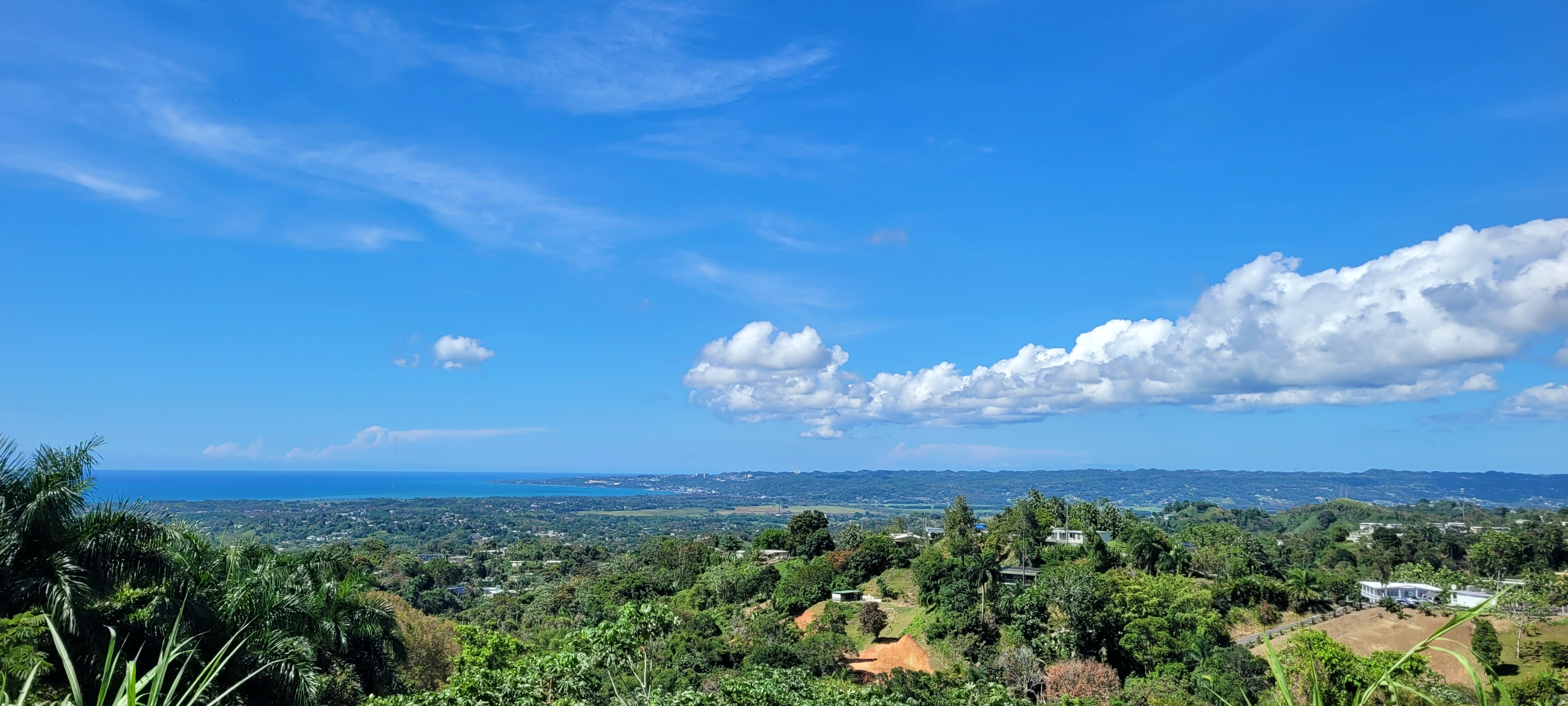
- A scenic view from Puerto Rico Highway 416 in Lagunas

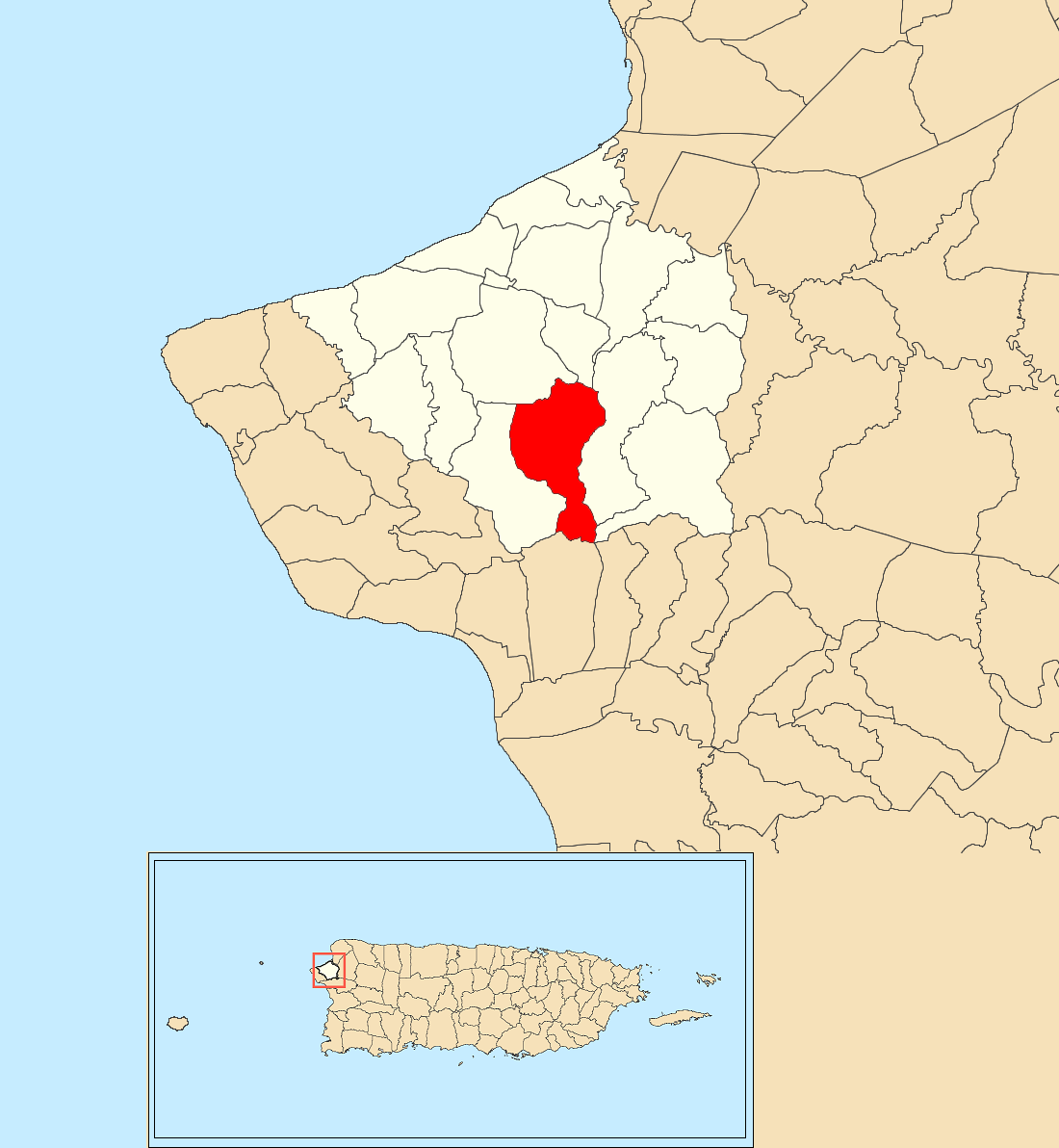
- Location of Lagunas within the municipality of Aguada shown in red

- Location of Puerto Rico
- Coordinates: 18°20′15″N 67°10′17″W
- Commonwealth: Puerto Rico
- Municipality: Aguada

Area
  - Total: 2.36 sq mi (6.1 km^{2})
  - Land: 2.36 sq mi (6.1 km^{2})
  - Water: 0.00 sq mi (0 km^{2})
- Elevation: 564 ft (172 m)

Population (2010)
  - Total: 2,810
  - Density: 1,190.7/sq mi (459.7/km^{2})
- Source: 2010 Census
- Time zone: UTC−4 (AST)
- ZIP Code: 00602
- Area codes: 787, 939

Lagunas is a barrio in the municipality of Aguada, Puerto Rico. Its population in 2010 was 2,810.

== History ==
Lagunas was in Spain's gazetteers until Puerto Rico was ceded by Spain in the aftermath of the Spanish–American War under the terms of the Treaty of Paris of 1898 and became an unincorporated territory of the United States. In 1899, the United States Department of War conducted a census of Puerto Rico finding that the population of Lagunas barrio was 753.

Historical population
Census	Pop.	Note	%±
1900	753		—
1910	793		5.3%
1920	808		1.9%
1930	821		1.6%
1940	1,253		52.6%
1950	1,249		−0.3%
1960	1,502		20.3%
1970	1,507		0.3%
1980	2,025		34.4%
1990	2,550		25.9%
2000	3,315		30.0%
2010	2,810		−15.2%
U.S. Decennial Census; 1899 (shown as 1900) 1910-1930; 1930-1950 1960 1980-2000 2010

== Sectors ==
Barrios (which are, in contemporary times, roughly comparable to minor civil divisions) in turn are further subdivided into smaller local populated place areas/units called sectores (sectors in English). The types of sectores may vary, from normally sector to urbanización to reparto to barriada to residencial, among others.

The following sectors are in Lagunas barrio:

Sector Anselmo González, Sector Atalaya III, Sector Cabo Díaz, Sector Canal 44, Sector Carlos Concepción, Sector Carlos Ruíz, Sector Clotilde Chaparro, Sector Cordero, Sector Dos Vistas, Sector El Deportivo, Sector El Jibarito, Sector El Mangoito, Sector El Río, Sector Gavina Mendoza, Sector Jacob Méndez, Sector Juan Tola, Sector La Paloma, Sector Los Crespo, Sector Los Méndez, Sector Manuel Echevarría, Sector Néctar Rodríguez, Sector Papo Feliciano, Sector Parada García, Sector Pedro Cáceres, Sector Pepe Moreno, Sector Piedra Gorda, Sector Pilar Figueroa, Sector Pin Orama, Sector Rubén Rosa, Sector Ruíz, and Sector Sico Vega.

== See also ==
- List of communities in Puerto Rico
- List of barrios and sectors of Aguada, Puerto Rico
