= Los Santos Zone =

Los Santos Zone Zona de los Santos
- Socioeconomic region
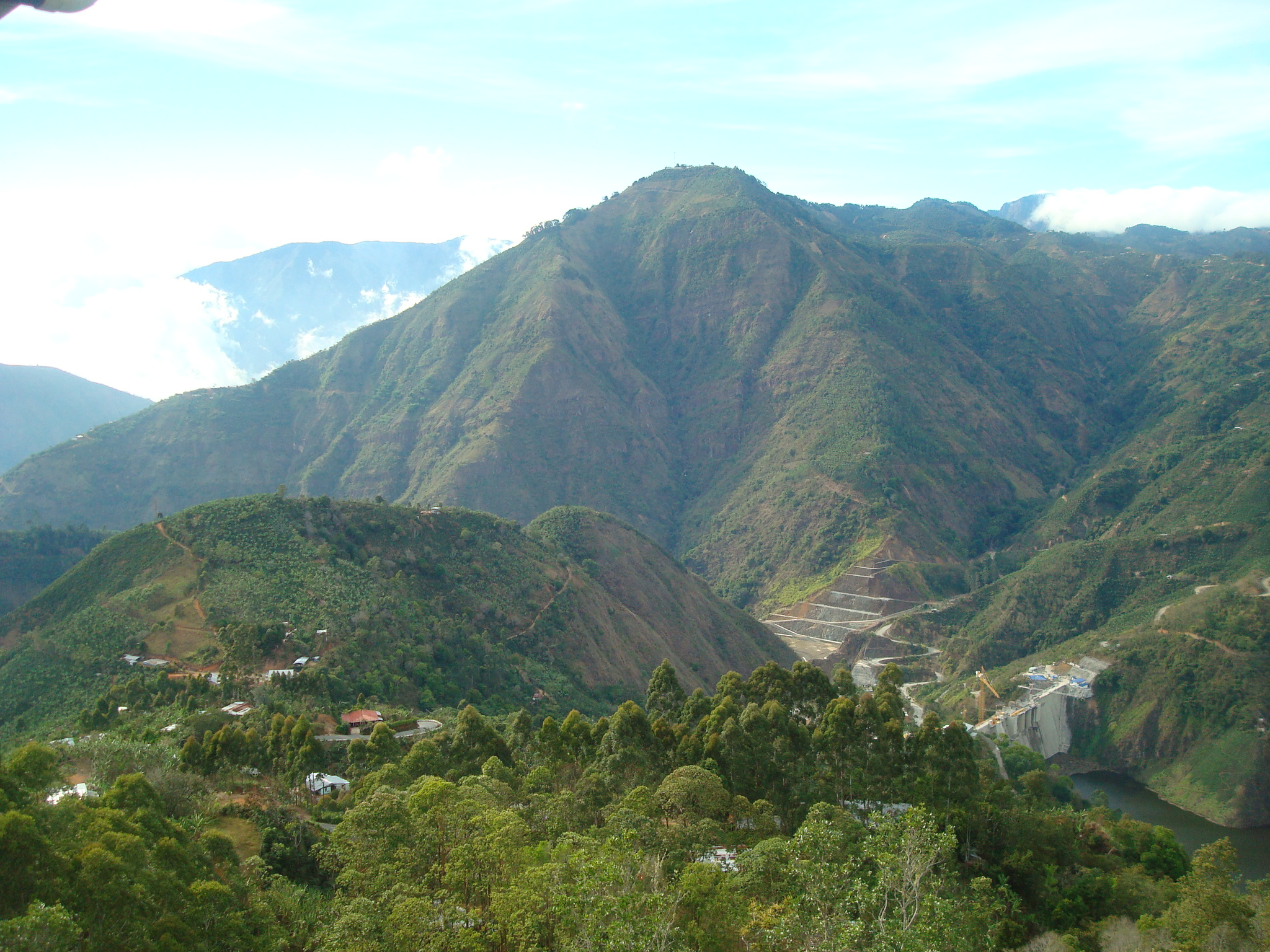
- Pirrís hydroelectric dam, located in Los Santos Zone.

- Location in Costa Rica
- Coordinates: 9.652851°N 83.985303°W
- Country: Costa Rica
- Province: San José

Area
  - Total: 863.24 km^{2} (333.30 sq mi)
- Elevation: 1,550 m (5,090 ft)

Population (2010)
  - Total: 57,181
- Time zone: UTC-6

Los Santos Zone (Spanish: Zona de los Santos) is a mountainous region in the San José Province of Costa Rica, in the center-south of the country. It is also known in Spanish as Valle de los Santos or just Los Santos.

It corresponds to a wide sector of a series of intermontane valleys composed by the cantons of Tarrazú, Dota and León Cortés Castro. The nearby districts of San Cristóbal and Frailes, both of Desamparados canton, are under the socioeconomic influence of the zone.

== Toponymy ==
The name alludes to the catholic saint names of the districts of Santa María of Dota, San Marcos, San Carlos and San Lorenzo of Tarrazú, and San Pablo, San Andrés, San Antonio, San Isidro of León Cortés Castro.

== Conservation areas ==
The Los Quetzales National Park is located in the area.

== Economy ==
=== Agriculture ===
The region is recognized as a major coffee production zone in the country. Apples are also cultivated in the region.

=== Remittances ===
The region's economy and social fabric has been deeply shaped by emigration to the United States, which started in the 1960s. A majority of the region's residents have family members who today reside in the United States, namely in the state of New Jersey. These immigrants play a critical role in bankrolling the region's coffee industry and keeping families afloat as global coffee prices decline.

=== Tourism ===
The zone has many tourist attractions due to the coffee production of the region, Los Quetzales National Park and the easy access through the Inter-American Highway, (Route 2) and close proximity to the Greater Metropolitan Area.
