= Monterrey District, Aserrí =

District in Aserrí canton, San José province, Costa Rica

Monterrey
- District
- Monterrey district
- Monterrey district location in Costa Rica
- Coordinates: 9.7470686°N 84.1140001°W
- Country: Costa Rica
- Province: San José
- Canton: Aserrí
- Creation: 5 April 1966

Area
  - Total: 8.36 km^{2} (3.23 sq mi)
- Elevation: 1,100 m (3,600 ft)

Population (2011)
  - Total: 498
  - Density: 59.6/km^{2} (154/sq mi)
- Time zone: UTC−06:00
- Postal code: 10606

Monterrey is a district of the Aserrí canton, in the San José province of Costa Rica.

== History ==
Monterrey was created on 5 April 1966 by Decreto 15. Segregated from Legua.

== Geography ==
Monterrey has an area of 8.36 km^{2} and an elevation of 1,100 metres.

== Demographics ==
Historical population
Census	Pop.	±% p.a.
1973	926	—
1984	699	−2.52%
2000	421	−3.12%
2011	498	+1.54%
2022	508	+0.18%
Source: Instituto Nacional de Estadística y Censos; Centro Centroamericano de Población

For the 2011 census, Monterrey had a population of 498 inhabitants.

== Transportation ==
=== Road transportation ===
The district is covered by the following road routes:

- National Route 313
- National Route 336
