= San Gabriel District =

District in Aserrí canton, San José province, Costa Rica

San Gabriel
- District
- San Gabriel district
- San Gabriel district location in Costa Rica
- Coordinates: 9.7876217°N 84.1111218°W
- Country: Costa Rica
- Province: San José
- Canton: Aserrí

Area
  - Total: 11.76 km^{2} (4.54 sq mi)
- Elevation: 1,310 m (4,300 ft)

Population (2011)
  - Total: 6,061
  - Density: 515.4/km^{2} (1,335/sq mi)
- Time zone: UTC−06:00
- Postal code: 10604

San Gabriel is a district of the Aserrí canton, in the San José province of Costa Rica.

== Geography ==
San Gabriel has an area of 11.76 km^{2} and an elevation of 1,310 metres.

== Demographics ==
Historical population
Census	Pop.	±% p.a.
1927	1,315	—
1950	1,661	+1.02%
1963	2,111	+1.86%
1973	2,442	+1.47%
1984	2,968	+1.79%
2000	5,048	+3.38%
2011	6,061	+1.68%
2022	6,302	+0.36%
Source: Instituto Nacional de Estadística y Censos; Centro Centroamericano de Población

For the 2011 census, San Gabriel had a population of 6,061 inhabitants.

== Transportation ==
=== Road transportation ===
The district is covered by the following road routes:

- National Route 209
- National Route 222
- National Route 313
