= Salitrillos =

District in Aserrí canton, San José province, Costa Rica

- District
- Salitrillos district
- Salitrillos district location in Costa Rica
- Coordinates: 9.8472968°N 84.0834448°W
- Country: Costa Rica
- Province: San José
- Canton: Aserrí
- Creation: 22 April 1999

Area
  - Total: 14.35 km^{2} (5.54 sq mi)
- Elevation: 1,323 m (4,341 ft)

Population (2011)
  - Total: 13,676
  - Density: 953.0/km^{2} (2,468/sq mi)
- Time zone: UTC−06:00
- Postal code: 10607

Salitrillos is a district of the Aserrí canton, in the San José province of Costa Rica.

== History ==
Salitrillos was created on 22 April 1999 by Decreto 27928-G.

== Geography ==
Salitrillos has an area of 14.35 km^{2} and an elevation of 1,323 metres.

== Demographics ==
Historical population
Census	Pop.	±% p.a.
2000	11,148	—
2011	13,676	+1.88%
2022	12,921	−0.51%
Source: Instituto Nacional de Estadística y Censos; Centro Centroamericano de Población

For the 2011 census, Salitrillos had a population of 13,676 inhabitants.

== Transportation ==
=== Road transportation ===
The district is covered by the following road routes:

- National Route 209
- National Route 304
