= Copey District =

District in Dota canton, San José province, Costa Rica

Copey
- District
- Interactive map of Copey
- Copey district location in Costa Rica
- Coordinates: 9.5600392°N 83.8659994°W
- Country: Costa Rica
- Province: San José
- Canton: Dota

Area
  - Total: 279.41 km^{2} (107.88 sq mi)
- Elevation: 1,853 m (6,079 ft)

Population (2011)
  - Total: 1,803
  - Density: 6.453/km^{2} (16.71/sq mi)
- Time zone: UTC−06:00
- Postal code: 11703

Copey is a district of the Dota canton, in the San José province of Costa Rica.

== Geography ==
Copey has an area of 279.41 km^{2} and an elevation of 1,853 metres.

== Demographics ==
Historical population
Census	Pop.	±% p.a.
1927	518	—
1950	953	+2.69%
1963	1,075	+0.93%
1973	1,264	+1.63%
1984	1,242	−0.16%
2000	1,770	+2.24%
2011	1,803	+0.17%
2022	2,491	+2.98%
Source: Instituto Nacional de Estadística y Censos; Centro Centroamericano de Población

For the 2011 census, Copey had a population of 1,803 inhabitants.

== Transportation ==
=== Road transportation ===
The district is covered by the following road routes:

- National Route 2
- National Route 315
