= Santa María District =

Santa María District may refer to:

- Santa María District, Huaura, in Huaura Province, XXX region, Peru
- Santa María District, Panama
- Santa María District, Dota, in Dota Canton, San José Province, Costa Rica

== See also ==
- Santa Maria (disambiguation)
