= Carara District =

District in Turrubares canton, San José province, Costa Rica

Carara
- District
- Interactive map of Carara
- Carara district location in Costa Rica
- Coordinates: 9.682602°N 84.5294382°W
- Country: Costa Rica
- Province: San José
- Canton: Turrubares

Area
  - Total: 220.35 km^{2} (85.08 sq mi)
- Elevation: 440 m (1,440 ft)

Population (2011)
  - Total: 1,810
  - Density: 8.21/km^{2} (21.3/sq mi)
- Time zone: UTC−06:00
- Postal code: 11605

Carara is a district of the Turrubares canton, in the San José province of Costa Rica.

== Geography ==
Carara has an area of 220.35 km^{2} and an elevation of 440 metres.

== Demographics ==
Historical population
Census	Pop.	±% p.a.
2011	1,810	—
2022	2,147	+1.56%
Source: Instituto Nacional de Estadística y Censos; Centro Centroamericano de Población

For the 2011 census, Carara had a population of 1,810 inhabitants.

== Transportation ==
=== Road transportation ===
The district is covered by the following road routes:

- National Route 319
- National Route 320
- National Route 324
