= Vuelta de Jorco =

District in Aserrí canton, San José province, Costa Rica

- District
- Vuelta de Jorco district
- Vuelta de Jorco district location in Costa Rica
- Coordinates: 9.7716043°N 84.1379691°W
- Country: Costa Rica
- Province: San José
- Canton: Aserrí

Area
  - Total: 22.04 km^{2} (8.51 sq mi)
- Elevation: 1,120 m (3,670 ft)

Population (2011)
  - Total: 6,499
  - Density: 294.9/km^{2} (763.7/sq mi)
- Time zone: UTC−06:00
- Postal code: 10603

Vuelta de Jorco is a district of the Aserrí canton, in the San José province of Costa Rica.

== Geography ==
Vuelta de Jorco has an area of 22.04 km^{2} and an elevation of 1,120 metres.

== Demographics ==
Historical population
Census	Pop.	±% p.a.
1927	1,194	—
1950	2,036	+2.35%
1963	3,082	+3.24%
1973	3,029	−0.17%
1984	3,608	+1.60%
2000	6,155	+3.39%
2011	6,499	+0.50%
2022	7,348	+1.12%
Source: Instituto Nacional de Estadística y Censos; Centro Centroamericano de Población

For the 2011 census, Vuelta de Jorco had a population of 6,499 inhabitants.

== Economy ==
One of its towns, La Uruca, annually organizes, between July and August, the Feria Nacional del Jocote (National Fair of the Jocote), one of the best traditional festivals of the rainy season in Costa Rica.

== Transportation ==
=== Road transportation ===
The district is covered by the following road routes:

- National Route 209
