= San Juan de Mata District =

District in Turrubares canton, San José province, Costa Rica

San Juan de Mata
- District
- San Juan de Mata district
- San Juan de Mata district location in Costa Rica
- Coordinates: 9.8330499°N 84.5272909°W
- Country: Costa Rica
- Province: San José
- Canton: Turrubares

Area
  - Total: 86.17 km^{2} (33.27 sq mi)
- Elevation: 120 m (390 ft)

Population (2011)
  - Total: 1,182
  - Density: 13.72/km^{2} (35.53/sq mi)
- Time zone: UTC−06:00
- Postal code: 11603

San Juan de Mata is a district of the Turrubares canton, in the San José province of Costa Rica.

== Geography ==
San Juan de Mata has an area of 86.17 km^{2} and an elevation of 120 metres.

== Demographics ==
Historical population
Census	Pop.	±% p.a.
1927	1,102	—
1950	3,853	+5.59%
1963	3,703	−0.30%
1973	2,907	−2.39%
1984	2,648	−0.84%
2000	2,725	+0.18%
2011	1,182	−7.31%
2022	1,236	+0.41%
Source: Instituto Nacional de Estadística y Censos; Centro Centroamericano de Población

For the 2011 census, San Juan de Mata had a population of 1,182 inhabitants.

== Transportation ==
=== Road transportation ===
The district is covered by the following road routes:

- National Route 137
- National Route 319
