= Jardín District =

District in Dota canton, San José province, Costa Rica

Jardín
- District
- Interactive map of Jardín
- Jardín district location in Costa Rica
- Coordinates: 9.6938799°N 83.952558°W
- Country: Costa Rica
- Province: San José
- Canton: Dota

Area
  - Total: 32.71 km^{2} (12.63 sq mi)
- Elevation: 2,221 m (7,287 ft)

Population (2011)
  - Total: 524
  - Density: 16.0/km^{2} (41.5/sq mi)
- Time zone: UTC−06:00
- Postal code: 11702

Jardín is a district of the Dota canton, in the San José province of Costa Rica.

== Geography ==
Jardín has an area of 32.71 km^{2} and an elevation of 2,221 metres.

== Demographics ==
Historical population
Census	Pop.	±% p.a.
1927	162	—
1950	203	+0.99%
1963	219	+0.59%
1973	428	+6.93%
1984	368	−1.36%
2000	475	+1.61%
2011	524	+0.90%
2022	843	+4.42%
Source: Instituto Nacional de Estadística y Censos; Centro Centroamericano de Población

For the 2011 census, Jardín had a population of 524 inhabitants.

== Transportation ==
=== Road transportation ===
The district is covered by the following road routes:

- National Route 226
