= San Pedro District, Turrubares =

District in Turrubares canton, San José province, Costa Rica

San Pedro
- District
- San Pedro district
- San Pedro district location in Costa Rica
- Coordinates: 9.8698758°N 84.4585092°W
- Country: Costa Rica
- Province: San José
- Canton: Turrubares

Area
  - Total: 39.11 km^{2} (15.10 sq mi)
- Elevation: 326 m (1,070 ft)

Population (2011)
  - Total: 646
  - Density: 16.5/km^{2} (42.8/sq mi)
- Time zone: UTC−06:00
- Postal code: 11602

San Pedro is a district of the Turrubares canton, in the San José province of Costa Rica.

== Geography ==
San Pedro has an area of 39.11 km^{2} and an elevation of 326 metres.

== Demographics ==
Historical population
Census	Pop.	±% p.a.
1927	465	—
1950	630	+1.33%
1963	559	−0.92%
1973	624	+1.11%
1984	595	−0.43%
2000	499	−1.09%
2011	646	+2.37%
2022	806	+2.03%
Source: Instituto Nacional de Estadística y Censos; Centro Centroamericano de Población

For the 2011 census, San Pedro had a population of 646 inhabitants.

== Transportation ==
=== Road transportation ===
The district is covered by the following road routes:

- National Route 137
- National Route 319
