= Santa Cruz District, León Cortés Castro =

District in León Cortés Castro canton, San José province, Costa Rica

Santa Cruz
- District
- Santa Cruz district
- Santa Cruz district location in Costa Rica
- Coordinates: 9.7250602°N 84.0112333°W
- Country: Costa Rica
- Province: San José
- Canton: León Cortés Castro

Area
  - Total: 21.97 km^{2} (8.48 sq mi)
- Elevation: 1,650 m (5,410 ft)

Population (2011)
  - Total: 1,665
  - Density: 75.79/km^{2} (196.3/sq mi)
- Time zone: UTC−06:00
- Postal code: 12005

Santa Cruz is a district of the León Cortés Castro canton, in the San José province of Costa Rica.

== Geography ==
Santa Cruz has an area of 21.97 km^{2} and an elevation of 1,650 metres.

== Locations ==
- Poblados (villages): Cedral (part), Lucha (part), San Martín, Rincón Gamboa

== Demographics ==
Historical population
Census	Pop.	±% p.a.
1950	303	—
1963	1,022	+9.80%
1973	1,556	+4.29%
1984	1,503	−0.31%
2000	1,626	+0.49%
2011	1,665	+0.22%
2022	2,246	+2.76%
Source: Instituto Nacional de Estadística y Censos; Centro Centroamericano de Población

For the 2011 census, Santa Cruz had a population of 1,665 inhabitants.

== Transportation ==
=== Road transportation ===
The district is covered by the following road routes:

- National Route 226
