= San Luis District, Turrubares =

District in Turrubares canton, San José province, Costa Rica

San Luis
- District
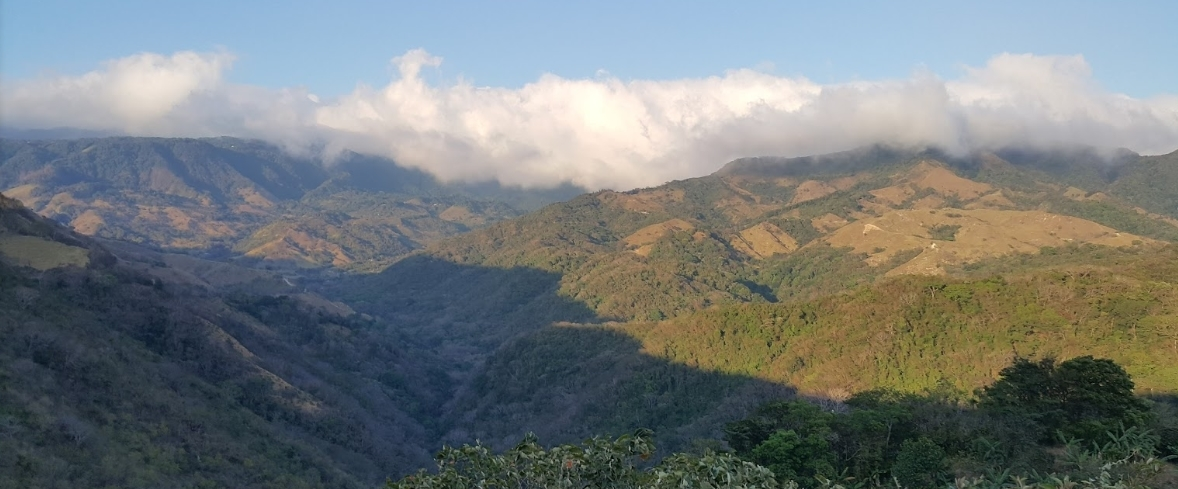
- Mountains of San Luis, Turrubares.
- San Luis district
- San Luis district location in Costa Rica
- Coordinates: 9.8343718°N 84.4715567°W
- Country: Costa Rica
- Province: San José
- Canton: Turrubares

Area
  - Total: 43.71 km^{2} (16.88 sq mi)
- Elevation: 306 m (1,004 ft)

Population (2011)
  - Total: 517
  - Density: 11.8/km^{2} (30.6/sq mi)
- Time zone: UTC−06:00
- Postal code: 11604

San Luis is a district of the Turrubares canton, in the San José province of Costa Rica.

== Geography ==
San Luis has an area of 43.71 km^{2} and an elevation of 306 metres.

== Demographics ==
Historical population
Census	Pop.	±% p.a.
1927	459	—
1950	763	+2.23%
1963	450	−3.98%
1973	476	+0.56%
1984	473	−0.06%
2000	461	−0.16%
2011	517	+1.05%
2022	397	−2.37%
Source: Instituto Nacional de Estadística y Censos; Centro Centroamericano de Población

For the 2011 census, San Luis had a population of 517 inhabitants.

== Transportation ==
=== Road transportation ===
The district is covered by the following road routes:

- National Route 319
