= Tarbaca =

District in Aserrí canton, San José province, Costa Rica

- District
- Tarbaca district
- Tarbaca district location in Costa Rica
- Coordinates: 9.8253163°N 84.1127623°W
- Country: Costa Rica
- Province: San José
- Canton: Aserrí

Area
  - Total: 15.33 km^{2} (5.92 sq mi)
- Elevation: 1,798 m (5,899 ft)

Population (2011)
  - Total: 1,446
  - Density: 94.32/km^{2} (244.3/sq mi)
- Time zone: UTC−06:00
- Postal code: 10602

Tarbaca is a district of the Aserrí canton, in the San José province of Costa Rica.

== Geography ==
Tarbaca has an area of 15.33 km^{2} and an elevation of 1,798 metres.

== Demographics ==
Historical population
Census	Pop.	±% p.a.
1883	186	—
1892	366	+7.81%
1927	645	+1.63%
1950	535	−0.81%
1963	576	+0.57%
1973	805	+3.40%
1984	899	+1.01%
2000	1,231	+1.98%
2011	1,446	+1.47%
2022	1,848	+2.26%
Source: Instituto Nacional de Estadística y Censos; Centro Centroamericano de Población

For the 2011 census, Tarbaca had a population of 1,446 inhabitants.

== Transportation ==
=== Road transportation ===
The district is covered by the following road routes:

- National Route 209
- National Route 222
