= San Carlos District =

San Carlos District may refer to:

- San Carlos District, Bongará, in Bongará Province, Amazonas Region, Peru
- San Carlos District, Panama, in the West Panamá Province in Panama
- San Carlos District, Tarrazú, in Tarrazú (canton), San José Province, Costa Rica

== See also ==
- San Carlos (disambiguation)
