= Llano Bonito District =

District in León Cortés Castro canton, San José province, Costa Rica

Llano Bonito
- District
- Interactive map of Llano Bonito
- Llano Bonito district location in Costa Rica
- Coordinates: 9.6742001°N 84.12003°W
- Country: Costa Rica
- Province: San José
- Canton: León Cortés Castro

Area
  - Total: 34.51 km^{2} (13.32 sq mi)
- Elevation: 1,780 m (5,840 ft)

Population (2011)
  - Total: 2,111
  - Density: 61.17/km^{2} (158.4/sq mi)
- Time zone: UTC−06:00
- Postal code: 12003

Llano Bonito is a district of the León Cortés Castro canton, in the San José province of Costa Rica.

== Geography ==
Llano Bonito has an area of 34.51 km^{2} and an elevation of 1,780 metres.

== Locations ==
- Poblados (villages): Bajo Mora, Bajo Venegas (part), Concepción, San Francisco, San Luis, San Rafael Abajo, Santa Juana, Santa Rosa (part)

== Demographics ==
Historical population
Census	Pop.	±% p.a.
1950	781	—
1963	1,289	+3.93%
1973	1,645	+2.47%
1984	1,497	−0.85%
2000	2,135	+2.24%
2011	2,111	−0.10%
2022	1,931	−0.81%
Source: Instituto Nacional de Estadística y Censos; Centro Centroamericano de Población

For the 2011 census, Llano Bonito had a population of 2,111 inhabitants.

== Transportation ==
=== Road transportation ===
The district is covered by the following road routes:

- National Route 313
