= National Route 315 (Costa Rica) =

National Road Route in Costa Rica

National Tertiary Route 315
- Ruta nacional terciaria 315

Route information
- Maintained by Ministry of Public Works and Transport
- Length: 14.965 km (9.299 mi)

Location
- Country: Costa Rica
- Provinces: San José, Cartago

Highway system
- National Road Network of Costa Rica
← Route 314	→ Route 316

National Tertiary Route 315, or just Route 315 (Spanish: Ruta Nacional Terciaria 315, or Ruta 315) is a National Road Route of Costa Rica located in the San José and Cartago provinces.

== Description ==
In San José province the route covers Dota canton (Santa María, Copey districts).

In Cartago province the route covers El Guarco canton (San Isidro district).
