= San Lorenzo District, Tarrazú =

District in Tarrazú canton, San José province, Costa Rica

San Lorenzo
- District
- San Lorenzo district
- San Lorenzo district location in Costa Rica
- Coordinates: 9.5536969°N 84.0395611°W
- Country: Costa Rica
- Province: San José
- Canton: Tarrazú
- Creation: 26 September 1923

Area
  - Total: 185.64 km^{2} (71.68 sq mi)
- Elevation: 1,440 m (4,720 ft)

Population (2011)
  - Total: 4,394
  - Density: 23.67/km^{2} (61.30/sq mi)
- Time zone: UTC−06:00
- Postal code: 10502

San Lorenzo is a district of the Tarrazú canton, in the San José province of Costa Rica.

== History ==
San Lorenzo was created on 26 September 1923 by Acuerdo 419.

== Geography ==
San Lorenzo has an area of 185.64 km^{2} and an elevation of 1,440 metres.

== Demographics ==
Historical population
Census	Pop.	±% p.a.
1883	79	—
1927	1,829	+7.40%
1950	1,573	−0.65%
1963	2,055	+2.08%
1973	2,732	+2.89%
1984	2,391	−1.20%
2000	4,029	+3.32%
2011	4,394	+0.79%
2022	4,796	+0.80%
Source: Instituto Nacional de Estadística y Censos; Centro Centroamericano de Población

For the 2011 census, San Lorenzo had a population of 4,394 inhabitants.

== Transportation ==
=== Road transportation ===
The district is covered by the following road routes:

- National Route 303
