= Bozzoli =

Bozzoli is a surname. Notable people with the surname include:

- Belinda Bozzoli (1945–2020), South African author, academic, sociologist, and politician
- Maria Eugenia Bozzoli (born 1935), Costa Rican anthropologist, sociologist, and human rights activist
