= San Isidro District, León Cortés Castro =

District in León Cortés Castro canton, San José province, Costa Rica

San Isidro
- District
- San Isidro district
- San Isidro district location in San José Province San Isidro district location in Costa Rica
- Coordinates: 9.6765675°N 84.0813539°W
- Country: Costa Rica
- Province: San José
- Canton: León Cortés Castro

Area
  - Total: 18.86 km^{2} (7.28 sq mi)
- Elevation: 1,640 m (5,380 ft)

Population (2011)
  - Total: 1,531
  - Density: 81.18/km^{2} (210.2/sq mi)
- Time zone: UTC−06:00
- Postal code: 12004

San Isidro is a district of the León Cortés Castro canton, in the San José province of Costa Rica.

== Geography ==
San Isidro has an area of 18.86 km^{2} and an elevation of 1,640 metres.

== Locations ==
- Poblados (villages): Alto Carrizal, Loma de la Altura, Santa Rosa (part), Trinidad

== Demographics ==
Historical population
Census	Pop.	±% p.a.
1950	416	—
1963	707	+4.16%
1973	981	+3.33%
1984	1,138	+1.36%
2000	1,426	+1.42%
2011	1,531	+0.65%
2022	1,515	−0.10%
Source: Instituto Nacional de Estadística y Censos; Centro Centroamericano de Población

For the 2011 census, San Isidro had a population of 1,531 inhabitants.

== Transportation ==
=== Road transportation ===
The district is covered by the following road routes:

- National Route 313
