= National Route 226 (Costa Rica) =

National Road Route in Costa Rica

National Secondary Route 226
- Ruta nacional secundaria 226

Route information
- Maintained by Ministry of Public Works and Transport
- Length: 40.745 km (25.318 mi)

Location
- Country: Costa Rica
- Provinces: San José, Cartago

Highway system
- National Road Network of Costa Rica
← Route 225	→ Route 227

National Secondary Route 226, or just Route 226 (Spanish: Ruta Nacional Secundaria 226, or Ruta 226) is a National Road Route of Costa Rica, located in the San José and Cartago provinces.

== Description ==
In San José province the route covers Desamparados canton (San Cristóbal district), Tarrazú canton (San Marcos district), Dota canton (Santa María and Jardín districts), and León Cortés Castro canton (San Pablo, San Andrés, Santa Cruz, and San Antonio districts).

In Cartago province the route covers El Guarco canton (San Isidro district).
