= León Cortés Castro (canton) =

Canton in San José province, Costa Rica

- Canton
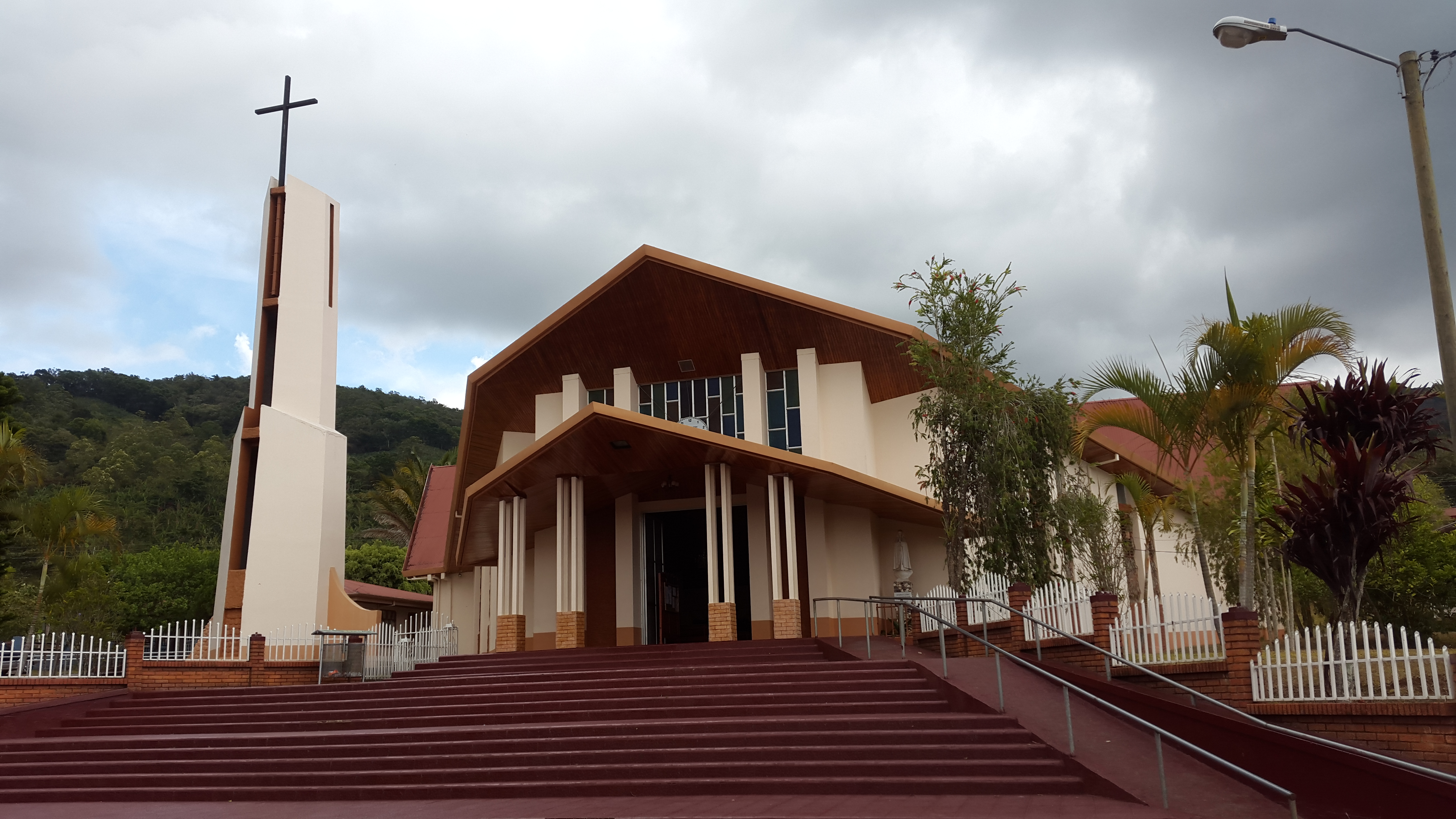
- San Pablo Church

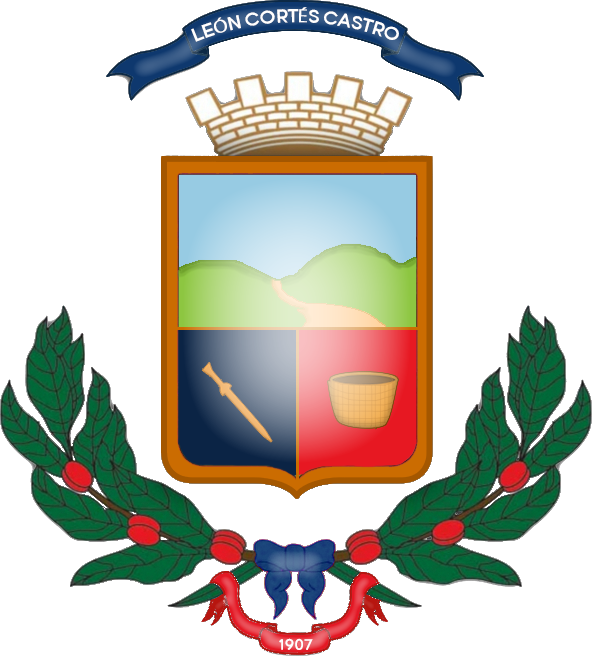
- Seal
- Interactive map of León Cortés Castro
- León Cortés Castro location in San José Province León Cortés Castro canton location in Costa Rica
- Coordinates: 9.6944066°N 84.062347°W
- Country: Costa Rica
- Province: San José
- Creation: 12 June 1962
- Head city: San Pablo
- Districts: Districts: San Pablo; San Andrés; Llano Bonito; San Isidro; Santa Cruz; San Antonio

Government
  - Type: Municipality
  - Body: Municipalidad de León Cortés Castro

Area
  - Total: 120.8 km^{2} (46.6 sq mi)
- Elevation: 1,620 m (5,310 ft)

Population (2011)
  - Total: 12,200
  - Density: 101/km^{2} (262/sq mi)
- Time zone: UTC−06:00
- Canton code: 120
- Website: munileco.go.cr

León Cortés Castro is a canton in the San José province of Costa Rica. The head city of the canton is San Pablo.

It is part of Los Santos Zone, together with Dota and Tarrazú.

== Toponymy ==
It is named in honor of former President León Cortés Castro of Costa Rica.

== History ==
León Cortés Castro was created on 12 June 1962 by decree 11.

The Supreme Elections Tribunal of Costa Rica in a resolution of March 29, 1962, proclaimed the results of a plebiscite in the previous month that created the canton. An executive decree on June 12 delineated the portions of the surrounding cantons of Aserrí, Tarrazú, Dota and Desamparados that were to be included in the new canton.

== Geography ==
León Cortés Castro has an area of 120.8 km² and a mean elevation of 1,620 metres.

The Delicias creek and the Pirrís river form major portions of the western and southern boundary, and the Tarrazú river establishes the northern and eastern limits of the canton.

== Districts ==
The canton of León Cortés Castro is subdivided into the following districts:

1. San Pablo
2. San Andrés
3. Llano Bonito
4. San Isidro
5. Santa Cruz
6. San Antonio

== Demographics ==
Historical population
Census	Pop.	±% p.a.
1963	5,650	—
1973	7,521	+2.90%
1984	8,087	+0.66%
2000	11,696	+2.33%
2011	12,200	+0.38%
2022	13,553	+0.96%
Source: Instituto Nacional de Estadística y Censos; Centro Centroamericano de Población

For the 2011 census, León Cortés Castro had a population of 12,200 inhabitants.

== Transportation ==
=== Road transportation ===
The canton is covered by the following road routes:

- National Route 226
- National Route 313
- National Route 336
