= National Route 336 (Costa Rica) =

National Road Route in Costa Rica

National Tertiary Route 336
- Ruta nacional terciaria 336

Route information
- Maintained by Ministry of Public Works and Transport
- Length: 10.990 km (6.829 mi)

Location
- Country: Costa Rica
- Provinces: San José

Highway system
- National Road Network of Costa Rica
← Route 335	→ Route 401

National Tertiary Route 336, or just Route 336 (Spanish: Ruta Nacional Terciaria 336, or Ruta 336) is a National Road Route of Costa Rica in San José province.

== Description ==
In San José province the route covers Aserrí canton (Monterrey district), León Cortés Castro canton (San Andrés, San Antonio districts).
