= National Route 209 (Costa Rica) =

National Road Route in Costa Rica

National Secondary Route 209
- Ruta nacional secundaria 209
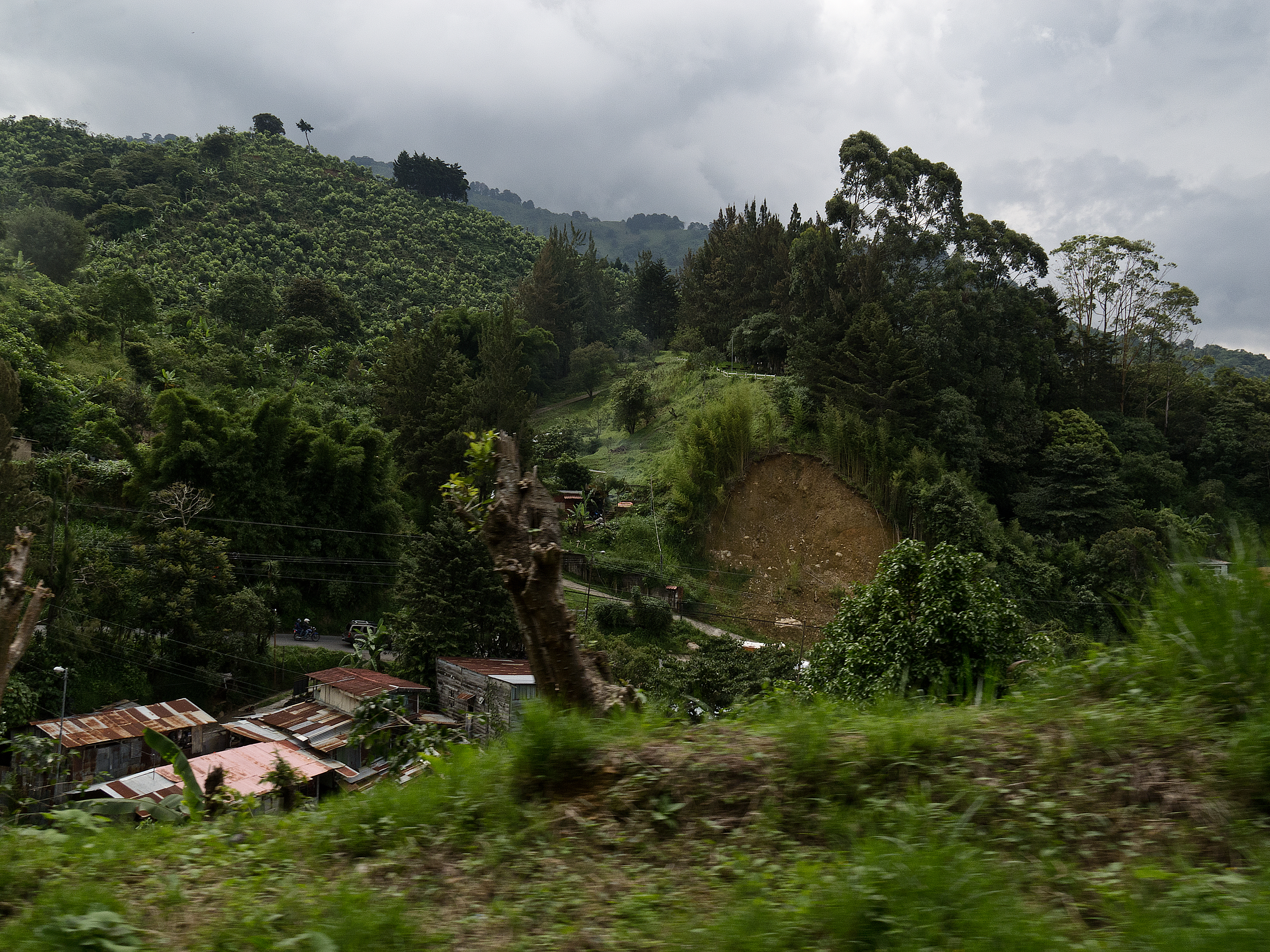
- Aserrí mountains as seen from Route 209

Route information
- Maintained by Ministry of Public Works and Transport
- Length: 46.895 km (29.139 mi)

Location
- Country: Costa Rica
- Provinces: San José

Highway system
- National Road Network of Costa Rica
← Route 207	→ Route 210

National Secondary Route 209, or just Route 209 (Spanish: Ruta Nacional Secundaria 209, or Ruta 209) is a National Road Route of Costa Rica, located in the San José province.

== Description ==
In San José province the route covers San José canton (Catedral, San Francisco de Dos Ríos, and San Sebastián districts), Desamparados canton (Desamparados and San Rafael Arriba districts), Aserrí canton (Aserrí, Tarbaca, Vuelta de Jorco, San Gabriel, and Salitrillos districts), Mora canton (Guayabo, Tabarcia, and Jaris districts), and Acosta canton (San Ignacio and Palmichal districts).
