= National Route 320 (Costa Rica) =

National Road Route in Costa Rica

National Tertiary Route 320
- Ruta nacional terciaria 320

Route information
- Maintained by Ministry of Public Works and Transport
- Length: 17.825 km (11.076 mi)

Location
- Country: Costa Rica
- Provinces: San José, Puntarenas

Highway system
- National Road Network of Costa Rica
← Route 319	→ Route 321

National Tertiary Route 320, or just Route 320 (Spanish: Ruta Nacional Terciaria 320, or Ruta 320) is a National Road Route of Costa Rica, located in the San José, Puntarenas provinces.

== Description ==
In San José province the route covers Turrubares canton (Carara district).

In Puntarenas province the route covers Garabito canton (Tárcoles district).
