= San Marcos, Costa Rica =

District in Tarrazú canton, San José province, Costa Rica

San Marcos
- District
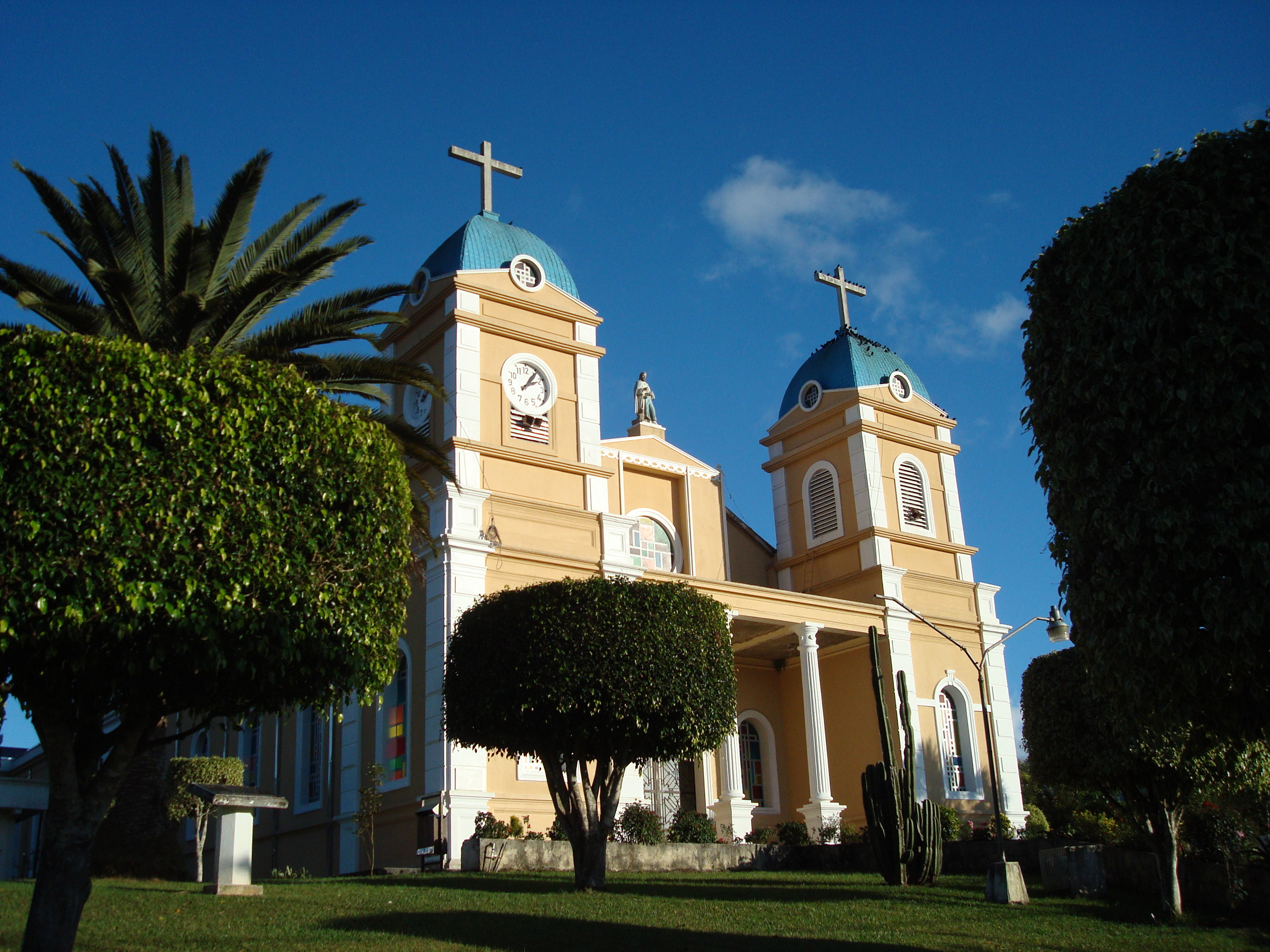
- San Marcos de Tarrazu Roman Catholic church, Costa Rica
- San Marcos district
- San Marcos district location in Costa Rica
- Coordinates: 9.6703061°N 84.0091815°W
- Country: Costa Rica
- Province: San José
- Canton: Tarrazú
- Creation: 3 August 1938

Area
  - Total: 45.53 km^{2} (17.58 sq mi)
- Elevation: 1,429 m (4,688 ft)

Population (2011)
  - Total: 9,993
  - Density: 219.5/km^{2} (568.5/sq mi)
- Time zone: UTC−06:00
- Postal code: 10501

San Marcos is a district and the head city of the canton of Tarrazú in the province of San José in Costa Rica.

== History ==
The city was founded in the 1820s by agricultural migrants from the Central Valley. The region's earliest residents were dedicated to growing basic foodstuffs, namely beans, corn, and sugarcane. Local farmers started growing coffee in the highland valley in the 1890s. The region is best known for its high quality coffee.

== Geography ==
San Marcos has an area of 45.53 km^{2} and a mean elevation of 1,429 metres.

It is located in a mountainous area known as Los Santos Zone, 70 kilometers south of the national capital city of San José.

San Marcos de Tarrazu is located in the north bank of the Pirris River, in a highland valley surrounded by mountains that are part of the Talamanca Sierra in southern Costa Rica. Downtown San Marcos is 1350 meters above sea level but is surrounded by peaks as high as 3000 meters above sea level.

Its geography is suited to growing coffee, mostly because the slopes of the mountains face the morning light and the cloud cover protects the coffee trees in the afternoon. The red soil found in the valley is of volcanic origin. All this plus the altitude make ideal conditions to grow the coffees harvested by locals.

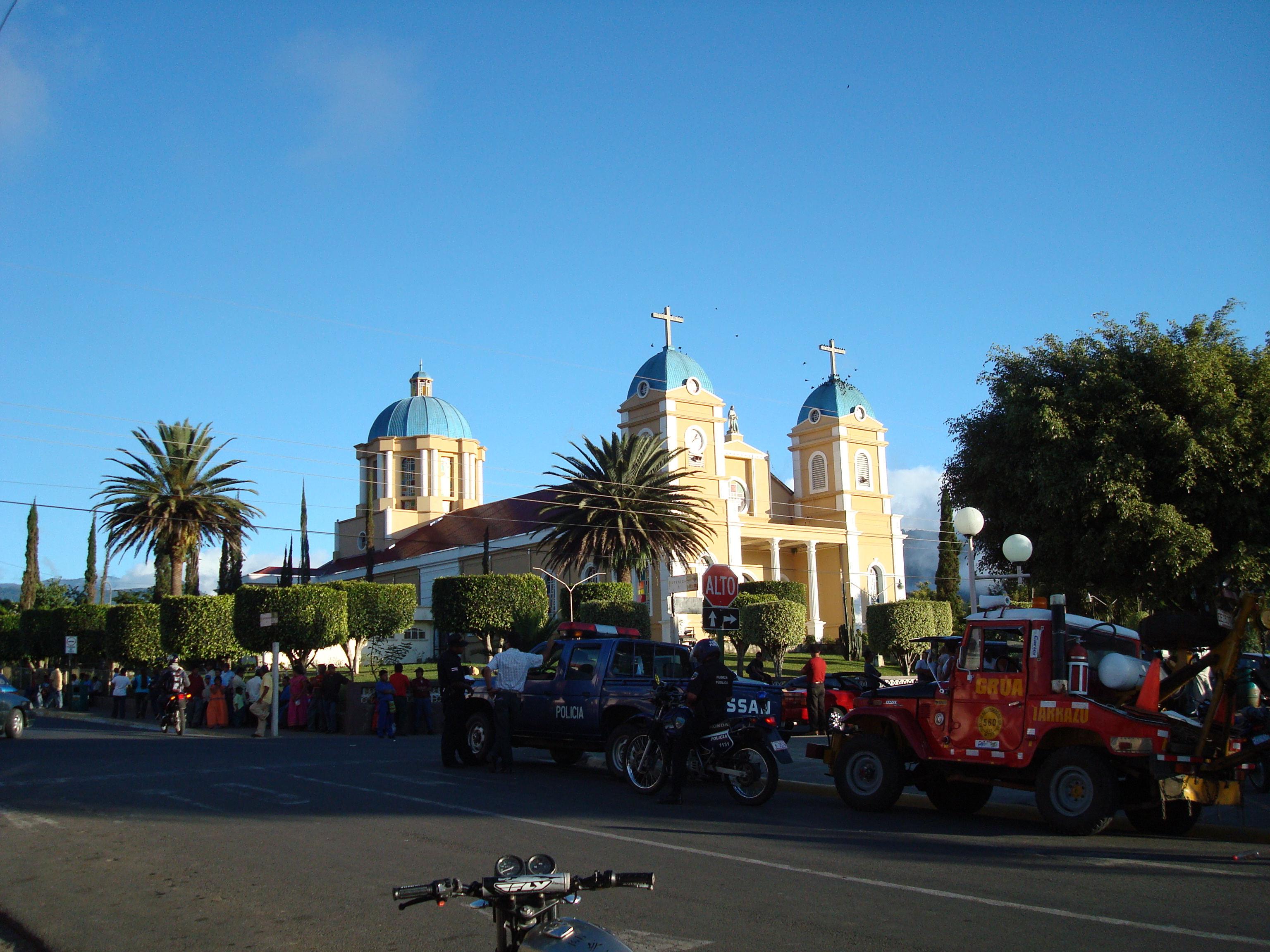
Downtown San Marcos de Tarrazu - Catholic Church in the background

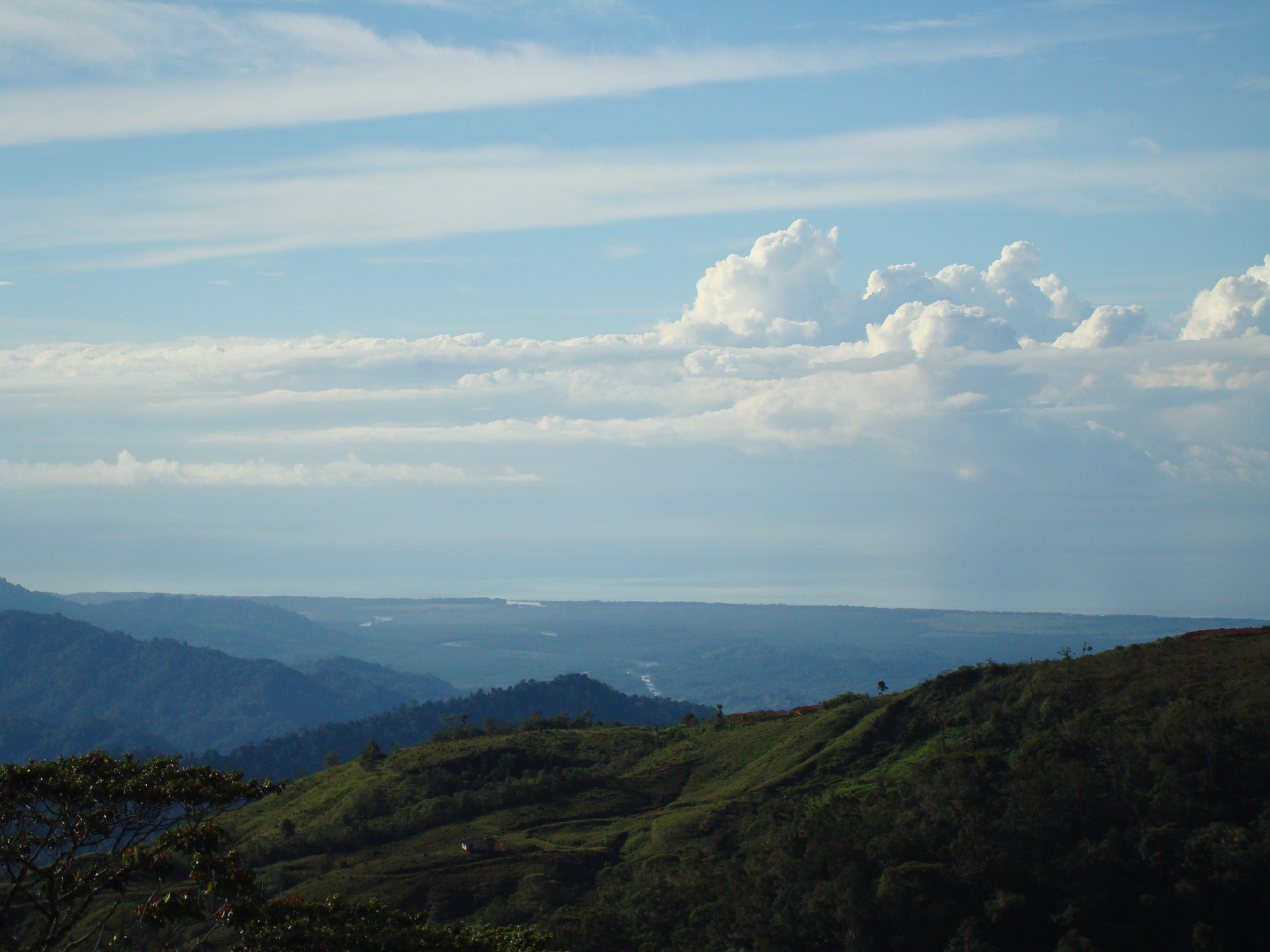
Concepcion de Tarrazu highlands near Quepos Port, Costa Rica

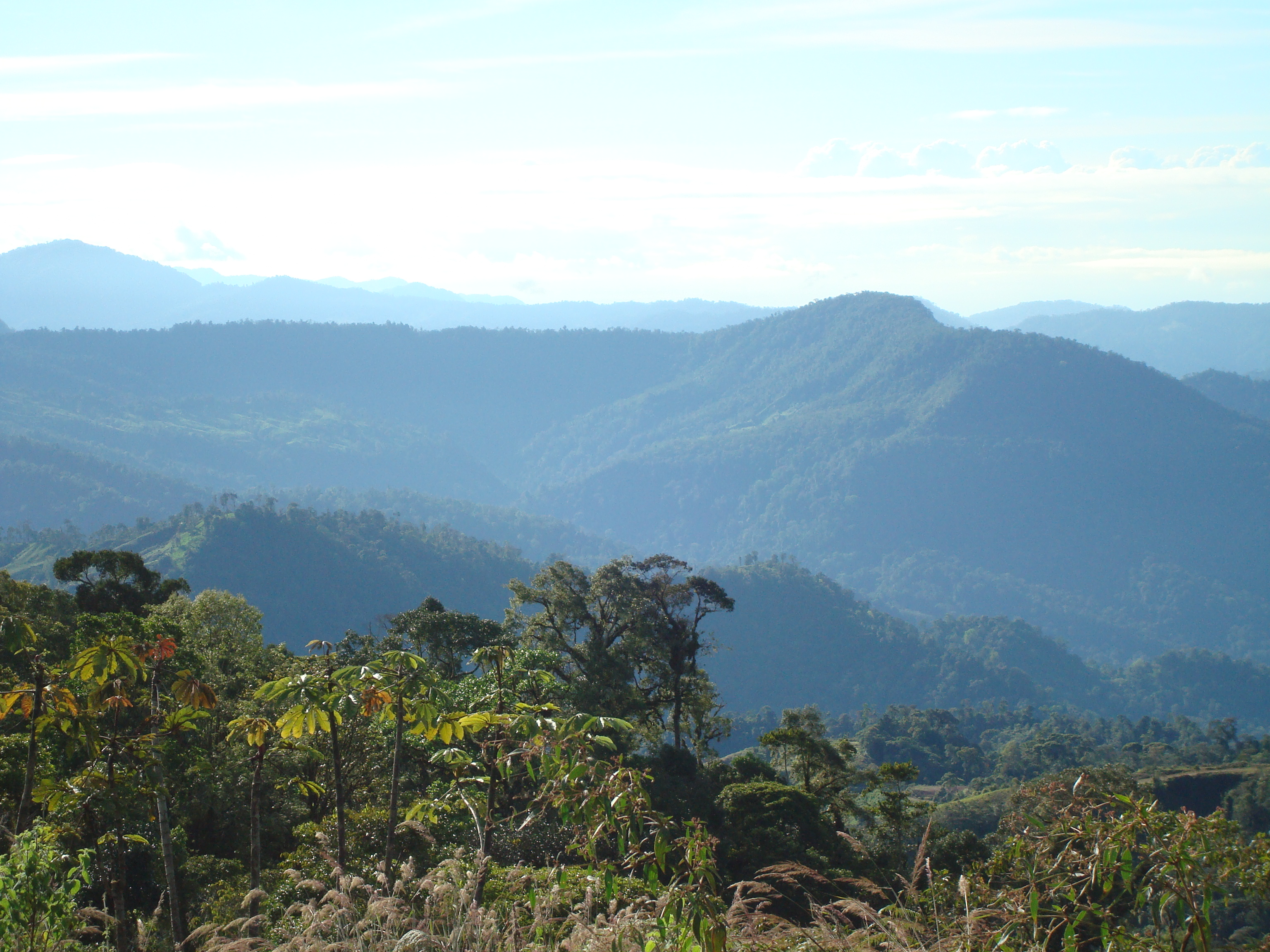
Naranjillo de Tarrazu, as seen from Concepcion, near Port Quepos

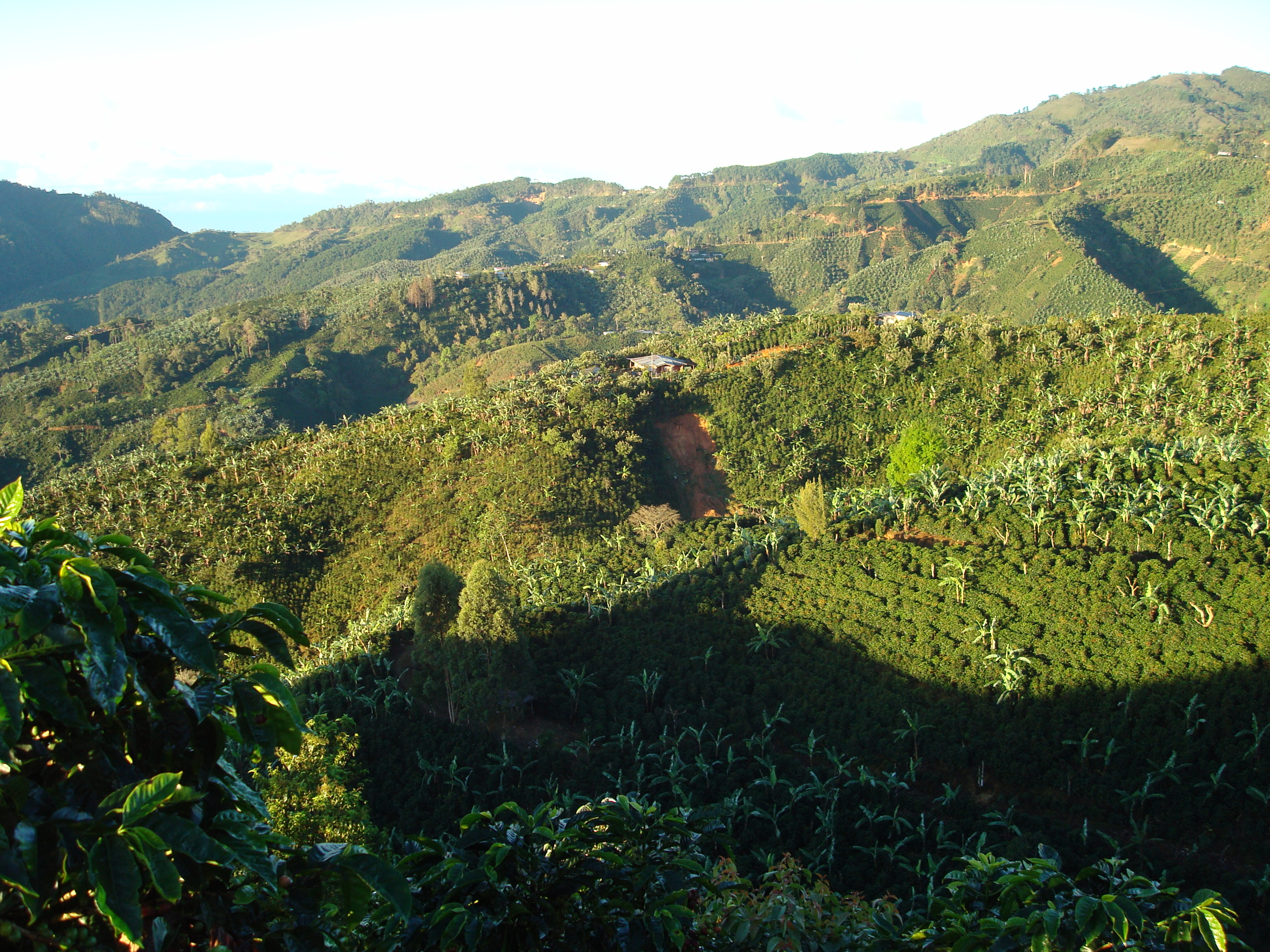
Coffee fields Quebrada Honda de Tarrazu

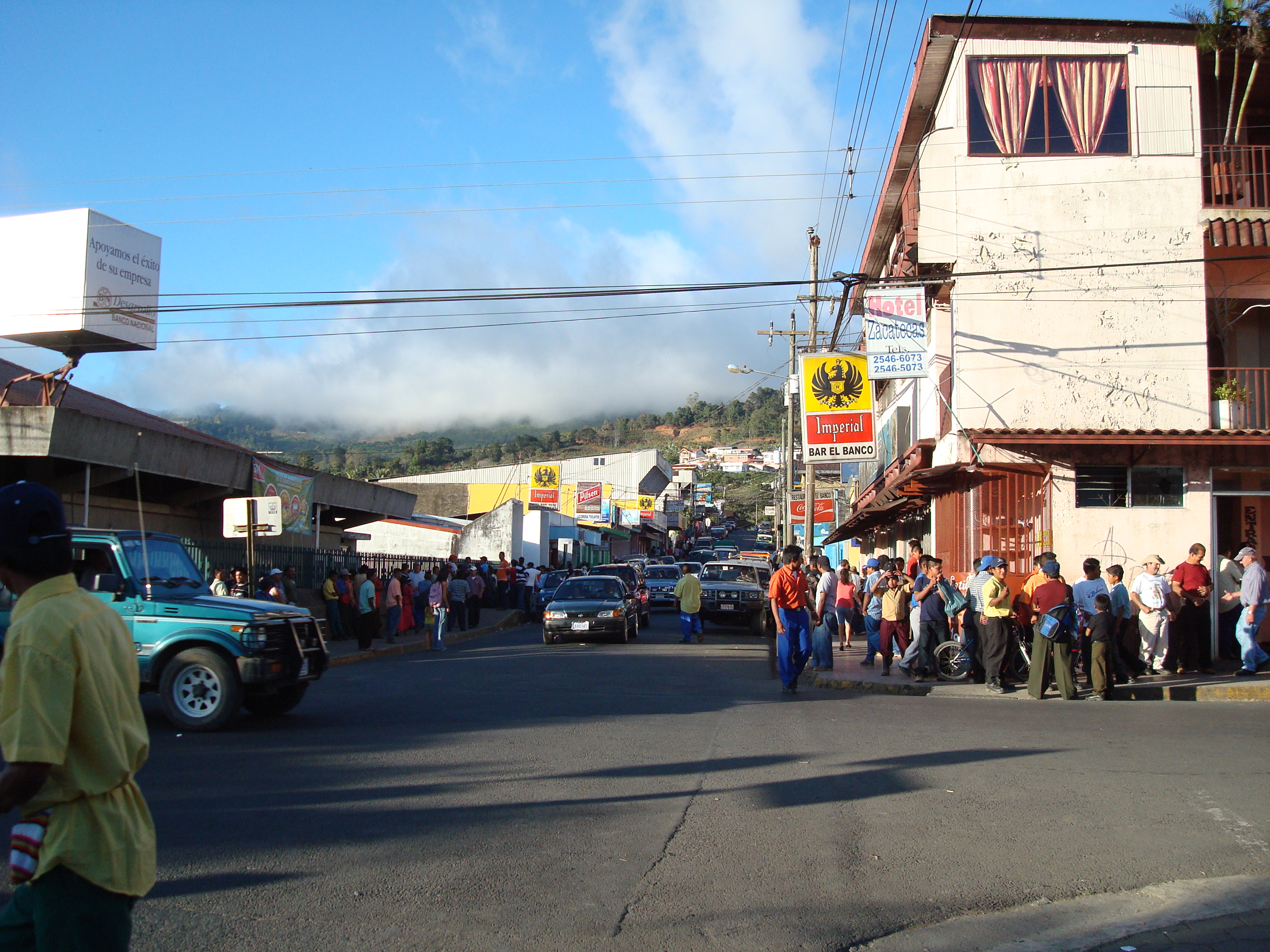
Downtown San Marcos de Tarrazu National bank branch to the left and the popular "Bar El Banco" to the right, in a busy December afternoon

== Politics ==
This region has a deep-seated political relationship with the Liberación Nacional political party that stems back to the 1948 Civil War. Jose "Pepe" Figueres and his troops were not only headquartered in the neighboring community of Santa Maria de Dota, but the main concentration camp of political prisoners for these forces was housed in San Marcos' school. Moreover, a vast majority of Figueres' foot soldiers were from the present-day cantons of Tarrazu, Dota, and Leon Cortes. Furthermore, most of Figueres' workers at his cabuya hacienda, "La Lucha Sin Fin," were from this same region.

== Economy ==
Traditionally, cultural and economic progress have been directly tied to the coffee industry. More recently, however, other agricultural products, namely avocados, have helped farmers keep afloat in years of coffee decline. Perhaps the key reason this region has managed to retain its coffee production, while other regions in Costa Rica have been unable to do so has been immigration. Indeed, since the 1960s this region has exported a considerable percentage of its workforce to the United States.

== Transportation ==
=== Road transportation ===
The district is covered by the following road routes:

- National Route 226
- National Route 303

== Flora and fauna ==
The district of San Lorenzo has been almost overlooked by coffee farmers mostly because of its lowlands and tropical weather. However, more recently tourism has flourished thanks to its pristine forests and clean rivers, the proximity to the Quepos plains, and Manuel Antonio National Park. Giant pre-historic ferns and hardwoods can be found here. Birds such as the Quetzal and small mammals are abundant.

== Demographics ==
Historical population
Census	Pop.	±% p.a.
1883	552	—
1892	815	+4.42%
1927	1,639	+2.02%
1950	1,900	+0.64%
1963	2,546	+2.28%
1973	3,838	+4.19%
1984	5,381	+3.12%
2000	8,240	+2.70%
2011	9,993	+1.77%
2022	10,674	+0.60%
Source: Instituto Nacional de Estadística y Censos; Centro Centroamericano de Población

For the 2011 census, San Marcos had a population of 9,993 inhabitants. The majority of its people grow coffee in the mountains surrounding the city. San Marcos de Tarrazú has been known in the green coffee trade industry as a source of coffee beans. Nearby towns of Santa Maria and San Pablo are also sources of specialty coffee beans. Roman Catholics comprise approx. 90% of the local population. Due to coffee picking, Nicaraguans and Panamanian Native Americans are settling in the valley in record numbers.

== Culture ==
Local culture varies little from that of the rest of Costa Rica, in that the Catholic Church and the Costa Rican state both play a critical role in determining days of celebration. Indeed, the annual Patron Saints' Day Festival is both a civic and a religious event. Whereas much of Costa Rica has allowed the cultural importance of coffee production to decline, this region is deeply wedded to this crops' production. This is evident in the fact that a majority of the region's children continue to pick coffee, a custom that has largely gone out of fashion in the Central Valley where coffee picking is almost entirely done by foreign laborers, namely Nicaraguans. The region has a number of bars, dance halls, and brothels but few other spaces for leisure activity.

== Notable people ==
- Maria Eugenia Bozzoli (born 1935), anthropologist
