= San Andrés District, León Cortés Castro =

District in León Cortés Castro canton, San José province, Costa Rica

San Andrés
- District
- San Andrés district
- San Andrés district location in Costa Rica
- Coordinates: 9.7240855°N 84.0759995°W
- Country: Costa Rica
- Province: San José
- Canton: León Cortés Castro

Area
  - Total: 16.08 km^{2} (6.21 sq mi)
- Elevation: 1,340 m (4,400 ft)

Population (2011)
  - Total: 1,578
  - Density: 98.13/km^{2} (254.2/sq mi)
- Time zone: UTC−06:00
- Postal code: 12002

San Andrés is a district of the León Cortés Castro canton, in the San José province of Costa Rica.

== Geography ==
San Andrés has an area of 16.08 km^{2} and an elevation of 1,340 metres.

== Locations ==
- Poblados (villages): Angostura (part), Bajo Gamboa, Higuerón, Llano Grande, Ojo de Agua (part), Rastrojales

== Demographics ==
Historical population
Census	Pop.	±% p.a.
1892	204	—
1927	638	+3.31%
1950	830	+1.15%
1963	1,048	+1.81%
1973	1,236	+1.66%
1984	1,417	+1.25%
2000	1,804	+1.52%
2011	1,578	−1.21%
2022	1,798	+1.19%
Source: Instituto Nacional de Estadística y Censos; Centro Centroamericano de Población

For the 2011 census, San Andrés had a population of 1,578 inhabitants.

== Transportation ==
=== Road transportation ===
The district is covered by the following road routes:

- National Route 226
- National Route 336
