= National Route 303 (Costa Rica) =

National Road Route in Costa Rica

National Tertiary Route 303
- Ruta nacional terciaria 303

Route information
- Maintained by Ministry of Public Works and Transport
- Length: 16.400 km (10.190 mi)

Location
- Country: Costa Rica
- Provinces: San José

Highway system
- National Road Network of Costa Rica
← Route 301	→ Route 304

National Tertiary Route 303, or just Route 303 (Spanish: Ruta Nacional Terciaria 303, or Ruta 303) is a National Road Route of Costa Rica, located in the San José province.

== Description ==
In San José province the route covers Tarrazú canton (San Marcos, San Lorenzo, and San Carlos districts).
