= National Route 312 (Costa Rica) =

National Road Route in Costa Rica

National Tertiary Route 312
- Ruta nacional terciaria 312

Route information
- Maintained by Ministry of Public Works and Transport
- Length: 1.255 km (0.780 mi)

Location
- Country: Costa Rica
- Provinces: San José

Highway system
- National Road Network of Costa Rica
← Route 311	→ Route 313

National Tertiary Route 312, or just Route 312 (Spanish: Ruta Nacional Terciaria 312, or Ruta 312) is a National Road Route of Costa Rica, located in the San José province.

== Description ==
In San José province the route covers Aserrí canton (Aserrí district).
