= Legua District =

District in Aserrí canton, San José province, Costa Rica

Legua
- District
- Interactive map of Legua
- Legua district location in Costa Rica
- Coordinates: 9.6875163°N 84.1581001°W
- Country: Costa Rica
- Province: San José
- Canton: Aserrí

Area
  - Total: 81.51 km^{2} (31.47 sq mi)
- Elevation: 1,649 m (5,410 ft)

Population (2011)
  - Total: 1,521
  - Density: 18.66/km^{2} (48.33/sq mi)
- Time zone: UTC−06:00
- Postal code: 10605

Legua is a district of the Aserrí canton, in the San José province of Costa Rica.

== Geography ==
Legua has an area of 81.51 km^{2} and an elevation of 1,649 metres.

== Demographics ==
Historical population
Census	Pop.	±% p.a.
1892	321	—
1927	727	+2.36%
1950	1,349	+2.72%
1963	2,062	+3.32%
1973	1,236	−4.99%
1984	1,446	+1.44%
2000	1,472	+0.11%
2011	1,521	+0.30%
2022	1,549	+0.17%
Source: Instituto Nacional de Estadística y Censos; Centro Centroamericano de Población

For the 2011 census, Legua had a population of 1,521 inhabitants.

== Transportation ==
=== Road transportation ===
The district is covered by the following road routes:

- National Route 313
