= San Antonio District, León Cortés Castro =

District in León Cortés Castro canton, San José province, Costa Rica

San Antonio
- District
- San Antonio district
- San Antonio district location in Costa Rica
- Coordinates: 9.723326°N 84.0522354°W
- Country: Costa Rica
- Province: San José
- Canton: León Cortés Castro
- Creation: 7 November 1995

Area
  - Total: 10.15 km^{2} (3.92 sq mi)
- Elevation: 1,770 m (5,810 ft)

Population (2011)
  - Total: 1,106
  - Density: 109.0/km^{2} (282.2/sq mi)
- Time zone: UTC−06:00
- Postal code: 12006

San Antonio is a district of the León Cortés Castro canton, in the San José province of Costa Rica.

== History ==
San Antonio was created on 7 November 1995 by Decreto Ejecutivo 24769-G .

== Geography ==
San Antonio has an area of 10.15 km^{2} and an elevation of 1,770 metres.

== Locations ==
- Poblados (villages): Angostura (part), Cuesta

== Demographics ==
Historical population
Census	Pop.	±% p.a.
2000	925	—
2011	1,106	+1.64%
2022	1,177	+0.57%
Source: Instituto Nacional de Estadística y Censos; Centro Centroamericano de Población

For the 2011 census, San Antonio had a population of 1,106 inhabitants.

== Transportation ==
=== Road transportation ===
The district is covered by the following road routes:

- National Route 226
- National Route 336
