= National Route 319 (Costa Rica) =

National Road Route in Costa Rica

National Tertiary Route 319
- Ruta nacional terciaria 319

Route information
- Maintained by Ministry of Public Works and Transport
- Length: 61.310 km (38.096 mi)

Location
- Country: Costa Rica
- Provinces: San José

Highway system
- National Road Network of Costa Rica
← Route 318	→ Route 320

National Tertiary Route 319, or just Route 319 (Spanish: Ruta Nacional Terciaria 319, or Ruta 319) is a National Road Route of Costa Rica located in the San José province.

== Description ==
In San José province the route covers Puriscal canton (Chires district), Turrubares canton (San Pedro, San Juan de Mata, San Luis, Carara districts).
