= Aserrí District =

District in San José province, Costa Rica

Aserrí
- District
- Interactive map of Aserrí
- Aserrí district location in Costa Rica
- Coordinates: 9.8536736°N 84.1078075°W
- Country: Costa Rica
- Province: San José
- Canton: Aserrí

Area
  - Total: 15.25 km^{2} (5.89 sq mi)
- Elevation: 1,308 m (4,291 ft)

Population (2011)
  - Total: 28,191
  - Density: 1,849/km^{2} (4,788/sq mi)
- Time zone: UTC−06:00
- Postal code: 10601

Aserrí is a district of the Aserrí canton, in the San José province of Costa Rica.

== Name ==
Aserrí takes its name from a Huetar tribe, also called the Accerri.

== Geography ==
Aserrí has an area of 15.25 km^{2} and an elevation of 1,308 metres.

== Demographics ==
Historical population
Census	Pop.	±% p.a.
1864	713	—
1883	1,037	+1.99%
1892	1,239	+2.00%
1927	2,711	+2.26%
1950	3,541	+1.17%
1963	5,778	+3.84%
1973	11,653	+7.27%
1984	20,968	+5.49%
2000	23,844	+0.81%
2011	28,191	+1.53%
2022	29,112	+0.29%
Source: Instituto Nacional de Estadística y Censos; Centro Centroamericano de Población

For the 2011 census, Aserrí had a population of 28,191 inhabitants.

== Transportation ==
=== Road transportation ===
The district is covered by the following road routes:

- National Route 209
- National Route 217
- National Route 312
