= San Pablo District, Turrubares =

District in Turrubares canton, San José province, Costa Rica

San Pablo
- District
- San Pablo district
- San Pablo district location in Costa Rica
- Coordinates: 9.9047417°N 84.4551652°W
- Country: Costa Rica
- Province: San José
- Canton: Turrubares

Area
  - Total: 26.37 km^{2} (10.18 sq mi)
- Elevation: 375 m (1,230 ft)

Population (2011)
  - Total: 1,357
  - Density: 51.46/km^{2} (133.3/sq mi)
- Time zone: UTC−06:00
- Postal code: 11601

San Pablo is a district of the Turrubares canton, in the San José province of Costa Rica.

== Geography ==
San Pablo has an area of 26.37 km^{2} and an elevation of 375 metres.

== Demographics ==
Historical population
Census	Pop.	±% p.a.
1892	690	—
1927	716	+0.11%
1950	691	−0.15%
1963	784	+0.98%
1973	702	−1.10%
1984	755	+0.66%
2000	1,192	+2.90%
2011	1,357	+1.19%
2022	1,587	+1.43%
Source: Instituto Nacional de Estadística y Censos; Centro Centroamericano de Población

For the 2011 census, San Pablo had a population of 1,357 inhabitants.

== Transportation ==
=== Road transportation ===
The district is covered by the following road routes:

- National Route 137
- National Route 707
