= National Route 313 (Costa Rica) =

National Road Route in Costa Rica

National Tertiary Route 313
- Ruta nacional terciaria 313

Route information
- Maintained by Ministry of Public Works and Transport
- Length: 37.700 km (23.426 mi)

Location
- Country: Costa Rica
- Provinces: San José

Highway system
- National Road Network of Costa Rica
← Route 312	→ Route 314

National Tertiary Route 313, or just Route 313 (Spanish: Ruta Nacional Terciaria 313, or Ruta 313) is a National Road Route of Costa Rica, located in the San José province.

== Description ==
In San José province the route covers Aserrí canton (San Gabriel, Legua, Monterrey districts), León Cortés Castro canton (San Pablo, Llano Bonito, San Isidro districts).
