= Turrubares (canton) =

Canton in San José province, Costa Rica

- Canton
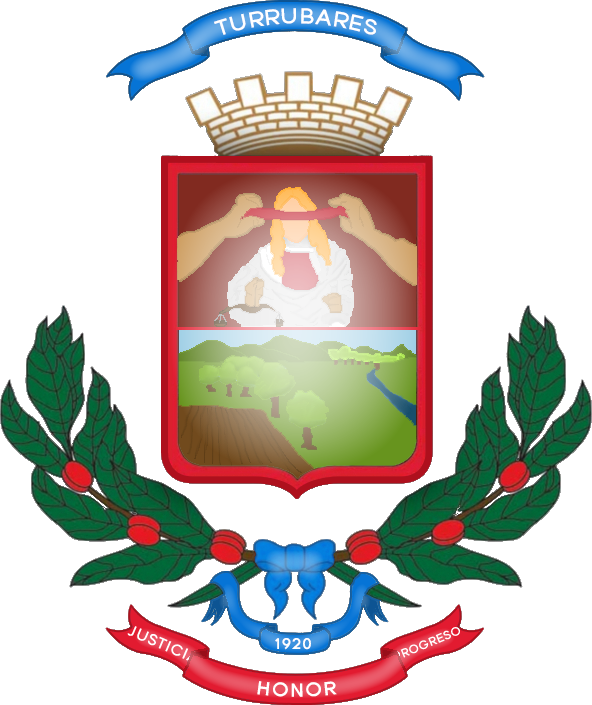
- Flag Seal
- Turrubares canton
- Turrubares canton location in San José Province Turrubares canton location in Costa Rica
- Coordinates: 9.7474683°N 84.4975157°W
- Country: Costa Rica
- Province: San José
- Creation: 30 July 1920
- Head city: San Pablo
- Districts: Districts: San Pablo; San Pedro; San Juan de Mata; San Luis; Carara

Government
  - Type: Municipality
  - Body: Municipalidad de Turrubares
  - Mayor: Martin Vargas Calderón (UP)

Area
  - Total: 416.25 km^{2} (160.72 sq mi)
- Elevation: 313 m (1,027 ft)

Population (2011)
  - Total: 5,512
  - Estimate (2022): 6,173
  - Density: 13.24/km^{2} (34.30/sq mi)
- Time zone: UTC−06:00
- Canton code: 116
- Website: www.turrubares.go.cr

Turrubares is a canton in the San José province of Costa Rica.

== History ==
Turrubares was created on 30 July 1920 by decree 56.

== Government ==
=== Mayor ===
According to Costa Rica's Municipal Code, mayors are elected every four years by the population of the canton. As of the latest municipal elections in 2024, the United We Can (UP) candidate, Martin Vargas Calderón, was elected mayor of the canton with 46.64% of the votes, with Kattia Chacón Rodríguez and Luis Mariano Vargas Rojas as first and second vice mayors, respectively.

Mayors of Turrubares since the 2002 elections
Period	Name	Party
2002–2006	Roberto González Cordero	PUSC
2006–2010	Rafael Vindas Vindas	PUSC
2010–2016	Bolívar Monge Granados	PLN
2016–2020	Giovanni Madrigal Ramírez	PLN
2020–2024	Giovanni Madrigal Ramírez	PCU
2024–2028	Martin Vargas Calderón	UP

=== Municipal Council ===
Like the mayor and vice mayors, members of the Municipal Council (called regidores) are elected every four years. Turrubares' Municipal Council has 5 seats for regidores and their substitutes, who can participate in meetings but not vote unless the owning regidor (regidor propietario) is absent. The Municipal Council's composition for the 2024–2028 period is as follows:

Composition of the Municipal Council of Turrubares after the 2024 municipal elections
Political parties in the Municipal Council of Turrubares
Political party	Regidores		
Political party	№	Owner	Substitute
United We Can (UP)	2	Manuel Rodrigo González Castro	Edwin Chaves Chavarría
United We Can (UP)	2	Ana Julia Trejos Arias	Bellanira Pérez Mena
Progressive Liberal Party (PLP)	2	Alexander Jiménez Torres	Didier Valverde Arias
Progressive Liberal Party (PLP)	2	Yorleny Madrigal Ramírez	Vera Cascante Sandí
National Liberation Party (PLN)	1	Virginia Salazar Agüero	Erika Vanessa Salazar Madrigal

== Geography ==
Turrubares has an area of 416.25 km^{2} (160.72 sq mi) and a mean elevation of 313 m (1,027 ft).

The Grande de Tárcoles River delineates the north and northwest boundaries of the canton. The Carara River, Camaronal River and the Fila Negra (Black Mountains) establish the boundary on the west. The south and southwest is marked by the Tulin River, and the Galán River and Azul Creek delineate portions of the canton's border on the east.

== Districts ==
The canton of Turrubares is subdivided into the following districts:

1. San Pablo
2. San Pedro
3. San Juan de Mata
4. San Luis
5. Carara

== Demographics ==
Historical population
Census	Pop.	±% p.a.
1927	2,742	—
1950	5,937	+3.42%
1963	5,496	−0.59%
1973	4,709	−1.53%
1984	4,471	−0.47%
2000	4,877	+0.54%
2011	5,512	+1.12%
2022	6,173	+1.03%
Source: Instituto Nacional de Estadística y Censos; Centro Centroamericano de Población

Turrubares had an estimated population of 6,173 inhabitants in 2022, the second lowest in the country behind Monteverde, and up from 5,512 at the time of the 2011 census.

In 2022, Turrubares had a Human Development Index of 0.712.

== Transportation ==
=== Road transportation ===
The canton is covered by the following road routes:

- National Route 137
- National Route 319
- National Route 320
- National Route 324
- National Route 707
