= San Pablo District, León Cortés Castro =

District in León Cortés Castro canton, San José province, Costa Rica

San Pablo
- District
- San Pablo district
- San Pablo district location in Costa Rica
- Coordinates: 9.6837292°N 84.0451216°W
- Country: Costa Rica
- Province: San José
- Canton: León Cortés Castro

Area
  - Total: 20.86 km^{2} (8.05 sq mi)
- Elevation: 1,542 m (5,059 ft)

Population (2011)
  - Total: 4,209
  - Density: 201.8/km^{2} (522.6/sq mi)
- Time zone: UTC−06:00
- Postal code: 12001

San Pablo is a district of the León Cortés Castro canton, in the San José province of Costa Rica.

== Geography ==
San Pablo has an area of 20.86 km^{2} and an elevation of 1,542 metres.

== Locations ==
- Barrios (neighborhoods): Estadio, La Clara, La Virgen, Los Ángeles, Sagrada Familia
- Poblados (villages): Abejonal, Carrizales, Los Navarro, Montes de Oro, Rosario

== Demographics ==
Historical population
Census	Pop.	±% p.a.
1892	471	—
1927	1,628	+3.61%
1950	1,056	−1.86%
1963	1,584	+3.17%
1973	2,103	+2.87%
1984	2,532	+1.70%
2000	3,780	+2.54%
2011	4,209	+0.98%
2022	4,886	+1.37%
Source: Instituto Nacional de Estadística y Censos; Centro Centroamericano de Población

For the 2011 census, San Pablo had a population of 4,209 inhabitants.

== Transportation ==
=== Road transportation ===
The district is covered by the following road routes:

- National Route 226
- National Route 313
