= San Carlos District, Tarrazú =

District in Tarrazú canton, San José province, Costa Rica

San Carlos
- District
- San Carlos district
- San Carlos district location in Costa Rica
- Coordinates: 9.6086602°N 84.1156709°W
- Country: Costa Rica
- Province: San José
- Canton: Tarrazú

Area
  - Total: 58.58 km^{2} (22.62 sq mi)
- Elevation: 1,545 m (5,069 ft)

Population (2011)
  - Total: 1,893
  - Density: 32.31/km^{2} (83.69/sq mi)
- Time zone: UTC−06:00
- Postal code: 10503

San Carlos is a district of the Tarrazú canton, in the San José province of Costa Rica.

== Geography ==
San Carlos has an area of 58.58 km^{2} and an elevation of 1,545 metres.

== Demographics ==
Historical population
Census	Pop.	±% p.a.
1950	576	—
1963	791	+2.47%
1973	972	+2.08%
1984	1,073	+0.90%
2000	1,891	+3.61%
2011	1,893	+0.01%
2022	2,340	+1.95%
Source: Instituto Nacional de Estadística y Censos; Centro Centroamericano de Población

For the 2011 census, San Carlos had a population of 1,893 inhabitants.

== Transportation ==
=== Road transportation ===
The district is covered by the following road routes:

- National Route 303
