= Dota (canton) =

Canton in San José province, Costa Rica

- Canton
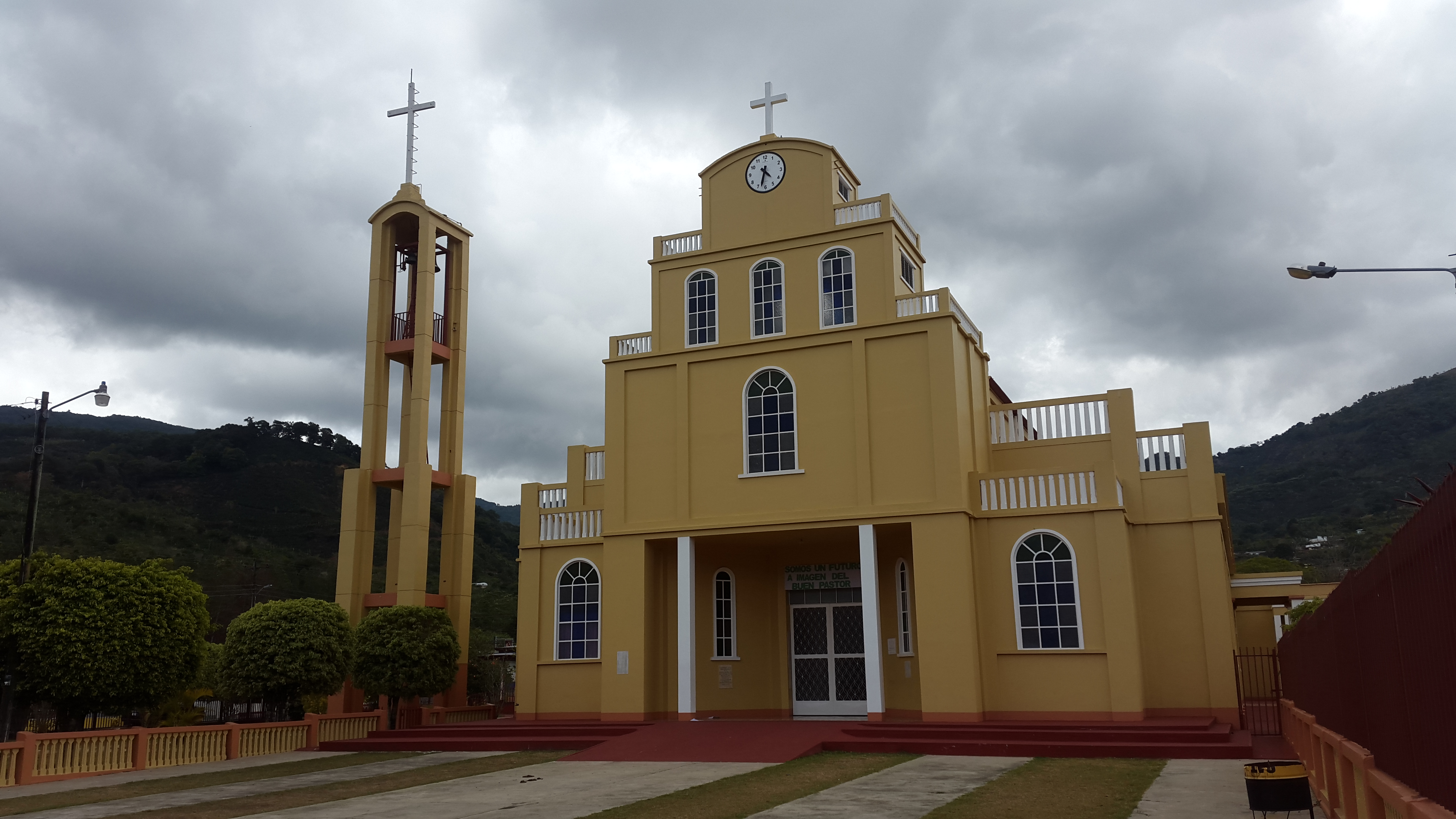
- Santa María de Dota Church

- Flag Seal
- Interactive map of Dota
- Dota canton location in San José Province Dota canton location in Costa Rica
- Coordinates: 9.5847517°N 83.8736707°W
- Country: Costa Rica
- Province: San José
- Creation: 23 July 1925
- Head city: Santa María
- Districts: Districts: Santa María; Jardín; Copey

Government
  - Type: Municipality
  - Body: Municipalidad de Dota
  - Mayor: Adrián Cordero Cordero (PUSC)

Area
  - Total: 404.44 km^{2} (156.16 sq mi)
- Elevation: 1,874 m (6,148 ft)

Population (2011)
  - Total: 6,948
  - Estimate (2022): 9,364
  - Density: 17.18/km^{2} (44.49/sq mi)
- Time zone: UTC−06:00
- Canton code: 117
- Website: www.dota.go.cr

Dota is a canton in the San José province of Costa Rica. The head city of the canton is Santa María.

It is part of Los Santos Zone, together with Tarrazú and León Cortés Castro.

== History ==
Dota was created on 23 July 1925 by decree 80.

== Government ==
=== Mayor ===
According to Costa Rica's Municipal Code, mayors are elected every four years by the population of the canton. As of the latest municipal elections in 2024, the Social Christian Unity Party (PUSC) candidate, Adrián Cordero Cordero, was elected mayor of the canton with 79.33% of the votes, with Susy Calderón Arguedas and Jorge Orlando Serrano Salazar as first and second vice mayors, respectively.

Mayors of Dota since the 2002 elections
Period	Name	Party
2002–2006	Mario Enrique Ureña Rojas	PLN
2006–2010	José Valverde Monge	PLN
2010–2016	Leonardo Chacón Porras (Note: Also legally named Eduardo Chacón Porras.)	PLN
2016–2020	Leonardo Chacón Porras	PLN
2020–2024	Leonardo Chacón Porras	PLN
2024–2028	Adrián Cordero Cordero	PUSC

=== Municipal Council ===
Like the mayor and vice mayors, members of the Municipal Council (called regidores) are elected every four years. Dota's Municipal Council has 5 seats for regidores and their substitutes, who can participate in meetings but not vote unless the owning regidor (regidor propietario) is absent. The Municipal Council's composition for the 2024–2028 period is as follows:

Composition of the Municipal Council of Dota after the 2024 municipal elections
Political parties in the Municipal Council of Dota
Political party	Regidores		
Political party	№	Owner	Substitute
Social Christian Unity Party (PUSC)	4	Ana Vanessa Mata Cordero	Ivonne Fallas Fallas
Social Christian Unity Party (PUSC)	4	Ronald Alberto Calderón Valverde	Enrique Jiménez Hernández (Note: Also legally named Henry Jiménez Hernández.)
Social Christian Unity Party (PUSC)	4	Johanna Patricia Solano Montero	Ana Fiorina Retana Rojas
Social Christian Unity Party (PUSC)	4	Rolando Fonseca Brenes	Edwin Alexander Valverde Elizondo
National Liberation Party (PLN)	1	Johanna Chanto Vargas	Leda Roxana Ureña Brenes

== Geography ==
Dota has an area of 404.44 km^{2} (156.16 sq mi) and a mean elevation of 1,874 m (6,148 ft).

The canton is delineated by the Savegre River on the south and southeast, the Naranjo River on the west and the Cordillera de Talamanca on the north and northeast.

== Districts ==
The canton of Dota is subdivided into the following districts:

1. Santa María
2. Jardín
3. Copey

== Demographics ==
Historical population
Census	Pop.	±% p.a.
1927	4,712	—
1950	2,801	−2.24%
1963	3,718	+2.20%
1973	4,375	+1.64%
1984	4,934	+1.10%
2000	6,519	+1.76%
2011	6,948	+0.58%
2022	9,364	+2.75%
Source: Instituto Nacional de Estadística y Censos; Centro Centroamericano de Población

Dota had an estimated 9,364 inhabitants in 2022, up from 6,948 at the time of the 2011 census.

In 2022, Dota had a Human Development Index of 0.660.

== Transportation ==
=== Road transportation ===
The canton is covered by the following road routes:

- National Route 2
- National Route 226
- National Route 315
