= Aserrí (canton) =

Canton in San José province, Costa Rica

- Canton
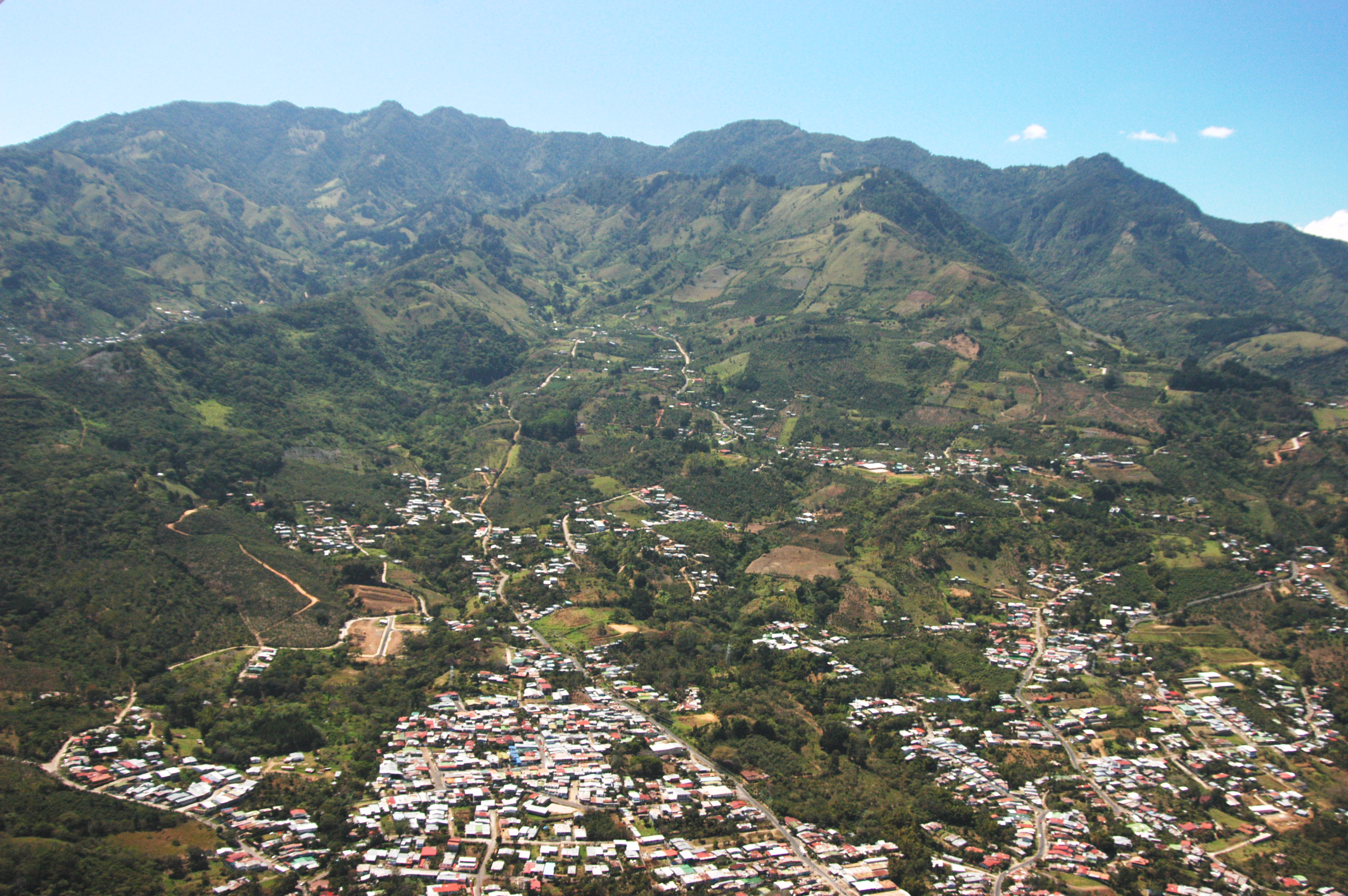
- Panoramic view of Aserrí

- Flag Seal
- Interactive map of Aserrí
- Aserrí canton location in San José Province Aserrí canton location in Costa Rica
- Coordinates: 9.7483631°N 84.1423846°W
- Country: Costa Rica
- Province: San José
- Creation: 27 November 1882
- Head city: Aserrí
- Districts: Districts: Aserrí; Tarbaca; Vuelta de Jorco; San Gabriel; Legua; Monterrey; Salitrillos

Government
  - Type: Municipality
  - Body: Municipalidad de Aserrí
  - Mayor: Patricia Mayela Porras Segura (PLN)

Area
  - Total: 168.26 km^{2} (64.97 sq mi)
- Elevation: 1,373 m (4,505 ft)

Population (2011)
  - Total: 57,892
  - Estimate (2022): 59,588
  - Density: 344.06/km^{2} (891.12/sq mi)
- Time zone: UTC−06:00
- Canton code: 106
- Website: aserri.go.cr

Aserrí is the sixth canton in the San José province of Costa Rica. The head city of the canton is the homonymous Aserrí.

== Name ==
Aserrí takes its name from a Huetar tribe, also called the Accerri.

== Geography ==
Aserrí has an area of 168.26 km^{2} (64.97 sq mi) and a mean elevation of 1,373 m (4,505 ft).

The mountainous canton is delineated on the north by the Poás River. It encompasses a narrow strip of land that traverses the Coastal Mountain Range before reaching the lowlands of Puntarenas Province, bordering the canton of Parrita.

== Government ==
=== Mayor ===
According to Costa Rica's Municipal Code, mayors are elected every four years by the population of the canton. As of the latest municipal elections in 2024, the National Liberation Party candidate, Patricia Mayela Porras Segura, was elected mayor of the canton with 23.75% of the votes, with Carlos Alberto Azofeifa Aguilar and Jesús Benito Morales Calderón as first and second vice mayors, respectively.

Mayors of Aserrí since the 2002 elections
Period	Name	Party
2002–2006	Mario Morales Guzmán	PLN
2006–2010	Mario Morales Guzmán	PLN
2010–2016	Víctor Manuel Morales Mora	PAC
2016–2020	José Oldemar García Segura	PLN
2020–2024	José Oldemar García Segura	PLN
2024–2028	Patricia Mayela Porras Segura	PLN

=== Municipal Council ===
Like the mayor and vice mayors, members of the Municipal Council (called regidores) are elected every four years. Aserrí's Municipal Council has 7 seats for regidores and their substitutes, who can participate in meetings but not vote unless the owning regidor (regidor propietario) is absent. The current president of the Municipal Council is the Social Christian Unity Party member, Sonia Aguilar Zamora, with National Liberation Party member, Alex Antonio Calero Lopez, as vice president. The Municipal Council's composition for the 2024–2028 period is as follows:

Current composition of the Municipal Council of Aserrí after the 2024 municipal elections
Political parties in the Municipal Council of Aserrí
Political party	Regidores		
Political party	№	Owner	Substitute
National Liberation Party (PLN)	2	Jessica Vanessa Fallas Hidalgo	Wendy Solano Mora
National Liberation Party (PLN)	2	Alex Antonio Calero Lopez^{(VP)} (Note: Also legally named Alex Antonio López Zúñiga.)	Franklin Segura Mora
National Democratic Agenda (ADN)	2	Freddy Alberto Sandí Zúñiga	Jorge Chacón Sánchez
National Democratic Agenda (ADN)	2	Manuela Rita Sánchez Monge	Kryssia Marlene Villarreal Quirós
Social Christian Unity Party (PUSC)	2	Sonia Aguilar Zamora^{(P)}	Hillary Valeria Monge Montero
Social Christian Unity Party (PUSC)	2	Francis López Esquivel	Alexander Barboza Barboza
New Generation Party (PNG)	1	Mildred Marcela Zúñiga Corrales	Silvia Marcela Granados Hidalgo

== Districts ==
The canton of Aserrí is subdivided into seven districts:

1. Aserrí
2. Tarbaca
3. Vuelta de Jorco
4. San Gabriel
5. Legua
6. Monterrey
7. Salitrillos

== History ==
The canton was established by a decree of 27 November, 1882.

== Demographics ==
Historical population
Census	Pop.	±% p.a.
1883	4,785	—
1892	6,030	+2.60%
1927	6,592	+0.25%
1950	9,122	+1.42%
1963	13,609	+3.13%
1973	20,091	+3.97%
1984	30,588	+3.90%
2000	49,319	+3.03%
2011	57,892	+1.47%
2022	59,588	+0.26%
Source: Instituto Nacional de Estadística y Censos; Centro Centroamericano de Población

Aserrí had an estimated 59,588 residents in 2022, up from 57,892 at the time of the 2011 census.

In 2022, Aserrí had a Human Development Index of 0.737.

== Transportation ==
=== Road transportation ===
The canton is covered by the following road routes:

- National Route 209
- National Route 217
- National Route 222
- National Route 304
- National Route 312
- National Route 313
- National Route 336
