= Maria Eugenia Bozzoli =

Costa Rican anthropologist, sociologist and activist

María Eugenia Bozzoli (also, María Eugenia Bozzoli Vargas and María Eugenia Bozzoli de Wille; born 26 May 1935, in San Marcos de Tarrazú) is a Costa Rican anthropologist, sociologist and human rights activist. She is one of the founders of anthropology in Costa Rica, as well as the country's first woman anthropologist.

== Early years and education ==
Born in San Marcos de Tarrazú on 26 May 1935, Bozzoli is the daughter of Benilda Vargas Blanco and Fermin Bozzoli Zúñiga. She matriculated from San José's Colegio Superior de Señoritas in 1952. Bozzoli lived in the U.S. state of Kansas for six years in the 1950s during her studies at the University of Kansas (Bachelor's Degree, archaeology; Master's Degree, archaeology).

== Career ==
In 1959, Bozzoli became a professor of cultural anthropology at the University of Costa Rica. The Society for Applied Anthropology, states that she is "known for her defense of the rights of ethnic minorities, her efforts for the recognition, respect and tolerance of cultural diversity, and her advocacy for conservation and sustainable use of the natural environment". Her work has concentrated on investigating the cultural history of the Amerindian indigenous population, and looking for alternatives for national development by studying diversity in her country's past. She is particularly adept at understanding social issues facing her country's indigenous people. As a result, during the course of her career, she has worked with numerous government institutions, including the social welfare institute, the electricity institute regarding issues of resettlement with dam building projects, and the Ministry of Natural Resources to ensure sustainable development in Costa Rica.

Bozzoli earned a Ph.D. in anthropology at the University of Georgia in 1975. Thereafter, she served as Director of the Council and as Vice President of Social Action at the University of Costa Rica (1976–1981). and authored Birth and Death in the Belief System of the Bribri Indians of Costa Rica (1979). In 1981, Bozzoli was awarded a Fulbright fellowship and taught at Louisiana State University. In 1992, she became professor emerita at the University of Costa Rica; in 1998, she was a visiting professor at the University of Kansas; and in 2000, she was elected to the Council of the Universidad Estatal a Distancia. In 1962 Bozzoli began teaching at the Universidad de Costa Rica and remained there.

In 2015, she was a founding member of the Pan-American Academy of the History of Medicine, established at the University of Costa Rica. Since then, she has served on its board of directors as Vice President for the Central America and Caribbean Section.

== Honors ==
Bozzoli, one of the founders of anthropology in Costa Rica, was the country's first woman anthropologist. In 2000, she was awarded the Bronislaw Malinowski Award, and in the following year, she was the Magón National Prize for Culture recipient. The Museo de Culturas Indígenas Doctora María Eugenia Bozzoli, in Puerto Viejo de Sarapiquí, is named in her honor.

== Personal life ==
While studying at the University of Kansas for her bachelor's degree, she met the Costa Rican entomologist, Álvaro Wille Trejos, and they married. Bozzoli's daughter, Leticia, attended the University of Kansas, as did Bozzoli's siblings, Ricardo, Fernando, and Virginia.

== Bibliography ==
- Hartney, Christopher; Tower, Daniel (27 October 2016). Religious Categories and the Construction of the Indigenous. BRILL. ISBN 978-90-04-32898-3.
- Penland, Paige R. (3 November 2008). Explorer's Guide Costa Rica: With Excursions to Nicaragua & Panama: A Great Destination. Countryman Press. ISBN 978-1-58157-097-7.
- Society for Applied Anthropology (2002). Practicing Anthropology. Vol. 24. Society for Applied Anthropology.
