= Santa María District, Dota =

District in Dota canton, San José province, Costa Rica

Santa María
- District
- Santa María district
- Santa María district location in Costa Rica
- Coordinates: 9.5757477°N 83.9594001°W
- Country: Costa Rica
- Province: San José
- Canton: Dota

Area
  - Total: 92.84 km^{2} (35.85 sq mi)
- Elevation: 1,548 m (5,079 ft)

Population (2011)
  - Total: 4,621
  - Density: 49.77/km^{2} (128.9/sq mi)
- Time zone: UTC−06:00
- Postal code: 11701

Santa María is a district of the Dota canton, in the San José province of Costa Rica.

== Geography ==
Santa María has an area of 92.84 km^{2} and an elevation of 1,548 metres.

== Demographics ==
Historical population
Census	Pop.	±% p.a.
1883	51	—
1892	809	+35.95%
1927	1,561	+1.90%
1950	1,645	+0.23%
1963	2,424	+3.03%
1973	2,683	+1.02%
1984	3,324	+1.97%
2000	4,274	+1.58%
2011	4,621	+0.71%
2022	6,030	+2.45%
Source: Instituto Nacional de Estadística y Censos; Centro Centroamericano de Población

For the 2011 census, Santa María had a population of 4,621 inhabitants.

== Transportation ==
=== Road transportation ===
The following road routes cover the district:

- National Route 226
- National Route 315

== Climate ==
Climate data for Santa María
Month	Jan	Feb	Mar	Apr	May	Jun	Jul	Aug	Sep	Oct	Nov	Dec	Year
Mean daily maximum °C (°F)	22.3 (72.1)	23.2 (73.8)	24.0 (75.2)	24.3 (75.7)	24.0 (75.2)	23.1 (73.6)	23.1 (73.6)	23.3 (73.9)	23.2 (73.8)	22.6 (72.7)	22.0 (71.6)	22.0 (71.6)	23.1 (73.6)
Daily mean °C (°F)	17.1 (62.8)	17.7 (63.9)	18.2 (64.8)	18.8 (65.8)	18.8 (65.8)	18.2 (64.8)	18.3 (64.9)	18.2 (64.8)	18.0 (64.4)	17.7 (63.9)	17.3 (63.1)	17.0 (62.6)	17.9 (64.3)
Mean daily minimum °C (°F)	12.0 (53.6)	12.2 (54.0)	12.5 (54.5)	13.4 (56.1)	13.6 (56.5)	13.4 (56.1)	13.6 (56.5)	13.2 (55.8)	12.9 (55.2)	12.9 (55.2)	12.7 (54.9)	12.1 (53.8)	12.9 (55.2)
Average precipitation mm (inches)	48 (1.9)	37 (1.5)	49 (1.9)	113 (4.4)	310 (12.2)	367 (14.4)	268 (10.6)	319 (12.6)	423 (16.7)	421 (16.6)	202 (8.0)	90 (3.5)	2,647 (104.3)
Source: Climate-Data.org
