= Tarrazú (canton) =

Canton in San José province, Costa Rica

- Canton
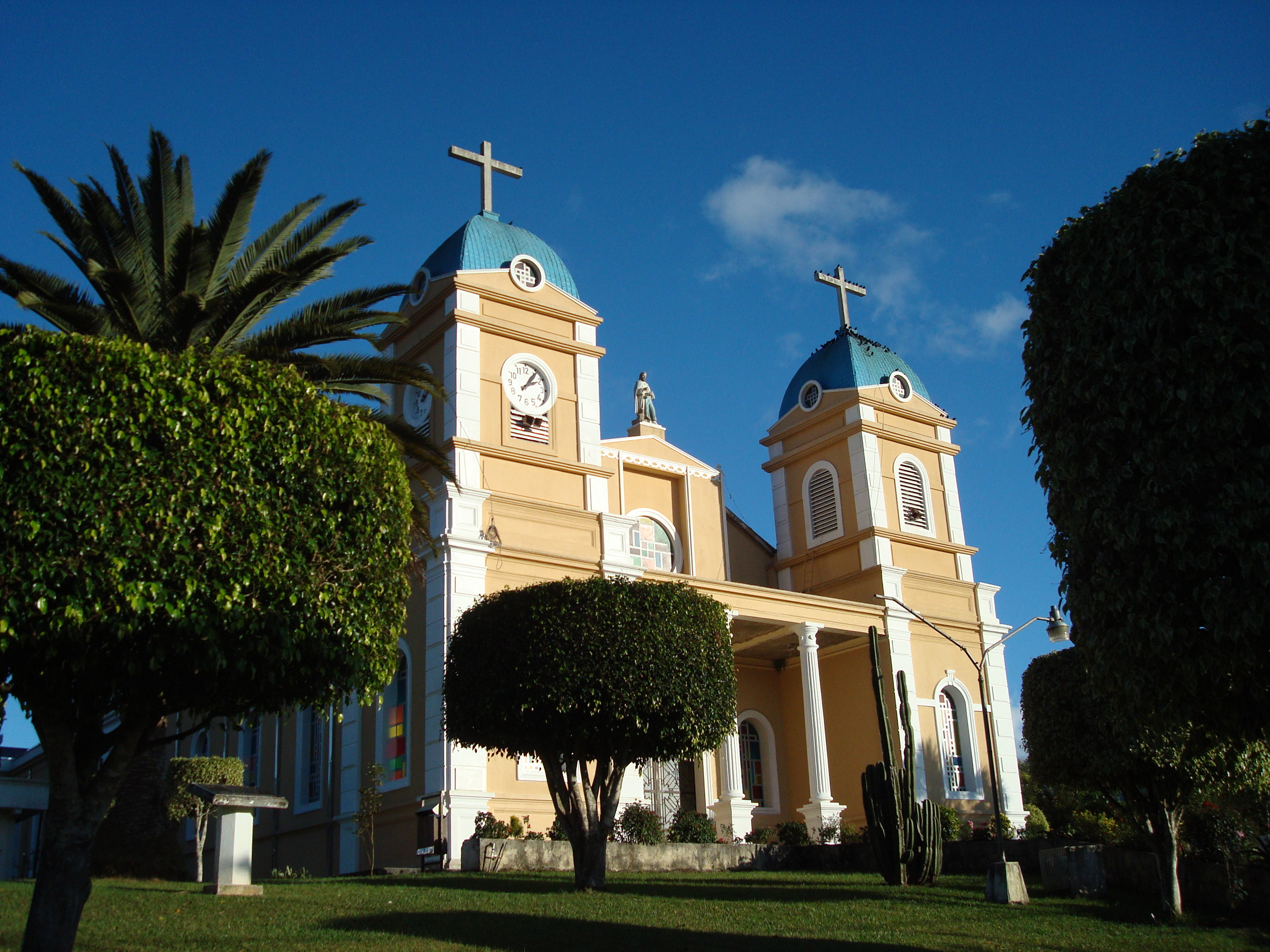
- San Marcos Roman Catholic church

- Flag Seal
- Tarrazú canton
- Tarrazú canton location in San José Province Tarrazú canton location in Costa Rica
- Coordinates: 9.5830753°N 84.064823°W
- Country: Costa Rica
- Province: San José
- Creation: 7 August 1868
- Head city: San Marcos
- Districts: Districts: San Marcos; San Lorenzo; San Carlos

Government
  - Type: Municipality
  - Body: Municipalidad de Tarrazú
  - Mayor: Fernando Portuguez Parra (PUSC)

Area
  - Total: 291.27 km^{2} (112.46 sq mi)
- Elevation: 1,471 m (4,826 ft)

Population (2011)
  - Total: 16,280
  - Estimate (2022): 17,810
  - Density: 55.89/km^{2} (144.8/sq mi)
- Time zone: UTC−06:00
- Canton code: 105
- Website: munitarrazu.cr

Tarrazú is the fifth canton in the province of San José in Costa Rica. The head city of the canton is San Marcos. It is part of Los Santos Zone, together with Dota and León Cortés Castro.

== History ==
The canton was established by a legislative decree of 7 August 1868. It was part of the Desamparados canton by that time.

== Government ==
=== Mayor ===
According to Costa Rica's Municipal Code, mayors are elected every four years by the population of the canton. As of the latest municipal elections in 2024, the Social Christian Unity Party candidate, Fernando Portuguez Parra, was elected mayor of the canton with 50.15% of the votes, with Marjorie Castro Barrantes and Alejandro Javier Bonilla Herrera as first and second vice mayors, respectively.

Mayors of Tarrazú since the 2002 elections
Period	Name	Party
2002–2006	José Rodolfo Naranjo Naranjo	PUSC
2006–2010	Iván Suárez Sandí	PLN
2010–2016	Bernardo Barboza Picado	PLN
2016–2020	Ana Lorena Rovira Gutiérrez	PUSC
2020–2024	Ana Lorena Rovira Gutiérrez	PUSC
2024–2028	Fernando Portuguez Parra	PUSC

=== Municipal Council ===
Like the mayor and vice mayors, members of the Municipal Council (called regidores) are elected every four years. Tarrazú's Municipal Council has 5 seats for regidores and their substitutes, who can participate in meetings but not vote unless the owning regidor (regidor propietario) is absent. The Municipal Council's composition for the 2024–2028 period is as follows:

Current composition of the Municipal Council of Tarrazú after the 2024 municipal elections
Political parties in the Municipal Council of Tarrazú
Political party	Regidores		
Political party	№	Owner	Substitute
Social Christian Unity Party (PUSC)	3	Keisy Daniela Gutiérrez Valverde	María Victoria Naranjo Abarca
Social Christian Unity Party (PUSC)	3	Carlos Luis Abarca Cruz	Juan Diego Blanco Valverde
Social Christian Unity Party (PUSC)	3	Melania Chaves Chanto	Karen Lizeth Vargas Navarro
National Liberation Party (PLN)	2	Karol Tatiana Navarro Monge	María Rosario Umaña Retana
National Liberation Party (PLN)	2	Wilmer Alvarado Fonseca	Isaac Facundo Madrigal Vargas

== Geography ==
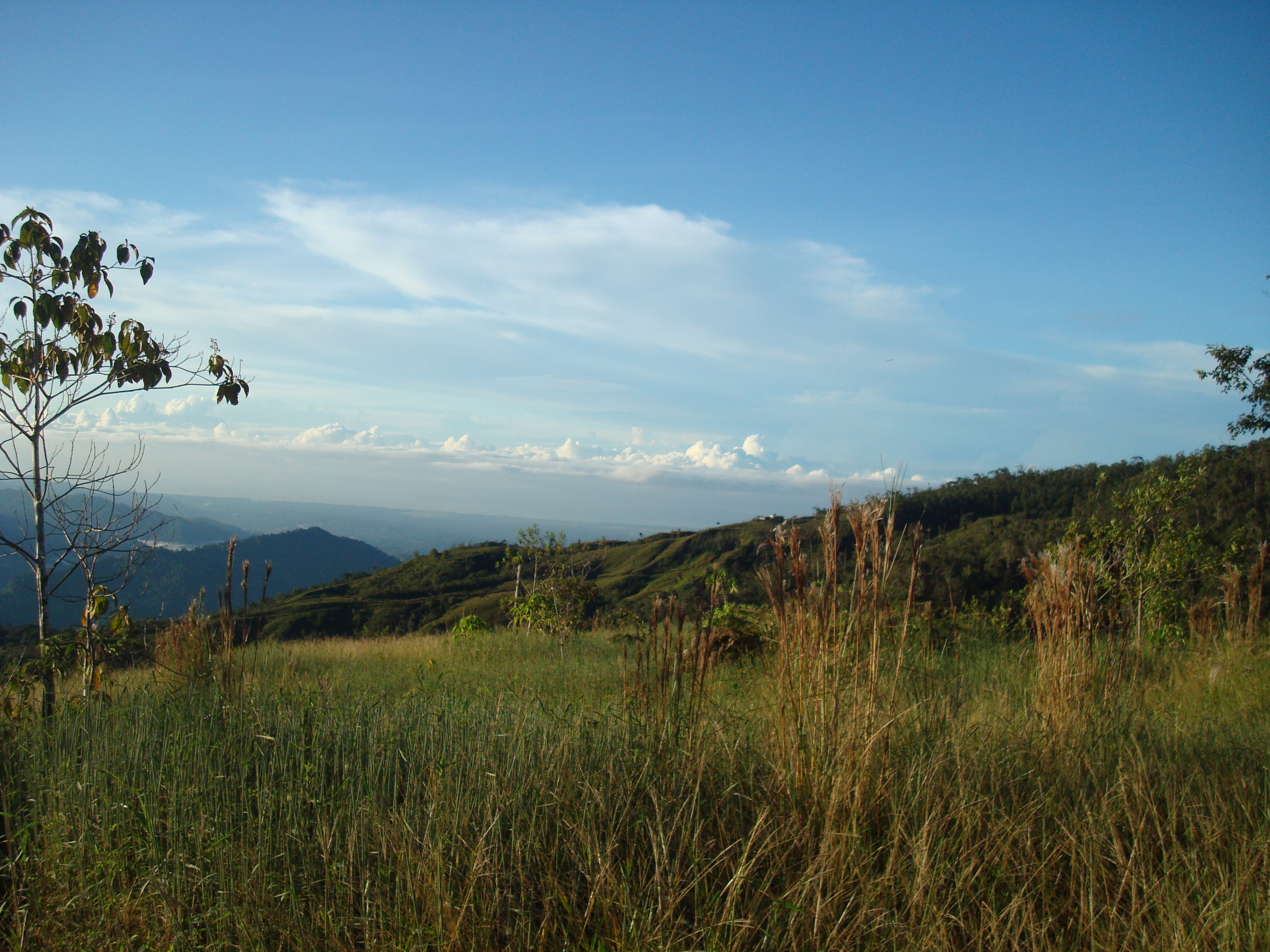
Pacific Ocean in the distance, as seen from Tarrazú.

Tarrazú has an area of 291.27 square kilometres (112.46 sq mi) and a mean elevation of 1,471 metres (4,826 ft).

The Pirrís River (also known as Parrita River) establishes much of the northern boundary of the three-pronged canton, which reaches south across the Coastal Mountain Range to its border with the canton of Quepos in Puntarenas Province.

Tarrazú is located about 70 kilometres (43 mi) south of the capital, San José, in a pristine valley surrounded by mountains that are part of the Talamanca Sierra in southern Costa Rica. Downtown San Marcos is 1,350 metres (4,430 ft) above sea level but is surrounded by peaks as high as 3,000 metres (9,800 ft) above sea level.

== Districts ==
The canton of Tarrazú is subdivided into three districts:

1. San Marcos
2. San Lorenzo
3. San Carlos

== Demographics ==
Historical population
Census	Pop.	±% p.a.
1883	1,378	—
1892	2,583	+7.23%
1927	5,734	+2.30%
1950	7,435	+1.14%
1963	5,392	−2.44%
1973	7,542	+3.41%
1984	8,845	+1.46%
2000	14,160	+2.98%
2011	16,280	+1.28%
2022	17,810	+0.82%
Source: Instituto Nacional de Estadística y Censos; Centro Centroamericano de Población

Tarrazú had an estimated population of 17,810 in 2022, an increase from its 16,280 inhabitants at the time of the 2011 census.

In 2022, Tarrazú had a Human Development Index of 0.668.

== Transportation ==
=== Road transportation ===
The canton is covered by the following road routes:

- National Route 226
- National Route 303

== Economy ==
Highland coffee is the main source of income of local people. However, tourism and avocado production are of increased importance. During the months of December, January and February, population increases three-fold due to harvest time. San Marcos, the biggest town in the region, has become the center of economic activity.

More recently, the Costa Rican Institute of Electricity has invested millions of dollars in the Pirrís Hydro Dam, scheduled to start generating energy by March 2011. The Hydro Dam is now the highest structure of its kind in Central America and will be key to the economic development of the region, not only in the highlands but the coastal regions of Quepos and Parrita.

The region is deeply dependent on remittances from emigres who live in the United States, namely New Jersey. Few households in the region do not have a family member who lives and works in the United States. This outmigration has led to an influx of thousands of Panamanian laborers to help realize the annual coffee harvest.

Tarrazú, particularly the San Lorenzo area, is felt to produce the most desirable coffee in Costa Rica. Finca Palmilera coffee is grown here. In November 2012, it was the most expensive coffee sold in Starbucks coffee shops in the United States.
