= 2011 Costa Rican census =

Costa Rica 2011 Census
- 30 May 2011

General information
- Country: Costa Rica

Results
- Total population: 4,301,712 (▲12.9%)
- Most populous canton: San José; 288,054
- Least populous canton: Turrubares; 5,512

Historical population
Census	Pop.	±% p.a.
1864	120,499	—
1883	182,073	+2.20%
1892	243,205	+3.27%
1927	471,524	+1.91%
1950	800,875	+2.33%
1963	1,336,274	+4.02%
1973	1,871,780	+3.43%
1984	2,416,809	+2.35%
2000	3,810,179	+2.89%
2011	4,301,712	+1.11%
2022	5,044,197	+1.46%
Source: Instituto Nacional de Estadística y Censos; Centro Centroamericano de Población

The 2011 Costa Rican census was undertaken by the National Institute of Statistics and Census (Instituto Nacional de Estadística y Censos (INEC)) in Costa Rica. The semi-autonomous government body, INEC, was created by Census Law No. 7839 on 4 November 1998.

== The census ==
The census took place between Monday, 30 May 2011 and Friday, 3 June 2011 when 35,000 enumerators, mostly teachers, visited an estimated 1,300,000 households to count a population estimated before the census at about 4,650,000 individuals (the census itself counted 4,301,712 people).

The census questionnaire inquired about housing, including the physical and structural characteristics of the house, whether it was owned or rented, and if basic services (water, electricity) were present. The census form also asked about equipment in the house: telephone (mobile and fixed), vehicles, and information technology and communication (radio, television, cable or satellite, computer and internet).

Questions concerning the inhabitants asked about the number of people living in the household, number of households per housing unit, who was the head of the household, family relations between people living in the house, sex, age, and place of birth. Other questions inquired about disabilities and ethnic identification, among other things.

In Costa Rica, tourists and temporary visitors are not counted, but foreigners who have lived there for six months are included. Furthermore, participation is voluntary so residents can refuse to take part and enumerators will accept this response.

Primary school teachers have conducted the census since the 1950s. About 35,000 were needed in 2011 but not all teachers wanted to participate. The numbers were made up by students and statistics undergraduates from the University of Costa Rica, earning ₡50,000 ($100) for a week's work.

The census cost $3.6 million and preliminary results of the count were published in December 2011. It counted 4,301,712 people, an increase of 12.9 percent since the 2000 census.

== Results by canton ==
Province	Cantón	Population as of 2011 census	Population as of 2000 census	Change	Percent change
San José	San José	288,054	309,672	−21,618 ▼	-6.98% ▼
San José	Escazú	56,509	52,372	4,137 ▲	7.90% ▲
San José	Desamparados	208,411	193,478	14,933 ▲	7.72% ▲
San José	Puriscal	33,004	29,407	3,597 ▲	12.23% ▲
San José	Tarrazú	16,280	14,160	2,120 ▲	14.97% ▲
San José	Aserrí	57,892	49,319	8,573 ▲	17.38% ▲
San José	Mora	26,294	21,666	4,628 ▲	21.36% ▲
San José	Goicoechea	115,084	117,532	−2,448 ▼	-2.08% ▼
San José	Santa Ana	49,123	34,507	14,616 ▲	42.36% ▲
San José	Alajuelita	77,603	70,297	7,306 ▲	10.39% ▲
San José	Vázquez de Coronado	60,486	55,585	4,901 ▲	8.82% ▲
San José	Acosta	20,209	18,661	1,548 ▲	8.30% ▲
San José	Tibás	64,842	72,074	−7,232 ▼	-10.03% ▼
San José	Moravia	56,919	50,419	6,500 ▲	12.89% ▲
San José	Montes de Oca	49,132	50,433	−1,301 ▼	-2.58% ▼
San José	Turrubares	5,512	4,877	635 ▲	13.02% ▲
San José	Dota	6,948	6,519	429 ▲	6.58% ▲
San José	Curridabat	65,206	60,889	4,317 ▲	7.09% ▲
San José	Pérez Zeledón	134,534	122,187	12,347 ▲	10.11% ▲
San José	León Cortés Castro	12,200	11,696	504 ▲	4.31% ▲
Alajuela	Alajuela	254,886	222,853	32,033 ▲	14.37% ▲
Alajuela	San Ramón	80,566	67,975	12,591 ▲	18.52% ▲
Alajuela	Grecia	76,898	65,119	11,779 ▲	18.09% ▲
Alajuela	San Mateo	6,136	5,343	793 ▲	14.84% ▲
Alajuela	Atenas	25,460	22,479	2,981 ▲	13.26% ▲
Alajuela	Naranjo	42,713	37,602	5,111 ▲	13.59% ▲
Alajuela	Palmares	34,716	29,766	4,950 ▲	16.63% ▲
Alajuela	Poás	29,199	24,764	4,435 ▲	17.91% ▲
Alajuela	Orotina	20,341	15,705	4,636 ▲	29.52% ▲
Alajuela	San Carlos	163,745	127,140	36,605 ▲	28.79% ▲
Alajuela	Zarcero	12,205	10,845	1,360 ▲	12.54% ▲
Alajuela	Sarchí	18,085	16,239	1,846 ▲	11.37% ▲
Alajuela	Upala	43,953	37,679	6,274 ▲	16.65% ▲
Alajuela	Los Chiles	23,735	19,732	4,003 ▲	20.29% ▲
Alajuela	Guatuso	15,508	13,045	2,463 ▲	18.88% ▲
Cartago	Cartago	147,898	132,057	15,841 ▲	12.00% ▲
Cartago	Paraíso	57,743	52,393	5,350 ▲	10.21% ▲
Cartago	La Unión	99,399	80,279	19,120 ▲	23.82% ▲
Cartago	Jiménez	14,669	14,046	623 ▲	4.44% ▲
Cartago	Turrialba	69,616	68,510	1,106 ▲	1.61% ▲
Cartago	Alvarado	14,312	12,290	2,022 ▲	16.45% ▲
Cartago	Oreamuno	45,473	39,032	6,441 ▲	16.50% ▲
Cartago	El Guarco	41,793	33,788	8,005 ▲	23.69% ▲
Heredia	Heredia	123,616	103,894	19,722 ▲	18.98% ▲
Heredia	Barva	40,660	32,440	8,220 ▲	25.34% ▲
Heredia	Santo Domingo	40,072	34,748	5,324 ▲	15.32% ▲
Heredia	Santa Bárbara	36,243	29,181	7,062 ▲	24.20% ▲
Heredia	San Rafael	45,965	37,293	8,672 ▲	23.25% ▲
Heredia	San Isidro	20,633	16,056	4,577 ▲	28.51% ▲
Heredia	Belén	21,633	19,834	1,799 ▲	9.07% ▲
Heredia	Flores	20,037	15,038	4,999 ▲	33.24% ▲
Heredia	San Pablo	27,671	20,813	6,858 ▲	32.95% ▲
Heredia	Sarapiquí	57,147	45,435	11,712 ▲	25.78% ▲
Guanacaste	Liberia	62,987	46,703	16,284 ▲	34.87% ▲
Guanacaste	Nicoya	50,825	42,189	8,636 ▲	20.47% ▲
Guanacaste	Santa Cruz	55,104	40,821	14,283 ▲	34.99% ▲
Guanacaste	Bagaces	19,536	15,972	3,564 ▲	22.31% ▲
Guanacaste	Carrillo	37,122	27,306	9,816 ▲	35.95% ▲
Guanacaste	Cañas	26,201	24,076	2,125 ▲	8.83% ▲
Guanacaste	Abangares	18,039	16,276	1,763 ▲	10.83% ▲
Guanacaste	Tilarán	19,640	17,871	1,769 ▲	9.90% ▲
Guanacaste	Nandayure	11,121	9,985	1,136 ▲	11.38% ▲
Guanacaste	La Cruz	19,181	16,505	2,676 ▲	16.21% ▲
Guanacaste	Hojancha	7,197	6,534	663 ▲	10.15% ▲
Puntarenas	Puntarenas	115,019	102,504	12,515 ▲	12.21% ▲
Puntarenas	Esparza	28,644	23,963	4,681 ▲	19.53% ▲
Puntarenas	Buenos Aires	45,244	40,139	5,105 ▲	12.72% ▲
Puntarenas	Montes de Oro	12,950	11,159	1,791 ▲	16.05% ▲
Puntarenas	Osa	29,433	25,861	3,572 ▲	13.81% ▲
Puntarenas	Quepos	26,861	20,188	6,673 ▲	33.05% ▲
Puntarenas	Golfito	39,150	33,823	5,327 ▲	15.75% ▲
Puntarenas	Coto Brus	38,453	40,082	−1,629 ▼	-4.06% ▼
Puntarenas	Parrita	16,115	12,112	4,003 ▲	33.05% ▲
Puntarenas	Corredores	41,831	37,274	4,557 ▲	12.23% ▲
Puntarenas	Garabito	17,229	10,378	6,851 ▲	66.01% ▲
Limón	Limón	94,415	89,933	4,482 ▲	4.98% ▲
Limón	Pococí	125,962	103,121	22,841 ▲	22.15% ▲
Limón	Siquirres	56,786	52,409	4,377 ▲	8.35% ▲
Limón	Talamanca	30,712	25,857	4,855 ▲	18.78% ▲
Limón	Matina	37,721	33,096	4,625 ▲	13.97% ▲
Limón	Guácimo	41,266	34,879	6,387 ▲	18.31% ▲
