= San José Province =

Province of Costa Rica

San José
- Province
- Flag Seal

- Coordinates: 9.6°N 83.95°W
- Country: Costa Rica
- Capital city: San José (pop. 333,288)

Area
  - Total: 4,966 km^{2} (1,917 sq mi)

Population (2018)
  - Total: 1,635,144
  - Density: 329.3/km^{2} (852.8/sq mi)
- ISO 3166 code: CR-SJ
- HDI (2022): 0.824 very high · 2nd of 7

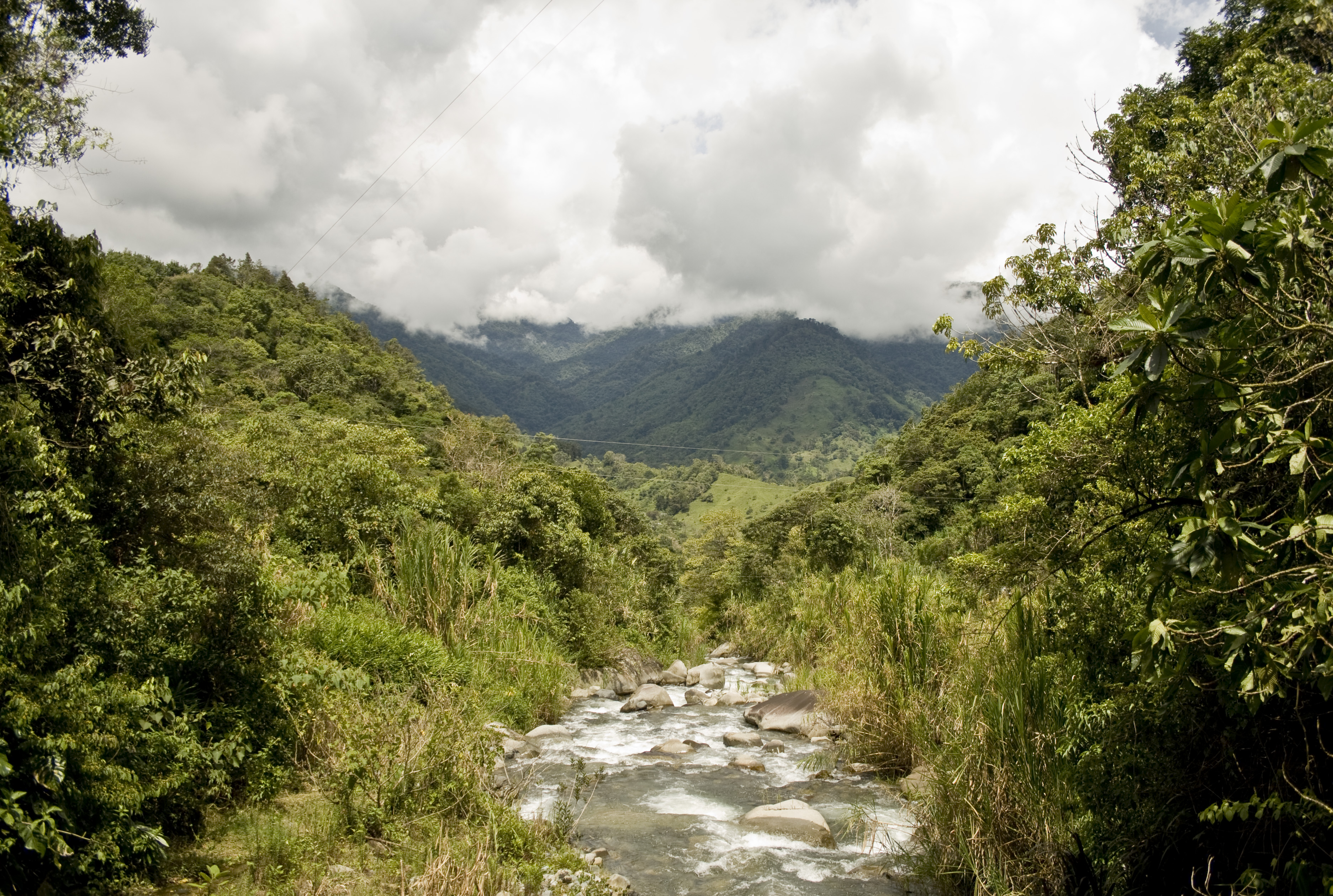
Blanco River, county of Pérez Zeledón. Most rivers in the province of San José are shallow, narrow and often run through mountainous terrain, making them impossible to navigate.

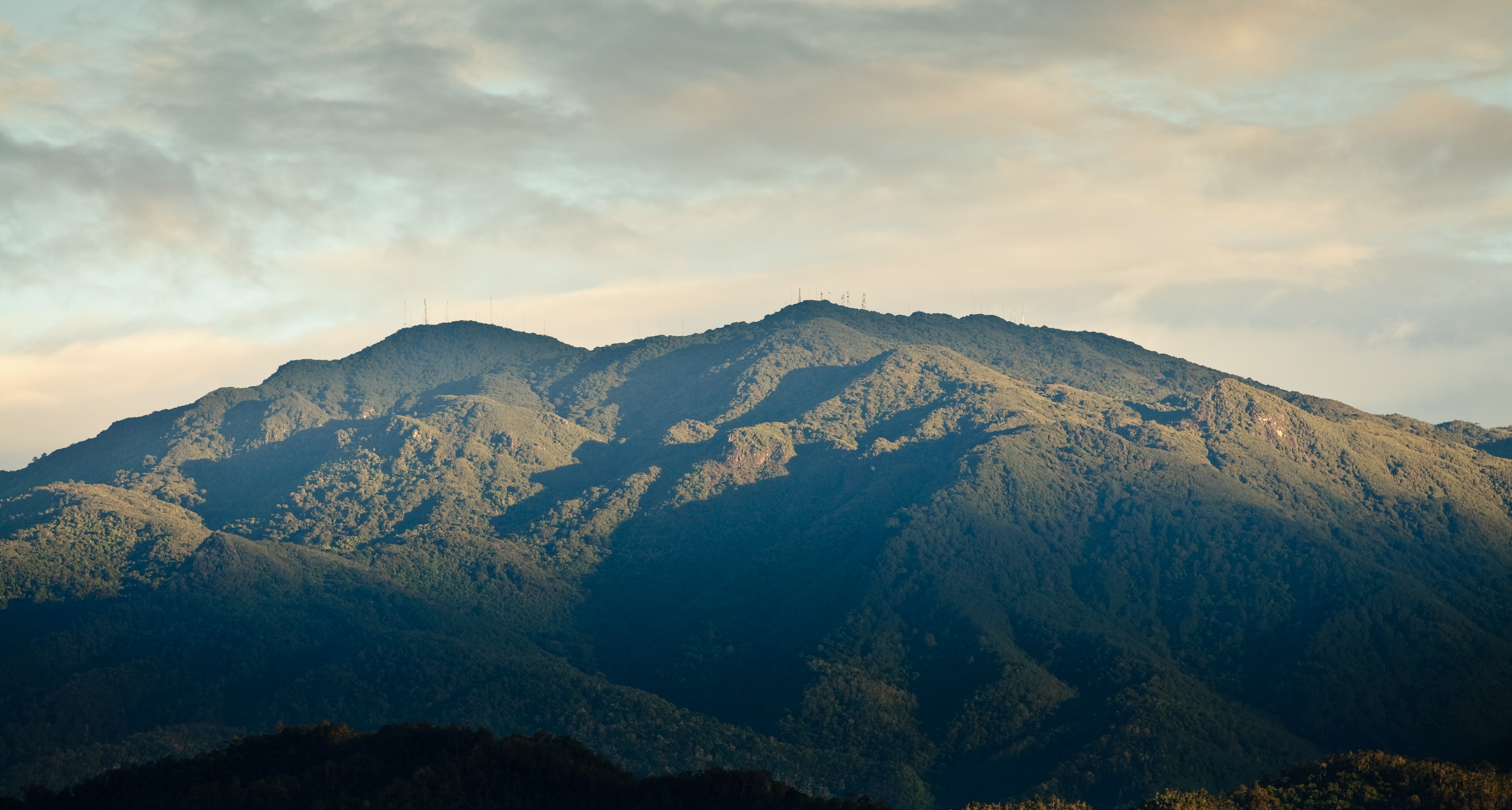
Cerro de la Muerte, southeast of the province

San José (Spanish pronunciation: [saŋ xoˈse]) is a province of Costa Rica. It is located in the central part of the country, and borders (clockwise beginning in the north) the provinces of Alajuela, Heredia, Limón, Cartago, and Puntarenas. The provincial and national capital is San José. The province covers an area of 4,965.9 km^{2} (1,917.3 sq mi) and has a population of 1,404,242.

== Subdivisions ==
The province of San José is subdivided into 20 cantons.

Canton (Capital):

1. San José (San José)
2. Escazú (Escazú)
3. Desamparados (Desamparados)
4. Puriscal (Santiago)
5. Tarrazú (San Marcos)
6. Aserrí (Aserrí)
7. Mora (Colón)
8. Goicoechea (Guadalupe)
9. Santa Ana (Santa Ana)
10. Alajuelita (Alajuelita)
11. Vázquez de Coronado (San Isidro)
12. Acosta (San Ignacio)
13. Tibás (San Juan)
14. Moravia (San Vicente)
15. Montes de Oca (San Pedro)
16. Turrubares (San Pablo)
17. Dota (Santa María)
18. Curridabat (Curridabat)
19. Pérez Zeledón (San Isidro de El General)
20. León Cortés Castro (San Pablo)

== See also ==
- Provinces of Costa Rica
- Greater Metropolitan Area
