= Grande =

Grande means "large" or "great" in many of the Romance languages. It may also refer to:

== Places ==
- Grande, Germany, a municipality in Germany
- Grande Communications, a telecommunications firm based in Texas
- Grande-Rivière (disambiguation)
- Arroio Grande (disambiguation)
- Boca grande (disambiguation)
- Campo Grande (disambiguation)
- El Grande, a German-style board game
- Loma Grande (disambiguation)
- Lucida Grande, a humanist sans-serif typeface
- María Grande, a village and municipality in Entre Ríos Province in northeastern Argentina
- Mojón Grande, a village and municipality in Misiones Province in northeastern Argentina
- Playa Grande (disambiguation)
- Ribeira Grande (disambiguation)
- Rio Grande (disambiguation)
- Salto Grande (disambiguation)
- Valle Grande (disambiguation)
- Várzea Grande (disambiguation)
- Villa Grande (disambiguation)
- Casa Grande Ruins National Monument
- Casas Grandes
- Mesa Grande
- Pueblo Grande de Nevada
- Pueblo Grande Ruin and Irrigation Sites
- Campina Grande, city in Paraíba State, Brazil

== People ==
- Grande (surname), a list of people with the surname

== Other uses ==
- Grande, the main antagonist in the anime series, Tweeny Witches

== See also ==
- Grand (disambiguation)
- Grandis (disambiguation)
- Grandee, high aristocratic title Grande in Spain, Portugal and Brazil
