= Grand River Township =

Grand River Township may refer to the following townships in the United States:

- Grand River Township, Adair County, Iowa
- Grand River Township, Decatur County, Iowa
- Grand River Township, Madison County, Iowa
- Grand River Township, Wayne County, Iowa
- Grand River Township, Sedgwick County, Kansas
- Grand River Township, Bates County, Missouri
- Grand River Township, Cass County, Missouri
- Grand River Township, Daviess County, Missouri
- Grand River Township, DeKalb County, Missouri
- Grand River Township, Bowman County, North Dakota
