= Grand River =

Grand River may refer to:

== Rivers ==
=== Canada ===
- Grand River (Ontario)
  - Grand River Raceway, Elora, Ontario
- Ottawa River, formerly known as Grand River
- Churchill River (Atlantic), formerly known as Grand River

=== United States ===
- Grand River (Colorado), historical name (1836-1921) of the Colorado River above the confluence with the Green River
- Grand River (Michigan)
- Grand River (Ohio)
- Grand River (Oklahoma)
- Grand River (Missouri) in Iowa and Missouri
- Grand River (South Dakota) in North and South Dakota
- Grand River, tributary of Fox River, Wisconsin

== Populated places ==
=== Canada ===
- Grand River, Nova Scotia

=== United States ===
- Grand River, Iowa
- Grand River, Ohio
- Grand River Township, Adair County, Iowa
- Grand River Township, Decatur County, Iowa
- Grand River Township, Madison County, Iowa
- Grand River Township, Wayne County, Iowa
- Grand River Township, Sedgwick County, Kansas
- Grand River Township, Bates County, Missouri
- Grand River Township, Cass County, Missouri
- Grand River Township, Daviess County, Missouri
- Grand River Township, DeKalb County, Missouri
- Grand River Township, Bowman County, North Dakota
- Grand Rivers, Kentucky

=== Mauritius ===
- Grand River, Mauritius

== Other uses ==
- Grand River Airport, in Grand River, Prince Edward Island, Canada
- Grand River Avenue, part of U.S. Route 16 in Michigan, U.S.
- Grand River Collegiate Institute, in Kitchener, Ontario, Canada

== See also ==
- Grand River Valley (disambiguation)
- Grande River (disambiguation)
- Grande-Rivière (disambiguation)
- Rio Grande (Spanish, 'Grand River')
- Great River (disambiguation)
- Big River (disambiguation)
