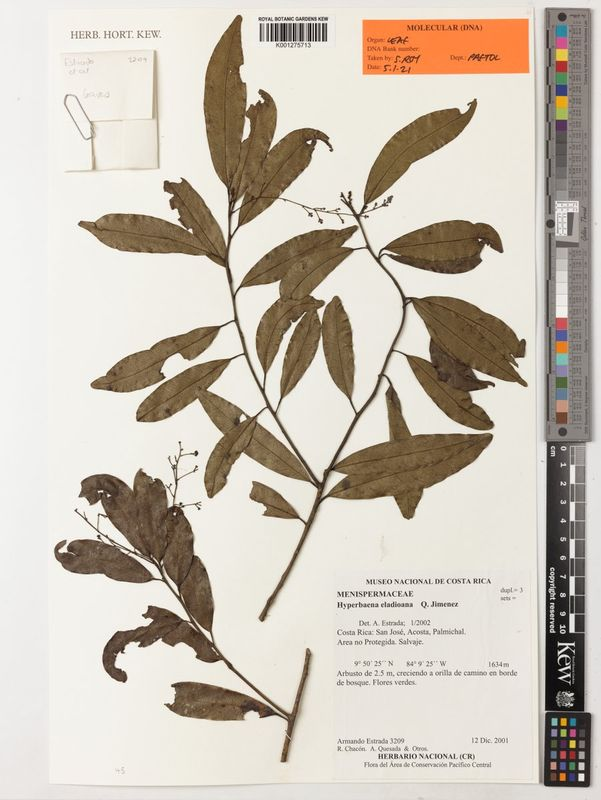

Conservation status
- Near Threatened (IUCN 3.1)

Scientific classification
- Kingdom: Plantae
- Clade: Embryophytes
- Clade: Tracheophytes
- Clade: Spermatophytes
- Clade: Angiosperms
- Clade: Eudicots
- Order: Ranunculales
- Family: Menispermaceae
- Genus: Hyperbaena
- Species: H. eladioana

Binomial name
- Hyperbaena eladioana Q.Jiménez

= Hyperbaena eladioana =

Species of flowering plant

Hyperbaena eladioana is a species of flowering plant in the family Menispermaceae. It is a small tree endemic to Costa Rica. The species was described in 1991, and is listed as Near Threatened by the International Union for Conservation of Nature.

== Taxonomy ==
Hyperbaena eladioana was described by Quírico Jiménez in 1991.

== Distribution ==
Hyperbaena eladioana is native to the wet tropical biome, and grows in humid to wet seasonal premontane and pluvial montane forests.

It is endemic to Costa Rica, and found only on the central-southwestern Pacific Slope. The species is present at elevations of 1,100–1,725 metres (3,609–5,659 ft). Its extent of occurrence is around 5,463 square kilometres (2,109 sq mi).

== Description ==
Hyperbaena eladioana is a shrub or small tree, that grows 3–5 metres (9.8–16.4 ft) high. It flowers in February, November, and December.

== Conservation ==
In 2022, the IUCN assessed Hyperbaena eladioana as Near Threatened. It is threatened by deforestation for agriculture. The species is present in protected areas, including Tenorio Volcano National Park, the Escazú Hills Protected Zone, the Caraigres Protected Zone, and the Turrubares Hills Protected Zone.
