= Cerros de Escazú =

Mountain range in Costa Rica

Escazú Mountains
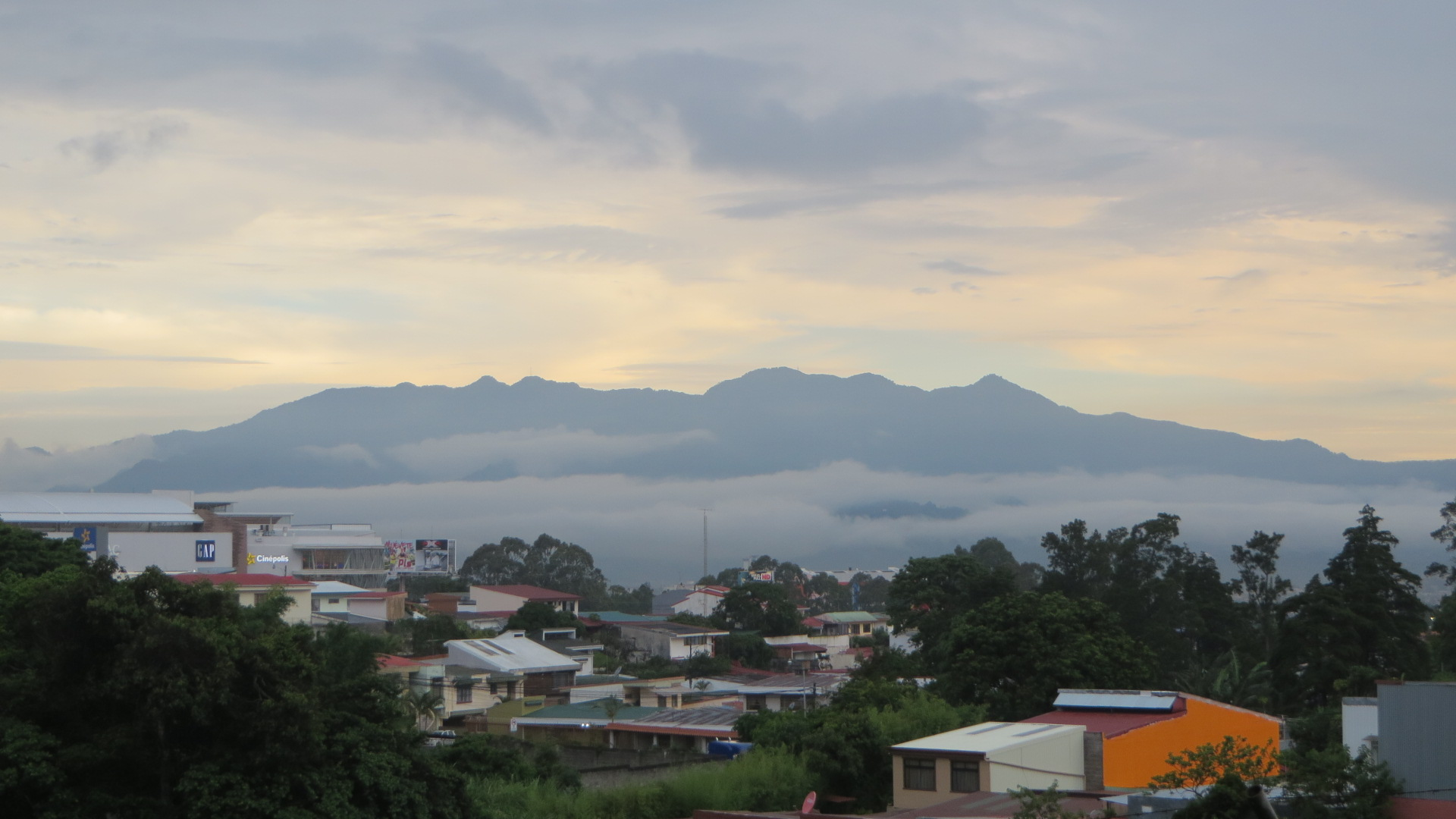
- Cerros de Escazú from the suburbs of San José

Highest point
- Peak: Cerro Rabo de Mico
- Elevation: 2,428 m (7,966 ft)

Naming
- Native name: Cerros de Escazú

Geography
- Country: Costa Rica
- Province: San José
- Range coordinates: 9°51′N 84°09′W
- Parent range: Cordillera de Talamanca

Cerros de Escazú (translation: Escazú Mountains) are a mountain range in San José Province, in central Costa Rica.

== Geography ==
The range borders the Costa Rican Central Valley to the south. It is considered the northernmost portion of the Cordillera de Talamanca.

=== Peaks ===
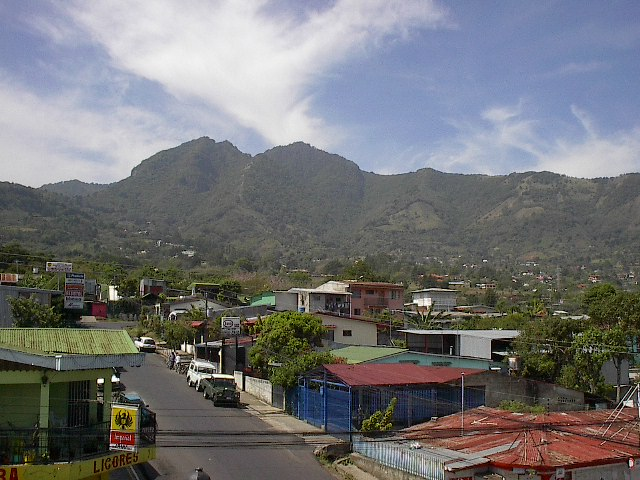
The town of Escazú with the mountains in the background

The highest peak is Cerro Rabo de Mico at 2,428 m (7,966 ft), followed closely by Cerro Cedral at a height of 2,420 m (7,940 ft). The range includes such other peaks as Cerro Pico Alto at 2,353 m (7,720 ft), Cerro Pico Blanco at 2,271 m (7,451 ft) and Cerro San Miguel at 2,035 m (6,677 ft).

=== Settlements ===
While in San José Province, these geographic formations can be seen to the southwest of the capital city, San José. The name is taken from the canton of Escazú, which lies on its northern slopes. Other nearby districts are Santa Ana to the north, Ciudad Colón to the northwest, Tabarcia to the southwest, Palmichal to the southwest, Aserrí to the east and Alajuelita to the northeast. This mountain range lies in various cantons: Escazú, Santa Ana, Mora, Acosta, Aserrí and Alajuelita.

Quitirrisí, located in these hills, is the Native American reserve which lies closest to the capital.

== Conservation ==
Due to its position, this mountain range has several climatic influences that are reflected in the habitat diversity and biodiversity. In an attempt to protect this biological richness but also the local watersheds, the Escazú Hills Protected Zone, the El Rodeo Protected Zone and the Quitirrisí Protected Zone were created.

It is a popular destination for mountain bikers and hikers although there are no clearly marked trails.
