= Rio Grande (disambiguation) =

Rio Grande is a river flowing to the Gulf of Mexico, forming a part of the Mexican-United States border.

Rio Grande may also refer to:

== Rivers ==
=== Argentina ===
- Rio Grande (Jujuy), a river that flows through the Quebrada de Humahuaca
- Río Grande (Mendoza), a tributary of Colorado River
- Río Grande de San Juan, a river in the Cuyo Region also known as Río San Juan del Oro
- Río Grande (Tierra del Fuego), a river that flows to the Argentine Sea

=== Bolivia ===
- Río Grande (Bolivia), a tributary of the Mamoré River

=== Brazil ===
- Rio Grande (Bahia), a tributary of the São Francisco River
- Rio Grande (Dois Rios), a tributary of the Dois Rios River in Rio de Janeiro
- Rio Grande (Paraná River tributary), a tributary of the Paraná River
- Rio Grande (State of Paraná), a tributary of the Ribeira River

=== Philippines ===
- Rio Grande de Cagayan, a river in the Cagayan Province
- Rio Grande de Mindanao, a river in the Mindanao
- Rio Grande de Pampanga, a river in Central Luzon

=== Other rivers ===
- Río Grande (Antioquia), a river in the department of Antioquia, Colombia
- Rio Grande (Jamaica), a major river of Portland Parish, Jamaica
- Rio Grande de Matagalpa, the second longest river in Nicaragua
- Rio Grande (Panama), Coclé Province, Panama
- Río Grande (Puerto Rico), a river in Puerto Rico
- Río Grande (Lugo), a river in the province of Lugo, Spain
- Río Grande, Thujsa Jawira, Ingenio, or Llink'i, a river in the La Paz Department, Bolivia
- Río Grande (Tierra del Fuego), a river in Chile and Argentina that flows to the Atlantic Ocean

== Cities and political divisions ==
=== Argentina ===
- Río Grande, Tierra del Fuego
  - Río Grande Department
- Río Grande, San Luis

=== Brazil ===
- Rio Grande, Minas Gerais
- Rio Grande, Rio de Janeiro
- Rio Grande, Rio Grande do Sul
- Rio Grande do Norte, a state in the Northeast
- Rio Grande do Sul, a state in the South

=== Mexico ===
- Rio Grande, Jalisco
- Río Grande Municipality, Zacatecas

=== Puerto Rico ===
- Río Grande, Puerto Rico, a municipality
- Río Grande, Aguada, Puerto Rico, a barrio
- Río Grande, Jayuya, Puerto Rico, a barrio
- Río Grande, Morovis, Puerto Rico, a barrio
- Río Grande barrio-pueblo, barrio referred to as "Pueblo" of Río Grande municipality in Puerto Rico
- Río Grande, Rincón, Puerto Rico, a barrio

=== United States ===
- Rio Grande, New Jersey
- Rio Grande, Ohio
- Rio Grande County, Colorado
- Rio Grande City, Texas

=== Other places ===
- Río Grande, Dominican Republic
- Río Grande, Veraguas, Panama
- Republic of the Rio Grande, a republic in modern Mexico and Texas that lasted less than a year in 1840.

== Arts and entertainment ==
- Rio Grande (1920 film), an American silent western film
- Rio Grande (1938 film), an American western with Charles Starrett
- Rio Grande (1949 film), an American western starring Sunset Carson
- Rio Grande (1950 film), an American western directed by John Ford
- "Rio Grande" (shanty), a nineteenth-century Anglo-American sea shanty
- Rio Grande, 1957 musical composition by Morton Gould
- The Rio Grande (Lambert), 1927 work for alto, piano, chorus and orchestra by Constant Lambert
- "Rio Grande" (song), a suite composed by Brian Wilson
- Rio Grande, 1994 album by Eddy Mitchell, album of the year at Victoires de la Musique

== Others ==
- Rio Grande Gorge, a geological feature in northern New Mexico
  - Rio Grande Gorge Bridge
- Rio Grande rift, a continental rift zone that separates the Colorado Plateau from the interior of the North American craton, US
- Rio Grande Trail, a proposed long distance trail along the Rio Grande New Mexico, US
- Rio Grande Trail (Colorado), a rail trail in Colorado's Roaring Fork Valley
- Rio Grande Hydroelectric Complex, a pumped-storage power station in Argentina
- Sport Club Rio Grande, a Brazilian football club
- University of Rio Grande, in Rio Grande, Ohio, US
- Federal University of Rio Grande Foundation, in Rio Grande, Rio Grande do Sul, Brazil
- Rio Grande Pickups, a brand of guitar pickups
- Rio Grande Games, a board games publisher
- SS Rio Grande, a Panamanian cargo ship
- Brazilian monitor Rio Grande, a shallow draught armoured river vessel
- Rio Grande Project, a United States Bureau of Reclamation irrigation, hydroelectricity, flood control, and interbasin water transfer project serving the upper Rio Grande basin
- The Denver and Rio Grande Western Railroad, a now defunct Class I railroad in the western United States

== See also ==
- Rio Grande Bridge at Radium Springs, New Mexico
- Rio Grande Detention Center, Laredo, Texas
- Río Grande District (disambiguation)
- Río Grande de Lipez, a river in Potosi Department, Bolivia
- Río Grande de Tarija, a tributary of the Bermejo River in Bolivia
- Río Grande de San Miguel, a river in El Salvador
- Río Grande de Zacapa, a river in eastern Guatemala
- Río Grande de Santiago, a river in Mexico
- Río Grande de Matagalpa, a river in eastern Nicaragua
- Rio Grande de Buba, an estuary in Guinea-Bissau
- Rio Grande da Serra, São Paulo, Brazil, a municipality
- Rio Grande do Norte, a Brazilian state
- Rio Grande do Piauí, Piauí, Brazil, a municipality
- Rio Grande do Sul, a Brazilian state
- Rio Grand, a country music group
- Grande River (disambiguation)
- Grand River (disambiguation)
- Middle Rio Grande (disambiguation)
