= Pristimantis altae =

Conservation status
- Least Concern (IUCN 3.1)

Scientific classification
- Kingdom: Animalia
- Phylum: Chordata
- Class: Amphibia
- Order: Anura
- Family: Strabomantidae
- Genus: Pristimantis
- Species: P. altae

Binomial name
- Pristimantis altae (Dunn, 1942)

Synonyms
- Eleutherodactylus altae Dunn, 1942

Species of amphibian

Pristimantis altae, also known as mountain robber frog, is a species of rain frog in the family Strabomantidae with a bright coral-coloured groin. It is found in Costa Rica and Panama.

== Taxonomy ==
The species and its defining holotype were first collected on the Atlantic slope of Costa Rica below the highest reach of a mountain pass between Barva and Irazú at approximately 4000 feet (2860m), on a mountain slope in El Guarco, Cartago Province.

It was formerly known as Eleutherodactylus altae and was classified in the subgenus Eleutherodactylus by John D. Lynch in 1996. Hedges, Duellman and Heinicke classified it under subgenus Hypodictyon in 2008. Savage (1980) classified it in the Eleutherodactylus cruentus group (which was considered a subset of the E. unistrigatus group). Lynch and Duellman (1997) considered it to be in the E. unistrigatus group of the Eleutherodactylus (Eleutherodactylus) martinicensis series. Savage (2002) placed it in the E. cruentatus group of his newly redefined E. martinicensis series. Hedges, Duellman, and Heinicke (2008) then placed it in the Pristimantis (Hypodictyon) ridens series. Padial, Grant, and Frost (2014) finally recommended not to attempt placing it in a species grouping.

== Description ==
This is a small frog; the males measure to 23.5mm, while the females 27mm. The back is covered in tiny bumps and the colour of it can vary from dark grey to black, sometimes but not always with tiny white speckles. The stomach and lower surface is dark brown. The eye has a copper-coloured iris.

This species is distinguished by its bright coral-coloured groin. This colour extends up the front of the thigh in the form of dots, and also on the rear thigh as dots in a slightly more reddish-orange colour.

This frog is thought likely to not make a mating call. It has a karyotype of 2n = 26.

== Distribution ==
It occurs throughout the northern section of the Cordillera Central of Costa Rica at mid-altitudes, and throughout the eastern Caribbean seaboard of this country, on the slopes of the Cordillera de Talamanca down to almost sea level, from near the Nicaraguan border southward to north-westernmost Panama in La Amistad International Park.

It was initially believed it to be endemic to Costa Rica.

== Ecology ==
The habitats favoured by Pristimantis altae are tropical, humid, lowland and premontane forests and rainforests. It has been found at elevations of 60 to 1245m. According to Savage (2002), himself citing earlier studies, this species hides during the day in bromeliads as well as amongst leaf litter on the forest floor, and is found moving actively on low vegetation during the night.

Although it is not confirmed in this species, it is thought to be a frog which lays its eggs directly on moist substrate on land, possibly on vegetation. It is thought to be a "direct developer", with the species skipping a tadpole stage, the eggs hatching directly into juvenile frogs.

The only thing known about its diet is from Toft in 1981, who reported on dissecting a single individual to examine the stomach contents. These were said to be a few small arthropods.

== Conservation ==
Pristimantis altae is considered threatened in Costa Rica. The IUCN rated its population status to be "least concern".

It is rarely seen, but often present. According to the IUCN in 2004 it was threatened by habitat loss, but in 2008 it stated that while the frog does not appear to adapt well to modified habitats, it is not believed to be threatened, as it continues to be present where it has historically been reported, is relatively abundant within its known range, and the majority of its known distribution is protected within well-managed reserves.

It occurs in the Maquenque National Wildlife Refuge in Costa Rica at altitudes of 100 to 1200m. In Costa Rica it is regularly encountered by herpetologists at the Alberto Manuel Brenes Biological Reserve and the Monteverde Cloud Forest Reserve, and occurs in Braulio Carrillo National Park. It occurs in La Amistad International Park in both Costa Rica and Panama.
