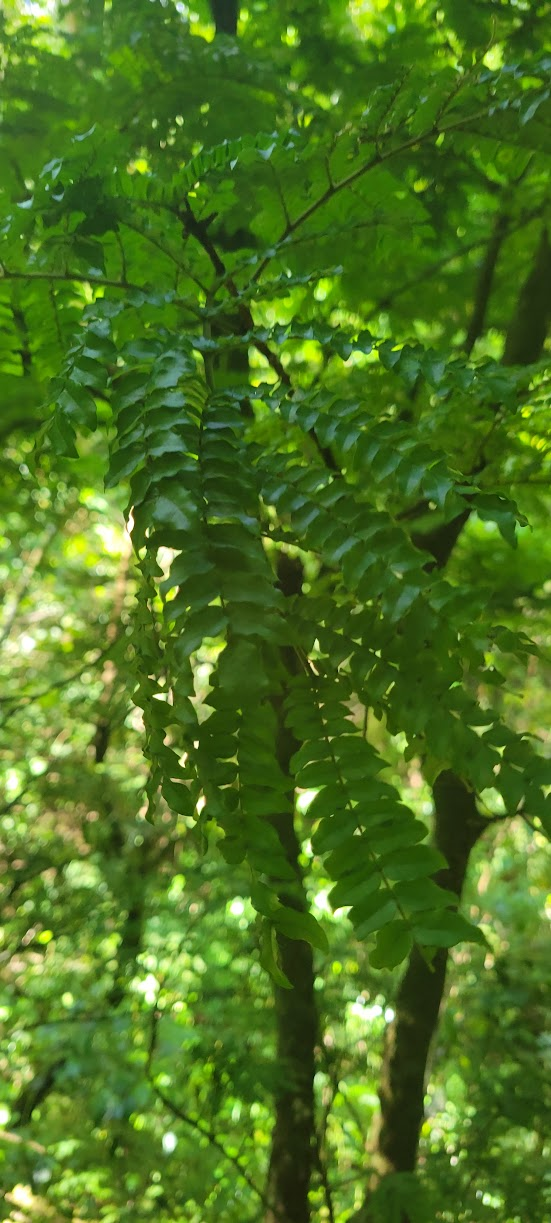

Conservation status
- Near Threatened (IUCN 3.1)

Scientific classification
- Kingdom: Plantae
- Clade: Embryophytes
- Clade: Tracheophytes
- Clade: Angiosperms
- Clade: Eudicots
- Clade: Rosids
- Order: Fabales
- Family: Fabaceae
- Subfamily: Caesalpinioideae
- Clade: Mimosoid clade
- Genus: Cojoba
- Species: C. costaricensis

Binomial name
- Cojoba costaricensis Britton & Rose

Synonyms
- Pithecellobium costaricense (Britton & Rose) Standl.

= Cojoba costaricensis =

Species of flowering plant

Cojoba costaricensis, commonly known as angel's hair, lorito, or cabello de angel, is a species of plant in the family Fabaceae that is endemic to Costa Rica and Panama.

== Distribution and habitat ==
Cojoba costaricensis is native to montane areas of Costa Rica and Panama, where it grows in humid cloud and oak forests at elevations of 1,150–2,000 m (3,770–6,560 ft) above sea level.

== Description ==
Cojoba costaricensis is a rounded tree growing to 15 m (49 ft) tall. The twigs, petioles, rachises, and peduncles are densely covered in fine brown hairs. The leaves are bipinnate with 4-8 pairs of pinnae, each pinna bearing 7-14 pairs of leaflets. Small nectar glands can be found between the pinnae. The leaflets are oblong-lanceolate with a rounded base and somewhat pointed tip, each measuring 1.5–2.5 cm (0.59–0.98 in) long. The white, brushlike flowers are borne on a 3–6 cm (1.2–2.4 in) peduncle. The fruits are long, red pods growing up to 15 cm (5.9 in) long, twisting as they mature to reveal shiny black seeds.

== Ecology ==
Cojoba costaricensis flowers from January to November, with the flowers pollinated by moths.

== Conservation status ==
Cojoba costaricensis is listed as near threatened on the International Union for the Conservation of Nature's Red List under criteria B1b(iii). It is reported to be very common in Costa Rica and occurs in many protected areas (including Alberto Manuel Brenes Biological Reserve, La Amistad International Park, Braulio Carrillo National Park, Grecia Forest Reserve, and Guanacaste National Park), however, almost all habitat suitable for this species located outside of protected areas has been deforested or heavily disturbed. The wood of C. costaricensis is also harvested for timber.
