= Grande-Rivière =

Grande-Rivière (Great River) or variation, may refer to:

== Canada ==
=== New Brunswick ===
- Big Tracadie River (French: Grande rivière Tracadie), a river in northeastern New Brunswick
- Grande Rivière, a river in northwestern New Brunswick formerly known as the Grand River

=== Nova Scotia ===
- Grande-Rivière (Cap-Breton), an Acadian community in Cape Breton Regional Municipality

=== Nunavik ===
- Grande Rivière de la Baleine (Great Whale River)

=== Quebec ===
- La Grande River, a river in Baie-James, Nord-du-Quebec
- Grande-Rivière, Quebec, a city in Le Rocher-Percé Regional County Municipality, Gaspésie–Îles-de-la-Madeleine
  - Grande-Rivière railway station, in the above municipality
- Grande-Rivière, a tributary of Baie-des-Chaleurs in Le Rocher-Percé Regional County Municipality, Gaspésie–Îles-de-la-Madeleine
- Zec de la Grande-Rivière, a controlled harvested area in Le Rocher-Percé Regional County Municipality, Gaspésie–Îles-de-la-Madeleine
- La Grande-Rivière, a river in Havre-Saint-Pierre, Minganie Regional County Municipality, Côte-Nord
- Grande Rivière (Ouelle River tributary), a river in Saint-Gabriel-Lalemant, Kamouraska Regional County Municipality, Bas-Saint-Laurent
- La Grande-Rivière, a river in Saint-Pierre-de-l'Île-d'Orléans, Capitale-Nationale
- La Grande Rivière Airport, in Radisson

== Caribbean ==
- Grande Rivière de l'Anse la Raye, in Anse la Ray District, Saint Lucia
- Grande Rivière, Dennery, in Dennery District, Saint Lucia
- Grande-Rivière, Gros-Islet, in Gros Islet District, Saint Lucia
- Grande-Rivière-du-Nord, commune of north department in Haiti, birthplace of the Jean Jacques Dessalines, one of the forefathers of the Haitian Republic
- Grande-Rivière-du-Nord Arrondissement, in Haiti
- Grande Rivière de Nippes, commune of Nippes department in Haiti
- Grande Rivière de Jacmel, in Haiti
- Grand'Rivière, a village in Martinique
- Grande Rivière (Martinique), a river with mouth near the village
- Grande Riviere, in Trinidad

== France ==
- Grande-Rivière, Jura, a commune in the region of Franche-Comté
- Grande-Rivière Château, a commune in the Jura department in Bourgogne-Franche-Comté in eastern France

== United States ==
- Grande Rivière Noire (Big Black River), in Maine
- Grand Riviera Theater, in Detroit, Michigan

== See also ==
- Grand River (disambiguation)
