= Great River =

Great River may refer to:

== Rivers ==
- Great River (Grenada)
- Great River (Jamaica)
- Mississippi River, from the Ojibwe name Misi-ziibi, meaning "Great River"
- Nahr al-Kabir al-Janoubi, Arabic for "Great River"
- Connetquot River, New York, an Algonquian (Native American) word meaning "Great River"
- Bolshaya (river), in Russia

== Places ==
- Great River, New York
  - Great River station

== Film and literature ==
- Great River: The Rio Grande in North American History, a non-fiction book by Paul Horgan
- Great River (film), a 2010 Canadian film
- Anduin, a river in J. R. R. Tolkien's fictional Middle-earth, is also known as the Great River of Wilderland
- Great River of Narnia, in C. S. Lewis's fictional world

== Other ==
- Great River Regional Library, a multi-county public library system in the U.S. State of Minnesota

== See also ==
- Grand River (disambiguation)
- Big River (disambiguation)
