= Grande River =

Grande River is the name of the following rivers:

- Grande River (Rio de Janeiro), Rio de Janeiro state, Brazil
- La Grande River, Quebec, Canada
- Grande River (Coquimbo), Chile
- Grande River (Panama)
- Grande River (Sabana Grande, Puerto Rico)
- Grande River (Uruguay)

== See also ==
- Grande River Protected Zone, Costa Rica
- Grande Rivière (Ouelle River tributary), Quebec, Canada
- Grand River (disambiguation)
- Rio Grande (disambiguation)
