= Kula tribe (Rivers State) =

Town and sub-group of the ijaw people, Nigeria

The Kula tribe of the Ijaw people lives in Akuku Toru Local Government Area, southwestern Rivers State, Nigeria. The Kula people were not originally speaking Kalabari as their language but has lost their real language due to war alliance, trade and close interactions with the Kalabaris. The small Kalabari-speaking tribe is sometimes classified as a Kalabari community rather than as its own tribe. The tribal seat is the town of Kula inmernated from Opu-Kula as it aborigine founded and established by its founding fathers.

== Location and geographical setting ==
Kula is situated in the south western axis of Rivers State of Nigeria - under the Akuku-Toru Local Government Area of Rivers State. Its geographical coordinates are latitude 4.34139 and longitude 6.64611. It is a low-lying coastal area in the mangrove swamp region of the Niger Delta, with a few feet above the mean sea level, located very close to the Atlantic Ocean. The area is drained by a network of rivers such as San Batholomew (Aguda Toru), Santa Babara (Owanga Toru) etc. with their tributaries, creeks and tidal inlets.

Apart from the Kula main town, the Kula territory comprises many settlements in different locations that occupy a geographical space about two-thirds of the Akuku-Toru Local Government Area. Her expansive territories span to Opukiri in the North and extends to Owuanga-toru and Anwo-bio. Her physical environment is blessed with vast occurrence of natural resources including oil and gas accumulations. Kula is thus host to Shell and Chevron oil companies.

== Migration and historical background ==
The origin of the people now known as Kula in the Eastern Niger Delta area dates back to many centuries ago with a long chequered history. The exact time of the movement from their remote ancestral homelands into the Eastern Niger Delta base to establish the Kula Kingdom is, however, not easy to come by for some prevalent reasons, being a pre-literate period. History has it that Kula is an amalgam of fourteen (14) ancient independent communities scattered around the present Kula territory. These include: Opu-Kula, Boro, Nangwo-ama, Kongo-ama, Kilama/Diaba/Offo, Isoma, Ingeje, Owuangaye, Ibiame (Agudame), Tubo, Ariame, Obiame etc. Today, these and other over 100 fishing villages/settlements (scattered within the 14 major communities) combine with the present Kula Town (Anyame-Kula) to make up the Kula Kingdom.

The migration of the Kula people has a long history. Most accounts on Kula history hardly go beyond the old Kula federation of fourteen communities, probably because of the complex history. There were movements before they arrived in the present territory in the eastern Niger Delta. For convenience, the migration traditions of the Kula people can be briefly viewed in two broad angles as narrated below.

One group comprising a set of ijaw (ijo) settlers were traced to the Iselema area in the western Niger Delta in the present day Delta State of Nigeria. Some writers even refer to an earlier movement from the central delta into the western delta. They moved from Iselema (western delta) through the Ita-Kula axis to the present territory. However, details of the series of movements were not clearly captured even as the cause of such movements was not clearly known; it might be connected with external attacks, intra-group conflicts, pestilence, or floods. Given the long distance between the western delta and the present domain, we also expect different temporal settlements along the line if this account is to be accepted. When they arrived in this part of the eastern delta, they settled in their individual families at different locations (which constituted part of the 14 major communities), occasionally meeting at Opu-Kula, which served as the capital, for issues of mutual interests or for other social purposes. It is claimed that it is because of this origin that Kula is sometimes called Suku Iselema (Southern Iselema or Iselema South, of sorts)

The other group comprising Sara and his people were traced to Engenni (of Delta-Edoid origin) in present-day Ahoada West Local Government Area of Rivers State. For some social reasons, Sara and his people fled their original homeland in Engenni and temporally stopped at some settlements before they moved into the Bille Kingdom. They settled at Bille town but after sometime there arose a conflict between Sara and the Bille people with a plot to eliminate him which was disclosed to him by his concubine, a Bille woman. Thus Sara and his people hurriedly but secretly left Bille in the night. He first settled at Ekema within Bille territory, some distance from central Bille town. Not comfortable for fear of being easily attacked, he moved out and after crossing the Sombreiro river (Ololo Toru) he passed through Boro to Opu-Kula. The leader then (Igbaniye-Oko) and some of the people there were willing to accommodate him, but Sara was not comfortable to settle down for some obvious reasons including his interest in hunting and perceived hostility by some of his hosts.

== The present Kula settlement ==
From Opu-Kula, Sara moved southward and, after crossing the San Batholomew River (Aguda Toru), founded the present Kula Town which today is the focal point of the ancient Kula Kingdom. Unknown to Sara, his brother Opu Ogoro who also left Engenni in search of him (Sara) had already settled at Isoma closed to the present Kula. They were eventually united through their respective family members who met and recognized themselves during hunting exercise.

Meanwhile, seeing that the present Kula is more spacious, strategic and comfortable, Sara sent for the other group(s) - consisting of about 13 communities - to join him which they obliged thereby forming a clustered settlement pattern instead of the previous dispersed settlement pattern as he generously apportioned lands to all the arriving leaders in the new settlement which is also referred to as Anyaminama or Anyame Kula. Thus King Sara brought all the outlying communities/settlements under one central and united government under his able leadership. This confederation brought unity in diversity among the founding fathers and built a formidable Kula Kingdom that reduced the internal friction, security and other social challenges posed in the old Kula set-up. According to oral tradition, in appreciation of his adventures, ingenuity, pragmatic leadership and magnanimity as well as the strategic position of the new settlement, they accorded him the title Ada Sara meaning "Father Sara" or "father of all" in preference for the "Opu" title as he was seen as a rallying point and a unifying force. Among some of the leaders who left Opu-Kula and other earlier settlements to accompany King Ada-Sara (Adaye-Sara) were Opu Singi, Opu Sinya, Opu Ibiamina-Ekeke, Opu Ari, Opu Ebe, Opu Ende, Opu Boye, Opu Ogoro, Opu Afuro, Opu Eze, Opu Igbaniye-Oko who arrived last, and other prominent personalities.

Oral traditions and recorded history portray the Kula people to be very old and well established for a long time in their present domain. Nembe traditions recall hostilities between Kula and Onyoma (one of the early seven settlements of Nembe) at a period in her early history before the reign of Kala-Ekule who regrouped together the remnants of the seven ancestor settlements (which were thitherto ravaged by either internal wars, plagues or external attacks) to form the nucleus of the present city-state or kingdom of Nembe. The period of this ruler (King Kala-Ekule of Nembe) has been estimated to about 1400. Judging from this tradition of the neighbouring Nembe Kingdom gives a relative age of Kula much earlier than 1400 CE. In a similar vein, early European records reported two Portuguese ships namely Rio avenso et avairo and Rio dis coneo meeting the Kula people in their present site in 1472 before moving to the New Calabar river due to some unfavourable environmental conditions (According to accounts by Dr P.Armoury-Talbot, a colonial administrator at Degema).

More over, the report of the Justice G. G. Robinson's Commission of Inquiry into the Okrika-Kalabari dispute, in the then Degema Division, in 1950 maintained the fact that Kula (like Bille and Ke) was established before the arrival of the Kalabaris at the Old Shipping (Elem-Kalabari) despite being associated with the latter through administrative convenience, inter-marriage, neighbourliness etc.

== Administrative structure ==
Generally, the local political structure is organized around a monarchical system of government headed by the King (Amanyanabo) with a Council of Chiefs (Alapu or Ala-siri) that assists in the administration of the kingdom. The chiefs emerge from the prominent founding war canoe houses and other stools created within them. The Intelligence Report on the Kalabari Clan in the then Degema District in 1935 by the District Officer, Captain V. C. M. Kelsey, identified some of the chieftaincy stools existing in Kula at that time, though without an attempt at classification. The number of chieftaincy stools in Kula has since increased significantly.

Since the time of His Greatness, King Sara 1 (Ada-Sara Or Adaye-Sara), the originator of the dynasty that bears his name, many kings have ruled and reigned who defended the expansive territories which spanned to Opukiri in the North and extended to Owuanga-toru and Anwo-bio thereby maintaining the growth and development of Kula to her present status. The incumbent Amanyanabo (King) is King (Sir) Dr Kroma Amabibi Eleki from the famous Adaye-Sara dynasty of Kula. King Kroma Eleki was installed on January 31, 1982, but his reign could not materialize because of complex litigations and insurmountable hurdles he passed through until January 7, 2010, when the River State Government brokered peace.

The Kula monarchy has been flourishing as a powerful territorial entity for many centuries to its present surviving realities; within a sphere of influence of about two-thirds of the area occupied by the present Akuku Toru Local Government Area of River State. In line with modern political and administrative expectations, other functional bodies like Community Development Committee (CDC), Youths-oriented Organisations, Compound Leaders etc. have become important organs that work in tandem with the king and the Chiefs Council for the administration and development of the Kula Community.

In recent times, leadership has become a major challenge in Kula even as it has been enmeshed in various leadership crises that seem to be intractable. As far back as the early 1980s the position of the Amanyanabo of Kula was in dispute followed with series of intricate litigations up to the Supreme Court of Nigeria. It was between the "warring brothers" (Chief Iwarisoibiba Aaron Sukubo-Igbe and Chief Kroma Amabibi Eleki) of the Sara Royal House on one hand and between the latter and the Oko Chieftaincy House on the other hand. This led to a cobweb of legal battle and corresponding disaffection in the area.

The ugly state of affairs was worsened by the emergence of youth restiveness and militancy in the area in recent years. It was not until early 2010 that the Rt. Hon. Chibuike Rotimi Amaechi-led Rivers State government waded into the situation. After a scrutiny and critical analysis of the circumstances surrounding the kingship imbroglio as well as available documents/legal records relevant to the case in point, it endorsed the incumbent (King Kroma Eleki) as the rightful Amanyanbo of Kula Kingdom and accorded a third class status to the Kula kingship stool which was thitherto not recognised in the existing Chieftaincy Classification Scheme in the State.

As of December 2004, during the oil flowstations shut-down operations by the Community, Chief Daminabo Dan - Opusingi was the chairman, Council of Chiefs (They held brief for the king) of Kula.
Chief Dan Opusingi took the chairmanship from Chief Anthony Opuari who also died in the attack alongside Chief Obaye Ojuka, Chief Telema Eferebo. With the developments of 2010, the leadership structure has the Amanyanabo-in-Council, King (Sir) Dr Kroma Amabibi Eleki-Sara XIV at the helm of affairs.

== Significant events ==
- 11 August 2017: Belema, Ngeje and Offoinama Communities in Kula Kingdom shut down Belema flowstation operated by the Shell Petroleum Development Company of Nigeria
- Thursday, 7 January 2010: The Rivers State Government, under the administration of Rt. Hon. Chibuike Rotimi Amaechi as Governor, approved a second-class chief as the Amanyanabo of Kula in the person of King (Sir) Dr Kroma Amabibi Eleki (from the Sara Royal House) after a prolonged, 28-year legal tussle over the kingship (Amanyanabo) stool.
- 22 January 2007: Fire disaster at Kula Town burning down several houses.
- 15 January 2007: Armed men attacked Kula Town and killed several people. Resisted by opposing armed group.
- 12 January 2007: Armed men attack and killed 4 Kula chiefs traveling by boat from Abonnema to Kula. Those killed were members of Kula Council of Chiefs, of a faction involved in an ongoing power struggle within the Kula tribe. In response to the unrest, 2 Amphibious Brigade in Port Harcourt deployed soldiers to the area.
- December 2004: Kula men and women shut down two Shell-operated flow stations (Ekulama 1, Ekulama 2) and Chevron-Texaco-operated Robertkiri flow station.
- 7 January 1983: Kula suffered a great fire outbreak that caused destruction of houses and properties in Kula Town. This warranted the late sage and Nigerian statesman, Chief Obafemi Awolowo, to visit the Community.
- 1982: The dispute over the Amanyanabo (Kingship) stool started.
- 1930: The first school was established in Kula called Sara Memorial School.
- 1929: There was a smallpox outbreak in Kula that claimed many lives
- 1913: The killing of twin babies stopped in Kula through the efforts by one Odoni Mark.
- January 1910: The first church was established in Kula under the auspices of late Mr. Bragbeye Fenny; one of the four (out of eleven accused) released from the 'Calabar case' in 1909
- 1909: Seven out of eleven Kula people were convicted and killed in Calabar because they were accused of killing a Nembe person as a sacrifice to the deity Fenibeso.
