= Cerro Rabo de Mico =

Mountain in Costa Rica

Highest point
- Elevation: 2,428 m (7,966 ft)
- Coordinates: 9°51′N 84°08′W

Geography
- Location: Costa Rica
- Parent range: Cerros de Escazú

Climbing
- Easiest route: Hike

The Cerro Rabo de Mico ("Monkey's Tail Hill") is the highest mountain of the Cerros de Escazú, Costa Rica at 2,428 m (7,966 ft). The peak is accessible by trails from Escazu as well as Aserri, through the trail that leads past la Piedra de Aserri. Rabo de mico means literally 'monkey tail' although this denomination probably comes from a tree fern colloquially named likewise.

== See also ==
- Cerro Cedral
- Cerro Pico Alto
- Cerro Pico Blanco
- Cerro San Miguel
