= Rosario Creek Protected Zone =

Protected area in Costa Rica

- Zona Protectora Quebrada Rosario
- IUCN category VI (protected area with sustainable use of natural resources)
- Location within Costa Rica
- Location: Costa Rica
- Coordinates: 9.711°N 84.083°W
- Area: 0.27 square kilometres (0.10 sq mi)
- Established: 19 September 1997
- Governing body: National System of Conservation Areas (SINAC)

Rosario Creek Protected Zone (Spanish: Zona Protectora Quebrada Rosario), is a protected area in Costa Rica, managed under the Central Conservation Area, it was created in 1997 by decree 26297-MINAE.
