= Grand River Valley =

Grand River Valley is a valley surrounding rivers of that name in North America.

One is in Canada:

- Grand River (Ontario)

The remaining are in the United States:

- Grand River (Michigan)
- Grand River (Ohio)
  - Grand River Valley AVA, Ohio wine region
- Grand River (Wisconsin)
- Grand River (Missouri), in Iowa and Missouri
- Grand River (South Dakota), in North Dakota and South Dakota
