= Tiribí River Protected Zone =

Protected area in Costa Rica

- Zona Protectora Río Tiribí
- IUCN category VI (protected area with sustainable use of natural resources)
- Location within Costa Rica
- Location: Costa Rica
- Coordinates: 9.948°N 83.957°W
- Area: 7.02 square kilometres (2.71 sq mi)
- Established: 17 July 1976
- Governing body: National System of Conservation Areas (SINAC)

Tiribí River Protected Zone (Spanish: Zona Protectora Río Tiribí), is a protected area in Costa Rica, managed under the Central Conservation Area, it was created in 1976 by executive decree 6112-A.
