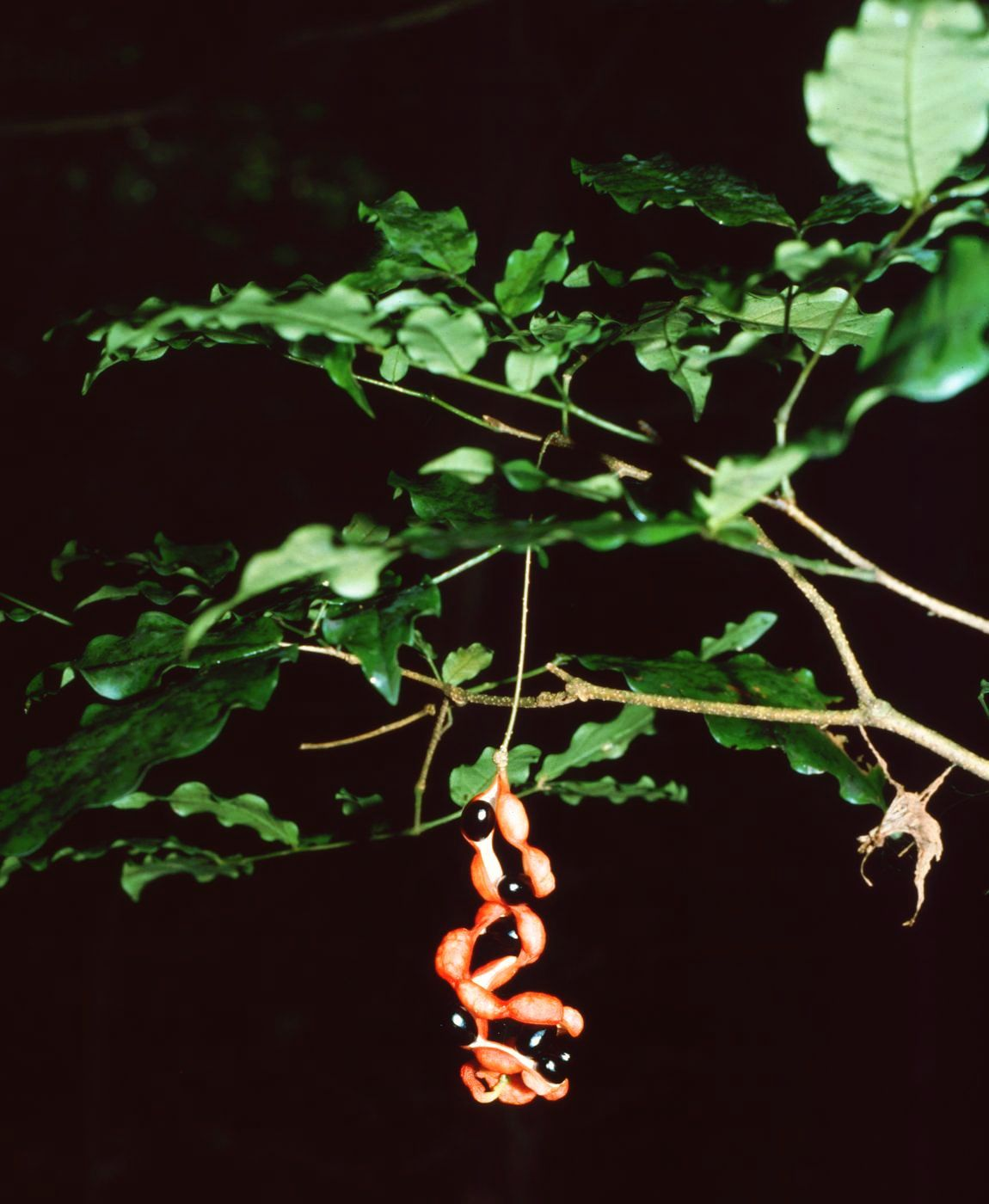
- Cojoba valerioi

Scientific classification
- Kingdom: Plantae
- Clade: Tracheophytes
- Clade: Angiosperms
- Clade: Eudicots
- Clade: Rosids
- Order: Fabales
- Family: Fabaceae
- Subfamily: Caesalpinioideae
- Clade: Mimosoid clade
- Genus: Cojoba; Britton and Rose (1928)

Species
- 15; see text

Synonyms
- Obolinga Barneby (1989)

= Cojoba =

Genus of legumes

Cojoba is a genus of flowering plants in the family Fabaceae. It includes 15 species, which range through the tropical Americas from northern Mexico through Central America and the Caribbean to Bolivia and northern Brazil.

== Taxonomy ==
The genus was described by Britton and Rose published in North American Flora 23(1): 29. 1928. The type species is Cojoba arborea (L.) Britton & Rose

== Species ==
15 species are accepted:

- Cojoba arborea (L.) Britton & Rose
- Cojoba bahorucensis J.W.Grimes & R.García
- Cojoba beckii Barneby & J.W.Grimes
- Cojoba catenata (Donn.Sm.) Britton & Rose
- Cojoba chazutensis (Standl.) L.Rico
- Cojoba costaricensis Britton & Rose
- Cojoba escuintlensis (Lundell) L.Rico
- Cojoba filipes (Vent.) Barneby & J.W.Grimes
- Cojoba graciliflora (S.F.Blake) Britton & Rose
- Cojoba longipendula (Forero & A.H.Gentry) Forero & C.Romero
- Cojoba rufescens (Benth.) Britton & Rose
- Cojoba sophorocarpa (Benth.) Britton & Rose
- Cojoba urbanii (Alain) R.G.García & Peguero
- Cojoba zanonii (Barneby) Barneby & J.W.Grimes
