= Château-des-Prés =

Former commune in Bourgogne-Franche-Comté, France

- Part of Grande-Rivière Château
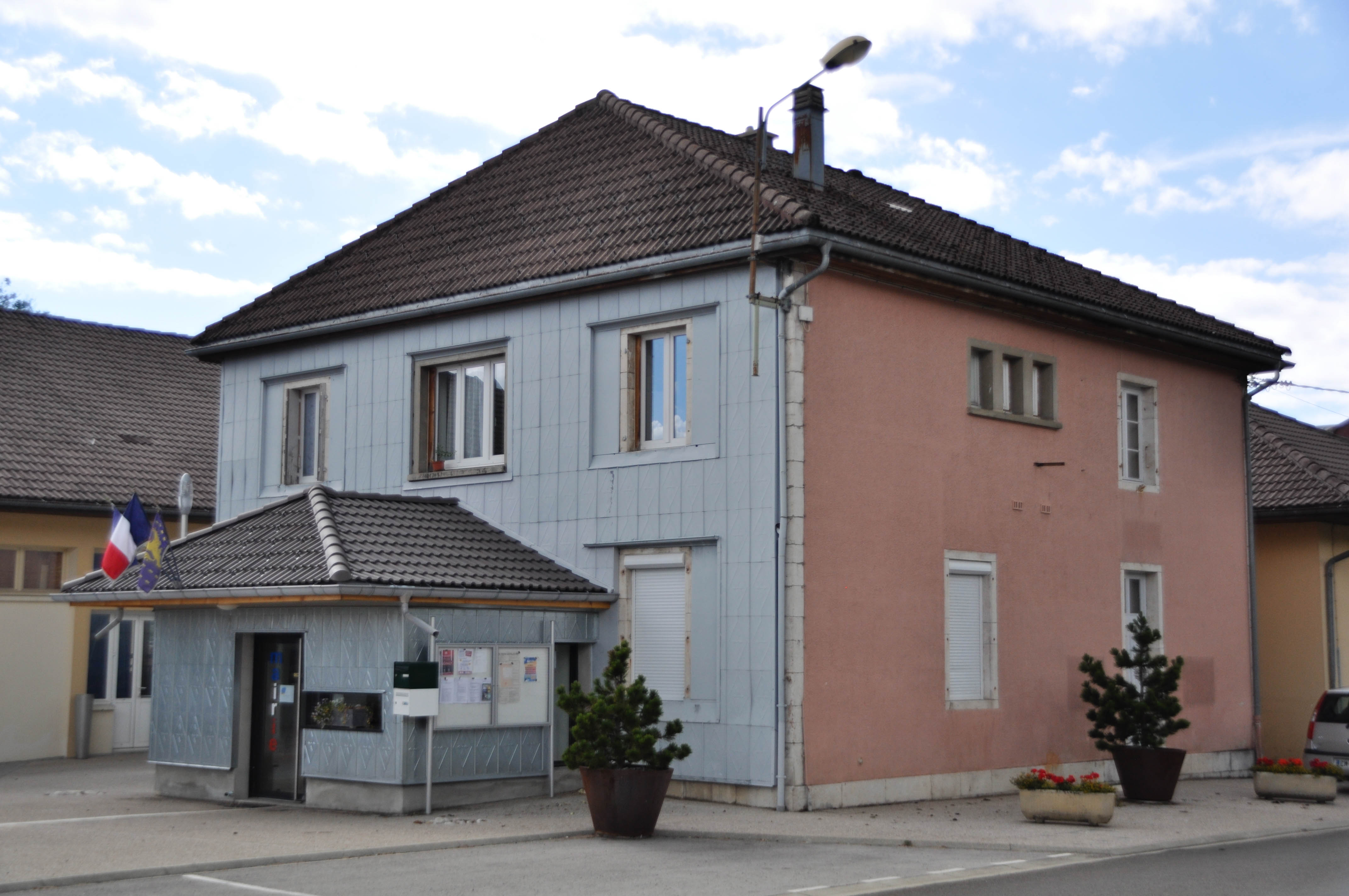
- Town hall
- Location of Château-des-Prés
- Location within France Location within Bourgogne-Franche-Comté
- Coordinates: 46°30′06″N 5°53′55″E
- Country: France
- Region: Bourgogne-Franche-Comté
- Department: Jura
- Arrondissement: Saint-Claude
- Canton: Saint-Laurent-en-Grandvaux
- Commune: Grande-Rivière Château
- Area^{1}: 8.62 km^{2} (3.33 sq mi)
- Highest elevation: 1,070 m (3,510 ft)
- Lowest elevation: 890 m (2,920 ft)
- Population (2023): 202
  - Density: 23.4/km^{2} (60.7/sq mi)
- Time zone: UTC+01:00 (CET)
  - Summer (DST): UTC+02:00 (CEST)
- Postal code: 39150
- ^{1} French Land Register data, which excludes lakes, ponds, glaciers > 1 km^{2} (0.386 sq mi or 247 acres) and river estuaries.

Château-des-Prés (French pronunciation: [ʃɑto de pʁe]) is a former commune in the Jura department in Bourgogne-Franche-Comté in eastern France. On 1 January 2019, it was merged into the new commune Grande-Rivière Château.

== See also ==
- Communes of the Jura department
