= Tuís River Basin Protected Zone =

Protected area in Costa Rica

- Zona Protectora Cuenca del Río Tuís
- IUCN category VI (protected area with sustainable use of natural resources)
- Location within Costa Rica
- Location: Costa Rica
- Coordinates: 9.775°N 83.603°W
- Area: 40.87 square kilometres (15.78 sq mi)
- Established: 20 February 1986
- Governing body: National System of Conservation Areas (SINAC)

Tuís River Basin Protected Zone (Spanish: Zona Protectora Cuenca del Río Tuís), is a protected area in Costa Rica, managed under the Central Conservation Area, it was created in 1986 by decree 16853-MAG.
