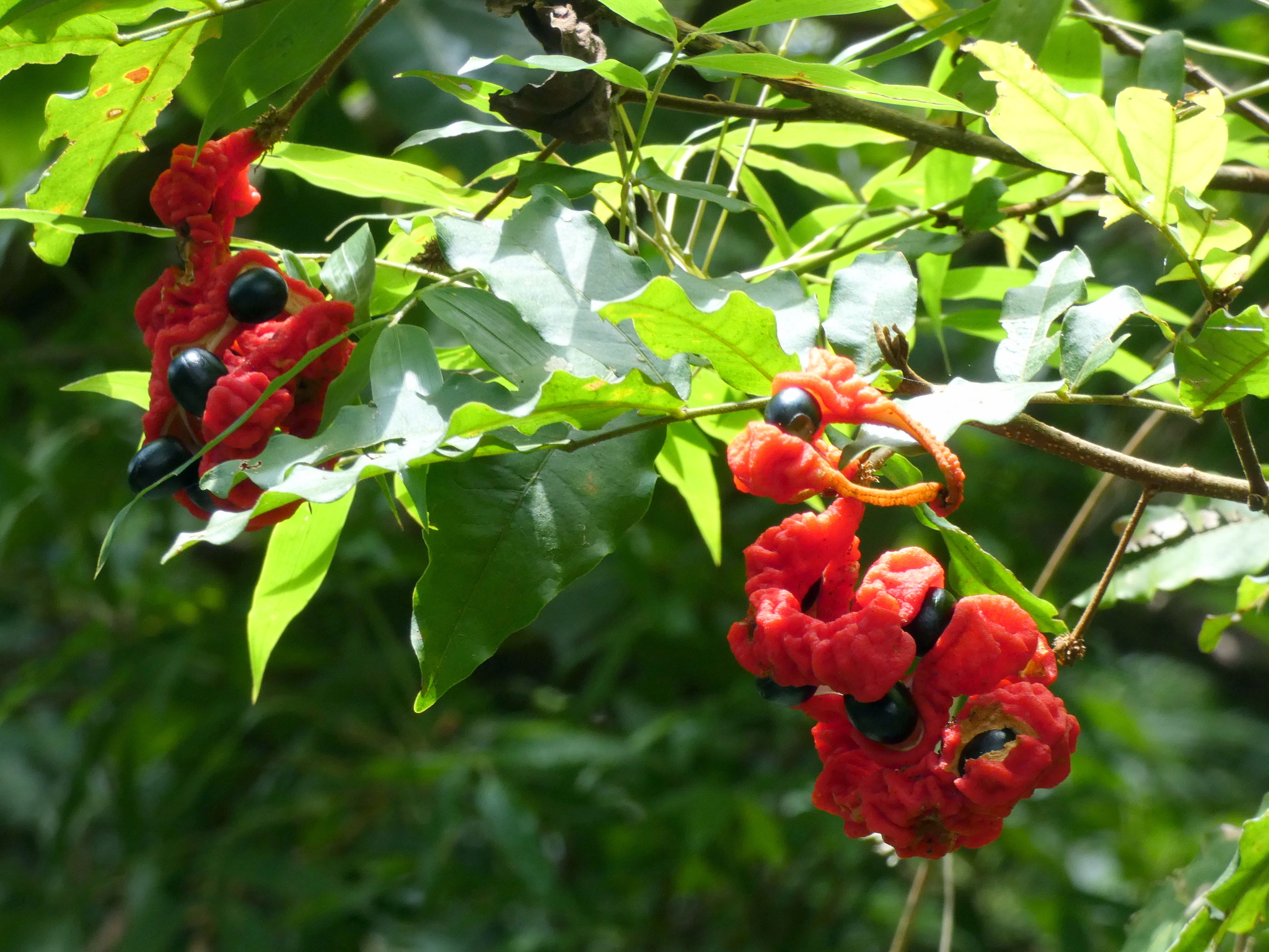
- In Panama

Conservation status
- Least Concern (IUCN 3.1)

Scientific classification
- Kingdom: Plantae
- Clade: Tracheophytes
- Clade: Angiosperms
- Clade: Eudicots
- Clade: Rosids
- Order: Fabales
- Family: Fabaceae
- Subfamily: Caesalpinioideae
- Clade: Mimosoid clade
- Genus: Cojoba
- Species: C. rufescens

Binomial name
- Cojoba rufescens (Benth.) Britt. & Rose

= Cojoba rufescens =

Species of legume

Cojoba rufescens is a species of flowering plant in the family Fabaceae. It is found in Colombia, Costa Rica, Ecuador, and Panama.
