= Central Volcanic Mountain Range Forest Reserve =

Protected area in Costa Rica

- Reserva Forestal Cordillera Volcánica Central
- IUCN category VI (protected area with sustainable use of natural resources)
- Location within Costa Rica
- Location: Costa Rica
- Coordinates: 10.137°N 83.897°W
- Area: 586.22 square kilometres (226.34 sq mi)
- Established: 26 June 1975
- Governing body: National System of Conservation Areas (SINAC)

Central Volcanic Mountain Range Forest Reserve (Spanish: Reserva Forestal Cordillera Volcánica Central), is a protected area in Costa Rica, managed under the Central Conservation Area, it was created in 1975 by decree 4961-A.
