= El Chayote Protected Zone =

Protected area in Costa Rica

- Zona Protectora El Chayote
- IUCN category VI (protected area with sustainable use of natural resources)
- Location within Costa Rica
- Location: Costa Rica
- Coordinates: 10.176°N 84.351°W
- Area: 7.66 square kilometres (2.96 sq mi)
- Established: 3 December 1984
- Governing body: National System of Conservation Areas (SINAC)

El Chayote Protected Zone (Spanish: Zona Protectora El Chayote), is a protected area in Costa Rica, managed under the Central Conservation Area, it was created in 1984 by law 6975.
