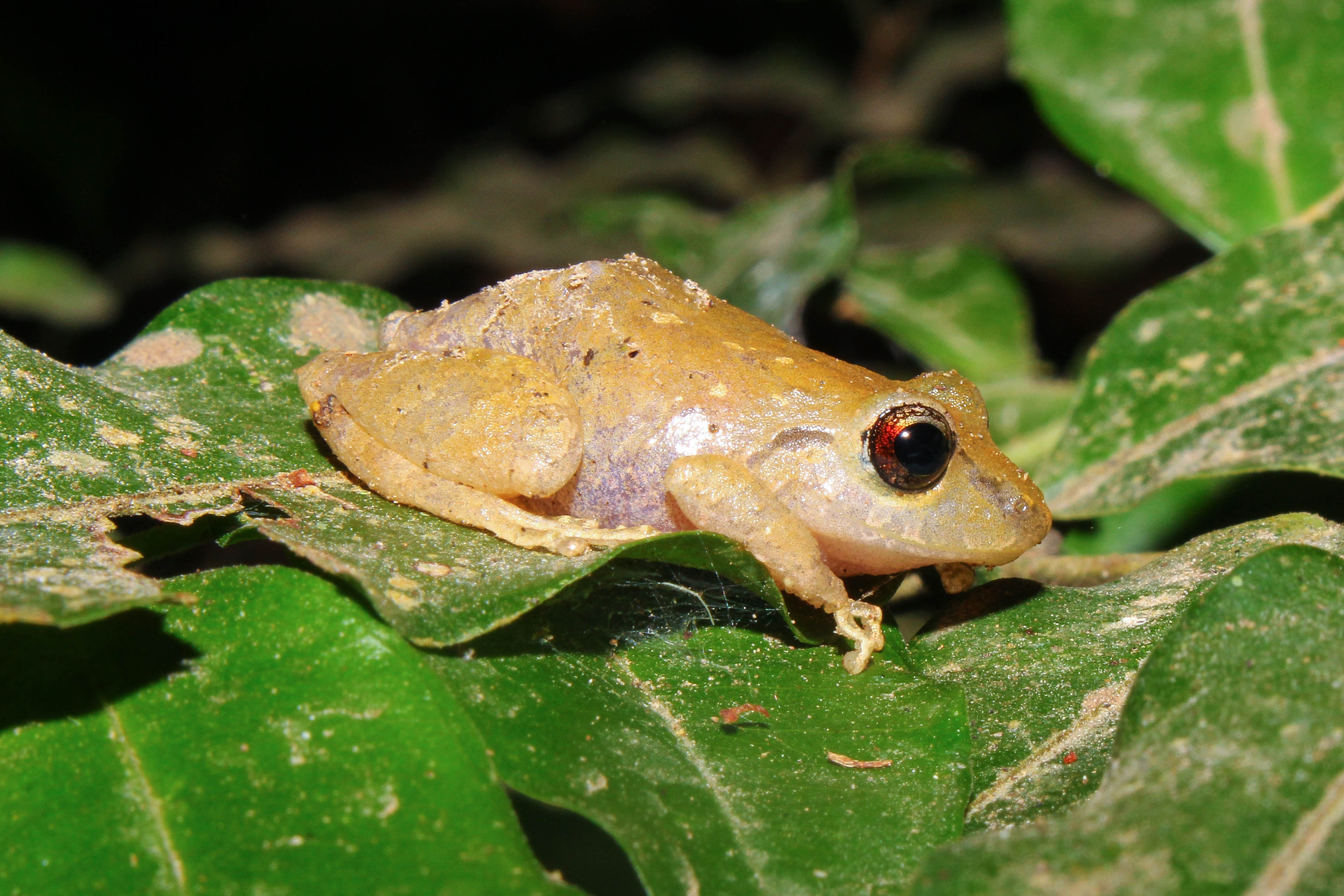

Conservation status
- Least Concern (IUCN 3.1)

Scientific classification
- Kingdom: Animalia
- Phylum: Chordata
- Class: Amphibia
- Order: Anura
- Family: Strabomantidae
- Genus: Pristimantis
- Species: P. ridens

Binomial name
- Pristimantis ridens (Cope, 1866)

Synonyms
- Phyllobates ridens Cope, 1866; Hypodictyon ridens Cope, 1885; Eleutherodactylus ridens (Cope, 1866)

= Pristimantis ridens =

Species of frog

Pristimantis ridens, also known as the pygmy rain frog and the Rio San Juan robber frog, is a species of frog in the family Strabomantidae. It is found in Nicaragua, Costa Rica, Panama and western Colombia.

== Taxonomy ==
The first description of the species was published in 1866 by Edward Drinker Cope, who placed it in the genus Phyllobates. The holotype was collected by Robert Kennicott, with the type locality being the San Juan River of Nicaragua. The holotype was deposited into the collection of the United States National Museum, but has since been lost. In 1885, Cope erected the genus Hypodictyon and moved ridens to it.

In 1888, George Albert Boulenger moved the species to Syrrhophus; (Note: Misspelled as Syrrhopus by Boulenger.) a genus erected by Cope in 1878 that was later deemed to be synonymous with Eleutherodactylus by George S. Myers in 1962, which was ignored by other writers until 1989, when Stephen Blair Hedges published a paper coming to the same conclusion and treating Syrrhophus as a subgenus of Eleutherodactylus.

By the time that synonymy was established, Edward Harrison Taylor had already moved the species to Eleutherodactylus, doing so in 1952; however, due to a different synonymy, the first placement of the species into Eleutherodactylus had occurred even earlier. In 1931, Emmett Reid Dunn moved Syrrhophus lutosus, (Note: Later deemed to be synonymous with Pristimantis cruentus.) which he and Thomas Barbour had described in 1921, to Eleutherodactylus. He did this while also treating Syrrhopus molinoi , (Note: Misspelling of Syrrhophus by Barbour.) described by Thomas Barbour in 1929 and established to be synonymous with Eleutherodactylus ridens by John D. Lynch in 1980, as a subspecies of lutosus, a decision Jay M. Savage later called "obviously incorrect".

The species was moved to Prismantis in 2007 by S. Blair Hedges, Matthew P. Heinicke and William E. Duellman, and the following year the three resurrected the name Hypodictyon as a subgenus within Prismantis.

== Description ==
Pristimantis ridens are small frogs, with males growing to 19 mm (0.75 in) and females to 25 mm (0.98 in) in snout–vent length. The dorsal skin is smooth and pale brown or yellow in colour, with some pink undertones. There is often a slightly darker W-shaped patch just behind the head. Individuals may have a single or two, parallel dorsolateral stripes. The thighs are barred. The ventral colouration is yellow with some dark specks.

Pristimantis ridens can be very similar to Pristimantis cruentus.

== Distribution and habitat ==
P. ridens is found in Nicaragua, Costa Rica, Panama and on the western slopes of the Cordillera Occidental of Colombia. The species' natural habitats are humid lowland and montane forests to about 1,600 m (5,200 ft) above sea level. It also occurs disturbed habitats such as degraded secondary vegetation, plantations, rural gardens, and urban areas.
