= Villa Grande (disambiguation) =

Villa Grande may refer to:

- Villa Grande, a property on Bygdøy in Oslo
- Villa Grande, California, an unincorporated community in Sonoma County, California, United States
- Villa Grande, a property on the Via Appia Antica, in Rome. Bought in 1972, the villa hosted Valentino and Franco Zeffirelli.

== See also ==
- Villa (disambiguation)
- Grande (disambiguation)
