= Grande (surname) =

The surname Grande or Del Grande is a surname of Spanish or Italian origin and may refer to:

- Andrés Grande (born 1976), Argentine former footballer
- Ariana Grande (born 1993), American singer, songwriter and actress
- Facón Grande (1883–1921), Argentine worker and syndicalist
- Frankie Grande (born 1983), American actor, singer, dancer, television personality and half-brother of Ariana Grande
- George Grande, American sportscaster who hosted the very first broadcast of SportsCenter on ESPN in 1979
- Hilde Grande (born 1975), Norwegian politician
- Johnny Grande (born John A. Grande, 1930–2006), member of Bill Haley's backing band, The Comets
- Lance Grande (born 1951), American evolutionary biologist
- Louis Del Grande (born 1943), Canadian television writer and actor
- Matías Grande (born 2004), Mexican archer
- Mike Del Grande (born 1953), Canadian politician
- Rita Grande (born 1975), Italian professional tennis player
- Rutilio Grande (1928–1977), Salvadoran Jesuit priest
- Sandro Grande (born 1977), Canadian soccer player
- Sean Grande (born 1969), American television and radio sportscaster
- Sidney Grande (1927–2016), American football coach
- Svante Grände (1947–1975), Swedish aid worker and guerrilla fighter in Latin America during the 1970s.
- Toni Grande (born 1947), retired Spanish football player
- Tony Grande (1943–2006), politician in Ontario, Canada
- Xavi Grande (born 2005), Spanish footballer

Stage names

- João Grande (born João Oliveira dos Santos, 1933), Grão-Mestre of the Afro-Brazilian martial art of capoeira Angola
- Jono El Grande (born Jon Andreas Håtun, 1973), autodidactic Norwegian composer, band leader, guitarist and conductor

== See also ==
- Grande (disambiguation)
