= Cojoba graciliflora =

Conservation status
- Least Concern (IUCN 3.1)

Scientific classification
- Kingdom: Plantae
- Clade: Embryophytes
- Clade: Tracheophytes
- Clade: Angiosperms
- Clade: Eudicots
- Clade: Rosids
- Order: Fabales
- Family: Fabaceae
- Subfamily: Caesalpinioideae
- Clade: Mimosoid clade
- Genus: Cojoba
- Species: C. graciliflora

Binomial name
- Cojoba graciliflora (S.F.Blake) (Britton and Rose)

Species of flowering plant

Cojoba graciliflora is a species in the Cojoba genus in the family Fabaceae.
