= Tapiria Wildlife Refuge =

Protected area in Costa Rica

- Refugio de Vida Silvestre Tapiria
- Location within Costa Rica
- Location: Costa Rica
- Coordinates: 10.533°N 84.033°W
- Area: 1.30 square kilometres (0.50 sq mi)
- Established: 12 April 2011
- Governing body: National System of Conservation Areas (SINAC)

Tapiria Wildlife Refuge (Spanish: Refugio de Vida Silvestre Tapiria), is a protected area in Costa Rica, managed under the Central Conservation Area, it was created in 2011 by decree 36681-MINAET.
