= Cerro San Miguel =

Mountain in Costa Rica

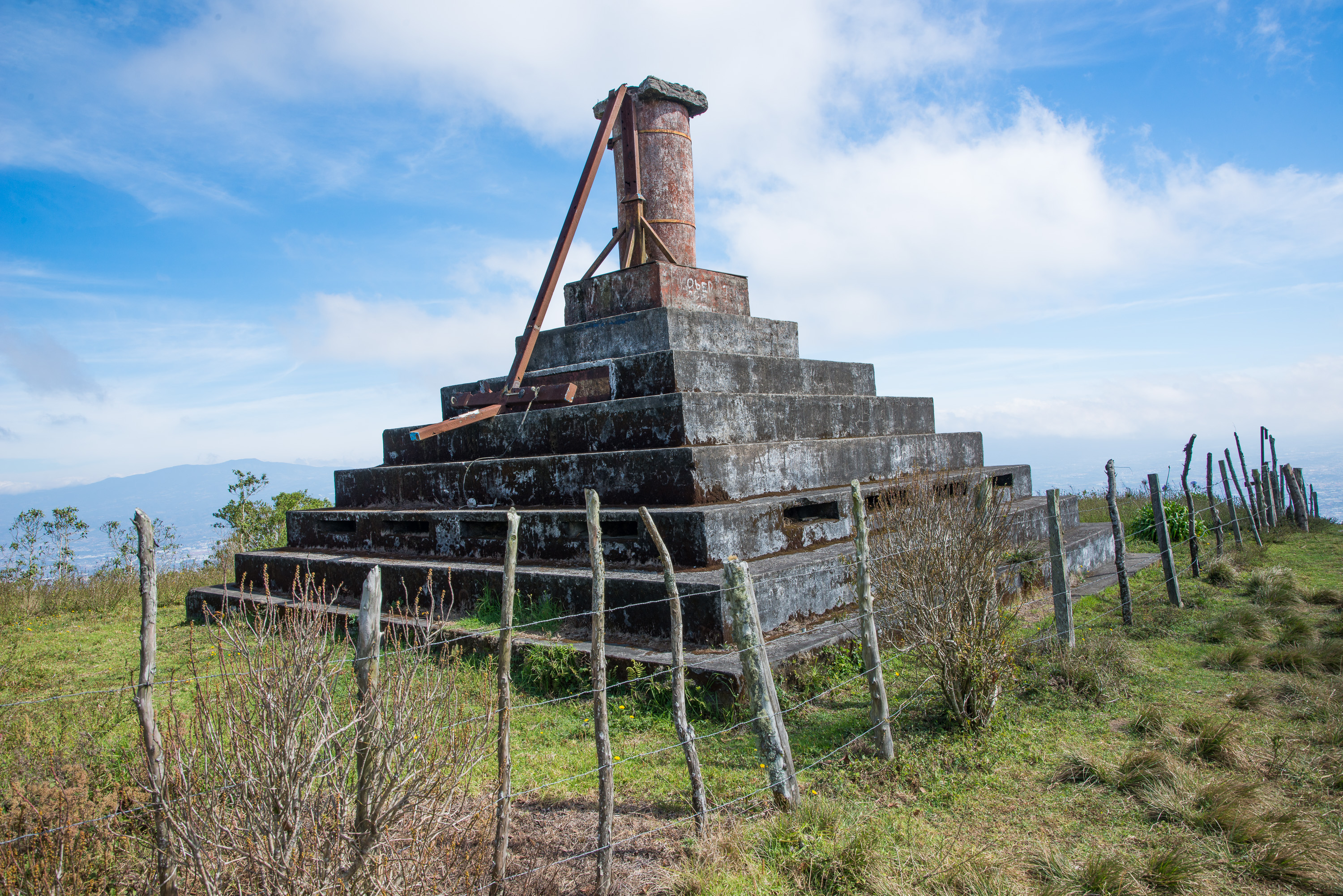
Cruz de Alajuelita in March 2018

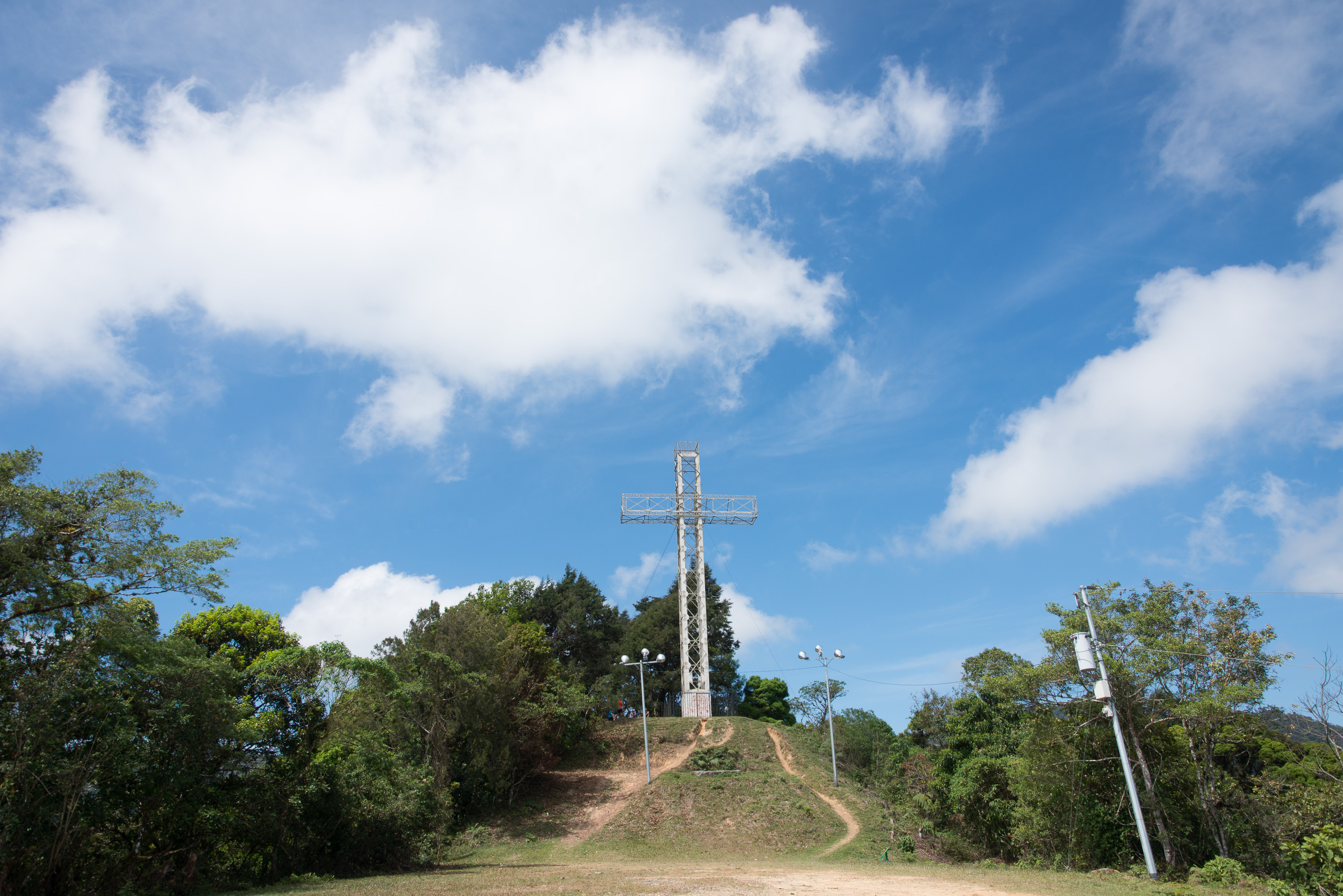
New Cruz de Alajuelita on March 18, 2018

Cerro San Miguel is the fourth highest mountain of the Cerros de Escazú in Costa Rica at 2,035 m (6,677 ft). San Miguel makes reference to Saint Michael.

In 1933 a 26-meter-tall iron cross was installed on the top of the mountain, and is known as the Cross of Alajuelita. It has been lighted by night since 1984 and has become a reference point in the Central Valley, from where it can be seen to the south. The cross is a popular pilgrimage destination and can be easily visited on a one-day hike.

Locally, this mountain is known as "La Cruz," because of the large cross that has been built at the very peak. There are three crosses in total. The first one is made from concrete. The second one is a steel cross set atop a concrete pyramid. The third, which is at the peak, is the tallest of the three and is made of steel. From the top vantage, it is possible to see almost the entire Central Valley, including the city of San José.

== See also ==
- Cerro Rabo de Mico
- Cerro Cedral
- Cerro Pico Alto
- Cerro Pico Blanco
