= Loma Grande =

Loma Grande may refer to:

- Loma Grande District, in Paraguay
- Loma Grande, Mexico
- Loma Grande (borough), in Merlo, Buenos Aires

== See also ==
- Loma (disambiguation)
- Grande (disambiguation)
