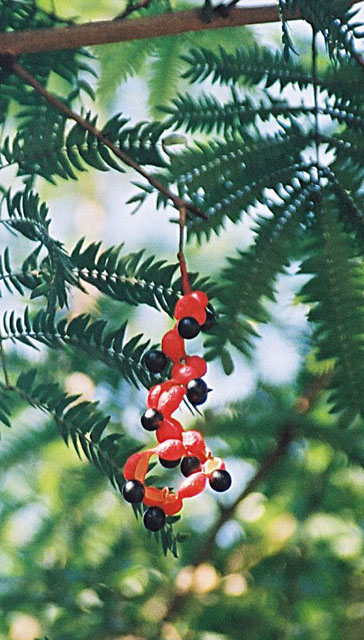

Conservation status
- Least Concern (IUCN 3.1)

Scientific classification
- Kingdom: Plantae
- Clade: Tracheophytes
- Clade: Angiosperms
- Clade: Eudicots
- Clade: Rosids
- Order: Fabales
- Family: Fabaceae
- Subfamily: Caesalpinioideae
- Clade: Mimosoid clade
- Genus: Cojoba
- Species: C. arborea

Binomial name
- Cojoba arborea L. (Britton and Rose)

Synonyms
- Mimosa arborea L.; Pithecellobium arboreum (Linn) Urban; Acacia arborea (L.) Willd.; Pithecolobium arboreum (L.) Urb.; Pithecellobium confertum

= Cojoba arborea =

Species of legume

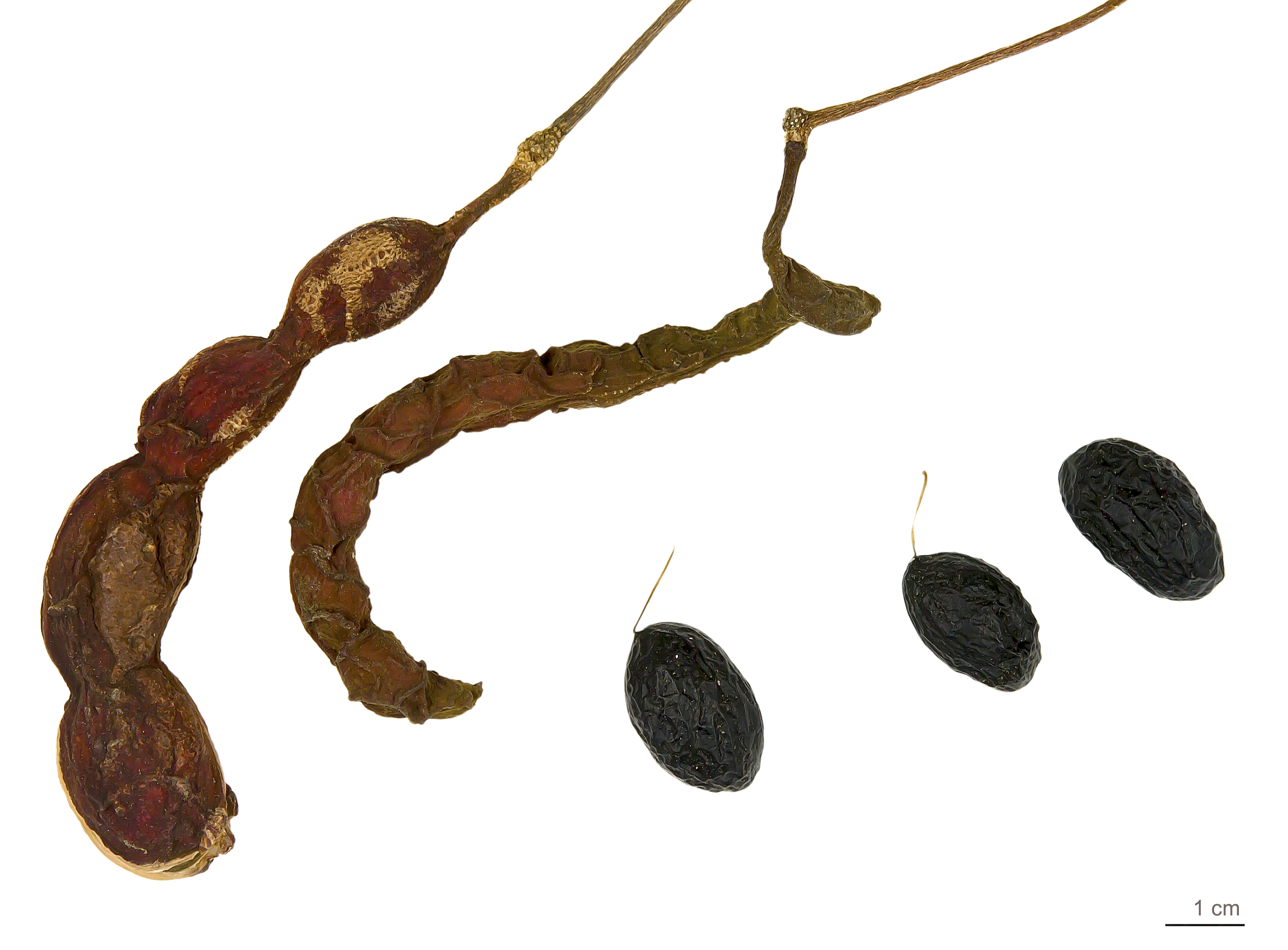
Cojoba arborea - MHNT

Cojoba arborea, the wild tamarind, royal mahogany, everfresh tree, or lorito, is a leguminous tree of the family Fabaceae found in the Caribbean, Mexico, and Central America, southward to Ecuador in South America at elevations to 1,300 m (4,300 ft). The tree is not common in naturalized forests, but it can be found in open sites and transition zones.

== Description ==
It can grow 15–18 metres (49–59 ft) tall with a trunk diameter to 50 centimetres (20 in). The curved pod of the mature fruit is reddish-purple and 13–17 centimetres (5.1–6.7 in) long, carrying 4-6 black and/or white ellipsoidal seeds per pod. Leaves are alternate, bipinnate with 8-16 pairs of leaflets, non-serrated, elliptical, 28–42 centimetres (11–17 in) long. The leaflets are on average 0.2 centimetres (0.079 in) wide by 4–6 centimetres (1.6–2.4 in) long. Flower inflorescences are white, hermaphroditic, 0.6–0.9 centimetres (0.24–0.35 in) long, with peduncles 5–10 centimetres (2.0–3.9 in) long. The flowering period is from April to June.

== Wood ==
The cambium is clear and the cortex is a clear-brown color. The wood is heavy but easy to work. The grains are regular but tend to crack when the wood is dry. The lumber is dimensionally stable when dry. It is resistant to attack by insects and very durable. The lumber is used for heavy construction, stakes and posts, fine carpentry, flooring, stairways, plywood sheets, paper manufacture, cabinetry and other applications. The price of the wood is stable and has a tendency to increase in value. The wood is exported to the United States under the name of Bahamas sibucú.

== Silviculture ==
The seeds are not viable long after pod maturity, with 80% viability after 10 days of storage and 0% viability after 25 days of storage. If the seeds are fresh, 90% of them germinate in soil containing 30% organic matter. Viable seeds germinate 22 days after planting. They tend to tolerate a wide range of pH conditions, from 4.8 to 8.0. Trees can be planted at 5–8 months after seed germination when the roots have extended to the bottom of the growing bags. Plantations need to be started during the rainy season.
