= Cerro Cedral =

Mountain in Costa Rica

- Location within Costa Rica

Highest point
- Elevation: 2,420 m (7,940 ft)
- Coordinates: 09°53′N 84°11′W

Geography
- Location: San José Province, Costa Rica
- Parent range: Cerros de Escazú

The Cerro Cedral is the second highest mountain of the Cerros de Escazú, Costa Rica with 2,420 m (7,940 ft). Cedral means 'cedar forest' referring to an endangered tree species locally known as Cedro Dulce, which occurs there.

This mountain marks the southern limit of Escazú as a canton and of San José as a province.

The Agres river rises from the Cerro Cedral.

On January 15, 1990 a Sansa Airlines flight crashed into the Cerro Cedral killing all 23 crew and passengers on board. The pilot, flying a CASA C-212 Aviocar, was later determined to be under excessive fatigue at the moment.

== See also ==
- Rabo de Mico
- Cerro Pico Alto
- Cerro Pico Blanco
- Cerro San Miguel
