= Fernando Castro Cervantes Mixed Wildlife Refuge =

Protected area in Costa Rica

- Refugio de Vida Silvestre Fernando Castro Cervantes
- IUCN category IV (habitat/species management area)
- Location within Costa Rica
- Location: Costa Rica
- Coordinates: 9.794°N 84.521°W
- Area: 14.17 square kilometres (5.47 sq mi)
- Established: 16 February 1994
- Governing body: National System of Conservation Areas (SINAC)

Fernando Castro Cervantes Mixed Wildlife Refuge (Spanish: Refugio de Vida Silvestre Fernando Castro Cervantes), is a protected area in Costa Rica, managed under the Central Conservation Area, it was created in 1994 by decree 22848-MIRENEM.
