= Toro River Protected Zone =

Protected area in Costa Rica

- Zona Protectora Río Toro
- IUCN category VI (protected area with sustainable use of natural resources)
- Location within Costa Rica
- Location: Costa Rica
- Coordinates: 10.206°N 84.288°W
- Area: 43.95 square kilometres (16.97 sq mi)
- Established: 9 February 1994
- Governing body: National System of Conservation Areas (SINAC)

Toro River Protected Zone (Spanish: Zona Protectora Río Toro), is a protected area in Costa Rica, managed under the Central Conservation Area, it was created in 1994 by decree 22838-MIRENEM.
