= Nara Hill Protected Zone =

Protected area in Costa Rica

- Zona Protectora Cerro Nara
- IUCN category VI (protected area with sustainable use of natural resources)
- Location within Costa Rica
- Location: Costa Rica
- Coordinates: 9.492°N 84.014°W
- Area: 23.13 square kilometres (8.93 sq mi)
- Established: 3 December 1984
- Governing body: National System of Conservation Areas (SINAC)

Nara Hill Protected Zone (Spanish: Zona Protectora Cerro Nara), is a protected area in Costa Rica, managed under the Central Conservation Area, it was created in 1984 by law 6975 Art. 12.
