= Central Conservation Area =

Conservation area in Costa Rica

- Área de Conservación Central
- Location of the area, labeled ACC in the center of the country.
- Location: San José Province, Alajuela Province, Cartago Province, Heredia Province, Puntarenas Province, Costa Rica
- Coordinates: 10.1000°N 84.0833°W
- Governing body: National System of Conservation Areas (SINAC)
- Website: https://www.sinac.go.cr/EN-US

Central Conservation Area (Spanish: Área de Conservación Central (ACC)), is an administrative area which is managed by SINAC for the purposes of conservation in the central part of Costa Rica, notably the volcanic areas of the Cordillera Central. It contains six National Parks, several wildlife refuges, and other types of nature reserves.

== Protected areas ==
- Alberto Manuel Brenes Biological Reserve
- Atenas Hill Protected Zone
- Bosque Alegre Wildlife Refuge
- Braulio Carrillo National Park
- Caraigres Protected Zone
- Carpintera Hills Protected Zone
- Central Volcanic Mountain Range Forest Reserve
- Dantas Hill Private Wildlife Refuge
- El Chayote Protected Zone
- El Rodeo Protected Zone
- Escazú Hills Protected Zone
- Fernando Castro Cervantes Mixed Wildlife Refuge
- Grande River Protected Zone
- Grecia Forest Reserve
- Guayabo National Monument
- Irazú Volcano National Park
- La Selva Wildlife Refuge
- La Tirimbina Wildlife Refuge
- Los Quetzales National Park
- Los Santos Forest Reserve (shared with Pacific La Amistad Conservation Area)
- Macho River Forest Reserve
- Nara Hill Protected Zone
- Poás Volcano National Park
- Quitirrisí Protected Zone
- Rosario Creek Protected Zone
- Sombrero River–Navarro River Protected Zone
- Tapantí-Cerro de la Muerte Massif National Park
- Tapiria Wildlife Refuge
- Tiribí River Protected Zone
- Toro River Protected Zone
- Tuís River Basin Protected Zone
- Turrialba Volcano National Park
- Turrubares Hills Protected Zone
- Vueltas Hill Biological Reserve

== See also ==
- Jaguarundi Wildlife Refuge, a private refuge in the area.
