= Atenas Hill Protected Zone =

Protected area in Costa Rica

- Zona Protectora Cerro Atenas
- IUCN category VI (protected area with sustainable use of natural resources)
- Location within Costa Rica
- Location: Costa Rica
- Coordinates: 9.956°N 84.423°W
- Area: 9.0 square kilometres (3.5 sq mi)
- Established: 17 July 1976
- Governing body: National System of Conservation Areas (SINAC)

Atenas Hill Protected Zone (Spanish: Zona Protectora Cerro Atenas) is a protected area in Costa Rica, managed under the Central Conservation Area. It was created in 1976 under executive decree 6112-A.
