= La Tirimbina Wildlife Refuge =

Protected area in Costa Rica

- Refugio de Vida Silvestre La Tirimbina
- Location within Costa Rica
- Location: Costa Rica
- Coordinates: 10.412°N 84.113°W
- Area: 2.94 square kilometres (1.14 sq mi)
- Established: 4 December 2001
- Governing body: National System of Conservation Areas (SINAC)

La Tirimbina Wildlife Refuge (Spanish: Refugio de Vida Silvestre La Tirimbina), is a protected area in Costa Rica, managed under the Central Conservation Area, it was created in 2001 by decree 29998-MINAE.
