= Cerro Pico Alto =

Mountain in Costa Rica

Coordinates: 9°51′N 84°08′W

The Cerro Pico Alto is the third highest mountain of the Cerros de Escazú, Costa Rica with 2,428 m (7,966 ft). Pico Alto means high peak.

== See also ==
- Cerro Cedral
- Cerro Pico Blanco
- Cerro Rabo de Mico
- Cerro San Miguel
