= Dantas Hill Private Wildlife Refuge =

Protected area in Costa Rica

- Refugio de Vida Silvestre Privado Cerro Dantas
- Location within Costa Rica
- Location: Costa Rica
- Coordinates: 10.097°N 84.059°W
- Area: 0.46 square kilometres (0.18 sq mi)
- Established: 16 February 1998
- Governing body: National System of Conservation Areas (SINAC)

Dantas Hill Private Wildlife Refuge (Spanish: Refugio de Vida Silvestre Privado Cerro Dantas), is a protected area in Costa Rica, managed under the Central Conservation Area, it was created in 1998 by decree 26661-MINAE.
