= Carpintera Hills Protected Zone =

Protected area in Costa Rica

- Zona Protectora Cerros de la Carpintera
- IUCN category VI (protected area with sustainable use of natural resources)
- Location within Costa Rica
- Location: Costa Rica
- Coordinates: 9.881°N 83.985°W
- Area: 23.9 square kilometres (9.2 sq mi)
- Established: 17 July 1976
- Governing body: National System of Conservation Areas (SINAC)

Carpintera Hills Protected Zone (Spanish: Zona Protectora Cerros de la Carpintera), is a protected area in Costa Rica, managed under the Central Conservation Area, it was created in 1976 by executive decree 6112-A.
