= Escazú Hills Protected Zone =

Protected area in Costa Rica

- Zona Protectora Cerros de Escazú
- IUCN category VI (protected area with sustainable use of natural resources)
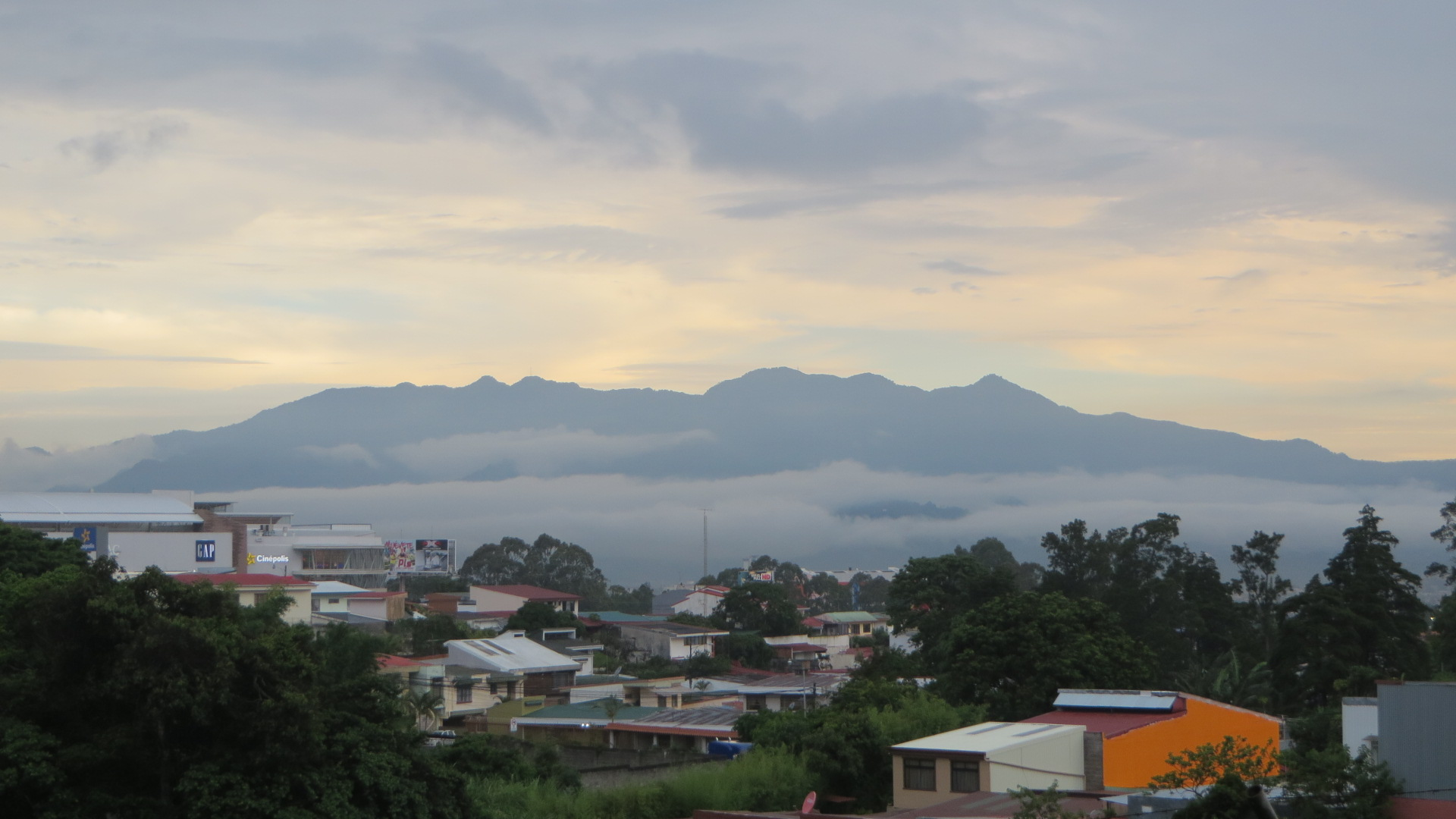
- Cerros de Escazú, viewed from San José

- Location within Costa Rica
- Location: Costa Rica
- Coordinates: 9.879°N 84.176°W
- Area: 71.65 square kilometres (27.66 sq mi)
- Established: 17 July 1976
- Governing body: National System of Conservation Areas (SINAC)

Escazú Hills Protected Zone (Spanish: Zona Protectora Cerros de Escazú), is a protected area in Costa Rica, managed under the Central Conservation Area, it was created in 1976 by executive decree 6112-A.
