= Río Grande District =

Río Grande District may refer to:

- Río Grande District, Condesuyos, Peru
- Río Grande District, Palpa, Peru
