= Sombrero River–Navarro River Protected Zone =

Protected area in Costa Rica

- Zona Protectora Río Sombrero-Río Navarro
- Location within Costa Rica
- Location: Costa Rica
- Coordinates: 9.773310°N 83.967046°W
- Area: 64.17 square kilometres (24.78 sq mi)
- Established: 9 June 1984
- Governing body: National System of Conservation Areas (SINAC)

Sombrero River–Navarro River Protected Zone (Spanish: Zona Protectora Río Sombrero-Río Navarro), is a protected area in Costa Rica, managed under the Central Conservation Area, it was created in 1984 by executive decree 15436-MAG.
