= Grande-Rivière, Jura =

Grande-Rivière
- Part of Grande-Rivière Château
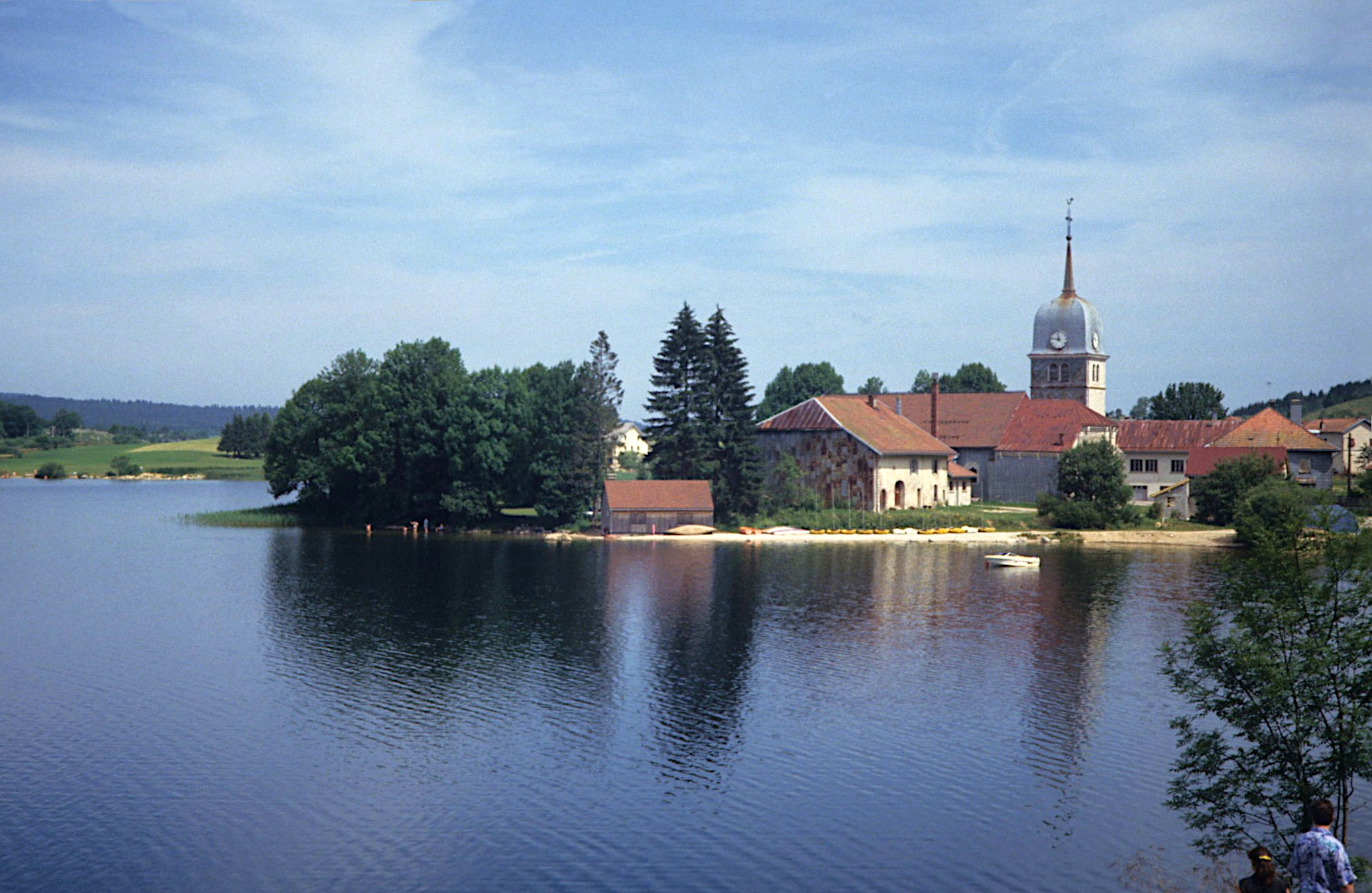
- Lac de l'Abbaye
- Location of Grande-Rivière
- Location within France Location within Bourgogne-Franche-Comté
- Coordinates: 46°32′30″N 5°54′49″E
- Country: France
- Region: Bourgogne-Franche-Comté
- Department: Jura
- Arrondissement: Saint-Claude
- Canton: Saint-Laurent-en-Grandvaux
- Commune: Grande-Rivière Château
- Area^{1}: 30.59 km^{2} (11.81 sq mi)
- Highest elevation: 1,152 m (3,780 ft)
- Lowest elevation: 846 m (2,776 ft)
- Population (2023): 442
  - Density: 14.4/km^{2} (37.4/sq mi)
- Time zone: UTC+01:00 (CET)
  - Summer (DST): UTC+02:00 (CEST)
- Postal code: 39150
- ^{1} French Land Register data, which excludes lakes, ponds, glaciers > 1 km^{2} (0.386 sq mi or 247 acres) and river estuaries.

Grande-Rivière (French pronunciation: [ɡʁɑ̃d ʁivjɛʁ], literally Great River) is a former commune in the Jura department in Bourgogne-Franche-Comté in eastern France. On 1 January 2019, it was merged into the new commune Grande-Rivière Château.

== See also ==
- Communes of the Jura department
