= Salto Grande =

Salto Grande may refer to:

- Salto Grande, São Paulo, a municipality in Brazil
- Salto Grande (waterfall), within the Torres del Paine National Park in Chile
- Salto Grande Dam, on the Uruguay River, between Uruguay and Argentina
- Salto Grande Bridge, crossing the Uruguay River, joining Argentina and Uruguay
