= Caraigres Protected Zone =

Protected area in Costa Rica

- Zona Protectora Caraigres
- IUCN category VI (protected area with sustainable use of natural resources)
- Location within Costa Rica
- Location: Costa Rica
- Coordinates: 9.725°N 84.145°W
- Area: 32.04 square kilometres (12.37 sq mi)
- Established: 17 July 1976
- Governing body: National System of Conservation Areas (SINAC)

Caraigres Protected Zone (Spanish: Zona Protectora Caraigres), is a protected area in Costa Rica, managed under the Central Conservation Area, it was created in 1976 under executive decree 6112-A.
