= Alberto Manuel Brenes Biological Reserve =

Nature reserve in central Costa Rica

- Alberto Manuel Brenes Biological Reserve
- Location: Costa Rica
- Coordinates: 10.2401°N 84.6306°W
- Area: 19,260 acres (78 km^{2})
- Established: 20 August 1993
- Governing body: National System of Conservation Areas (SINAC)
- Location in Costa Rica

Alberto Manuel Brenes Biological Reserve is a nature reserve in the central part of Costa Rica. It is part of the Central Conservation Area; which protects tropical forest area near San Ramon. The reserve operates under the direction of the University of Costa Rica and the Ministry of Environment and Energy (MINAE).

== History ==
The Alberto Manuel Brenes Biological Reserve (RBAMB) was created in 1975 by executive decree number 4960-A as the Reserva Forestal de San Ramón (San Ramon Forest Reserve). In 1991, by the executive decree number 20172-M was redefined as the San Ramón Protection Zone. Finally, on 20 August 1993, by the law number 7354, was officially published in the government official newspaper, La Gaceta, as the Alberto Manuel Brenes Biological Reserve.

== Administration ==
For the administration of the Reserve, the Council of the University of Costa Rica at San Ramón (known as West Branch) approved in Session No. 521 of June 9, 1993, the Standards for the management of the station Alberto Manuel Brenes Biological Reserve. Part of this article indicates that the RBAMB must be administered by a director, who shall be a professor at the headquarters of the west branch. In addition, there is an advisory committee called the General Advisory Committee and Technical Research Advisory Committee.

The General Advisory Committee consists of the Research Coordinator, the Director of the Department of Natural Sciences, the Director of the reserve, the director of the Biology Section and a professor of this section. Part of the activities of this committee are: promoting and approving the different programs or operating plans for the management of the Reserve and determine the fees for the use of facilities and decide on the distribution of resources economic as well as improvements to be promoted in their facilities. The current director is Biologist M.Sc. Ronald Sánchez Porras.

== Research and publications ==
Most of the publications (45%) are associated with plants, 12.6% with fungi and lichens, 2.5% birds, 11.4% to arthropods, 3.8% to reptiles and amphibians, 16.4% with soils, nutrients and climate, 7% with administrative and outreach, and 1.3% in phytochemistry. There is a dominance of plant ecology issues, ecophysiology, plant diversity and minerals on plants.

== Hydrology ==
The upper basin of the San Lorenzo River has an area of approximately 16,280 Ha of which around 7600 Ha are inside the RBAMB, representing almost 47% of the total area of the basin. It is possible to define five sub-basins, each of which is stocked by an extensive drainage network composed of creeks and streams, namely: San Lorenzo River, San Lorencito River, Jamaical River, Rio Grande and Quebrada Palmital. This water body is used for hydroelectric power generation by the San Lorenzo Coneléctricas Company .

== Habitats ==
According to the classification system of Holdridge life zones (1967), just over 80% of the total area of the reserve is located in the Premontane rainforest, about 10% corresponds to the life zone of Lower montane rainforest, which corresponds to the upper parts of the row of dead volcanos and mountains in the north eastern boundary, a small percentage (less than 1%) on the southern boundary corresponds to the life zone of the Very humid Premontane forest. There are also identified two areas of transition to Premontane wet forest on the eastern boundary between the Palmital River and Jamaical River.

== Species ==
The reserve is home to the elusive frog Pristimantis altae.
