= Ribeira Grande =

Ribeira Grande may refer to the following places:

== Cape Verde ==
- Ribeira Grande (stream), a stream on the island of Santo Antão
- Ribeira Grande, Cape Verde, a town on the island of Santo Antão
- Ribeira Grande, Cape Verde (municipality), a municipality on the island of Santo Antão
- Ribeira Grande de Santiago, Cape Verde, a municipality on the island of Santiago

== Portugal ==
- Ribeira Grande (Azores), a municipality on the island of São Miguel, Azores
