= Arroio Grande (disambiguation) =

Arroio Grande (Portuguese meaning large creek or stream) may refer to:

- Arroio Grande, Rio Grande do Sul, Brazil
- Arroio Grande, district in Santa Maria, Brazil
  - Arroio Grande, neighborhood in this district
- Arroio Grande, river in Santa Catarina, Brazil
