= Grande-Rivière Château =

Commune in Bourgogne-Franche-Comté, France

- Commune
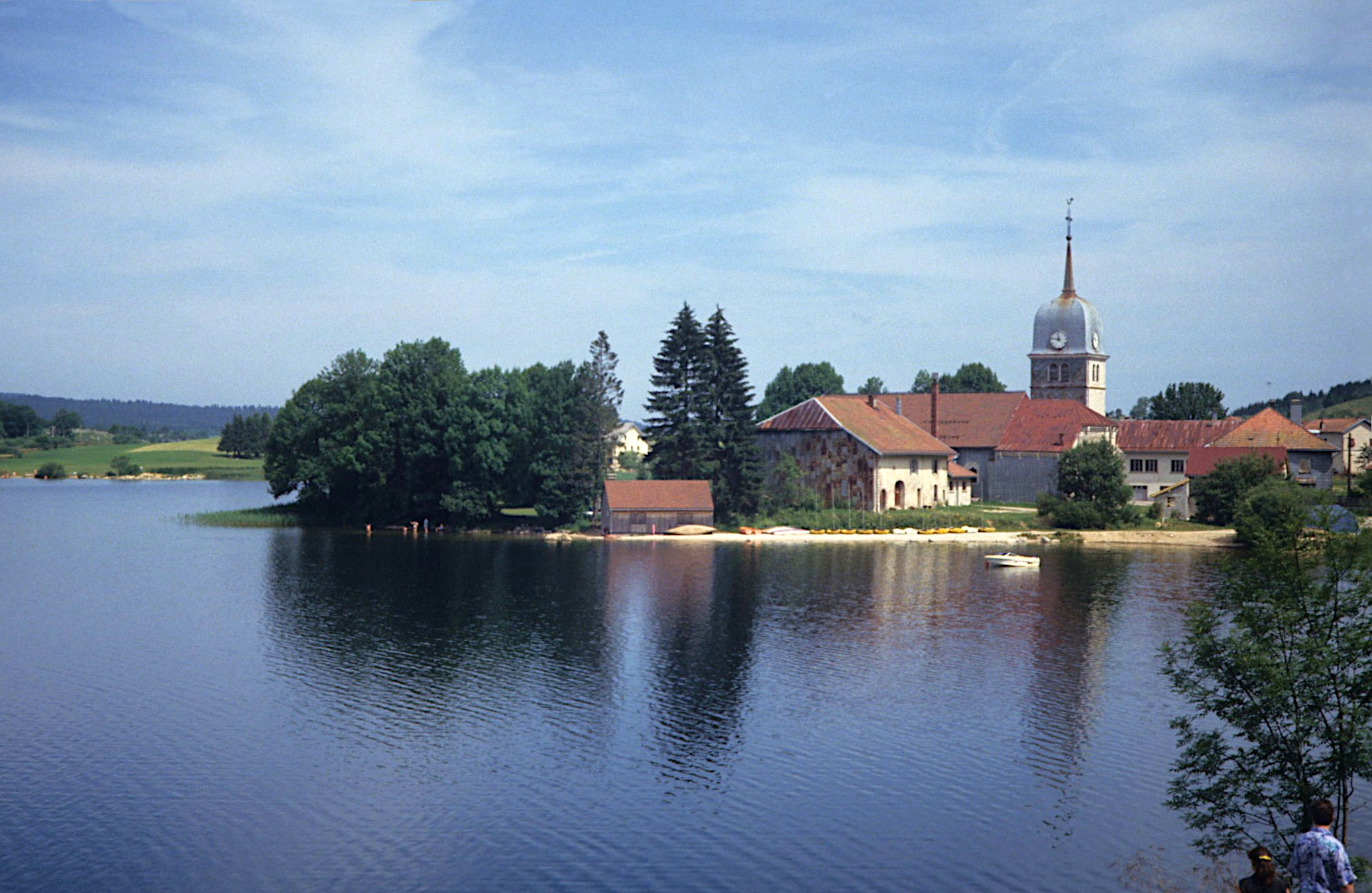
- Lac de l'Abbaye
- Location of Grande-Rivière Château
- Location within France Location within Bourgogne-Franche-Comté
- Coordinates: 46°32′30″N 5°54′49″E
- Country: France
- Region: Bourgogne-Franche-Comté
- Department: Jura
- Arrondissement: Saint-Claude
- Canton: Saint-Laurent-en-Grandvaux
- Area^{1}: 39.21 km^{2} (15.14 sq mi)
- Highest elevation: 1,152 m (3,780 ft)
- Lowest elevation: 846 m (2,776 ft)
- Population (2023): 644
  - Density: 16.4/km^{2} (42.5/sq mi)
- Time zone: UTC+01:00 (CET)
  - Summer (DST): UTC+02:00 (CEST)
- INSEE/Postal code: 39258 /39150
- ^{1} French Land Register data, which excludes lakes, ponds, glaciers > 1 km^{2} (0.386 sq mi or 247 acres) and river estuaries.

Grande-Rivière Château (French pronunciation: [ɡʁɑ̃d ʁivjɛʁ ʃato]) is a commune in the Jura department in Bourgogne-Franche-Comté in eastern France. It was established on 1 January 2019 by merger of the former communes of Grande-Rivière (the seat) and Château-des-Prés.

== See also ==
- Communes of the Jura department
