= Mojón Grande =

- Municipality and village
- Location within Misiones Province Location within Argentina
- Country: Argentina
- Province: Misiones Province
- Time zone: UTC−3 (ART)

Mojón Grande is a village and municipality in Misiones Province in north-eastern Argentina. It lies at a latitude of 27 ° 42 'South and a longitude of 55 ° 09' West.
