= Quitirrisí Protected Zone =

Protected area in Costa Rica

- Zona Protectora Quitirrisí
- IUCN category VI (protected area with sustainable use of natural resources)
- Location within Costa Rica
- Location: Costa Rica
- Coordinates: 9.877°N 84.245°W
- Area: 1.12 square kilometres (0.43 sq mi)
- Established: 24 May 1982
- Governing body: National System of Conservation Areas (SINAC)

Quitirrisí Protected Zone (Spanish: Zona Protectora Quitirrisí), is a protected area in Costa Rica, managed under the Central Conservation Area, it was created in 1982 by executive decree 13594-A.
