= Middle Rio Grande =

Middle Rio Grande may refer to:

- Middle Rio Grande Basin, a hydrological basin in central New Mexico
  - Middle Rio Grande Valley, the valley created by the river as it traverses the basin
- Middle Rio Grande Conservancy District, which manages irrigation and flood control in the Albuquerque basin of central New Mexico
- Middle Rio Grande Development Council, a voluntary association of cities, counties and special districts in southern Texas
- Middle Rio Grande Project, a set of irrigation, flood control and water conservation facilities in central New Mexico
- Middle Rio Grande Valley AVA, an American Viticultural Area located in the watershed of the Rio Grande in central New Mexico
- The middle of the Rio Grande
