= Great River (film) =

- Directed by: Matt LeMay
- Produced by: Matt LeMay
- Starring: Matt LeMay
- Narrated by: Matt LeMay
- Cinematography: Matt LeMay
- Edited by: Matt LeMay
- Distributed by: First Nations Films and McIntyre Media
- Release date: 2010
- Running time: 54 mins
- Country: Canada
- Language: English

Great River is a 2010 documentary film from director Matt LeMay and McIntyre Media. Great River won the 2011 Award of Excellence in Film making at the 2011 Canada International Film Festival.

== About the film ==
The film is about the treatment of First Nations people post Indian Act by the Canadian Government. The film also covers the defacing of indigenous rock art. A team of rock experts investigate the vandalism.

It was distributed by First Nations Films and McIntyre Media.

== Awards ==
- Canada International Film Festival 2011 Award of Excellence in Film making
- 2011 Write Brothers Screenplay Competition Winner, Documentary Competition.
- Social Media Marketing Award
