= Cerro Pico Blanco =

Mountain in Costa Rica

Coordinates: 9°17′N 83°02′W

The Cerro Pico Blanco is the second highest mountain of the Cerros de Escazú, Costa Rica, with a summit elevation of 2,271 m (7,451 ft). Pico Blanco literally means 'white peak', a reference to the rocky outcropping close to its highest point, which looks light gray from the Central Valley.

It is a good destination for a one-day hike and a potentially promising location for rock climbing.

There is no relation to the endangered, endemic Pico Blanco toad, as it is reported to be found further to the southeast.

On January 15, 1990, a plane carrying 21 people crashed near Pico Blanco, shortly after taking off from San Jose's Juan Santamaria Airport; all aboard died.

On November 25, 2024, another aircraft, a Cessna 206 Stationair, crashed near the area just after midday. Out of the six people on board, all Costa Ricans, one woman was rescued alive.

== See also ==
- Cerro Rabo de Mico
- Cerro Pico Alto
- Cerro San Miguel
