= Grecia Forest Reserve =

Protected area in Costa Rica

- Reserva Forestal Grecia
- IUCN category VI (protected area with sustainable use of natural resources)
- Location within Costa Rica
- Location: Costa Rica
- Coordinates: 10.162°N 84.266°W
- Area: 23.61 square kilometres (9.12 sq mi)
- Established: 25 January 1974
- Governing body: National System of Conservation Areas (SINAC)

Grecia Forest Reserve (Spanish: Reserva Forestal Grecia) is a protected area in Costa Rica, managed under the Central Conservation Area. It was created in 1974 by law 5463.
