= Turrubares Hills Protected Zone =

Protected area in Costa Rica

- Zona Protectora Cerros de Turrubares
- IUCN category VI (protected area with sustainable use of natural resources)
- Location within Costa Rica
- Location: Costa Rica
- Coordinates: 9.812°N 84.495°W
- Area: 29.05 square kilometres (11.22 sq mi)
- Established: 1 December 1983
- Governing body: National System of Conservation Areas (SINAC)

Turrubares Hills Protected Zone (Spanish: Zona Protectora Cerros de Turrubares), is a protected area in Costa Rica, managed under the Central Conservation Area, it was created in 1983 by law 6300 Art. 3.
