= Grand River Township, DeKalb County, Missouri =

Township in Missouri, U.S.

Grand River Township
- Township
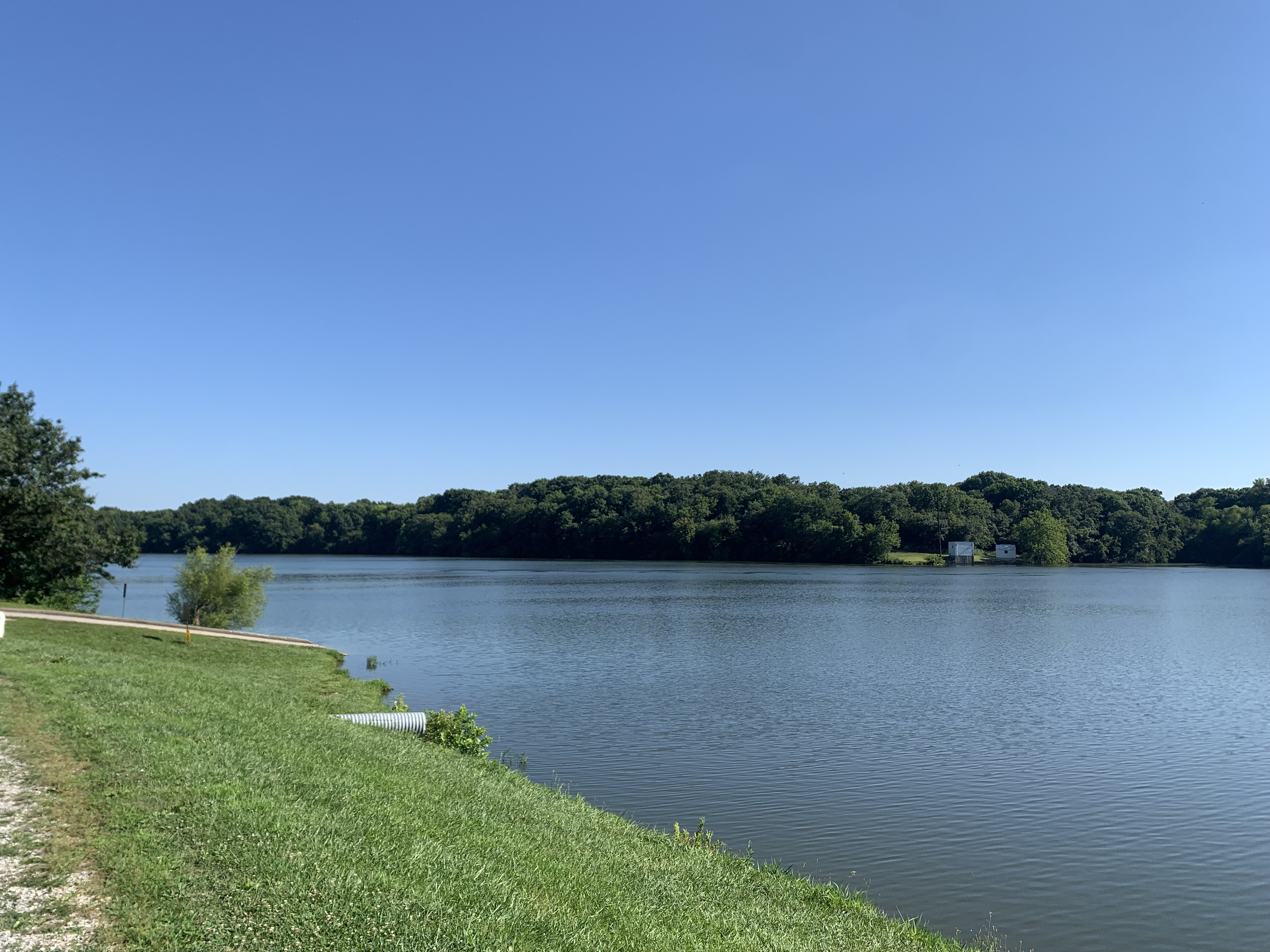
- Eagle Lake in southern Grand River Township

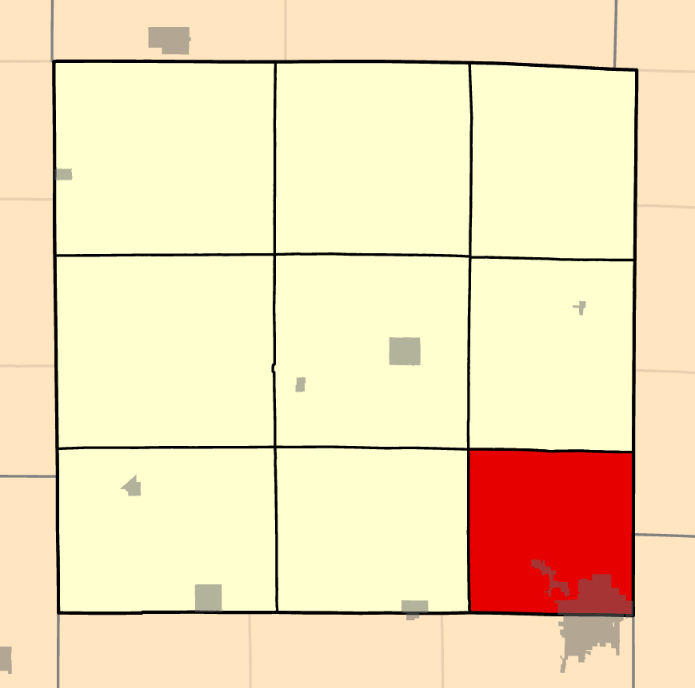
- Coordinates: 39°47′11″N 94°15′58″W
- Country: United States
- State: Missouri
- County: DeKalb

Area
  - Total: 36.17 sq mi (93.7 km^{2})
  - Land: 35.62 sq mi (92.3 km^{2})
  - Water: 0.55 sq mi (1.4 km^{2}) 1.52%
- Elevation: 994 ft (303 m)

Population (2020)
  - Total: 4,371
  - Density: 122.7/sq mi (47.4/km^{2})
- FIPS code: 29-06328288
- GNIS feature ID: 766595

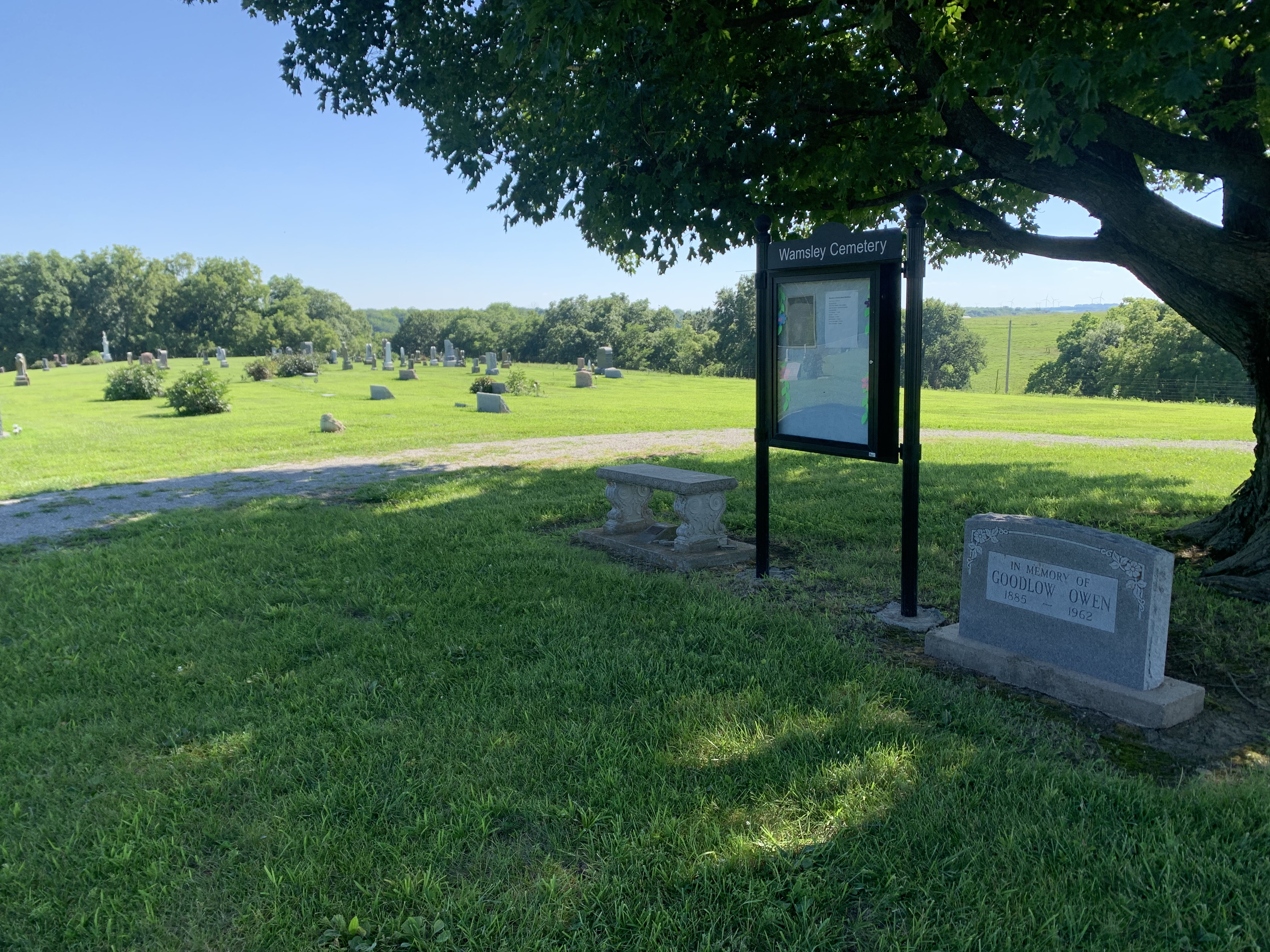
Wamsley Cemetery in Grand River Township

Grand River Township is a township in DeKalb County, Missouri, United States. At the 2020 census, its population was 4,371.

Grand River Township was established in 1845, taking its name from the Grand River.

== Transportation ==
The following highways travel through the township:

- Interstate 35
- U.S. Route 36
- U.S. Route 69
- Route 110 (Chicago–Kansas City Expressway)
- Route BB
- Route C
- Route EE
