= Grand River Township, Daviess County, Missouri =

Township in Daviess County, Missouri, U.S.

Grand River Township
- Township
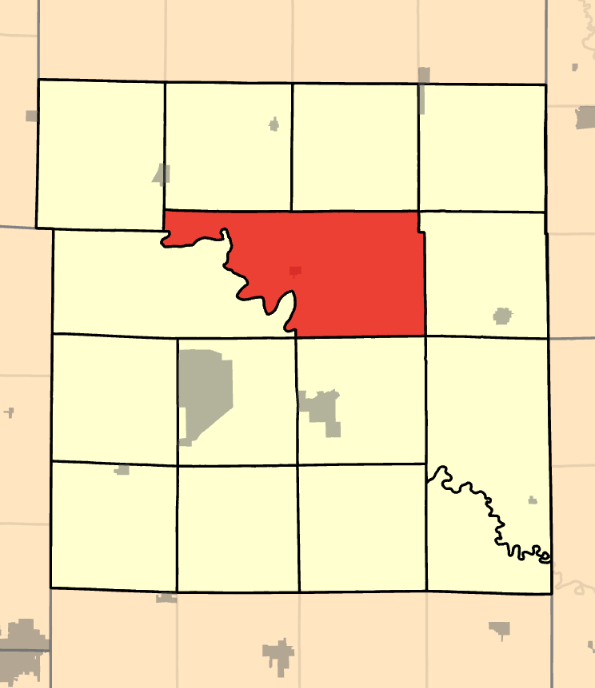
- Coordinates: 40°00′41″N 93°57′49″W
- Country: United States
- State: Missouri
- County: Daviess

Area
  - Total: 53.05 sq mi (137.4 km^{2})
  - Land: 52.55 sq mi (136.1 km^{2})
  - Water: 0.5 sq mi (1.3 km^{2}) 0.94%
- Elevation: 837 ft (255 m)

Population (2020)
  - Total: 321
  - Density: 6.1/sq mi (2.4/km^{2})
- FIPS code: 29-06128270
- GNIS feature ID: 766578

Grand River Township is a township in Daviess County, Missouri, United States. At the 2020 census, its population was 321.

Grand River Township took its name from the Grand River.
