= Grand River Township, Cass County, Missouri =

Inactive township in the US state of Missouri

Coordinates: 38.6122°N 94.3742°W

Grand River Township is an inactive township in Cass County, in the U.S. state of Missouri with a population of 11,655.

Grand River Township was established in 1872, taking its name from the Grand River.
