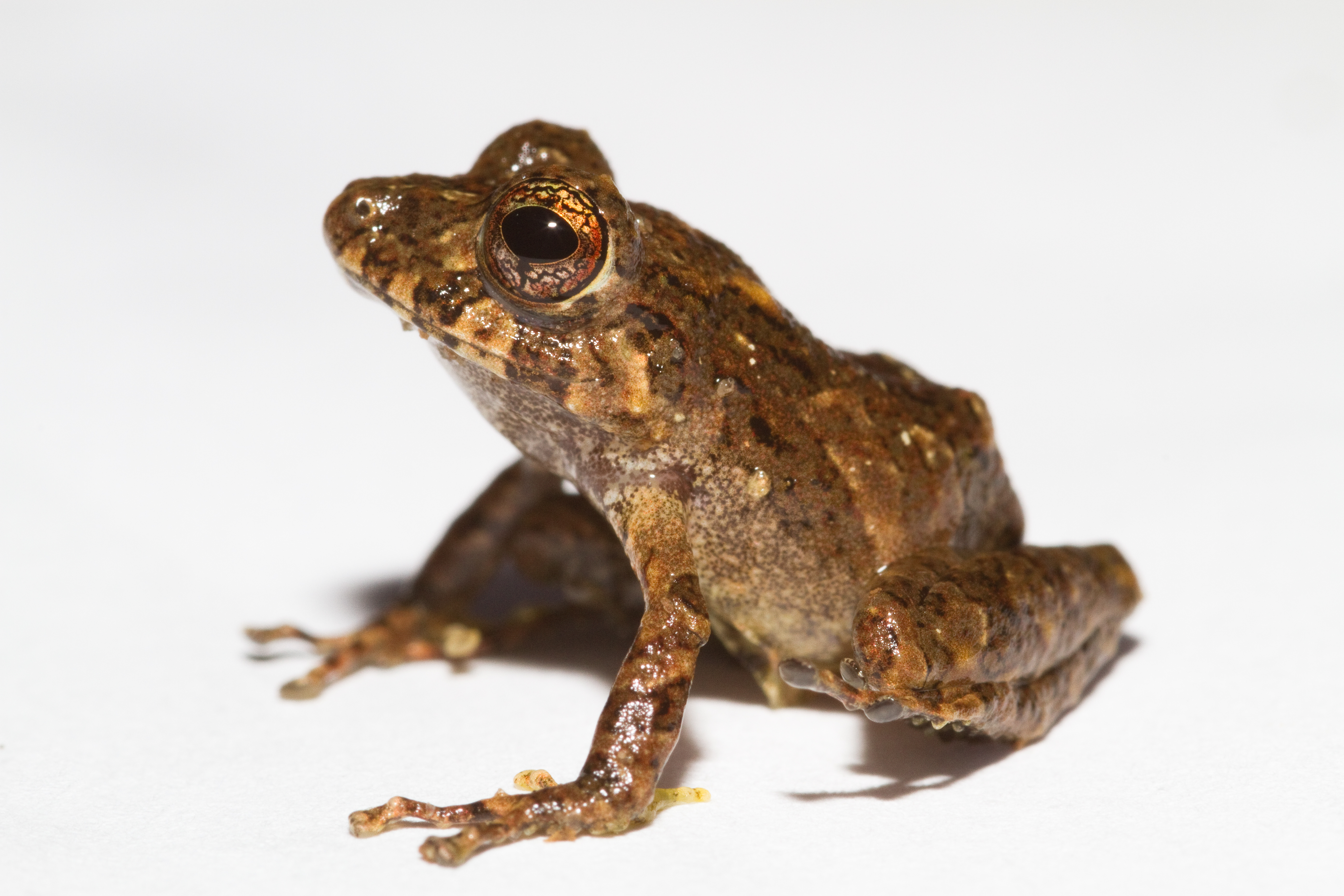

Conservation status
- Least Concern (IUCN 3.1)

Scientific classification
- Kingdom: Animalia
- Phylum: Chordata
- Class: Amphibia
- Order: Anura
- Family: Strabomantidae
- Genus: Pristimantis
- Species: P. cruentus

Binomial name
- Pristimantis cruentus (Peters, 1873)

Synonyms
- Eleutherodactylus cruentus Peters, 1873; Eleutherodactylus dubitus Taylor, 1952; Syrrhophus lutosus Barbour & Dunn, 1921

= Pristimantis cruentus =

Species of frog

Pristimantis cruentus is a species of frog in the family Strabomantidae, sometimes known as the Chiriqui robber frog. It is found in Costa Rica, Panama, and north-western Colombia. Its natural habitats are forests, including humid lowland and montane forests. It can also be found in degraded habitats outside forests. It is threatened by habitat loss.
