= Grand River Township, Madison County, Iowa =

Township in Madison County, Iowa, U.S.

Coordinates: 41.200°N 94.185°W

Grand River Township is a township in Madison County, Iowa, in the United States.

== History ==
Grand River Township was organized in 1858. Its namesake, the Grand River, its principal stream.
