= National Route 239 (Costa Rica) =

National Road Route in Costa Rica

National Secondary Route 239
- Ruta nacional secundaria 239

Route information
- Maintained by Ministry of Public Works and Transport
- Length: 87.505 km (54.373 mi)

Major junctions
- North end: Route 22 (Ciudad Colón)
- Route 209; Route 136; Route 137 (Road to Barbacoas); Route 318; Route 316; Route 314
- South end: Route 34 (Parrita)

Location
- Country: Costa Rica
- Provinces: San José, Puntarenas

Highway system
- National Road Network of Costa Rica
← Route 238	→ Route 240

National Secondary Route 239, is a road in Costa Rica between Ciudad Colón, San José province and Parrita, Puntarenas province. It is the main access road of the Puriscal canton of San José province. From Puriscal to Parrita, the road is dirt and gravel.

== Description ==
In San José province the route covers Puriscal canton (Santiago, Mercedes Sur, San Antonio, and Chires districts), Mora canton (Colón, Guayabo, Jaris, and Quitirrisí districts).

== History ==
Route 239 received major improvements in 2019, when gabion walls were constructed near Puriscal downtown to stabilize the sides of the road, similar work was done at Route 317.

On October 4, 2019, the central government announced plans to invest CRC ₡7,083,000,000 to pave with asphalt the 51.89 km gravel road between Puriscal and Parrita, due to its importance as an alternative route from the Greater Metropolitan Area to the Pacific. For forty five years, a local committee asked for this work to be done. Works will start in April 2020, with the first 10 kilometers awarded to a private contractor.

This route was severely damaged in November 2020 due to the indirect effects of Hurricane Eta.
