= Piedras Blancas (disambiguation) =

Piedras Blancas (literally, "White Stones") is a fairly common place name in the Spanish-speaking world. It may refer to:

- Piedras Blancas, a town in Asturias, Spain
- Piedras Blancas, Montevideo, a neighbourhood in Montevideo, Uruguay
- Piedras Blancas National Park in Costa Rica
- Piedras Blancas, Aguada, Puerto Rico, a barrio
- Piedras Blancas, San Sebastián, Puerto Rico, a barrio
- Pico Piedras Blancas, a mountain peak in Venezuela
- Piedras Blancas Light Station, Piedras Blancas Point, California
- Piedras Blancas State Marine Reserve and Marine Conservation Area in California

== See also ==
- Piedra Blanca, a town in the Dominican Republic
- Piedras Negras (disambiguation)
