= Quitirrisí =

District in Mora canton, San José province, Costa Rica

- District
- Quitirrisí district
- Quitirrisí district location in Costa Rica
- Coordinates: 9.8811276°N 84.2377742°W
- Country: Costa Rica
- Province: San José
- Canton: Mora
- Creation: 11 September 2014

Area
  - Total: 26.69 km^{2} (10.31 sq mi)
- Elevation: 1,140 m (3,740 ft)
- Time zone: UTC−06:00
- Postal code: 10707

Quitirrisí is the seventh district of the Mora canton, in the San José province of Costa Rica.

The district itself includes the Huetar indigenous territory of Quitirrisí. One of the touristic attractions of the district is the Rancho Biriteca, a cultural center to rescue and approach to the Huetar culture and handcrafting traditions. Handcrafted chests, hats and hammocks can be found and purchased in many indigenous-owned stores everywhere in the district.

== Toponomy ==
The name of the district comes from the indigenous territory of Quitirrisí, which in turn comes from two trees well-known in the area, Quitirrí (Lasianthaea friticosa), that blooms annually in the mountains, and Risí, equally common in local flora.

== History ==
Quitirrisí was created on 11 September 2014 by Law 9269.

The law was ratified seven days later and included the Huetar territory.

== Huetar indigenous territory ==
Huetar is one of the twenty four indigenous territories of Costa Rica, legally established through the executive order no. 6036-G of 1976 and described as an indigenous hamlet in 1979. It was separated from the Colón and Tabarcia districts.

The inhabitants speak Spanish (the Huetar language has been extinct since the seventeenth century).

Some of the indigenous people produce artisanal products such as basketry and natural dyes, but mainly they work in the city. Indigenous people own 30% on the properties in the territory.

== Geography ==
Quitirrisí has an area of 26.69 km^{2} and an elevation of 1,140 metres.

== Demography ==
Historical population
Census	Pop.	±% p.a.
2022	1,766	—
Source: Instituto Nacional de Estadística y Censos; Centro Centroamericano de Población

For the 2011 census, Quitirrisí had not been created and therefore there are no census data before 2014, but in the indigenous territory, 999 (50,84%) of the inhabitants self-identified as being of indigenous ethnicity.

== Villages ==
Villages in the area are: San Juan, San Martín, Quebrada Honda, Cañas, El Guaco.

== Transport ==
=== Road transport ===
The district is covered by the following road routes:

- National Route 209
- National Route 239
