= Asomante =

Asomante may refer to:

== Places ==
- Asomante, Aguada, Puerto Rico, a barrio
- Asomante, Aibonito, Puerto Rico, a barrio
