= Mal Paso, Aguada, Puerto Rico =

Barrio of Puerto Rico

Mal Paso Malpaso
- Barrio
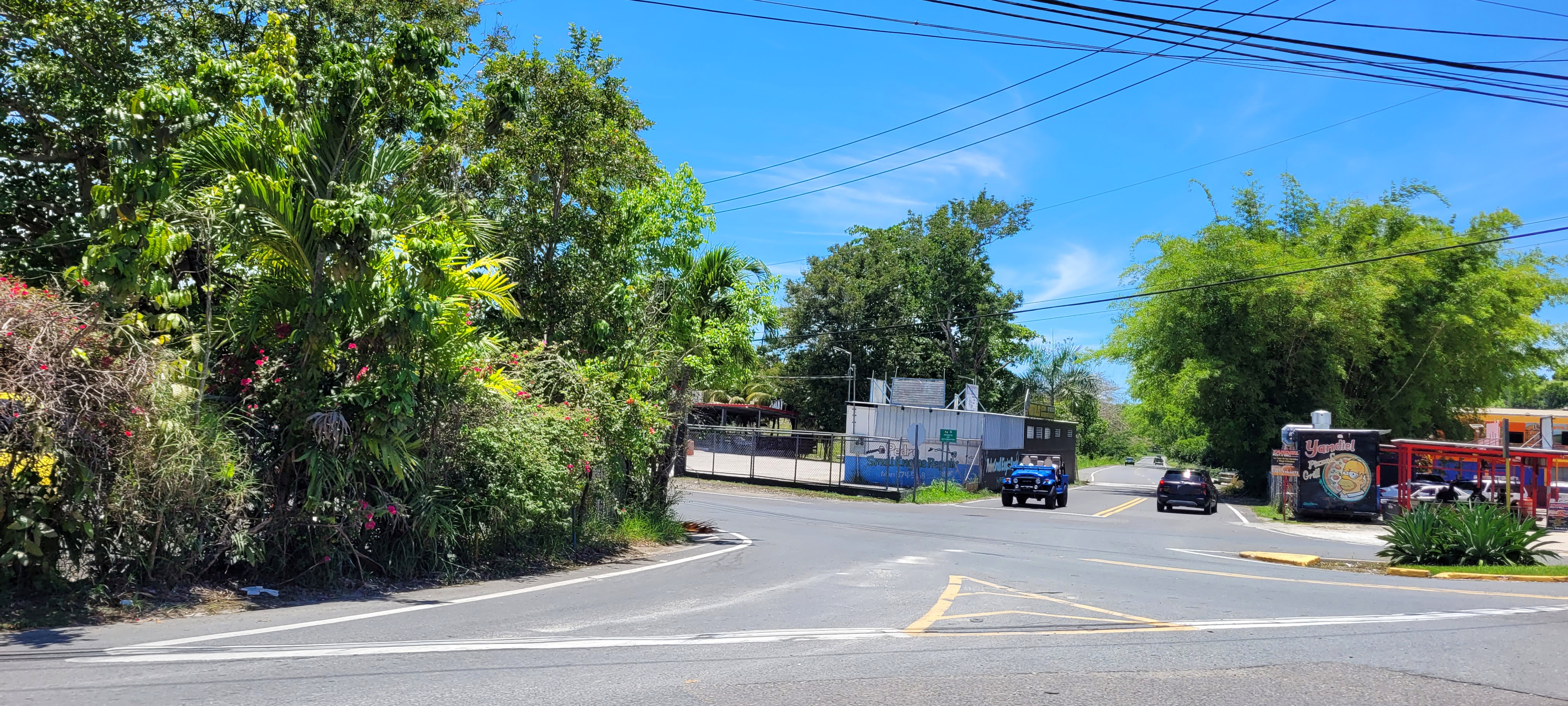
- Puerto Rico Highway 416 between Mal Paso and Piedras Blancas

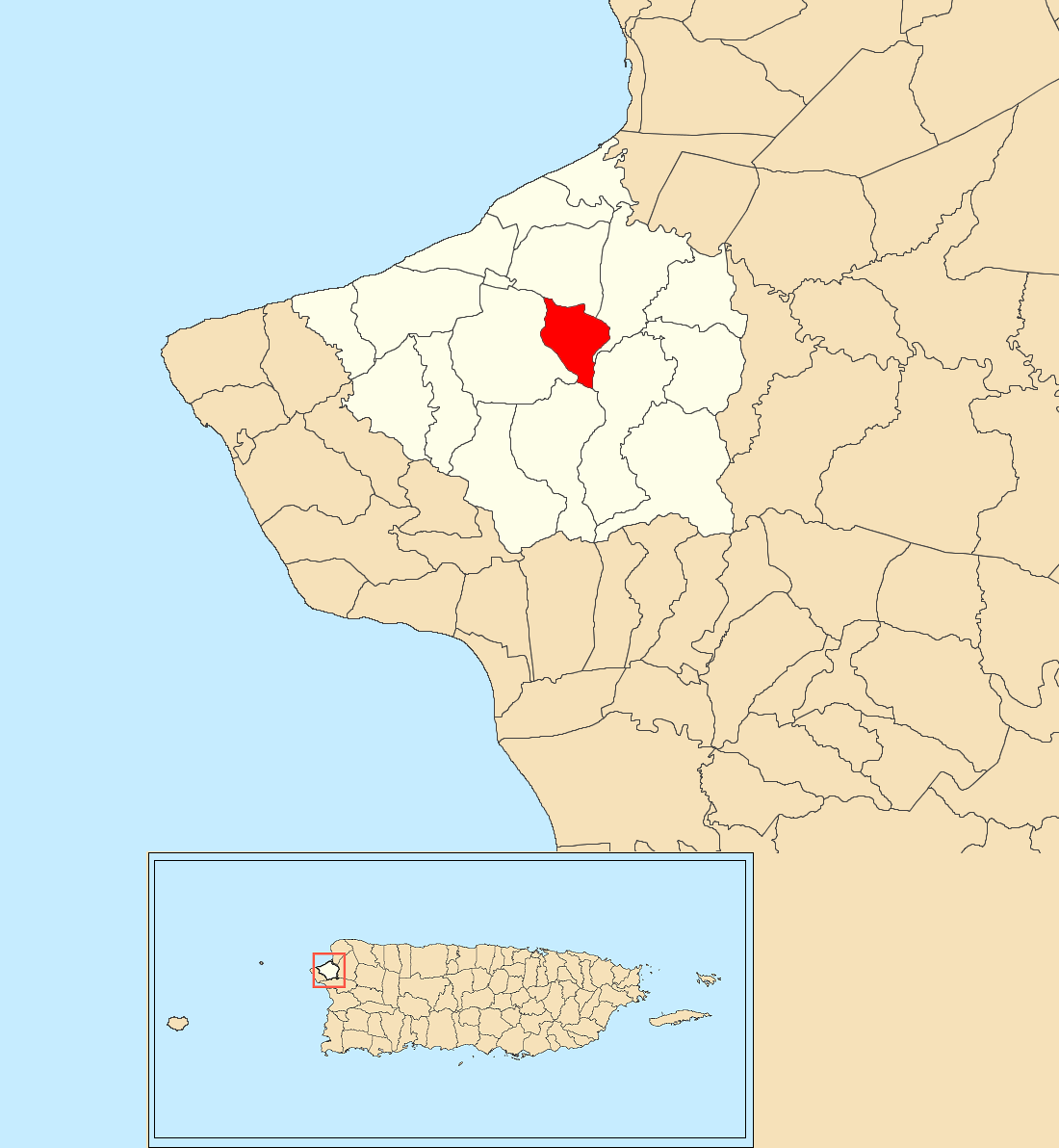
- Location of Mal Paso within the municipality of Aguada shown in red

- Location of Puerto Rico
- Coordinates: 18°21′58″N 67°10′10″W
- Commonwealth: Puerto Rico
- Municipality: Aguada

Area
  - Total: 0.93 sq mi (2.4 km^{2})
  - Land: 0.93 sq mi (2.4 km^{2})
  - Water: 0.00 sq mi (0 km^{2})
- Elevation: 135 ft (41 m)

Population (2010)
  - Total: 2,483
  - Density: 2,669.9/sq mi (1,030.9/km^{2})
- Source: 2010 Census
- Time zone: UTC−4 (AST)
- ZIP Code: 00602
- Area codes: 787, 939

Mal Paso is a barrio in the municipality of Aguada, Puerto Rico. Its population in 2010 was 2,483.

== History ==
Mal Paso was in Spain's gazetteers until Puerto Rico was ceded by Spain in the aftermath of the Spanish–American War under the terms of the Treaty of Paris of 1898 and became an unincorporated territory of the United States. In 1899, the United States Department of War conducted a census of Puerto Rico finding that the combined population of Mal Paso and Guanábano barrios (spelled Guanábanas) was 723.

Historical population
Census	Pop.	Note	%±
1910	581		—
1920	725		24.8%
1930	788		8.7%
1940	1,053		33.6%
1950	1,286		22.1%
1960	1,382		7.5%
1970	1,747		26.4%
1980	2,375		35.9%
1990	2,612		10.0%
2000	2,614		0.1%
2010	2,483		−5.0%
U.S. Decennial Census; 1900 (N/A) 1910-1930; 1930-1950 1960 1980-2000 2010

== Sectors ==
Barrios (which are, in contemporary times, roughly comparable to minor civil divisions) in turn are further subdivided into smaller local populated place areas/units called sectores (sectors in English). The types of sectores may vary, from normally sector to urbanización to reparto to barriada to residencial, among others.

The following sectors are in Mal Paso barrio:

Apartamentos Piedras Blancas, Parcelas Cornelias, Parcelas Las Minas, Sector Avilés, Sector Bucaré, Sector Cáceres, Sector César Ruíz, Sector Chevo Sánchez, Sector El Criollito, Sector Los Bimbas, Sector Militar, Sector Rosa, Sector Sabana, Sector Sony Hill, Sector Tatín Varela, Sector Vadi, Sector Villarrubia, and Urbanización Colinas Vista Azul.

In Mal Paso barrio is part of the Luyando community.

== See also ==
- List of communities in Puerto Rico
- List of barrios and sectors of Aguada, Puerto Rico
