= Santiago District, Puriscal =

District in Puriscal canton, San José province, Costa Rica

Santiago
- District
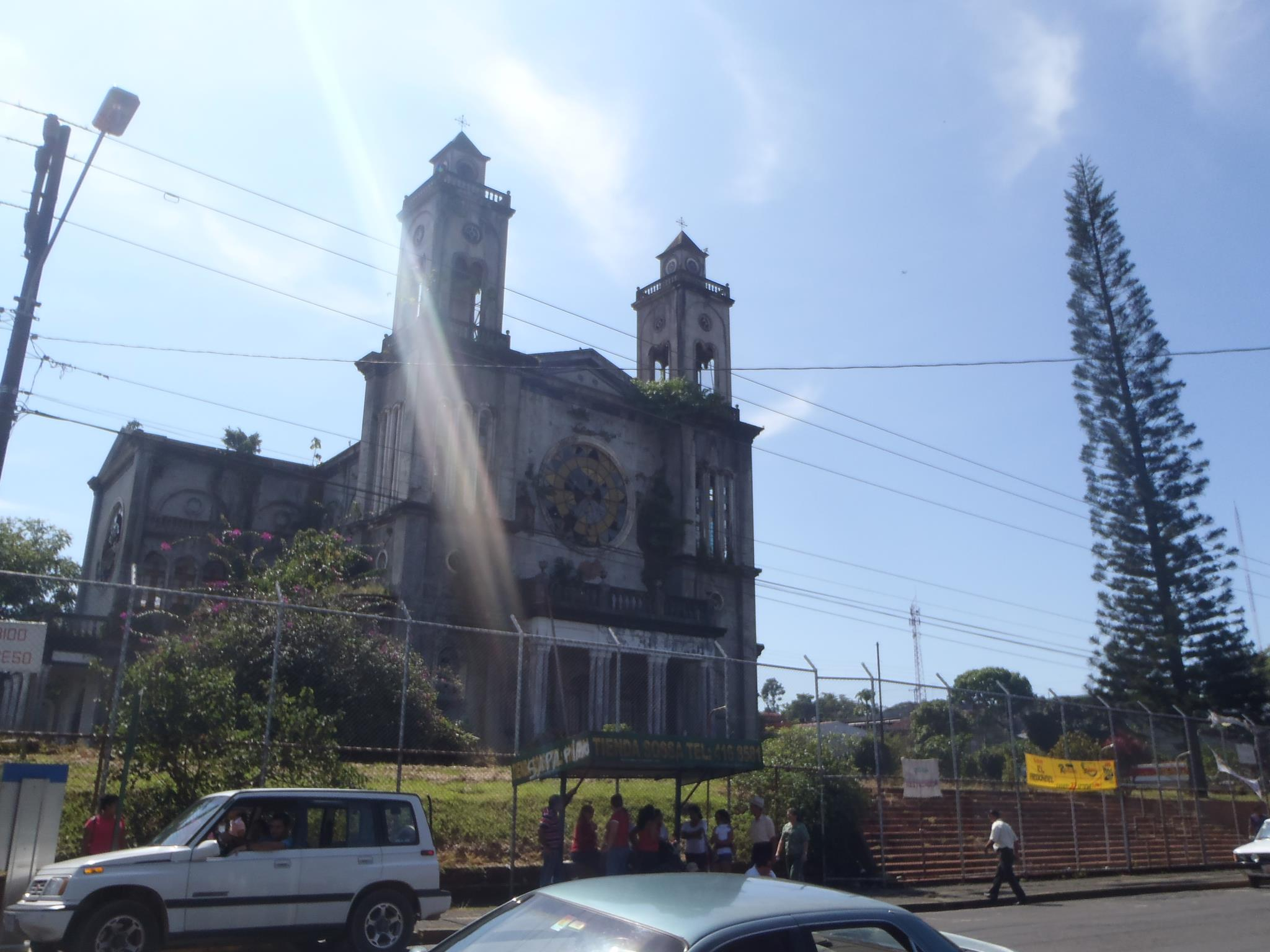
- The old cathedral
- Santiago district
- Santiago district location in Costa Rica
- Coordinates: 9.8290594°N 84.3043974°W
- Country: Costa Rica
- Province: San José
- Canton: Puriscal

Area
  - Total: 34.52 km^{2} (13.33 sq mi)
- Elevation: 1,105 m (3,625 ft)

Population (2011)
  - Total: 11,512
  - Density: 333.5/km^{2} (863.7/sq mi)
- Time zone: UTC−06:00
- Postal code: 10401

Santiago is a district and head city of the Puriscal canton, in the San José province of Costa Rica.

== History ==
The old cathedral was built by Fr. Juan Cortez de Paja who took a vow of celibacy after an Indian Princess died from Influenza that she had caught from him. On the centennial of her death an earthquake destroyed the building.

== Geography ==
Santiago has an area of 34.52 km^{2} and an elevation of 1,105 metres. It is located in the coastal mountain range, 42 km southwest of the national capital city of San José and 77 km north of the city of Parrita on the Pacific coast.

== Demographics ==
Historical population
Census	Pop.	±% p.a.
1883	821	—
1892	1,201	+4.32%
1927	2,605	+2.24%
1950	4,173	+2.07%
1963	5,633	+2.33%
1973	7,178	+2.45%
1984	7,843	+0.81%
2000	10,884	+2.07%
2011	11,512	+0.51%
2022	12,189	+0.52%
Source: Instituto Nacional de Estadística y Censos; Centro Centroamericano de Población

For the 2011 census, Santiago had a population of 11,512 inhabitants.

== Transportation ==
=== Road transportation ===
The district is covered by the following road routes:

- National Route 136
- National Route 137
- National Route 239
- National Route 314
