= Puriscal (canton) =

Canton in San José province, Costa Rica

- Canton
- Flag Seal
- Puriscal canton
- Puriscal canton location in San José Province Puriscal canton location in Costa Rica
- Coordinates: 9.7330278°N 84.3726231°W
- Country: Costa Rica
- Province: San José
- Creation: 26 June 1914
- Head city: Santiago
- Districts: Districts: Santiago; Mercedes Sur; Barbacoas; Grifo Alto; San Rafael; Candelarita; Desamparaditos; San Antonio; Chires

Government
  - Type: Municipality
  - Body: Municipalidad de Puriscal
  - Mayor: Iris Cristina Arroyo Hererra (PLN)

Area
  - Total: 555.02 km^{2} (214.29 sq mi)
- Elevation: 945 m (3,100 ft)

Population (2011)
  - Total: 33,004
  - Estimate (2022): 38,525
  - Density: 59.465/km^{2} (154.01/sq mi)
- Time zone: UTC−06:00
- Canton code: 104
- Website: puriscal.go.cr

Puriscal is the 4th canton in the province of San José, Costa Rica. The head city of the canton is Santiago.

== Toponymy ==
In Spanish, a purisco is the flower of the common bean. A puriscal is a field of flowering beans.

== History ==
Puriscal canton was established by decree on 7 August, 1868.

== Geography ==
Puriscal has an area of 555.02 km^{2} (214.29 sq mi) and a mean elevation of 945 m (3,100 ft).

Chucás River delineates the canton's northernmost boundary, while the Chires River marks its far southern border, with the canton of Parrita in Puntarenas Province. Puriscal includes a significant portion of the Coastal Mountain Range. However, the canton is landlocked.

== Government ==
=== Mayor ===
According to Costa Rica's Municipal Code, mayors are elected every four years by the population of the canton. As of the latest municipal elections in 2024, the National Liberation Party candidate, Iris Cristina Arroyo Herrera, was elected mayor of the canton with 60.39% of the votes, with Miguel Ángel Mata Zúñiga and David Alonso Carrera Herrera as first and second vice mayors, respectively.

Mayors of Puriscal since the 2002 elections
Period	Name	Party
2002–2006	Carlos Araya Jiménez	PLN
2006–2010	Jorge Luis Chaves Gutiérrez	PLN
2010–2016	Manuel Espinoza Campos	PLN
2016–2020	Luis Madrigal Hidalgo	PUSC
2020–2024	Iris Cristina Arroyo Herrera	PLN
2024–2028	Iris Cristina Arroyo Herrera	PLN

=== Municipal Council ===
Like the mayor and vice mayors, members of the Municipal Council (called regidores) are elected every four years. Puriscal's Municipal Council has 7 seats for regidores and their substitutes, who can participate in meetings but not vote unless the owning regidor (regidor propietario) is absent. The Municipal Council's composition for the 2024–2028 period is as follows:

Current composition of the Municipal Council of Puriscal after the 2024 municipal elections
Political parties in the Municipal Council of Puriscal
Political party	Regidores		
Political party	№	Owner	Substitute
National Liberation Party (PLN)	3	Santiago Castro Fallas	Giovanni Mora Rodríguez
National Liberation Party (PLN)	3	Mireya Mora Jiménez	Mariangel Mora Herrera
National Liberation Party (PLN)	3	José Pablo Fernández Soto	Mario Chacón Rubí
Puriscal on the Move (PM)	1	Orlando Fernández Fernández	Michael Hernán Fernández Guerrero
Social Christian Unity Party (PUSC)	1	Gloriana Bermúdez Durán	Priscilla Vanessa Aguilar Jiménez

== Demographics ==
Historical population
Census	Pop.	±% p.a.
1883	1,942	—
1892	6,845	+15.02%
1927	13,329	+1.92%
1950	16,743	+1.00%
1963	23,690	+2.71%
1973	24,150	+0.19%
1984	23,123	−0.39%
2000	29,407	+1.51%
2011	33,004	+1.05%
2022	38,525	+1.42%
Source: Instituto Nacional de Estadística y Censos; Centro Centroamericano de Población

Puriscal had an estimated population of 38,525 people in 2022, up from 33,004 at the time of the 2011 census.

Puriscal had a Human Development Index of 0.755 in 2022. Its Multidimensional Poverty Index in 2023 was 0.072.

Only 18% of the canton's population live in urban areas. Among its inhabitants, 20.2% are under ten, and 7.4% are over 65.

== Districts ==
The canton of Puriscal is subdivided into the following districts:

1. Santiago
2. Mercedes Sur
3. Barbacoas
4. Grifo Alto
5. San Rafael
6. Candelarita
7. Desamparaditos
8. San Antonio
9. Chires

== Transportation ==
=== Road transportation ===
The following road routes cover the canton:

- National Route 136
- National Route 137
- National Route 239
- National Route 314
- National Route 316
- National Route 317
- National Route 318
- National Route 319
- National Route 324
