= National Route 609 (Costa Rica) =

Road in Costa Rica

National Tertiary Route 609
- Ruta nacional terciaria 609

Route information
- Maintained by Ministry of Public Works and Transport
- Length: 13.870 km (8.618 mi)

Major junctions
- North end: Route 318 (Vasconia)
- South end: Route 34 (Playón Sur)

Location
- Country: Costa Rica

Highway system
- National Road Network of Costa Rica
← Route 608	→ Route 610

National Tertiary Route 609, or just Route 609 (Spanish: Ruta Nacional Terciaria 609, or Ruta 609) is a National Road Route of Costa Rica, located in the Puntarenas province. It is the road between Route 318 in Vasconia, Parrita and Route 34 in Playón Sur, also in Parrita, in the Puntarenas province of Costa Rica.

== Description ==
In Puntarenas province the route covers Parrita canton (Parrita district).

== History ==
This road allows the farmers of papaya, watermelon, rice, and African oil palm to export their products. An asphalt paving project for 14 kilometers started in October 2019 and finished in May 2020 at a cost of CRC ₡ 945 million.
