= Chires =

District in San José province, Costa Rica

- District
- Interactive map of Chires
- Chires district location in Costa Rica
- Coordinates: 9.652831°N 84.3932434°W
- Country: Costa Rica
- Province: San José
- Canton: Puriscal
- Creation: 3 November 1983

Area
  - Total: 230.47 km^{2} (88.98 sq mi)
- Elevation: 430 m (1,410 ft)

Population (2011)
  - Total: 3,031
  - Density: 13.15/km^{2} (34.06/sq mi)
- Time zone: UTC−06:00
- Postal code: 10409

Chires is a district of the Puriscal canton, in the San José province of Costa Rica.

== History ==
Chires was created on 3 November 1983 by Acuerdo 230. Segregated from Mercedes Sur.

== Geography ==
Chires has an area of 230.47 km^{2} and an elevation of 430 metres.

== Demographics ==
Historical population
Census	Pop.	±% p.a.
1984	3,246	—
2000	2,806	−0.91%
2011	3,031	+0.70%
2022	3,022	−0.03%
Source: Instituto Nacional de Estadística y Censos; Centro Centroamericano de Población

For the 2011 census, Chires had a population of 3,031 inhabitants.

== Transportation ==
=== Road transportation ===
The district is covered by the following road routes:

- National Route 239
- National Route 318
- National Route 319
