= Guayabo District =

District in Mora canton, San José province, Costa Rica

Guayabo
- District
- Interactive map of Guayabo
- Guayabo district location in Costa Rica
- Coordinates: 9.8605933°N 84.2673109°W
- Country: Costa Rica
- Province: San José
- Canton: Mora

Area
  - Total: 8.99 km^{2} (3.47 sq mi)
- Elevation: 996 m (3,268 ft)

Population (2011)
  - Total: 4,449
  - Density: 495/km^{2} (1,280/sq mi)
- Time zone: UTC−06:00
- Postal code: 10702

Guayabo is a district of the Mora canton, in the San José province of Costa Rica.

== Geography ==
Guayabo has an area of 8.99 km^{2} and an elevation of 996 metres.

== Demographics ==
Historical population
Census	Pop.	±% p.a.
1883	300	—
1927	1,002	+2.78%
1950	1,106	+0.43%
1963	1,135	+0.20%
1973	1,288	+1.27%
1984	1,612	+2.06%
2000	3,215	+4.41%
2011	4,449	+3.00%
2022	5,292	+1.59%
Source: Instituto Nacional de Estadística y Censos; Centro Centroamericano de Población

For the 2011 census, Guayabo had a population of 4,449 inhabitants.

== Transportation ==
=== Road transportation ===
The district is covered by the following road routes:

- National Route 209
- National Route 239
