= Cerro Gordo, Aguada, Puerto Rico =

Barrio of Puerto Rico

Cerro Gordo
- Barrio
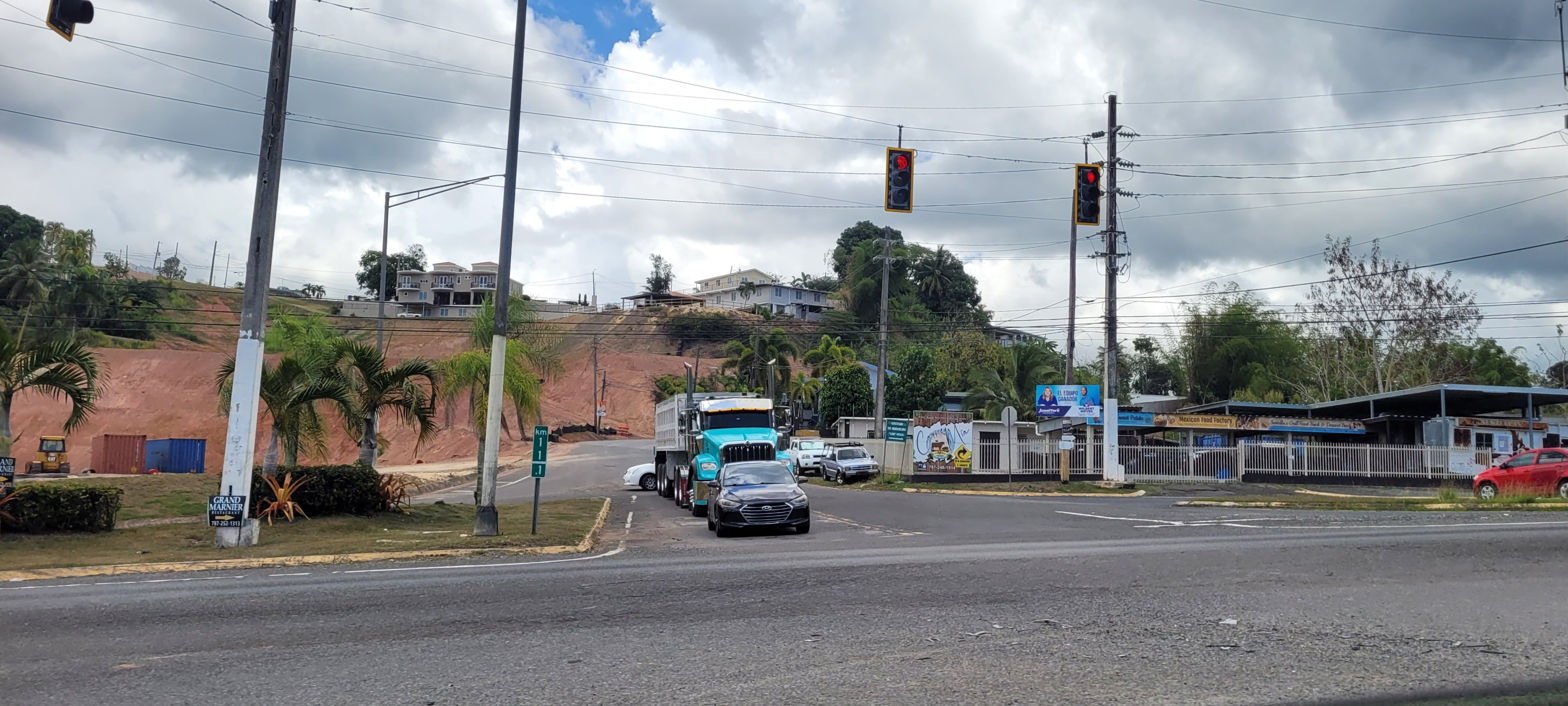
- Puerto Rico Highway 419 in Cerro Gordo

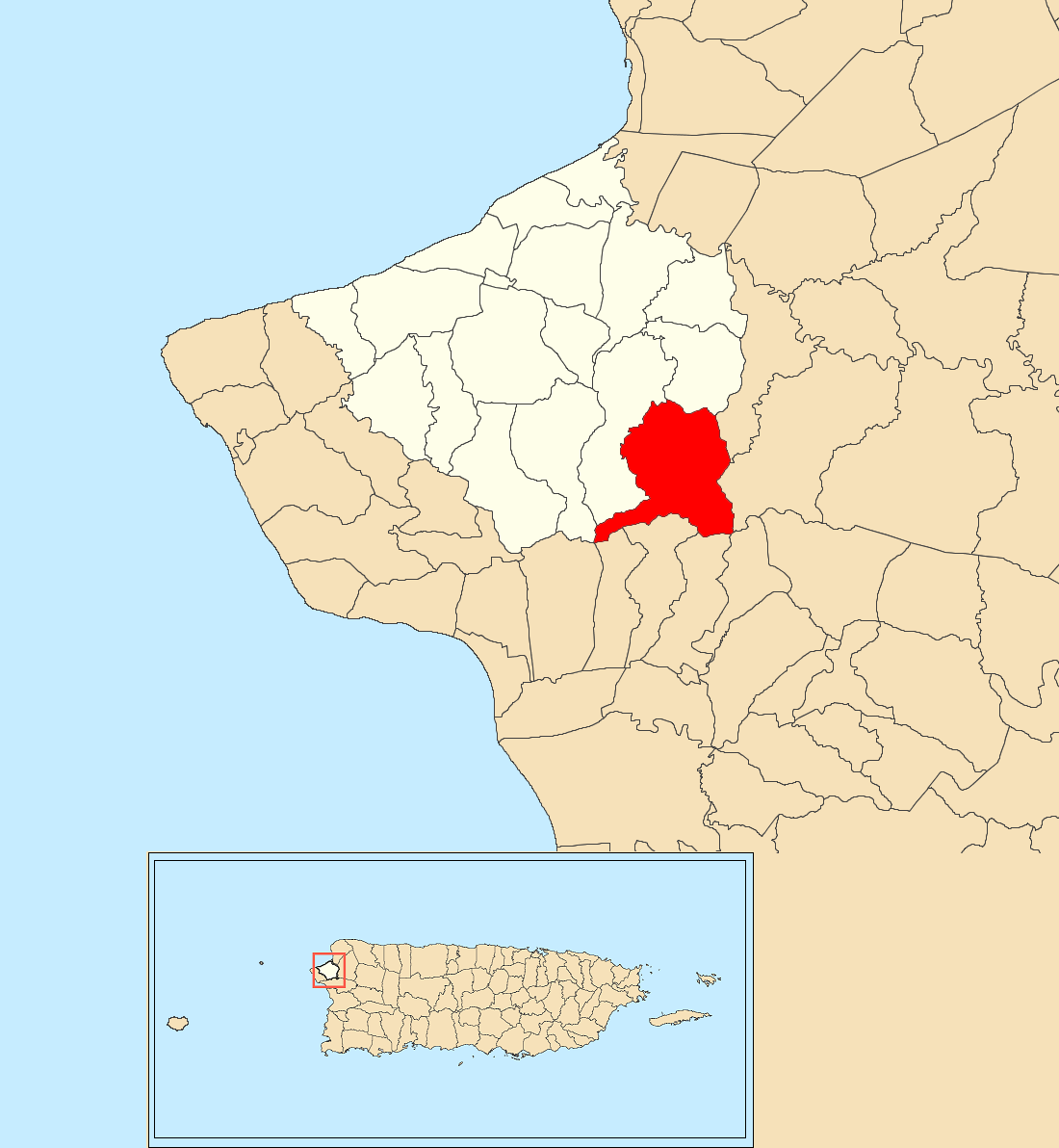
- Location of Cerro Gordo within the municipality of Aguada shown in red

- Location of Puerto Rico
- Coordinates: 18°19′42″N 67°08′33″W
- Commonwealth: Puerto Rico
- Municipality: Aguada

Area
  - Total: 3.07 sq mi (8.0 km^{2})
  - Land: 3.07 sq mi (8.0 km^{2})
  - Water: 0.00 sq mi (0 km^{2})
- Elevation: 659 ft (201 m)

Population (2010)
  - Total: 3,018
  - Density: 983.1/sq mi (379.6/km^{2})
- Source: 2010 Census
- Time zone: UTC−4 (AST)
- ZIP Code: 00602
- Area codes: 787, 939

Cerro Gordo is a barrio in the municipality of Aguada, Puerto Rico. Its population in 2010 was 3,018.

== History ==
Cerro Gordo was in Spain's gazetteers until Puerto Rico was ceded by Spain in the aftermath of the Spanish–American War under the terms of the Treaty of Paris of 1898 and became an unincorporated territory of the United States. In 1899, the United States Department of War conducted a census of Puerto Rico finding that the population of Cerro Gordo was 843.

Historical population
Census	Pop.	Note	%±
1900	843		—
1910	934		10.8%
1920	993		6.3%
1930	1,143		15.1%
1940	1,487		30.1%
1950	1,414		−4.9%
1970	1,782		—
1980	2,201		23.5%
1990	2,183		−0.8%
2000	2,930		34.2%
2010	3,018		3.0%
U.S. Decennial Census; 1899 (shown as 1900) 1910-1930; 1930-1950 1960 1980-2000 2010

== Sectors ==
Barrios (which are, in contemporary times, roughly comparable to minor civil divisions) in turn are further subdivided into smaller local populated place areas/units called sectores (sectors in English). The types of sectores may vary, from normally sector to urbanización to reparto to barriada to residencial, among others.

The following neighborhoods are in Cerro Gordo barrio:

Comunidad Aislada, Hogar La Igualdad Inc., Sector Claudio Miranda, Sector Concho Pérez, Sector David Acevedo, Sector Gabino Negrón, Sector García, Sector Gil Feliciano, Sector Hotel Paraíso, Sector Ito López, Sector Juan Ramírez, Sector La Cadena, Sector La Ceiba, Sector Lolo Pepe, Sector Marcelino “Lin” Vega, Sector Marcos Rojas, Sector Mariano Concepción, Sector Morales, Sector Nino López, Sector Patricio Vega, Sector Quebrada Larga, and Tramo Carretera 110.

== Earthquakes ==
During the 2019-2020 Puerto Rico earthquakes the Lydia Meléndez School in Asomante barrio served as a refuge for residents, from Cerro Gordo, Las Marías and Atalaya barrios, who had to leave their damaged homes.

== See also ==
- List of communities in Puerto Rico
- List of barrios and sectors of Aguada, Puerto Rico
