= Mora (canton) =

Canton in San José province, Costa Rica

- Canton
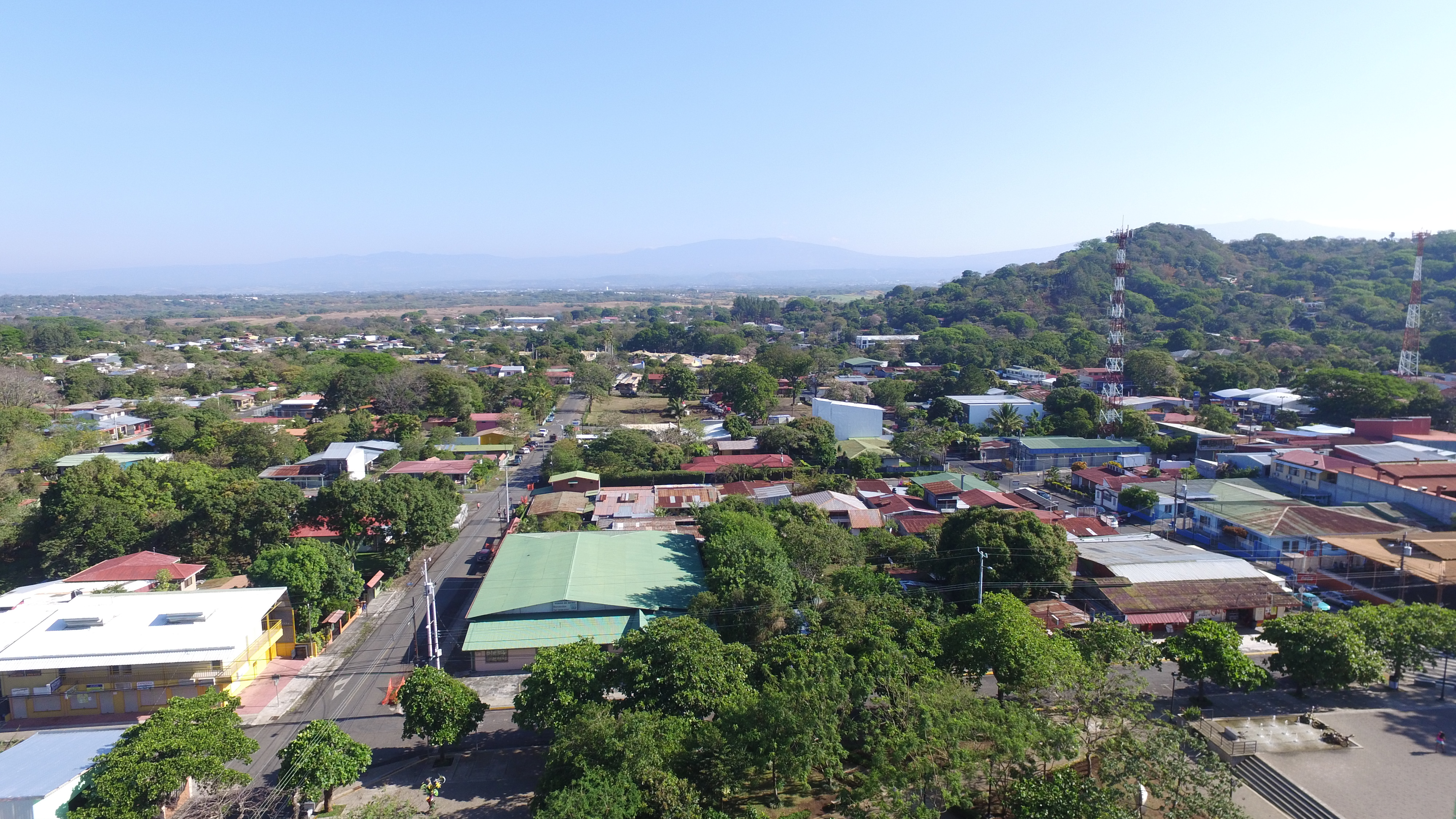
- Ciudad Colón, aerial view

- Flag Seal
- Mora canton
- Mora canton location in San José Province Mora canton location in Costa Rica
- Coordinates: 9.8724731°N 84.2801252°W
- Country: Costa Rica
- Province: San José
- Creation: 25 May 1883
- Head city: Colón
- Districts: Districts: Colón; Guayabo; Tabarcia; Piedras Negras; Picagres; Jaris; Quitirrisí

Government
  - Type: Municipality
  - Body: Municipalidad de Mora
  - Mayor: Rodrigo Alfonso Jiménez Cascante (PLP)

Area
  - Total: 163.47 km^{2} (63.12 sq mi)
- Elevation: 807 m (2,648 ft)

Population (2011)
  - Total: 26,294
  - Estimate (2022): 32,348
  - Density: 160.85/km^{2} (416.60/sq mi)
- Time zone: UTC−06:00
- Canton code: 107
- Website: mora.go.cr

Mora is the seventh canton in the San José province of Costa Rica. Its head city is Colón.

== Toponymy ==
Originally designated as Pacaca, a cacique name, the canton's name was changed to Mora in honor of Juan Rafael Mora Porras (1814-1860), the second President of Costa Rica.

== History ==
The canton of Pacaca was established by a decree of 25 May 1883.

== Government ==
=== Mayor ===
According to Costa Rica's Municipal Code, mayors are elected every four years by the population of the canton. As of the latest municipal elections in 2024, the Progressive Liberal Party candidate, Rodrigo Alfonso Jiménez Cascante, was elected mayor of the canton with 44.73% of the votes, with Ariun Zaya Cabal Lombodorzh (Note: Also legally named Ariuna Zaya Cabal Lombodorzh.) and Maynor Guevara Mora as first and second vice mayors, respectively.

Mayors of Mora since the 2002 elections
Period	Name	Party
2002–2006	Alcides Ovidio Araya Campos	PLN
2006–2010	Gilberto Monge Pizarro	PLN
2010–2016	Gilberto Monge Pizarro	PLN
2016–2020	Gilberto Monge Pizarro	PNG
2020–2024	Rodrigo Alfonso Jiménez Cascante	PNG
2024–2028	Rodrigo Alfonso Jiménez Cascante	PLP

=== Municipal Council ===
Like the mayor and vice mayors, members of the Municipal Council (called regidores) are elected every four years. Mora's Municipal Council has 5 seats for regidores and their substitutes, who can participate in meetings but not vote unless the owning regidor (regidor propietario) is absent. The current president of the Municipal Council is the United For Development Party member María Picado Ovares. The Municipal Council's composition for the 2024–2028 period is as follows:

Current composition of the Municipal Council of Mora after the 2024 municipal elections
Political parties in the Municipal Council of Mora
Political party	Regidores		
Political party	№	Owner	Substitute
Progressive Liberal Party (PLP)	2	Joarline de los Ángeles Mata Mata	Marianeth de los Ángeles Zamora Acuña
Progressive Liberal Party (PLP)	2	José Antonio Varela Monge	Mario Gerardo Villalobos Ramírez
United For Development Party (PUEDE)	2	María Picado Ovares^{(P)}	Rose Mary Sánchez Pérez
United For Development Party (PUEDE)	2	Emmanuel Ferrer Venegas	Juan Gabriel Vásquez Solís
National Liberation Party (PLN)	1	Xinia María Vargas Vargas	Alexa Silva Varela

== Geography ==
Mora has an area of 163.47 km^{2} (63.12 sq mi) and a mean elevation of 807 m (2,648 ft).

The Virilla River establishes the northern boundary of the canton, with the Grande de Tárcoles River delineating its far western limit. The Chucás, Quebrada Grande, Viejo and Tabarcia rivers mark the canton's western boundary; the Jorco, Tabarcia and Negro rivers, the southern boundary; and a series of foothills rising into the Cerros de Escazú delineate the canton's eastern border.

== Districts ==
The canton of Mora is subdivided into seven districts:

1. Colón
2. Guayabo
3. Tabarcia
4. Piedras Negras
5. Picagres
6. Jaris
7. Quitirrisí

== Demographics ==
Historical population
Census	Pop.	±% p.a.
1883	6,976	—
1892	5,814	−2.00%
1927	7,925	+0.89%
1950	7,736	−0.10%
1963	8,938	+1.12%
1973	10,733	+1.85%
1984	12,584	+1.46%
2000	21,666	+3.45%
2011	26,294	+1.78%
2022	32,348	+1.90%
Source: Instituto Nacional de Estadística y Censos; Centro Centroamericano de Población

Mora had an estimated population of 32,348 people in 2022, up from 26,294 at the time of 2011 census.

Mora had a Human Development Index of 0.801 in 2022.

== Transportation ==
=== Road transportation ===
The canton is covered by the following road routes:

- National Route 22
- National Route 121
- National Route 136
- National Route 209
- National Route 239
- National Route 316
