= Marías, Aguada, Puerto Rico =

Barrio of Puerto Rico

Marías
- Barrio
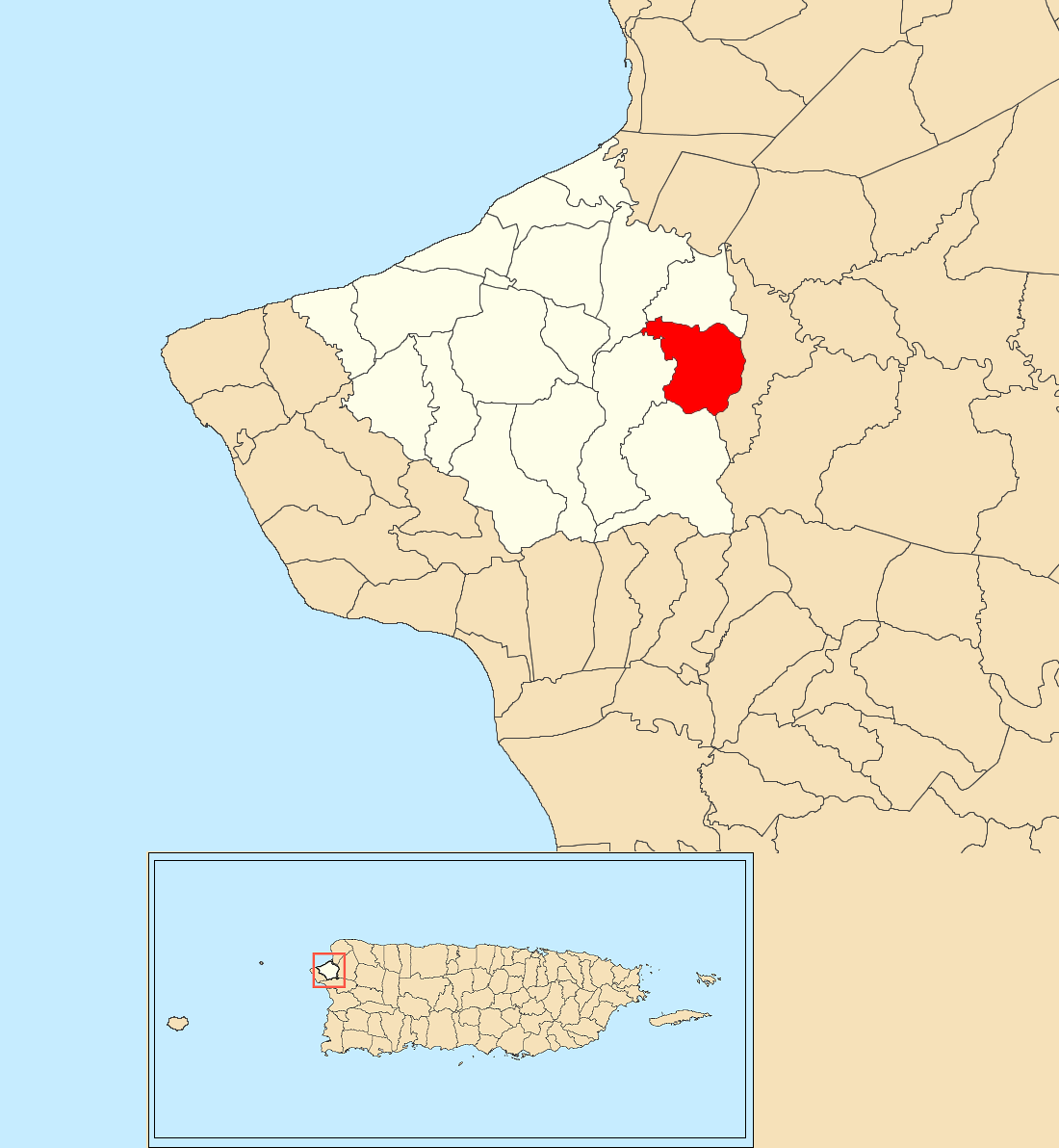
- Location of Marías within the municipality of Aguada shown in red

- Location of Puerto Rico
- Coordinates: 18°21′34″N 67°08′18″W
- Commonwealth: Puerto Rico
- Municipality: Aguada

Area
  - Total: 1.71 sq mi (4.4 km^{2})
  - Land: 1.71 sq mi (4.4 km^{2})
  - Water: 0.00 sq mi (0 km^{2})
- Elevation: 285 ft (87 m)

Population (2010)
  - Total: 1,997
  - Density: 1,167.8/sq mi (450.9/km^{2})
- Source: 2010 Census
- Time zone: UTC−4 (AST)
- ZIP Code: 00602
- Area codes: 787, 939

Marías is a barrio in the municipality of Aguada, Puerto Rico. Its population in 2010 was 1,997.

== History ==
Marías was in Spain's gazetteers until Puerto Rico was ceded by Spain in the aftermath of the Spanish–American War under the terms of the Treaty of Paris of 1898 and became an unincorporated territory of the United States. In 1899, the United States Department of War conducted a census of Puerto Rico finding that the population of Marías barrio was 746.

Historical population
Census	Pop.	Note	%±
1900	746		—
1910	872		16.9%
1920	995		14.1%
1930	995		0.0%
1940	1,080		8.5%
1950	872		−19.3%
1960	1,175		34.7%
1970	1,149		−2.2%
1980	1,264		10.0%
1990	1,821		44.1%
2000	1,786		−1.9%
2010	1,997		11.8%
U.S. Decennial Census; 1899 (shown as 1900) 1910-1930; 1930-1950 1960 1980-2000 2010

== Sectors ==
Barrios (which are, in contemporary times, roughly comparable to minor civil divisions) in turn are further subdivided into smaller local populated place areas/units called sectores ("sectors" in English). The types of sectores may vary, from normally sector to urbanización to reparto to barriada to residencial, among others.

The following sectors are in Marías barrio:

Sector Botti, Sector Delfín Cortés, Sector Eloy Villanueva, Sector Gabino López, Sector Hoyo Frío, Sector Julio Nieves, Sector La Viuda Negrón, Sector Las Bambúas, Sector Lelo Villanueva, Sector Los Ratones, Sector Pablo López, Sector Pedro López, and Sector Wilson Hernández.

== Earthquakes ==
During the 2019-2020 Puerto Rico earthquakes the Lydia Meléndez School in Asomante barrio served as a refuge for residents of Cerro Gordo, Marías and Atalaya (nearby barrios), who had to leave their damaged homes.

== See also ==
- List of communities in Puerto Rico
- List of barrios and sectors of Aguada, Puerto Rico
