= Grifo Alto =

District in Puriscal canton, San José province, Costa Rica

- District
- Interactive map of Grifo Alto
- Grifo Alto district location in Costa Rica
- Coordinates: 9.877816°N 84.3926272°W
- Country: Costa Rica
- Province: San José
- Canton: Puriscal

Area
  - Total: 26.21 km^{2} (10.12 sq mi)
- Elevation: 1,021 m (3,350 ft)

Population (2011)
  - Total: 1,182
  - Density: 45.10/km^{2} (116.8/sq mi)
- Time zone: UTC−06:00
- Postal code: 10404

Grifo Alto is a district of the Puriscal canton, in the San José province of Costa Rica.

== Geography ==
Grifo Alto has an area of 26.21 km^{2} and an elevation of 1,021 metres.

== Demographics ==
Historical population
Census	Pop.	±% p.a.
1883	241	—
1892	428	+6.59%
1927	1,737	+4.08%
1950	1,416	−0.88%
1963	1,323	−0.52%
1973	1,249	−0.57%
1984	916	−2.78%
2000	1,101	+1.16%
2011	1,182	+0.65%
2022	1,570	+2.61%
Source: Instituto Nacional de Estadística y Censos; Centro Centroamericano de Población

For the 2011 census, Grifo Alto had a population of 1,182 inhabitants.

== Transportation ==
=== Road transportation ===
The district is covered by the following road routes:

- National Route 137
