= Candelarita =

District in Puriscal canton, San José province, Costa Rica

- District
- Interactive map of Candelarita
- Candelarita district location in Costa Rica
- Coordinates: 9.7882156°N 84.3369487°W
- Country: Costa Rica
- Province: San José
- Canton: Puriscal

Area
  - Total: 24.87 km^{2} (9.60 sq mi)
- Elevation: 980 m (3,220 ft)

Population (2011)
  - Total: 1,436
  - Density: 57.74/km^{2} (149.5/sq mi)
- Time zone: UTC−06:00
- Postal code: 10406

Candelarita is a district of the Puriscal canton, in the San José province of Costa Rica.

== Geography ==
Candelarita has an area of 24.87 km^{2} (9.60 sq mi) and an elevation of 980 metres (3,220 ft).

== Demographics ==
Historical population
Census	Pop.	±% p.a.
1883	331	—
1892	719	+9.00%
1927	821	+0.38%
1950	1,012	+0.91%
1963	1,357	+2.28%
1973	1,198	−1.24%
1984	1,333	+0.98%
2000	1,425	+0.42%
2011	1,436	+0.07%
2022	1,613	+1.06%
Source: Instituto Nacional de Estadística y Censos; Centro Centroamericano de Población

For the 2011 census, Candelarita had a population of 1,436 inhabitants.

== Transportation ==
=== Road transportation ===
The district is covered by the following road routes:

- National Route 317
