= San Antonio District, Puriscal =

District in Puriscal canton, San José province, Costa Rica

San Antonio
- District
- San Antonio district
- San Antonio district location in Costa Rica
- Coordinates: 9.861506°N 84.2990593°W
- Country: Costa Rica
- Province: San José
- Canton: Puriscal

Area
  - Total: 14.5 km^{2} (5.6 sq mi)
- Elevation: 1,090 m (3,580 ft)

Population (2011)
  - Total: 3,889
  - Density: 268/km^{2} (695/sq mi)
- Time zone: UTC−06:00
- Postal code: 10408

San Antonio is a district of the Puriscal canton, in the San José province of Costa Rica.

== Geography ==
San Antonio has an area of 14.5 km^{2} and an elevation of 1,090 metres.

== Demographics ==
Historical population
Census	Pop.	±% p.a.
1883	553	—
1892	598	+0.87%
1950	731	+0.35%
1963	935	+1.91%
1973	943	+0.09%
1984	1,894	+6.55%
2000	2,803	+2.48%
2011	3,889	+3.02%
2022	4,908	+2.14%
Source: Instituto Nacional de Estadística y Censos; Centro Centroamericano de Población

For the 2011 census, San Antonio had a population of 3,889 inhabitants.

== Transportation ==
=== Road transportation ===
The district is covered by the following road routes:

- National Route 239
- National Route 316
