= Jaris =

District in Mora canton, San José province, Costa Rica

- District
- Interactive map of Jaris
- Jaris district location in Costa Rica
- Coordinates: 9.8743954°N 84.2818496°W
- Country: Costa Rica
- Province: San José
- Canton: Mora
- Creation: 18 May 2012

Area
  - Total: 5.53 km^{2} (2.14 sq mi)
- Elevation: 830 m (2,720 ft)
- Time zone: UTC−06:00
- Postal code: 10706

Jaris is a district of the Mora canton, in the San José province of Costa Rica.

== History ==
Jaris was created on 18 May 2012 by Acuerdo Ejecutivo N° 0015-2012-MGP.

== Geography ==
Jaris has an area of 5.53 km^{2} and an elevation of 830 metres.

== Demographics ==
Historical population
Census	Pop.	±% p.a.
1883	166	—
2022	1,456	+1.57%
Source: Instituto Nacional de Estadística y Censos; Centro Centroamericano de Población

For the 2011 census, Jaris had not been created as a district, there are however historic references in the censuses of 1883 (166 inhabitants) and 1892 (as Guayabo and Jaris with 868 inhabitants) to the village that would later become the socioeconomic center of the district in 2012.

== Transportation ==
=== Road transportation ===
The district is covered by the following road routes:

- National Route 209
- National Route 239
