= San Rafael District, Puriscal =

District in Puriscal canton, San José province, Costa Rica

San Rafael
- District
- San Rafael district
- San Rafael district location in Costa Rica
- Coordinates: 9.8252894°N 84.2784565°W
- Country: Costa Rica
- Province: San José
- Canton: Puriscal

Area
  - Total: 15.53 km^{2} (6.00 sq mi)
- Elevation: 825 m (2,707 ft)

Population (2011)
  - Total: 1,730
  - Density: 111/km^{2} (289/sq mi)
- Time zone: UTC−06:00
- Postal code: 10405

San Rafael is a district of the Puriscal canton in the San José province of Costa Rica.

== Geography ==
San Rafael has an area of 15.53 km^{2} and an elevation of 825 metres.

== Demographics ==
Historical population
Census	Pop.	±% p.a.
1892	771	—
1927	1,957	+2.70%
1950	1,620	−0.82%
1963	2,104	+2.03%
1973	2,075	−0.14%
1984	1,426	−3.35%
2000	1,524	+0.42%
2011	1,730	+1.16%
2022	2,156	+2.02%
Source: Instituto Nacional de Estadística y Censos; Centro Centroamericano de Población

For the 2011 census, San Rafael had a population of 1,730 inhabitants.

== Transportation ==
=== Road transportation ===
The district is covered by the following road routes:

- National Route 314
