= Barbacoas District =

District in Puriscal canton, San José province, Costa Rica

Barbacoas
- District
- Interactive map of Barbacoas
- Barbacoas district location in Costa Rica
- Coordinates: 9.8574384°N 84.3655956°W
- Country: Costa Rica
- Province: San José
- Canton: Puriscal

Area
  - Total: 18.74 km^{2} (7.24 sq mi)
- Elevation: 1,160 m (3,810 ft)

Population (2011)
  - Total: 3,692
  - Density: 197.0/km^{2} (510.3/sq mi)
- Time zone: UTC−06:00
- Postal code: 10403

Barbacoas is a district of the Puriscal canton, in the San José province of Costa Rica.

== Geography ==
Barbacoas has an area of 18.74 km^{2} and an elevation of 1,160 metres.

== Demographics ==
Historical population
Census	Pop.	±% p.a.
1883	382	—
1892	469	+2.31%
1927	1,474	+3.33%
1950	1,836	+0.96%
1963	2,398	+2.08%
1973	2,326	−0.30%
1984	2,422	+0.37%
2000	3,210	+1.78%
2011	3,692	+1.28%
2022	5,104	+2.99%
Source: Instituto Nacional de Estadística y Censos; Centro Centroamericano de Población

For the 2011 census, Barbacoas had a population of 3,692 inhabitants.

== Transportation ==
=== Road transportation ===
The district is covered by the following road routes:

- National Route 137
