= Jagüey, Aguada, Puerto Rico =

Barrio of Puerto Rico

Jagüey
- Barrio
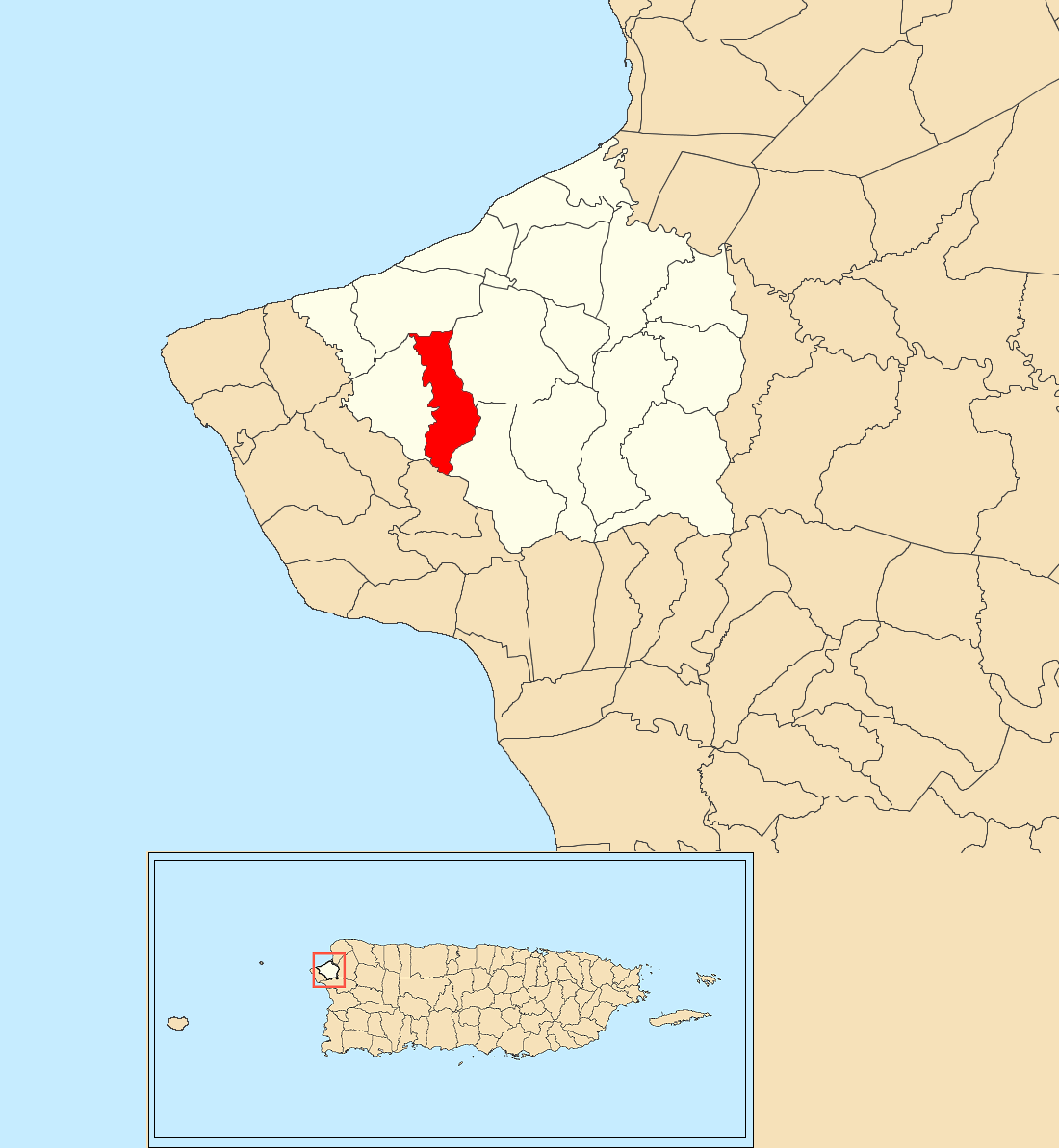
- Location of Jagüey within the municipality of Aguada shown in red

- Location of Puerto Rico
- Coordinates: 18°21′01″N 67°12′04″W
- Commonwealth: Puerto Rico
- Municipality: Aguada

Area
  - Total: 1.36 sq mi (3.5 km^{2})
  - Land: 1.36 sq mi (3.5 km^{2})
  - Water: 0.00 sq mi (0 km^{2})
- Elevation: 269 ft (82 m)

Population (2010)
  - Total: 1,995
  - Density: 1,466.9/sq mi (566.4/km^{2})
- Source: 2010 Census
- Time zone: UTC−4 (AST)
- ZIP Code: 00602
- Area codes: 787, 939

Jagüey is a barrio (county) in the municipality of Aguada, Puerto Rico. Its population in 2010 was 1,995. It is located west of the center of Aguada partly bordering the municipality of Rincón.

== History ==
Jagüey was in Spain's gazetteers until Puerto Rico was ceded by Spain in the aftermath of the Spanish–American War under the terms of the Treaty of Paris of 1898 and became an unincorporated territory of the United States. In 1899, the United States Department of War conducted a census of Puerto Rico finding that the combined population of Jagüey and Atalaya barrio was 1,195.

Historical population
Census	Pop.	Note	%±
1910	663		—
1920	709		6.9%
1930	764		7.8%
1940	985		28.9%
1950	1,087		10.4%
1960	1,232		13.3%
1970	1,458		18.3%
1980	1,686		15.6%
1990	1,678		−0.5%
2000	1,926		14.8%
2010	1,995		3.6%
U.S. Decennial Census; 1900 (N/A) 1910-1930; 1930-1950 1960 1980-2000 2010

== Sectors ==
Barrios (which are, in contemporary times, roughly comparable to minor civil divisions) in turn are further subdivided into smaller local populated place areas/units called sectores (sectors in English). The types of sectores may vary, from normally sector to urbanización to reparto to barriada to residencial, among others.

The following sectors are in Jagüey barrio:

Sector Colombani, Sector Cordero, Sector Galicia, Sector Gilberto Orama, Sector Jagüey Bajío, Sector Jagüey Chiquito, Sector La Posada, Sector Miguel A. Ruíz, Sector Parada 5, Sector Parada Galicia, Sector Parada Morales, Sector Pepe Vargas, Sector Perfecto González, Sector Villa de la Paz, and Tramo Carretera 403.

== See also ==
- List of communities in Puerto Rico
- List of barrios and sectors of Aguada, Puerto Rico
