= Piedras Negras =

Piedras Negras may refer to:

- Piedras Negras, Coahuila, a city in the state of Coahuila, Mexico
  - Piedras Negras Municipality, a municipality in Mexico, with the center in the eponymous city
- Piedras Negras (Maya site), an archaeological site of the pre-Columbian Maya civilization, located in the present-day Petén department of Guatemala
- Piedras Negras District
- Piedras Negras International Airport
