= Atalaya, Aguada, Puerto Rico =

Barrio of Puerto Rico

Atalaya
- Barrio
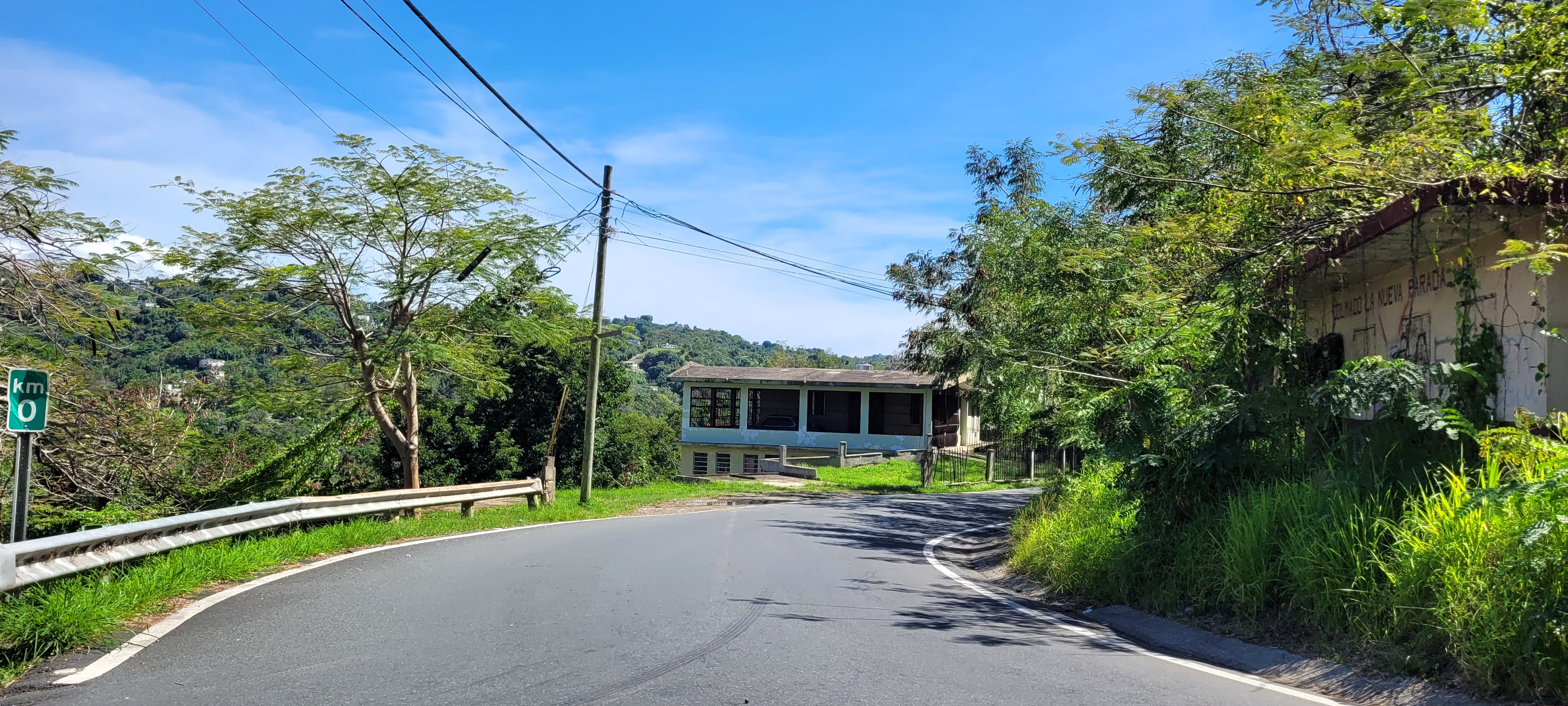
- Puerto Rico Highway 411 in Atalaya

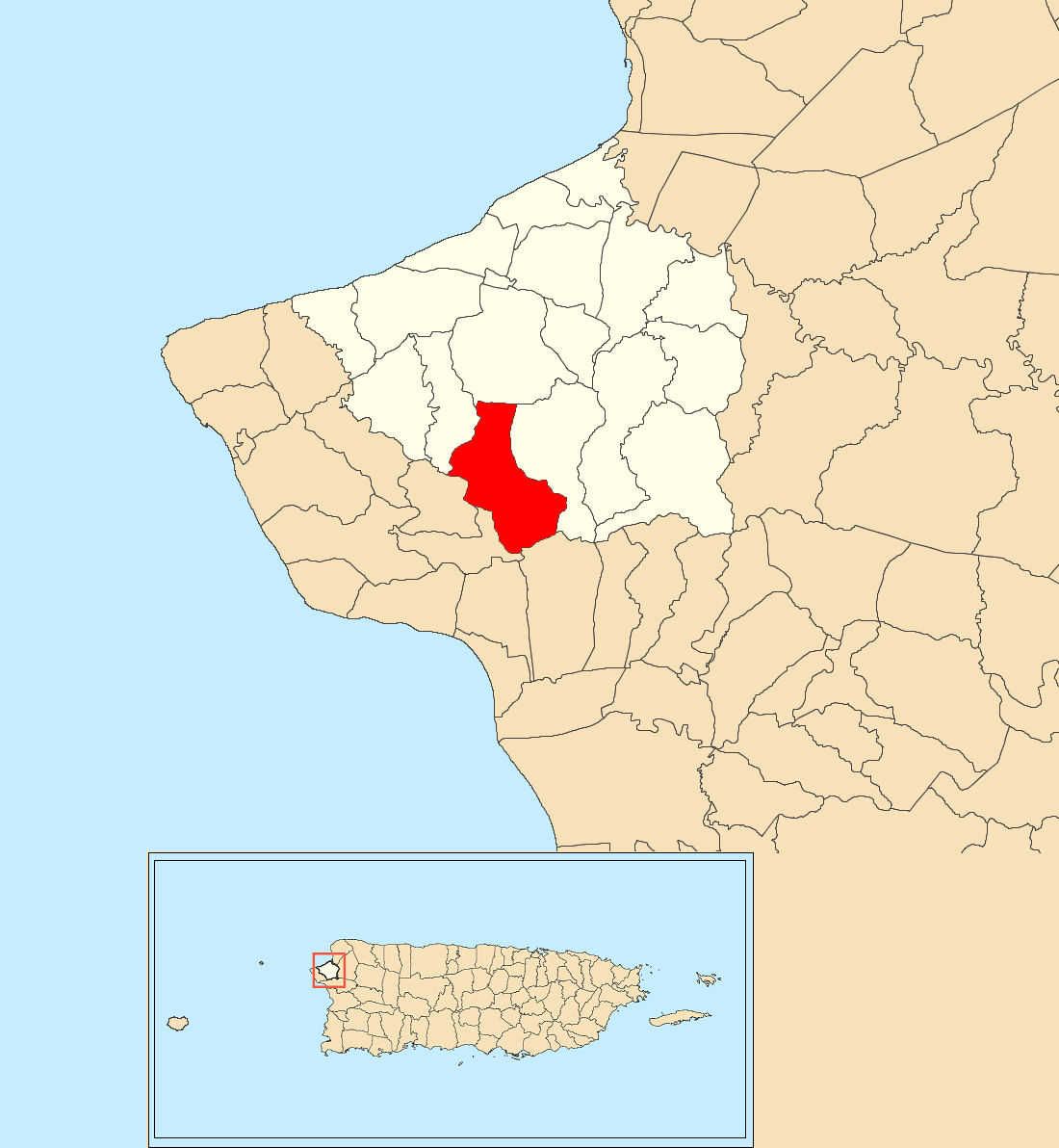
- Location of Atalaya within the municipality of Aguada shown in red

- Location of Puerto Rico
- Coordinates: 18°19′49″N 67°11′11″W
- Commonwealth: Puerto Rico
- Municipality: Aguada

Area
  - Total: 2.36 sq mi (6.1 km^{2})
  - Land: 2.36 sq mi (6.1 km^{2})
  - Water: 0.00 sq mi (0 km^{2})
- Elevation: 794 ft (242 m)

Population (2010)
  - Total: 3,108
  - Density: 1,316.9/sq mi (508.5/km^{2})
- Source: 2010 Census
- Time zone: UTC−4 (AST)
- ZIP Code: 00602
- Area codes: 787, 939

Atalaya is a barrio in the municipality of Aguada, Puerto Rico. Its population in 2010 was 3,108.

== History ==
Atalaya was in Spain's gazetteers until Puerto Rico was ceded by Spain in the aftermath of the Spanish–American War under the terms of the Treaty of Paris of 1898 and became an unincorporated territory of the United States. In 1899, the United States Department of War conducted a census of Puerto Rico finding that the combined population of Atalaya barrio and Jagüey barrio was 1,195.

Historical population
| Census | Pop. | Note | %± |
|---|---|---|---|
| 1910 | 586 | | — |
| 1920 | 731 | | 24.7% |
| 1930 | 1,031 | | 41.0% |
| 1940 | 953 | | −7.6% |
| 1950 | 1,449 | | 52.0% |
| 1960 | 1,541 | | 6.3% |
| 1970 | 1,840 | | 19.4% |
| 1980 | 2,350 | | 27.7% |
| 1990 | 2,430 | | 3.4% |
| 2000 | 2,767 | | 13.9% |
| 2010 | 3,108 | | 12.3% |
U.S. Decennial Census; 1900 (N/A) 1910-1930; 1930-1950 1960 1980-2000 2010

== Sectors ==
Barrios (which are, in contemporary times, roughly comparable to minor civil divisions) in turn are further subdivided into smaller local populated place areas/units called sectores (sectors in English). The types of sectores may vary, from normally sector to urbanización to reparto to barriada to residencial, among others.

The following sectors are in Atalaya barrio:

Sector Figueroa, Sector Juanito Abreu, Sector Los Concepción, Sector Los Cordero, Sector Los Rodríguez, Sector Matías, Sector Pedro Ruíz, Sector Vega, and Tramo Carretera 411.

== Earthquakes ==
During the 2019-2020 Puerto Rico earthquakes the Lydia Meléndez School in Asomante barrio served as a refuge for residents from Atalaya, Cerro Gordo, and Las Marías (nearby barrios), who had to leave their damaged homes.

== See also ==
- List of communities in Puerto Rico
- List of barrios and sectors of Aguada, Puerto Rico
