= Colón, Costa Rica =

District in Mora canton, San José province, Costa Rica

Colón
- District
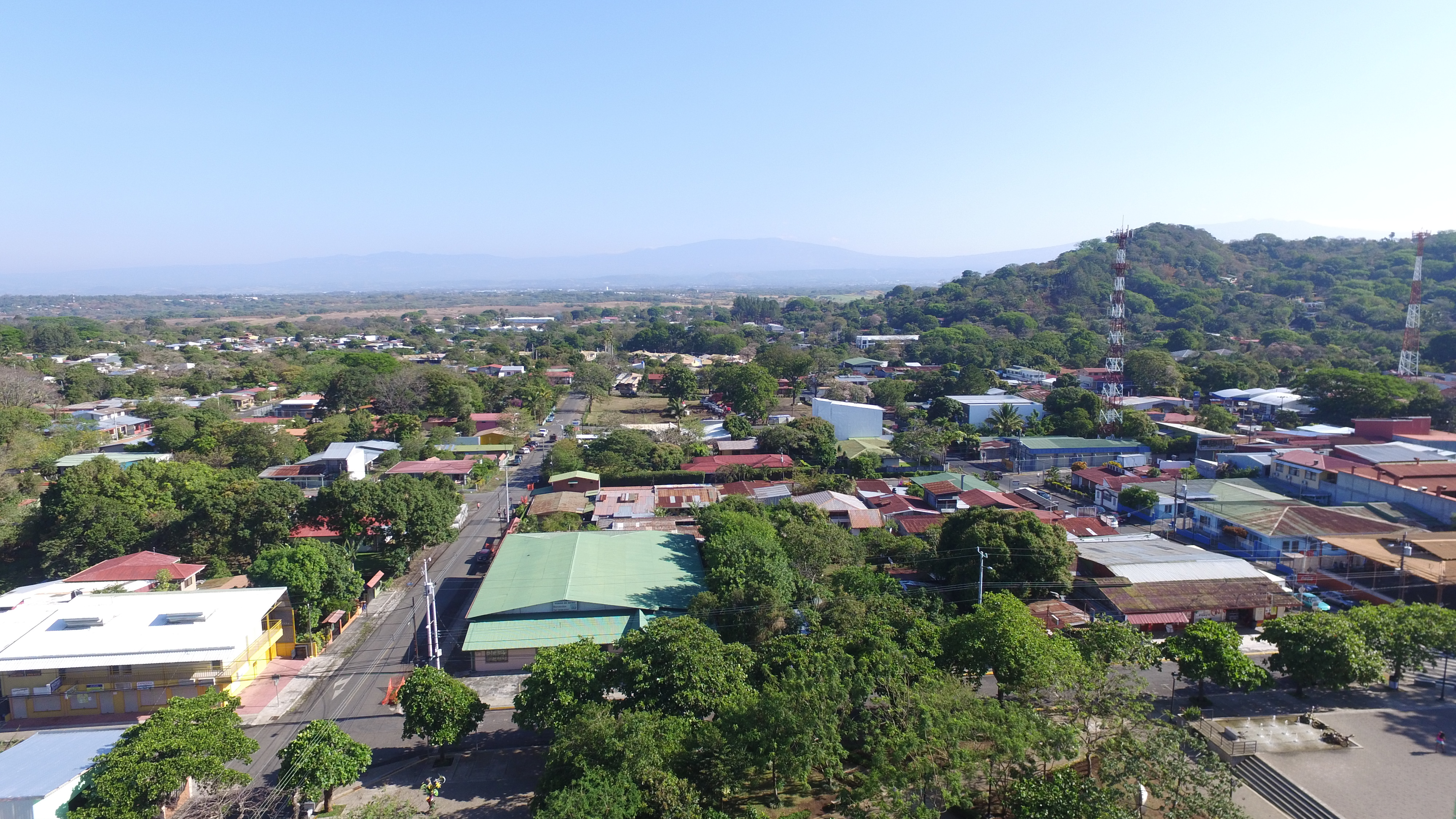
- Ciudad Colón, aerial view
- Interactive map of Colón
- Colón district location in Costa Rica
- Coordinates: 9.9096293°N 84.2620424°W
- Country: Costa Rica
- Province: San José
- Canton: Mora

Area
  - Total: 40.12 km^{2} (15.49 sq mi)
- Elevation: 840 m (2,760 ft)

Population (2011)
  - Total: 16,088
  - Density: 401.0/km^{2} (1,039/sq mi)
- Time zone: UTC−06:00
- Postal code: 10701

Colón, more commonly referred to as Ciudad Colón is a district and the head city of the Mora canton, in the San José province of Costa Rica. It is famous for its warm climate, proximity to nature and its surrounding mountains, folkloric traditions, horse riding, and multiculturalism.

== Toponymy ==
Named after Christopher Columbus (Spanish: Cristóbal Colón), Ciudad Colón used to be called Villa Colón, and before that it was called Pacaca, which was the name of the chief of a local tribe.

== Geography ==
Colón has an area of 40.12 km^{2} and an elevation of 840 metres.

== Demographics ==
Historical population
Census	Pop.	±% p.a.
1864	898	—
1883	879	−0.11%
1892	891	+0.15%
1927	2,715	+3.23%
1950	2,699	−0.03%
1963	3,542	+2.11%
1973	5,122	+3.76%
1984	7,361	+3.35%
2000	13,477	+3.85%
2011	16,088	+1.62%
2022	17,274	+0.65%
Source: Instituto Nacional de Estadística y Censos; Centro Centroamericano de Población

For the 2011 census, Colón had a population of 16,088 inhabitants.

Colón can be considered as cosmopolitan as Santa Ana or Escazu, but in terms of amenities and services available, it is considered a typical small Costa Rican town. The cost of living is lower than in Santa Ana or Escazu. There are two major supermarkets that meet the needs and requirements of expatriates and dozens of other small stores, banks and pharmacies. There are no upscale bars or restaurants but there are many local venues catering to food and entertainment. Ciudad Colón is particularly suitable for outdoor activities such as horse riding, mountainboarding, biking, running and hiking.

== Locations ==
Located some 6 km out into the hills is the United Nations University for Peace (UPEACE). People from over 60 nationalities live in Ciudad Colón at any given time, making it one of the most multi-cultural towns of its size in the world. Most of this expatriate population consists of students, faculty members, and visiting professors from the university.

Close to the town is Quitirrisí, an indigenous reserve in the Central Valley known for the residents' handcraft abilities.

== Transportation ==
=== Road transportation ===
The district is covered by the following road routes:

- National Route 22
- National Route 121
- National Route 136
- National Route 239
