= Desamparaditos =

District in San José province, Costa Rica

- District
- Interactive map of Desamparaditos
- Desamparaditos district location in Costa Rica
- Coordinates: 9.8791508°N 84.3446431°W
- Country: Costa Rica
- Province: San José
- Canton: Puriscal

Area
  - Total: 7.14 km^{2} (2.76 sq mi)
- Elevation: 765 m (2,510 ft)

Population (2011)
  - Total: 666
  - Density: 93.3/km^{2} (242/sq mi)
- Time zone: UTC−06:00
- Postal code: 10407

Desamparaditos is a district of the Puriscal canton, in the San José province of Costa Rica.

== Geography ==
Desamparaditos has an area of 7.14 km^{2} and an elevation of 765 metres.

== Demographics ==
Historical population
Census	Pop.	±% p.a.
1864	1,371	—
1883	389	−6.42%
1892	491	+2.62%
1927	596	+0.56%
1950	554	−0.32%
1963	616	+0.82%
1973	538	−1.34%
1984	467	−1.28%
2000	572	+1.28%
2011	666	+1.39%
2022	907	+2.85%
Source: Instituto Nacional de Estadística y Censos; Centro Centroamericano de Población

For the 2011 census, Desamparaditos had a population of 666 inhabitants.

== Transportation ==
=== Road transportation ===
The district is covered by the following road routes:

- National Route 136
