= Picagres =

District in Mora canton, San José province, Costa Rica

- District
- Picagres district
- Picagres district location in Costa Rica
- Coordinates: 9.907422°N 84.3741075°W
- Country: Costa Rica
- Province: San José
- Canton: Mora

Area
  - Total: 27.2 km^{2} (10.5 sq mi)
- Elevation: 520 m (1,710 ft)

Population (2011)
  - Total: 675
  - Density: 24.8/km^{2} (64.3/sq mi)
- Time zone: UTC−06:00
- Postal code: 10705

Picagres is a district of the Mora canton, in the San José province of Costa Rica.

== Geography ==
Picagres has an area of 27.2 km^{2} and an elevation of 520 metres.

== Demographics ==
Historical population
| Census | Pop. | ±% p.a. |
|---|---|---|
| 1883 | 287 | — |
| 1892 | 388 | +3.41% |
| 1927 | 1,574 | +4.08% |
| 1950 | 1,188 | −1.22% |
| 1963 | 1,082 | −0.72% |
| 1973 | 797 | −3.01% |
| 1984 | 674 | −1.51% |
| 2000 | 662 | −0.11% |
| 2011 | 675 | +0.18% |
| 2022 | 1,111 | +4.63% |
Source: Instituto Nacional de Estadística y Censos; Centro Centroamericano de Población

For the 2011 census, Picagres had a population of 675 inhabitants.

== Transportation ==
=== Road transportation ===
The district is covered by the following road routes:

- National Route 136
