= National Route 317 (Costa Rica) =

National Road Route in Costa Rica

National Tertiary Route 317
- Ruta nacional terciaria 317

Route information
- Maintained by Ministry of Public Works and Transport
- Length: 9.475 km (5.887 mi)

Location
- Country: Costa Rica
- Provinces: San José

Highway system
- National Road Network of Costa Rica
← Route 316	→ Route 318

National Tertiary Route 317, or just Route 317 (Spanish: Ruta Nacional Terciaria 317, or Ruta 317) is a National Road Route of Costa Rica located in the San José province.

== Description ==
In San José province the route covers Puriscal canton (Mercedes Sur, Candelarita districts).
