= National Route 316 (Costa Rica) =

National Road Route in Costa Rica

National Tertiary Route 316
- Ruta nacional terciaria 316

Route information
- Maintained by Ministry of Public Works and Transport
- Length: 8.915 km (5.540 mi)

Location
- Country: Costa Rica
- Provinces: San José

Highway system
- National Road Network of Costa Rica
← Route 315	→ Route 317

National Tertiary Route 316, or just Route 316 (Spanish: Ruta Nacional Terciaria 316, or Ruta 316) is a National Road Route of Costa Rica located in the San José province.

== Description ==
In San José province the route covers Puriscal canton (San Antonio district), Mora canton (Piedras Negras district).
