= National Route 314 (Costa Rica) =

National Road Route in Costa Rica

National Tertiary Route 314
- Ruta nacional terciaria 314

Route information
- Maintained by Ministry of Public Works and Transport
- Length: 9.765 km (6.068 mi)

Location
- Country: Costa Rica
- Provinces: San José

Highway system
- National Road Network of Costa Rica
← Route 313	→ Route 315

National Tertiary Route 314, or just Route 314 (Spanish: Ruta Nacional Terciaria 314, or Ruta 314) is a National Road Route of Costa Rica located in the San José province.

== Description ==
In San José province the route covers Puriscal canton (Santiago and San Rafael districts).
