= Asomante, Aguada, Puerto Rico =

Barrio of Puerto Rico

Asomante
- Barrio
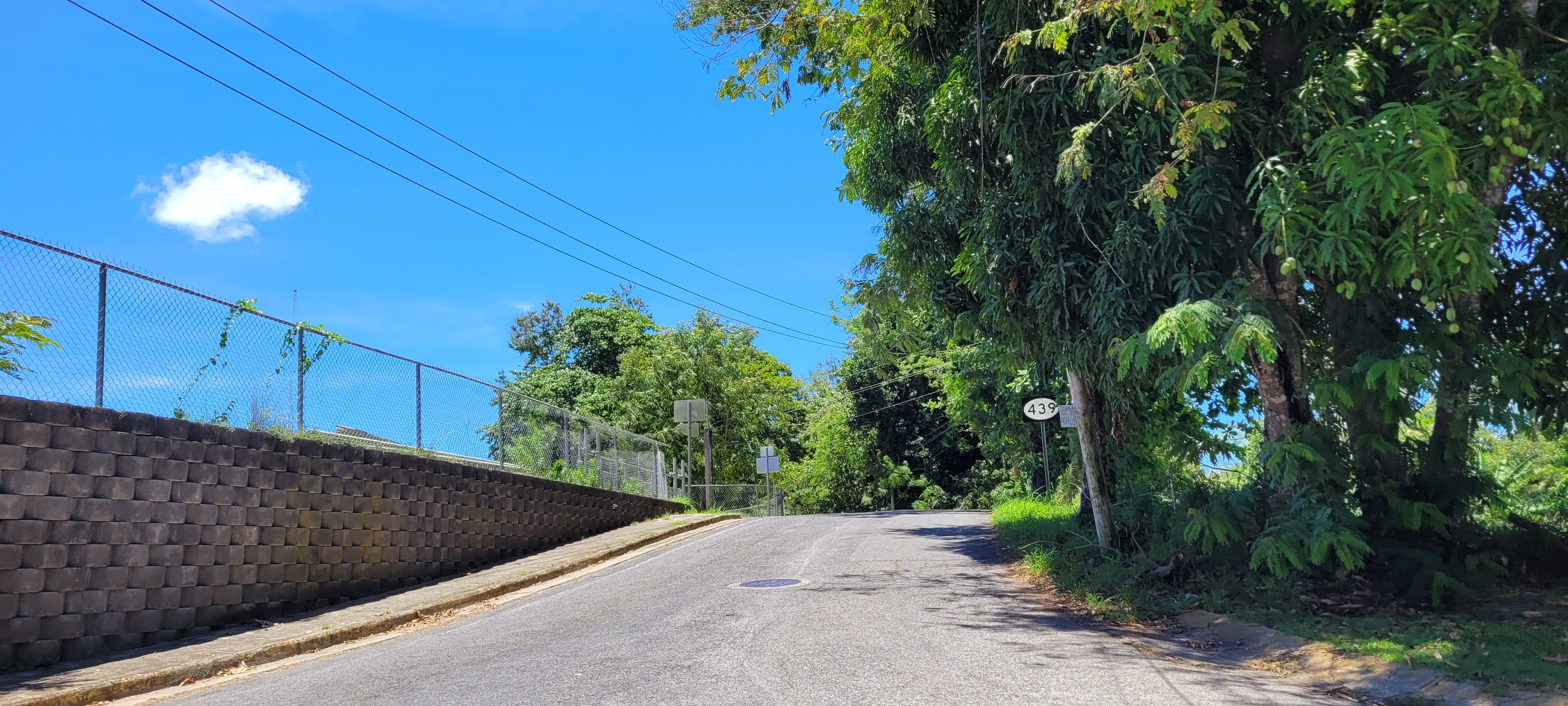
- Puerto Rico Highway 439 in Asomante

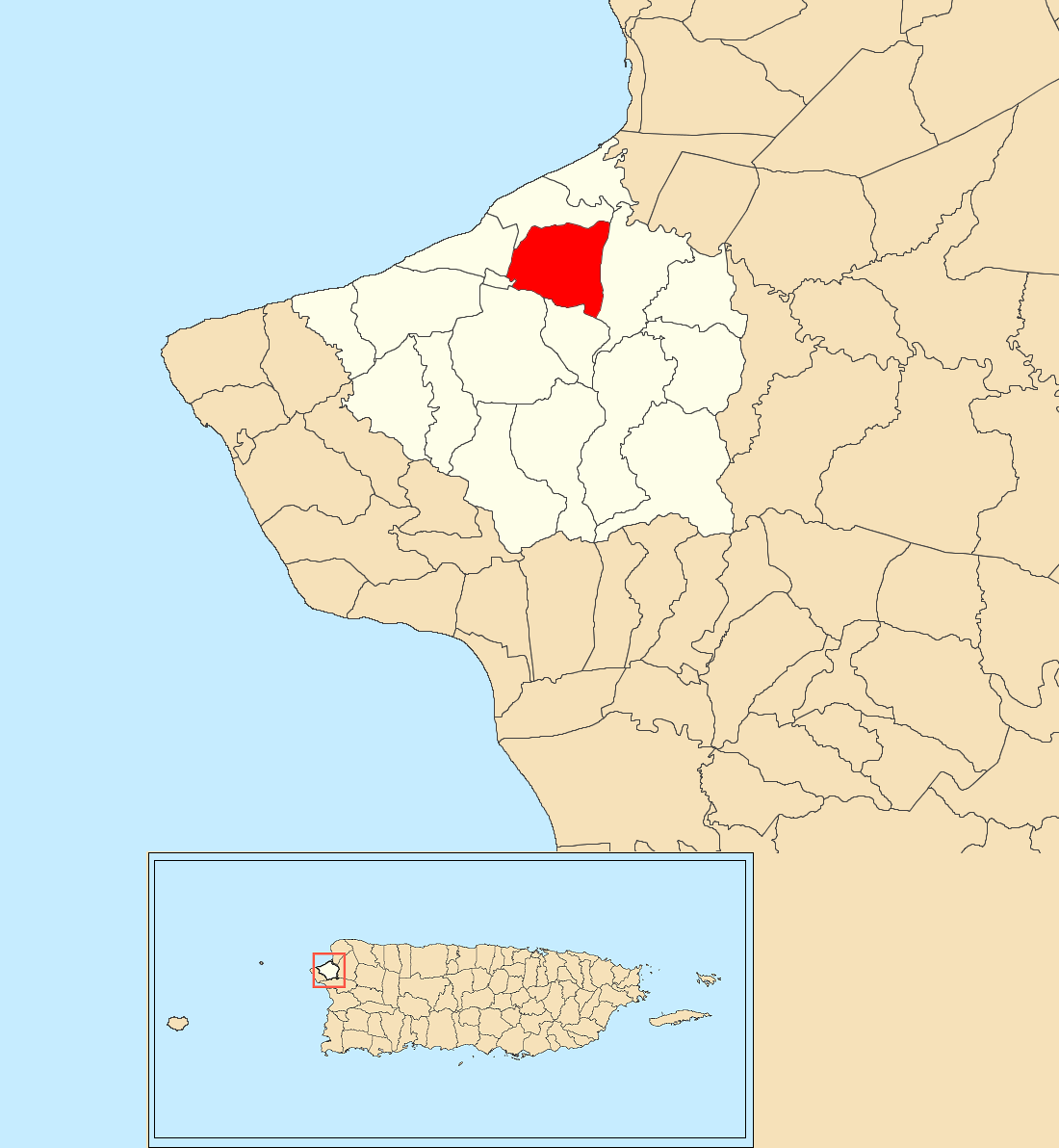
- Location of Asomante within the municipality of Aguada shown in red

- Location of Puerto Rico
- Coordinates: 18°23′02″N 67°10′20″W
- Commonwealth: Puerto Rico
- Municipality: Aguada

Area
  - Total: 1.834 sq mi (4.75 km^{2})
  - Land: 1.834 sq mi (4.75 km^{2})
  - Water: 0 sq mi (0 km^{2})
- Elevation: 52 ft (16 m)

Population (2010)
  - Total: 3,177
  - Density: 1,736.1/sq mi (670.3/km^{2})
- Source: 2010 Census
- Time zone: UTC−4 (AST)
- ZIP Code: 00602
- Area codes: 787, 939

Asomante is a barrio in the municipality of Aguada, Puerto Rico. Its population in 2010 was 3,177.

== History ==
Asomante was in Spain's gazetteers until Puerto Rico was ceded by Spain in the aftermath of the Spanish–American War under the terms of the Treaty of Paris of 1898 and became an unincorporated territory of the United States. In 1899, the United States Department of War conducted a census of Puerto Rico finding that the combined population of Asomante barrio and Piedras Blancas barrio was 1,162.

Historical population
Census	Pop.	Note	%±
1910	287		—
1920	334		16.4%
1930	426		27.5%
1940	434		1.9%
1950	466		7.4%
1960	667		43.1%
1970	0		−100.0%
1980	1,914		—
1990	2,613		36.5%
2000	3,268		25.1%
2010	3,117		−4.6%
U.S. Decennial Census; 1900 (N/A) 1910-1930; 1930-1950 1960 1980-2000 2010

== Sectors ==
Barrios (which are, in contemporary times, roughly comparable to minor civil divisions) in turn are further subdivided into smaller local populated place areas/units called sectores (sectors in English). The types of sectores may vary, from normally sector to urbanización to reparto to barriada to residencial, among others.

The following sectors are in Asomante barrio:

Apartamentos Portales del Navegante, Avenida Rotario, Carretera 416 (west side), Carretera 417 Norte, Carretera 417 Sur, Égida Hogar Mi Casita Feliz, Hogar María del Carmen, Parcelas Las Minas, Reparto Bonet, Residencial Aguada Gardens, Residencial Los Almendros, Sector Acevedo, Sector Brisas de Coloso, Sector Colinas del Valle, Sector Corozas, Sector Cuesta Los Chicharrones, Sector Las Guabas, Sector Los Quiñones, Sector Muñiz, Sector Vargas, Sector Vertedero, Sector Villa Alameda, Sector Villarrubia, Urbanización Los Flamboyanes, Urbanización San Francisco, Urbanización y Extensión Jardines de Aguada, and Urbanización y Extensión San José.

In Asomante barrio is part of the Aguada urban zone.

== Earthquakes ==
During the 2019-2020 Puerto Rico earthquakes the Lydia Meléndez School in Asomante served as a refuge for residents from Cerro Gordo, Las Marías and Atalaya (nearby barrios) who had to leave their damaged homes.

== See also ==
- List of communities in Puerto Rico
- List of barrios and sectors of Aguada, Puerto Rico
