= National Route 136 (Costa Rica) =

National Road Route in Costa Rica

National Secondary Route 136
- Ruta nacional secundaria 136

Route information
- Maintained by Ministry of Public Works and Transport
- Length: 28.625 km (17.787 mi)

Location
- Country: Costa Rica
- Provinces: San José, Alajuela

Highway system
- National Road Network of Costa Rica
← Route 135	→ Route 137

National Secondary Route 136, or just Route 136 (Spanish: Ruta Nacional Secundaria 136, or Ruta 136) is a National Road Route of Costa Rica located in the San José and Alajuela provinces.

== Description ==
In San José province the route covers Puriscal canton (Santiago, Desamparaditos districts) and Mora canton (Colón, Piedras Negras, and Picagres districts).

In Alajuela province the route covers Alajuela canton (Turrúcares and Garita districts).
