= National Route 137 (Costa Rica) =

National Road Route in Costa Rica

National Secondary Route 137
- Ruta nacional secundaria 137

Route information
- Maintained by Ministry of Public Works and Transport
- Length: 41.410 km (25.731 mi)

Location
- Country: Costa Rica
- Provinces: San José, Alajuela

Highway system
- National Road Network of Costa Rica
← Route 136	→ Route 138

National Secondary Route 137, or just Route 137 (Spanish: Ruta Nacional Secundaria 137, or Ruta 137) is a National Road Route of Costa Rica located in the San José and Alajuela provinces.

== Description ==
In San José province the route covers Puriscal canton (Santiago, Barbacoas, and Grifo Alto districts) and Turrubares canton (San Pablo, San Pedro, and San Juan de Mata districts).

In Alajuela province the route covers Orotina canton (Orotina district).
