= Tabarcia =

District in Mora canton, San José province, Costa Rica

- District
- Tabarcia district
- Tabarcia district location in Costa Rica
- Coordinates: 9.847059°N 84.2062648°W
- Country: Costa Rica
- Province: San José
- Canton: Mora

Area
  - Total: 40.39 km^{2} (15.59 sq mi)
- Elevation: 817 m (2,680 ft)

Population (2011)
  - Total: 4,703
  - Density: 116.4/km^{2} (301.6/sq mi)
- Time zone: UTC−06:00
- Postal code: 10703

Tabarcia is a district of the Mora canton, in the San José province of Costa Rica.

== Geography ==
Tabarcia has an area of 40.39 km^{2} and an elevation of 817 metres.

== Demographics ==
Historical population
Census	Pop.	±% p.a.
1864	760	—
1883	551	−1.68%
1892	499	−1.10%
1927	1,668	+3.51%
1950	1,873	+0.51%
1963	2,442	+2.06%
1973	2,864	+1.61%
1984	2,715	−0.48%
2000	3,994	+2.44%
2011	4,703	+1.50%
2022	4,793	+0.17%
Source: Instituto Nacional de Estadística y Censos; Centro Centroamericano de Población

For the 2011 census, Tabarcia had a population of 4,703 inhabitants.

== Transportation ==
=== Road transportation ===
The district is covered by the following road routes:

- National Route 209
