= List of barrios and sectors of Aguada, Puerto Rico =

Like all municipalities of Puerto Rico, Aguada is subdivided into administrative units called barrios, which are, in contemporary times, roughly comparable to minor civil divisions, (and means wards or boroughs or neighborhoods in English). The barrios and subbarrios, in turn, are further subdivided into smaller local populated place areas/units called sectores (sectors in English). The types of sectores may vary, from normally sector to urbanización to reparto to barriada to residencial, among others.

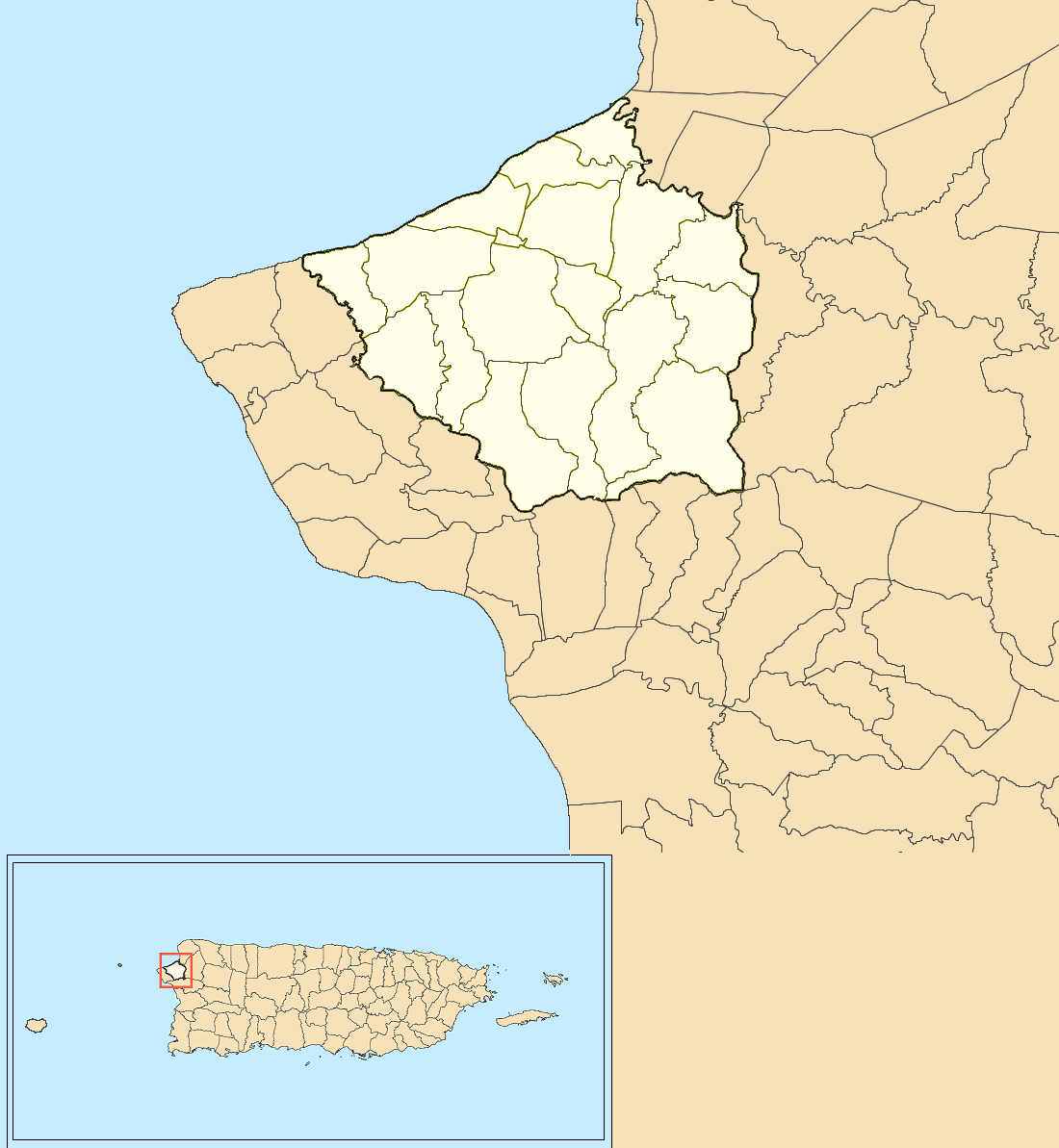
Aguada map with barrio subdivisions

== List of sectors by barrio ==
=== Aguada barrio-pueblo ===
- Calle Ermita
- Calle Manuel Ruíz González
- Calle Paz
- Hogar Love and Care
- Residencias de Colores
- Sector California
- Sector Olivo
- Sector Rosario
- Urbanización Moropó
- Urbanización San Cristóbal
- Urbanización Montemar

=== Asomante ===
- Apartamentos Portales del Navegante
- Avenida Rotario
- Carretera 416
- Carretera 417
- Égida Hogar Mi Casita Feliz
- Hogar María del Carmen
- Parcelas Las Minas
- Reparto Bonet
- Residencial Aguada Gardens
- Residencial Los Almendros
- Sector Acevedo
- Sector Brisas de Coloso
- Sector Colinas del Valle
- Sector Corozas
- Sector Cuesta Los Chicharrones
- Sector Las Guabas
- Sector Los Quiñones
- Sector Muñiz
- Sector Rosario
- Sector Vargas
- Sector Vertedero
- Sector Villa Alameda
- Sector Villarrubia
- Urbanización Los Flamboyanes
- Urbanización San Francisco
- Urbanización y Extensión Jardines de Aguada
- Urbanización y Extensión San José

=== Atalaya ===
- Sector Figueroa
- Sector Juanito Abreu
- Sector Los Concepción
- Sector Los Cordero
- Sector Los Rodríguez
- Sector Matías
- Sector Pedro Ruíz
- Sector Vega
- Tramo Carretera 411

=== Carrizal ===
- Comunidad Las Flores
- Égida Hogar Emmanuel Community Home
- Parcelas Palmar Novoa Nuevas
- Sector Aponte
- Sector El Mameyito
- Sector Hormigonera
- Sector La Vía
- Sector Punta Boquerón
- Sector Tablonal
- Urbanización Villa Camaly

=== Cerro Gordo ===
- Comunidad Aislada
- Hogar La Igualdad Inc.
- Sector Claudio Miranda
- Sector Concho Pérez
- Sector David Acevedo
- Sector Gabino Negrón
- Sector García
- Sector Gil Feliciano
- Sector Hotel Paraíso
- Sector Ito López
- Sector Juan Ramírez
- Sector La Cadena
- Sector La Ceiba
- Sector Lalo Ruiz
- Sector Lolo Pepe
- Sector Marcelino “Lin” Vega
- Sector Marcos Rojas
- Sector Mariano Concepción
- Sector Morales
- Sector Nino López
- Sector Patricio Vega
- Sector Quebrada Larga
- Tramo Carretera 110

=== Cruces ===
- Sector 4 Esquinas
- Sector Chago Mero
- Sector Chelo Matías
- Sector Cruces
- Sector El Calvario
- Sector El Túnel
- Sector Gelin Soto
- Sector Goyito Muñiz
- Sector Guillo Goyco
- Sector Juan Cardona
- Sector Juan Soto
- Sector La Sombra
- Sector Las Cruces
- Sector Lino Morales
- Sector Lino Ríos
- Sector Muñoz
- Sector Rito Ríos
- Sector Rufino Pérez
- Sector Tildo López

=== Espinar ===
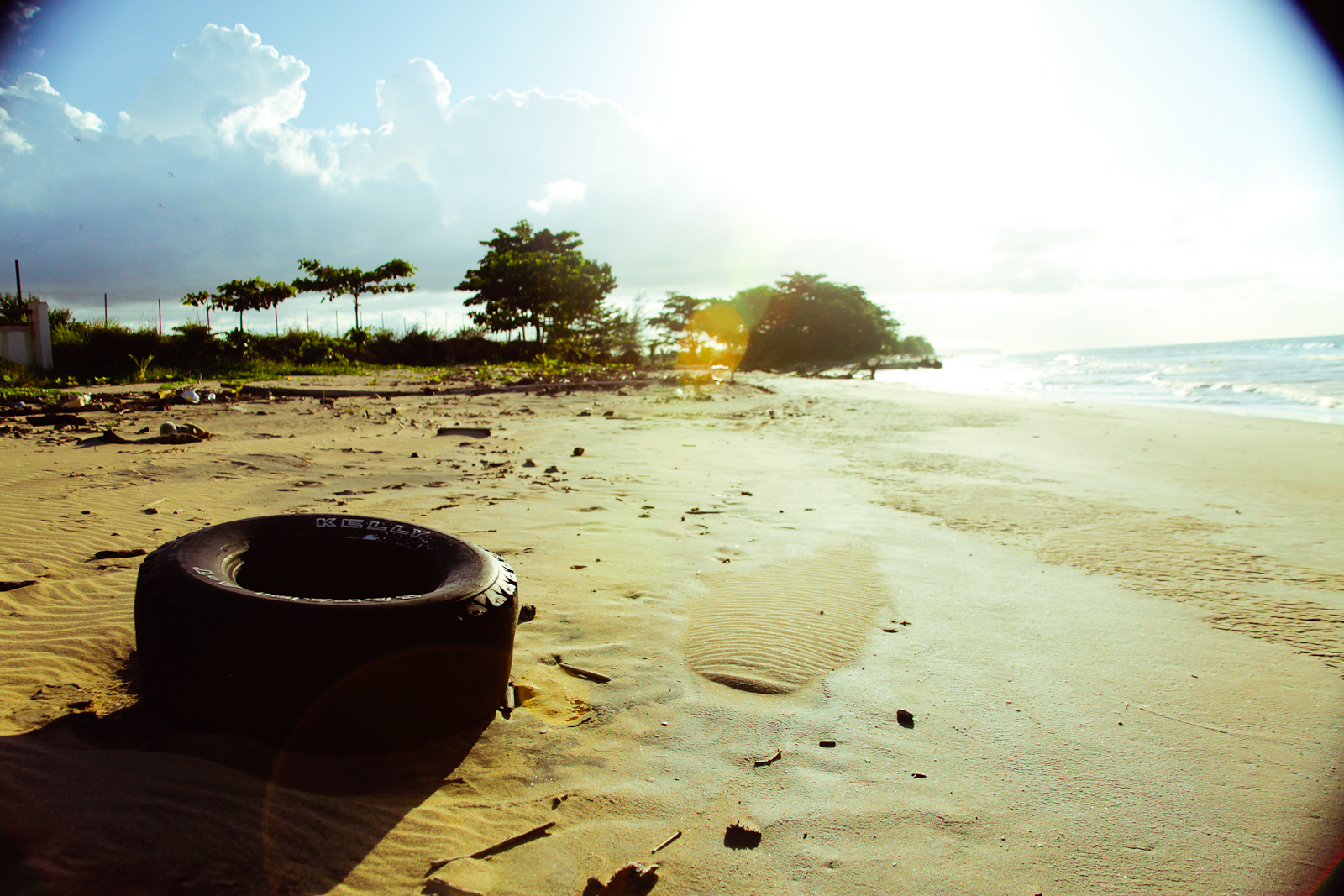
Beach in Aguada

- Brisas de Espinar (Solares)
- Parcelas Pastos Comunales
- Sector El Caracol
- Sector Hernández Ramírez
- Sector Hoyo Frío
- Sector La Playa
- Sector Marcial
- Sector Río Culebrinas

=== Guanábano ===
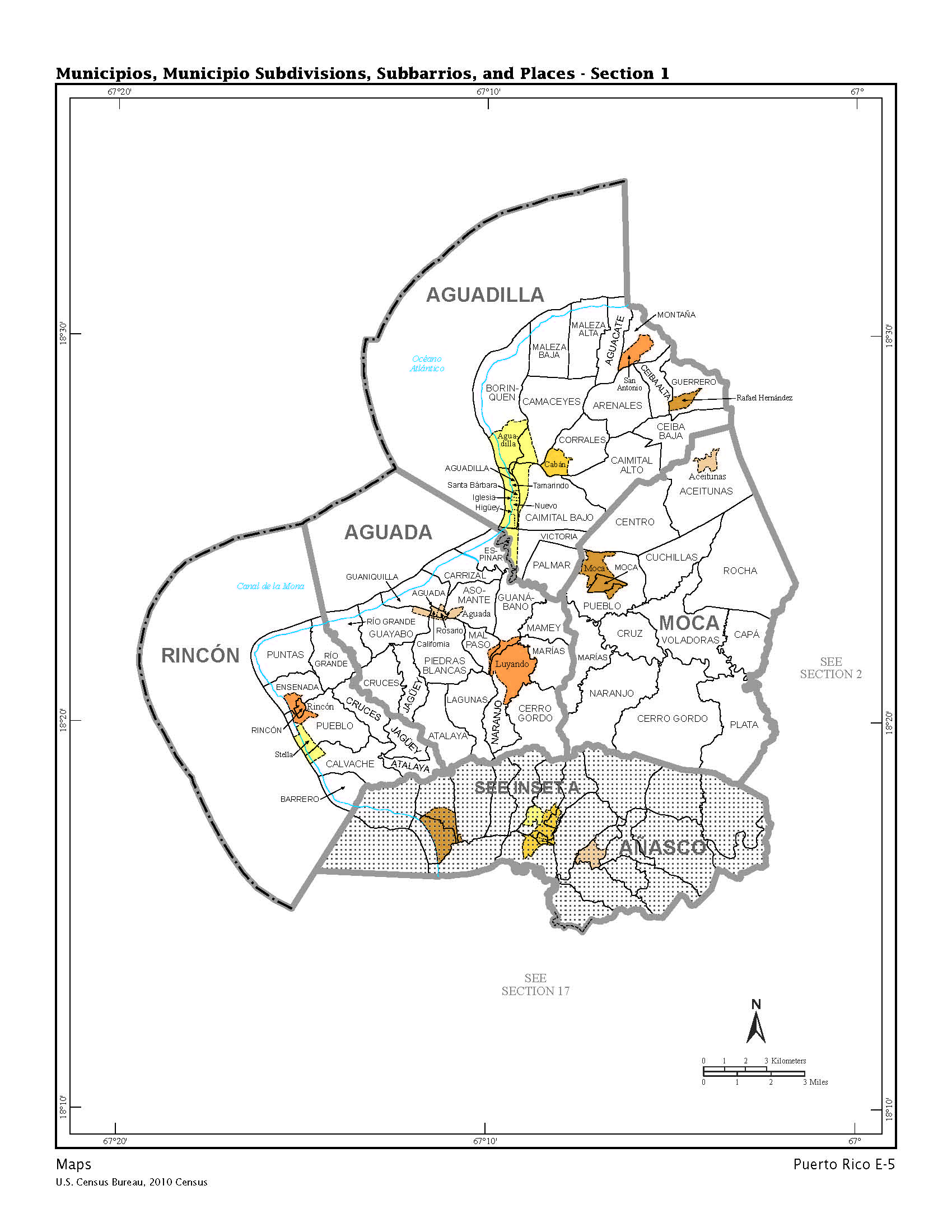
The US 2010 census map of Municipios, Municipio Subdivisions, Subbarrios, and Places of Aguadilla, Aguada, Rincón, and Moca shows a place called Loyando and Sector Rosario located in multiple barrios.

- Parcelas Luyando
- Sector Beníquez
- Sector Coloso
- Sector David Miranda
- Sector Las Bimbas
- Sector Militar

=== Guaniquilla ===
- Apartamentos Aguada Elderly
- Apartamentos Villarena Resort
- Calle Estación
- Urbanización Montemar
- Condominio Bahía Azul
- Condominio Elderly Apartments
- Extensión Los Robles
- Parcelas Palmar Novoa
- Reparto González
- Reparto Los Maestros
- Reparto Minerva
- Residencial Los Robles
- Reparto Hernández
- Sector Casualidad
- Sector Jaguey
- Sector Pico de Piedra
- Sector Pitusa o Tramo Carretera 115
- Sector Tosquero
- Sector Valle del Atlántico
- Sector Villa Santoni
- Tramo Carretera 441
- Urbanización Alturas de Aguada
- Urbanización Isabel La Católica
- Urbanización Pública Francisco Egipciaco

=== Guayabo ===
- Avenida Nativo Alers
- Condominio Mar Azul
- Condominio Ocean View Castle
- Extensión Casualidad
- Sector El Palmar
- Sector El Túnel
- Sector Hacienda El Palmar
- Sector Juan Cardona
- Sector La Mora
- Sector Las Cruces
- Sector Miguel A. Ruíz
- Sector Pancho Agudo
- Sector Pascual Muñoz
- Sector Rosario
- Sector Silva
- Tramo Carretera 115
- Urbanización El Palmar
- Urbanización Villas del Palmar

=== Jagüey ===
- Sector Colombani
- Sector Cordero
- Sector Galicia
- Sector Gilberto Orama
- Sector Jagüey Bajío
- Sector Jagüey Chiquito
- Sector La Posada
- Sector Miguel A. Ruíz
- Sector Parada 5
- Sector Parada Galicia
- Sector Parada Morales
- Sector Pepe Vargas
- Sector Perfecto González
- Sector Villa de la Paz
- Tramo Carretera 403

=== Lagunas ===
- Sector Anselmo González
- Sector Atalaya III
- Sector Cabo Díaz
- Sector Canal 44
- Sector Carlos Concepción
- Sector Carlos Ruíz
- Sector Clotilde Chaparro
- Sector Cordero
- Sector Dos Vistas
- Sector El Deportivo
- Sector El Jibarito
- Sector El Mangoito
- Sector El Río
- Sector Gavina Mendoza
- Sector Jacob Méndez
- Sector Juan Tola
- Sector La Paloma
- Sector Los Crespo
- Sector Los Méndez
- Sector Manuel Echevarría
- Sector Néctar Rodríguez
- Sector Papo Feliciano
- Sector Parada García
- Sector Pedro Cáceres
- Sector Pepe Moreno
- Sector Piedra Gorda
- Sector Pilar Figueroa
- Sector Pin Orama
- Sector Rubén Rosa
- Sector Ruíz
- Sector Sico Vega

=== Malpaso ===
- Apartamentos Piedras Blancas
- Parcelas Cornelias
- Parcelas Las Minas
- Sector Avilés
- Sector Bucaré
- Sector Cáceres
- Sector César Ruiz
- Sector Chevo Sánchez
- Sector El Criollito
- Sector Los Bimbas
- Sector Militar
- Sector Rosa
- Sector Sabana
- Sector Santiago Ruiz
- Sector Sony Hill
- Sector Tatín Varela
- Sector Vadi
- Sector Villarrubia
- Urbanización Colinas Vista Azul

=== Mamey ===
- Carretera 110
- Sector Acevedo
- Sector Adrián López
- Sector Cordero
- Sector Hito Acevedo
- Sector La Cocorita
- Sector Los Jiménez
- Sector Los Ratones
- Sector Nango Soto
- Sector Pablo López
- Sector Patrio Acevedo
- Sector Plan Bonito
- Sector Solares Pabón
- Sector Tony Cortez
- Tramo Carretera 4417

=== Marías ===
- Sector Botti
- Sector Delfín Cortés
- Sector Eloy Villanueva
- Sector Gabino López
- Sector Hoyo Frío
- Sector Julio Nieves
- Sector La Viuda Negrón
- Sector Las Bambúas
- Sector Lelo Villanueva
- Sector Los Ratones
- Sector Pablo López
- Sector Pedro López
- Sector Wilson Hernández

=== Naranjo ===
- Sector 3 Copas
- Sector Berto Vargas
- Sector Ceferino Acevedo
- Sector Cuchilla
- Sector El Coquí
- Sector El Lirio
- Sector El Manantial
- Sector Foro Soto
- Sector González
- Sector Guillermo Matías
- Sector Juan Tita
- Sector La Cadena
- Sector Lencho Pérez
- Sector Leo Flora
- Sector Militar
- Sector Mingo Echevarría
- Sector Moncho Pérez
- Sector Naranjo Abajo
- Sector Naranjo Arriba
- Sector Tano Villarrubia

=== Piedras Blancas ===
- Hogar Love and Care
- Los González
- Paseo Las Flores
- Sector Bajura
- Sector Cáceres
- Sector Chuco Ramos
- Sector Jiménez
- Sector Juana Torres
- Sector La Roca
- Sector Los Matos
- Sector Los Pinos
- Sector Manolo Chaparro
- Sector Parada Morales
- Sector Pepe Rivera
- Sector Pitirre
- Sector Rosario
- Sector Rufino Sánchez
- Tramo Carretera 411
- Urbanización Las Casonas
- Urbanización Villa Ofelia
- Urbanización Villas de Sotomayor

=== Río Grande ===
- Parcelas Matías
- Parcelas Nieves
- Sector Rosado
- Sector Tres Tiendas
- Sector Valentín

== See also ==
- List of communities in Puerto Rico
