= Piedras Negras District =

District in Mora canton, San José province, Costa Rica

Piedras Negras
- District
- Piedras Negras district
- Piedras Negras district location in Costa Rica
- Coordinates: 9.8975624°N 84.3125517°W
- Country: Costa Rica
- Province: San José
- Canton: Mora

Area
  - Total: 14.84 km^{2} (5.73 sq mi)
- Elevation: 505 m (1,657 ft)

Population (2011)
  - Total: 379
  - Density: 25.5/km^{2} (66.1/sq mi)
- Time zone: UTC−06:00
- Postal code: 10704

Piedras Negras is a district of the Mora canton, in the San José province of Costa Rica.

== Geography ==
Piedras Negras has an area of 14.84 km^{2} and an elevation of 505 metres.

== Demographics ==
Historical population
Census	Pop.	±% p.a.
1883	583	—
1892	768	+3.11%
1927	966	+0.66%
1950	870	−0.45%
1963	737	−1.27%
1973	662	−1.07%
1984	222	−9.46%
2000	318	+2.27%
2011	379	+1.61%
2022	656	+5.11%
Source: Instituto Nacional de Estadística y Censos; Centro Centroamericano de Población

For the 2011 census, Piedras Negras had a population of 379 inhabitants.

== Transportation ==
=== Road transportation ===
The district is covered by the following road routes:

- National Route 136
- National Route 316
