= Piedras Blancas, Aguada, Puerto Rico =

Barrio of Puerto Rico

Piedras Blancas
- Barrio
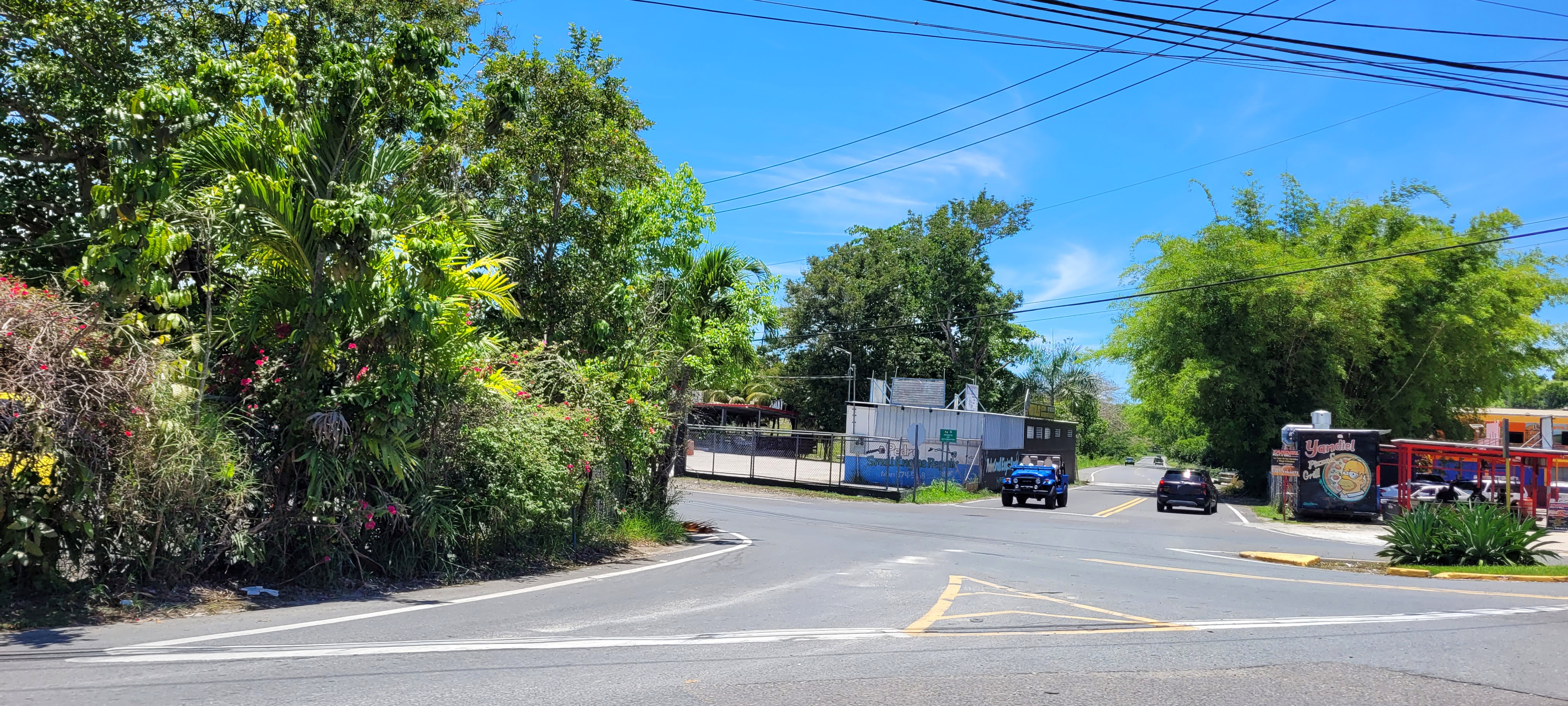
- Puerto Rico Highway 416 between Mal Paso and Piedras Blancas

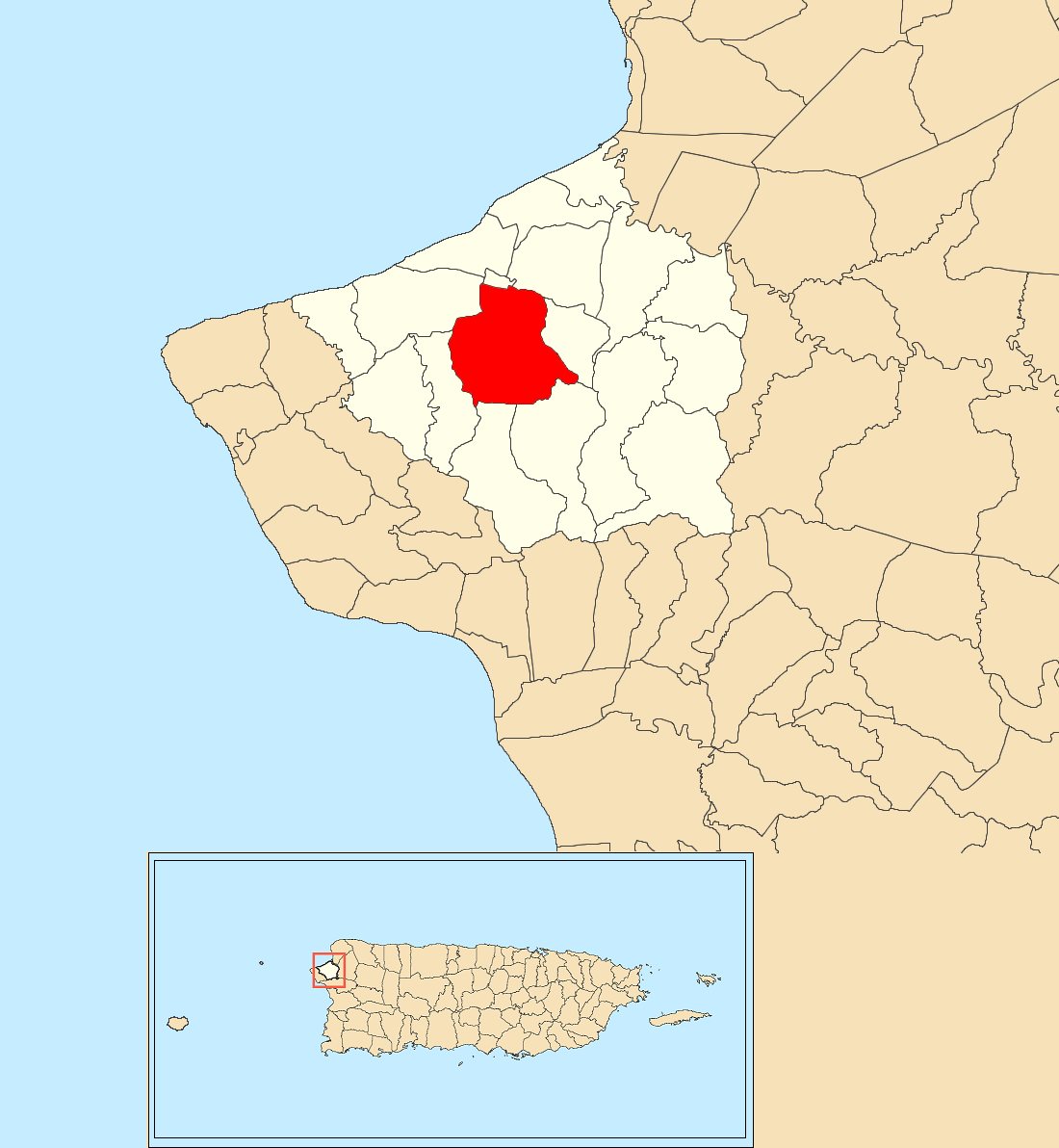
- Location of Piedras Blancas within the municipality of Aguada shown in red

- Location of Puerto Rico
- Coordinates: 18°21′47″N 67°11′10″W
- Commonwealth: Puerto Rico
- Municipality: Aguada

Area
  - Total: 2.80 sq mi (7.3 km^{2})
  - Land: 2.80 sq mi (7.3 km^{2})
  - Water: 0.00 sq mi (0 km^{2})
- Elevation: 79 ft (24 m)

Population (2010)
  - Total: 4,635
  - Density: 1,655.4/sq mi (639.2/km^{2})
- Source: 2010 Census
- Time zone: UTC−4 (AST)
- ZIP Code: 00602
- Area codes: 787, 939

Piedras Blancas is a barrio in the municipality of Aguada, Puerto Rico. Its population in 2010 was 4,635.

== History ==
Piedras Blancas was in Spain's gazetteers until Puerto Rico was ceded by Spain in the aftermath of the Spanish–American War under the terms of the Treaty of Paris of 1898 and became an unincorporated territory of the United States. In 1899, the United States Department of War conducted a census of Puerto Rico finding that the combined population of Piedras Blancas and Asomante barrio was 1,162.

Historical population
Census	Pop.	Note	%±
1910	912		—
1920	1,032		13.2%
1930	1,108		7.4%
1940	1,268		14.4%
1950	1,535		21.1%
1960	1,505		−2.0%
1970	0		−100.0%
1980	2,455		—
1990	2,813		14.6%
2000	3,542		25.9%
2010	4,635		30.9%
U.S. Decennial Census; 1900 (N/A) 1910-1930; 1930-1950 1960 1980-2000 2010

== Sectors ==
Barrios (which are, in contemporary times, roughly comparable to minor civil divisions) in turn are further subdivided into smaller local populated place areas/units called sectores (sectors in English). The types of sectores may vary, from normally sector to urbanización to reparto to barriada to residencial, among others.

The following sectors are in Piedras Blancas barrio:

Hogar Love and Care, Los González, Paseo Las Flores, Sector Bajura, Sector Cáceres, Sector Chuco Ramos, Sector Jiménez, Sector Juana Torres, Sector La Roca, Sector Los Matos, Sector Los Pinos, Sector Manolo Chaparro, Sector Parada Morales, Sector Pepe Rivera, Sector Pitirre, Sector Rufino Sánchez, Tramo Carretera 411, Urbanización Las Casonas, Urbanización Villa Ofelia, and Urbanización Villas de Sotomayor.

In Piedras Blancas barrio is part of the Aguada urban zone.

== See also ==
- List of communities in Puerto Rico
- List of barrios and sectors of Aguada, Puerto Rico
