= Mercedes Sur =

District in Puriscal canton, San José province, Costa Rica

- District
- Interactive map of Mercedes Sur
- Mercedes Sur district location in Costa Rica
- Coordinates: 9.768657°N 84.403633°W
- Country: Costa Rica
- Province: San José
- Canton: Puriscal

Area
  - Total: 183.58 km^{2} (70.88 sq mi)
- Elevation: 1,125 m (3,691 ft)

Population (2011)
  - Total: 5,866
  - Density: 31.95/km^{2} (82.76/sq mi)
- Time zone: UTC−06:00
- Postal code: 10402

Mercedes Sur is a district of the Puriscal canton, in the San José province of Costa Rica.

== Geography ==
Mercedes Sur has an area of 183.58 km^{2} and an elevation of 1,125 metres.

== Demographics ==
Historical population
Census	Pop.	±% p.a.
1883	439	—
1892	674	+4.88%
1927	4,139	+5.32%
1950	5,401	+1.16%
1963	9,324	+4.29%
1973	8,643	−0.76%
1984	3,576	−7.71%
2000	5,082	+2.22%
2011	5,866	+1.31%
2022	7,056	+1.69%
Source: Instituto Nacional de Estadística y Censos; Centro Centroamericano de Población

For the 2011 census, Mercedes Sur had a population of 5,866 inhabitants.

== Transportation ==
=== Road transportation ===
The district is covered by the following road routes:

- National Route 239
- National Route 317
- National Route 324
