= Parrita =

Canton in Puntarenas province, Costa Rica

- Canton and District
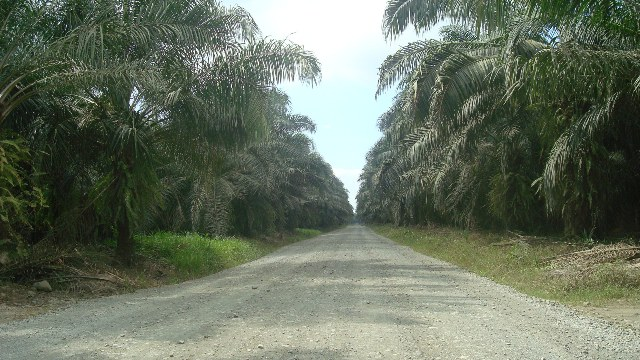
- African palm plantations in Parrita

- Flag
- Parrita canton
- Parrita canton location in Costa Rica
- Coordinates: 9.5471005°N 84.3464358°W
- Country: Costa Rica
- Province: Puntarenas
- Creation: 5 July 1971
- Head city: Parrita
- Districts: Districts: Parrita

Government
  - Type: Municipality
  - Body: Municipalidad de Parrita

Area
  - Total: 478.79 km^{2} (184.86 sq mi)
- Elevation: 4 m (13 ft)

Population (2011)
  - Total: 16,115
  - Density: 33.658/km^{2} (87.173/sq mi)
- Time zone: UTC−06:00
- Canton code: 609
- Website: muniparrita.go.cr

Parrita is a canton and its only district in the Puntarenas province of Costa Rica.

== Toponymy ==
The origin of the name, it is said, has to do with a woman named Rita who lived in one of the original settlements. Rita had a business and received packages. "Es pa' Rita" (It's for Rita) was often heard so the canton was called Parrita.

== History ==
Parrita was created on 5 July 1971 by decree 4787.

Almost all of Costa Rican territory was inhabited before the arrival of the Spanish. The Huetars lived in this area. In 1924, a young German installed the first banana plantation near the Pirrís River (also called the Parrita River) which encouraged migration of people from San José and Guanacaste.

== Geography ==
Parrita has an area of 478.79 km^{2} and a mean elevation of 4 metres.

The canton lies along the central Pacific coast between the mouths of the Tusubres River and Damas River. Inland the canton is delineated by a series of rivers that meander through the valleys of the coastal mountain range.

== Districts ==
The canton of Parrita is subdivided into only one district, occupying the same area as the whole canton:

1. Parrita, with postal code 60901

== Demographics ==
Historical population
Census	Pop.	±% p.a.
1973	11,901	—
1984	9,774	−1.77%
2000	12,112	+1.35%
2011	16,115	+2.63%
2022	20,068	+2.01%
Source: Instituto Nacional de Estadística y Censos; Centro Centroamericano de Población

According to the 2011 census, Parrita had a population of 16,115 inhabitants.

== Transportation ==
=== Road transportation ===
The canton is covered by the following road routes:

- National Route 34
- National Route 239
- National Route 301
- National Route 318
- National Route 607
- National Route 609
