= National Route 318 (Costa Rica) =

National Road Route in Costa Rica

National Tertiary Route 318
- Ruta nacional terciaria 318

Route information
- Maintained by Ministry of Public Works and Transport
- Length: 18.220 km (11.321 mi)

Location
- Country: Costa Rica
- Provinces: San José, Puntarenas

Highway system
- National Road Network of Costa Rica
| ← Route 317 | → Route 319 |

National Tertiary Route 318, or just Route 318 (Spanish: Ruta Nacional Terciaria 318, or Ruta 318) is a National Road Route of Costa Rica located in the San José and Puntarenas provinces.

== Description ==
In San José province the route covers Puriscal canton (Chires district).

In Puntarenas province the route covers Parrita canton (Parrita district).
