= Puerto Rico Highway 115 =

Highway in Puerto Rico

Highway 115
- Ruta 115
- Avenida Profesor Tomás Bonilla Feliciano

Route information
- Maintained by Puerto Rico DTPW
- Length: 27.8 km (17.3 mi)

Major junctions
- South end: PR-2 / PR-109 in Añasco Abajo
- PR-401 in Hatillo; PR-402 in Hatillo; PR-429 in Calvache; PR-412 in Rincón barrio-pueblo; PR-413 in Rincón barrio-pueblo; PR-414 in Guayabo; PR-411 / PR-441 in Guayabo–Guaniquilla; PR-417 in Aguada barrio-pueblo; PR-4415 in Asomante; PR-442 / PR-4439 in Carrizal
- North end: PR-1107 in Victoria

Location
- Country: United States
- Territory: Puerto Rico
- Municipalities: Añasco, Rincón, Aguada, Aguadilla

Highway system
- Roads in Puerto Rico; List
← PR-114	→ PR-116
← PR-111R	PR-115R	→ PR-116R

Puerto Rico Highway 115 (PR-115) is a highway which follows the west coastline of Puerto Rico from south Añasco at PR-2 to near downtown Aguadilla, where it becomes Puerto Rico Highway 111 after intersecting PR-2 again, and is the primary route to the town of Rincón, Puerto Rico, a tourist and frequent destination of surfers.

== Route description ==
As it enters Rincón, PR-115 becomes a divided highway with one lane per direction, with the median filled with trees, similar to some of the medians found in freeways in the United States. But PR-115 is not a freeway; it is a rural highway mostly one lane per direction. It enters toward downtown Rincón. The highway is subject to severe flooding when it rains.

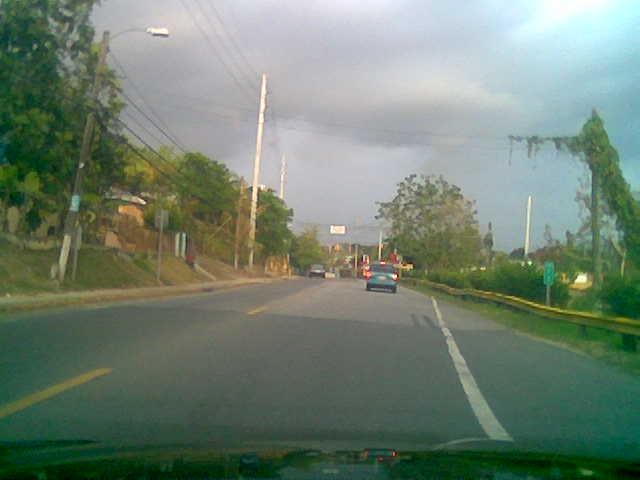
PR-115 in Aguada

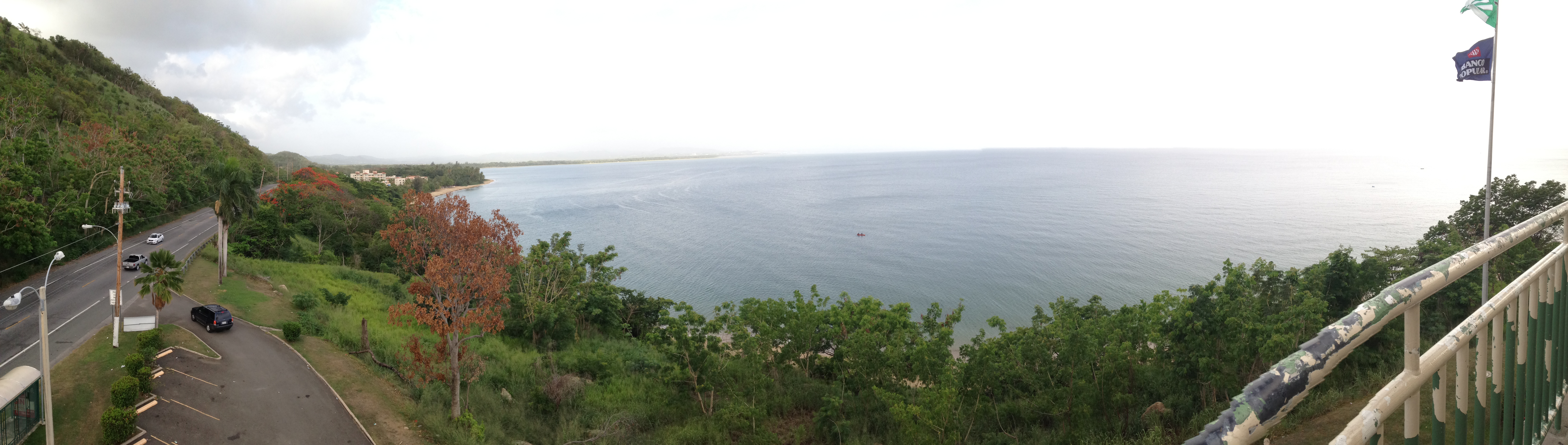
View from El Mirador de la Bahía in Caguabo off PR-115

== Major intersections ==
Municipality	Location	km	mi	Destinations	Notes
Añasco	Añasco Abajo	0.0	0.0	PR-109 east – Añasco	Continuation beyond PR-2
Añasco	Añasco Abajo	0.0	0.0	PR-2 (Expreso Rafael Hernández, "El Jibarito") – Mayagüez, Aguadilla	Southern terminus of PR-115 and western terminus of PR-109
Añasco	Hatillo	3.3	2.1	PR-401 – Playa	
Añasco	Hatillo	4.3	2.7	PR-402 – Hatillo	
Añasco	Caguabo	6.9	4.3	PR-429 – Barrero	
Rincón	Calvache	8.7	5.4	PR-411 – Calvache	
Rincón	Calvache	10.3	6.4	PR-429 – Córcega	
Rincón	Rincón barrio-pueblo	13.2	8.2	PR-412 (Calle Comercio) – Pueblo	One-way street
Rincón	Rincón barrio-pueblo	13.3– 13.4	8.3– 8.3	PR-414 (Calle Sol) – Cruces	
Rincón	Rincón barrio-pueblo	13.6	8.5	PR-413 (Camino Carretas) – Puntas	
Rincón	Río Grande	15.4	9.6	PR-413 (Camino Carretas) – Puntas	
Rincón	Río Grande	17.2	10.7	PR-400 – Cruces	
Aguada	Guayabo	20.4	12.7	PR-414 – Cruces	
Aguada	Guaniquilla–Guayabo line	21.8	13.5	PR-Avenida Nativo Alers – Aguada	
Aguada	Guaniquilla–Guayabo line	22.6– 22.7	14.0– 14.1	PR-411 / PR-441 – Piedras Blancas, Guaniquilla	PR-441 access via Calle Jiménez
Aguada	Aguada barrio-pueblo	23.2– 23.3	14.4– 14.5	PR-417 east (Calle Guamá) – Mal Paso	One-way street
Aguada	Asomante	24.6	15.3	PR-4415 – Mal Paso	Former PR-115R
Aguada	Asomante	25.9	16.1	PR-439 – Asomante	
Aguada	Carrizal	26.8	16.7	PR-439 – Carrizal	
Aguada	Río Culebrinas	26.8– 26.9	16.7– 16.7	Puente Conde de Caspe	
Aguada	Espinar	27.1	16.8	PR-442 / PR-4439 – Espinar	
Aguadilla	Victoria	27.8	17.3	PR-1107 (Avenida Victoria) – Aguadilla, Moca	Northern terminus of PR-115
1.000 mi = 1.609 km; 1.000 km = 0.621 mi: Incomplete access

== Related route ==
Highway 115 Spur
- Location: Aguada
- Length: 1.2 km (0.75 mi)
- Existed: y

Highway 115 Spur (Spanish: Carretera Ramal 115, abbreviated Ramal PR-115 or PR-115R) is a road that branches off from PR-115 to PR-417 near downtown Aguada. Currently the entire road was renumbered to PR-4415. The entire route is located in Aguada.

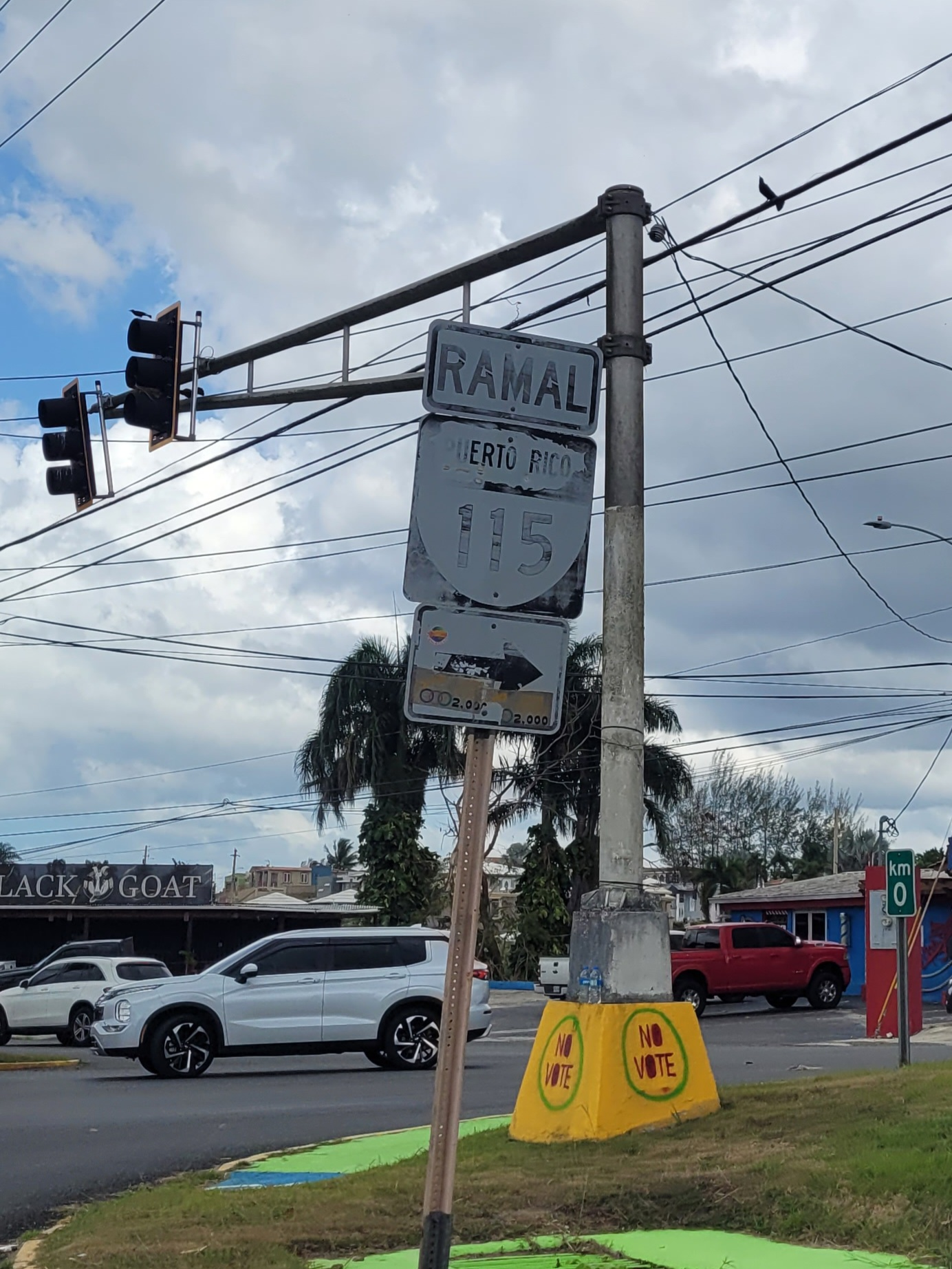
PR-115 north at PR-115R intersection

Location	km	mi	Destinations	Notes
Piedras Blancas–Asomante line	1.2	0.75	PR-417 – Aguada	Southern terminus of PR-115R
Asomante	0.0	0.0	PR-115 – Aguadilla	Northern terminus of PR-115R
1.000 mi = 1.609 km; 1.000 km = 0.621 mi
