= Puerto Rico Highway 107 =

Highway in Puerto Rico

Highway 107
- Ruta 107
- Carretera Pedro Albizu Campos

Route information
- Maintained by Puerto Rico DTPW
- Length: 4.5 km (2.8 mi)

Major junctions
- South end: PR-2 in Caimital Bajo
- PR-1107 in Caimital Bajo–Camaceyes; PR-467 in Borinquen; PR-458 in Borinquen; PR-4467 in Borinquen–Camaceyes
- North end: Borinquen Road in Borinquen–Camaceyes

Location
- Country: United States
- Territory: Puerto Rico
- Municipalities: Aguadilla

Highway system
- Roads in Puerto Rico; List
← PR-106	→ PR-108
← PR-999	PR-1107	→ PR-1111

Puerto Rico Highway 107 (PR-107), or Carretera Pedro Albizu Campos, is a north–south highway located in Aguadilla, Puerto Rico. It extends from PR-2 to Ramey Air Force Base.

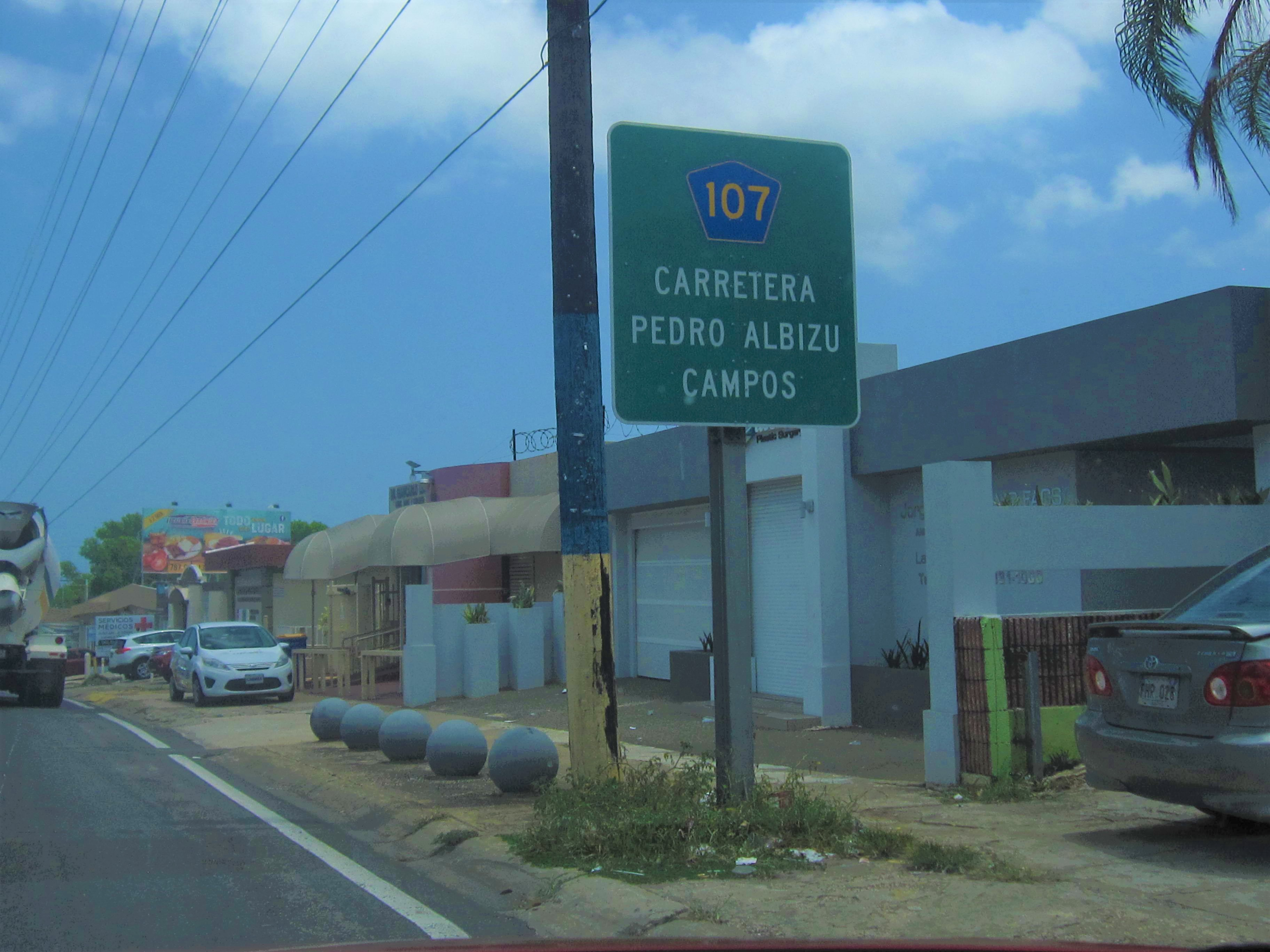
Puerto Rico Highway 107 north near Crash Boat Beach

== Major intersections ==
The entire route is located in Aguadilla.

Location	km	mi	Destinations	Notes
Caimital Bajo	0.0	0.0	PR-2 – Arecibo, San Juan, Mayagüez	Southern terminus of PR-107
Caimital Bajo–Camaceyes line	0.1– 0.2	0.062– 0.12	PR-1107 south (Avenida John F. Kennedy)	Northern terminus of PR-1107 (former PR-111); access to Aguadilla Centro
Camaceyes–Borinquen line	0.5– 0.6	0.31– 0.37	To PR-1107	Access to Aguadilla Centro
Borinquen	0.9	0.56	PR-467 – Camaceyes	Clockwise terminus of PR-467
Borinquen	1.9– 2.0	1.2– 1.2	PR-458 – Crash Boat Beach	Eastern terminus of PR-458
Borinquen–Camaceyes line	4.1	2.5	PR-4467 – Malezas	Western terminus of PR-4467
Borinquen–Camaceyes line	4.5	2.8	Ramey Air Force Base (Borinquen Road)	Northern terminus of PR-107
1.000 mi = 1.609 km; 1.000 km = 0.621 mi: Route transition

== Related route ==
Highway 1107
- Location: Aguadilla
- Length: 6.3 km (3.9 mi)

Puerto Rico Highway 1107 (PR-1107) is a north–south spur route that connects PR-107 with downtown Aguadilla. This highways extends from PR-107 between Camaceyes and Caimital Bajo barrios until its end at PR-2 and PR-111 in Victoria. This highway was part of PR-111 and is designated as Carretera Doctor Gregorio Igartúa Acevedo. The entire route is located in Aguadilla.

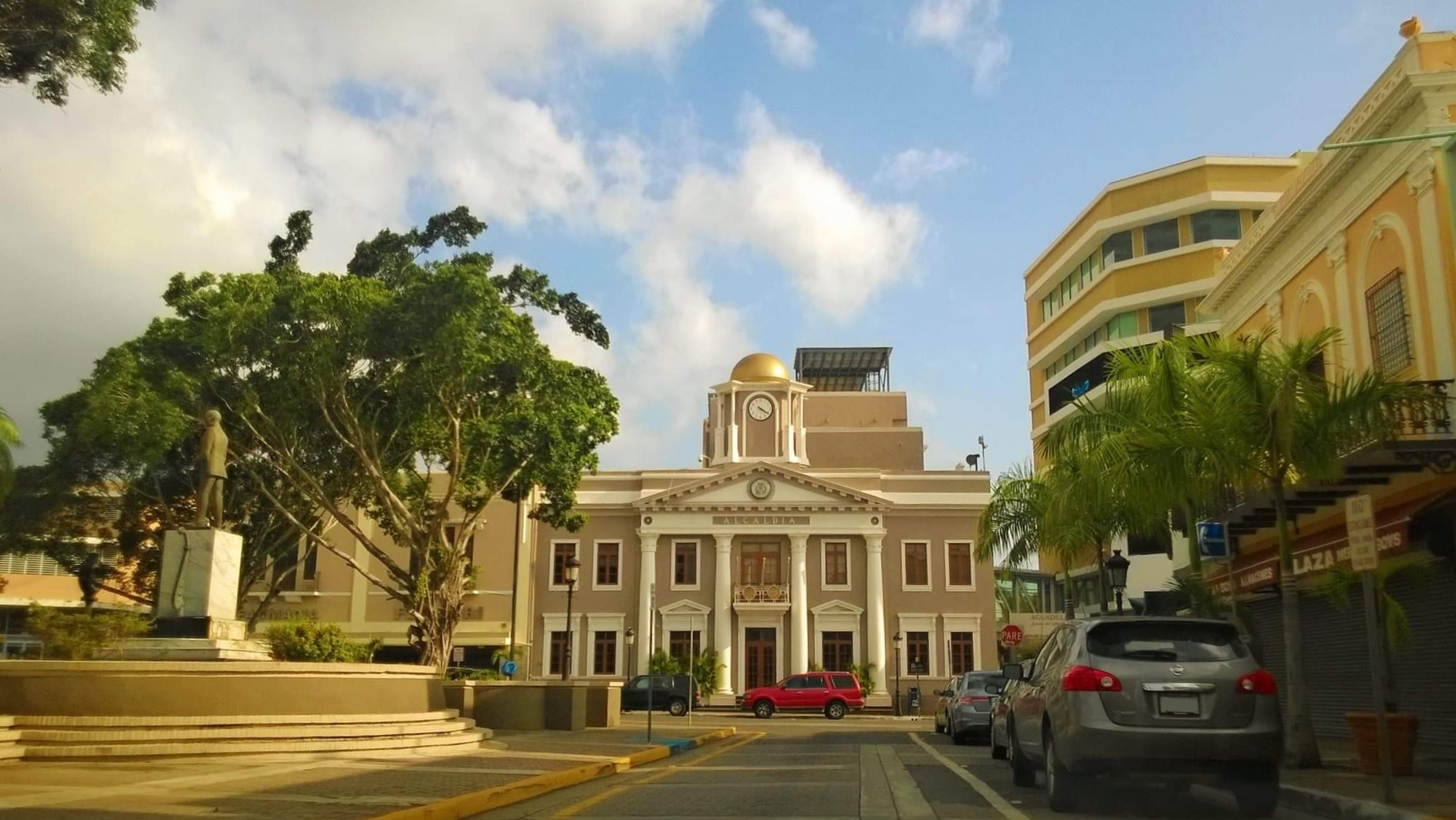
PR-1107 south in downtown Aguadilla

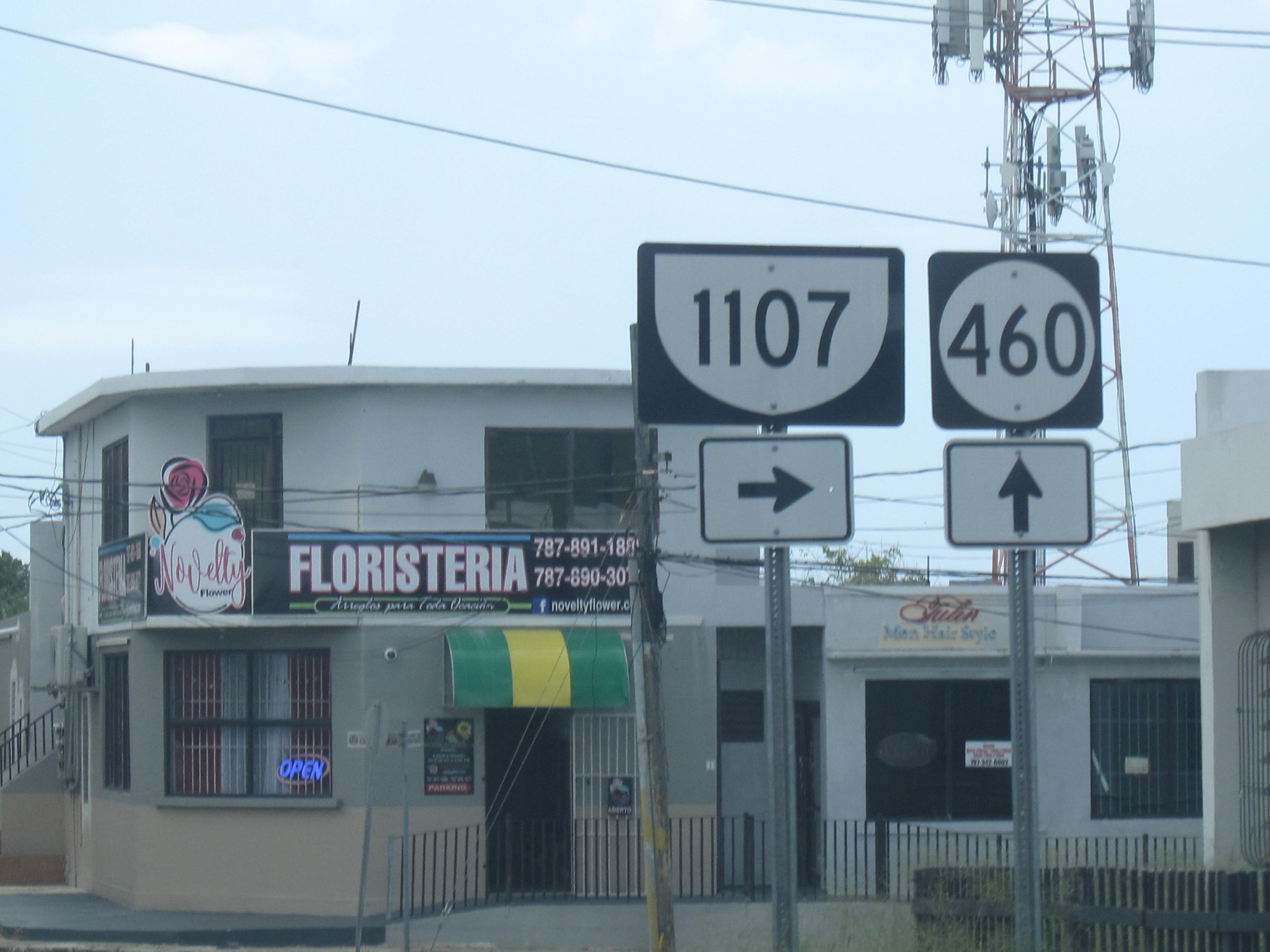
PR-1107 south at PR-460 intersection between Camaceyes and Caimital Bajo barrios

Location	km	mi	Destinations	Notes
Victoria	6.3	3.9	PR-111 east – Moca, San Sebastián	Continuation beyond PR-2
Victoria	6.3	3.9	PR-2 – Añasco, Mayagüez, Arecibo	Partial cloverleaf interchange; southern terminus of PR-1107 and western terminus of PR-111
Victoria	6.2– 6.1	3.9– 3.8	PR-418	Northern terminus of PR-418
Victoria	6.0	3.7	PR-4439	Northern terminus of PR-4439
Victoria	5.9	3.7	PR-115 – Aguada, Rincón	Northern terminus of PR-115
Aguadilla barrio-pueblo	4.0	2.5	PR-4440	Northern terminus of PR-4440
Aguadilla barrio-pueblo	3.8	2.4	PR-4442	Northern terminus of PR-4442; unsigned
Aguadilla barrio-pueblo	3.6	2.2	PR-440 north	Southern terminus of PR-440
Aguadilla barrio-pueblo	3.1– 3.0	1.9– 1.9	PR-249 (Avenida San Carlos)	Former PR-2R
Aguadilla barrio-pueblo	2.8– 2.7	1.7– 1.7	PR-440 south	Northern terminus of PR-440
Aguadilla barrio-pueblo	2.2	1.4	PR-460	Southern terminus of PR-460
Aguadilla barrio-pueblo–Camaceyes– Borinquen tripoint	1.7– 1.6	1.1– 0.99	PR-4458	Southern terminus of PR-4458
Camaceyes–Caimital Bajo line	0.3– 0.2	0.19– 0.12	PR-460	Northern terminus of PR-460
Camaceyes–Caimital Bajo line	0.0	0.0	PR-107 (Avenida Doctor Pedro Albizu Campos) to PR-2	Northern terminus of PR-1107; access to Arecibo, San Juan, Mayagüez and Ramey Air Force Base
1.000 mi = 1.609 km; 1.000 km = 0.621 mi

== See also ==
- Pedro Albizu Campos
