= Stella, Puerto Rico =

Community of Rincón, Puerto Rico

Stella Stella comunidad
- Community
- Location within Puerto Rico
- Coordinates: 18°19′23″N 67°14′50″W
- Commonwealth: Puerto Rico
- Municipality: Rincón

Area
  - Total: 0.46 sq mi (1.2 km^{2})
  - Land: 0.33 sq mi (0.85 km^{2})
  - Water: 0.13 sq mi (0.34 km^{2})
- Elevation: 7 ft (2.1 m)

Population (2010)
  - Total: 1,088
  - Density: 3,297/sq mi (1,273/km^{2})
- Source: 2010 Census
- Time zone: UTC−4 (AST)
- ZIP Code: 00677
- Area code: 787/939

Stella (Stella comunidad) is a community in Pueblo barrio and Calvache barrio, in the municipality of Rincón, Puerto Rico. Its population in 2010 was 1,088.

Historical population
Census	Pop.	Note	%±
1970	0		—
1980	1,020		—
1990	1,071		5.0%
2000	971		−9.3%
2010	1,088		12.0%
U.S. Decennial Census; 1899 (shown as 1900) 1910-1930; 1930-1950 1980-2000 2010

== See also ==
- List of communities in Puerto Rico
- List of barrios and sectors of Rincón, Puerto Rico
