= Puerto Rico Highway 413 =

Highway in Puerto Rico

Highway 413
- Ruta 413
- Camino Carretas

Route information
- Maintained by Puerto Rico DTPW
- Length: 6.1 km (3.8 mi)

Major junctions
- CW end: PR-115 in Rincón barrio-pueblo
- PR-4413 in Puntas
- CCW end: PR-115 in Río Grande

Location
- Country: United States
- Territory: Puerto Rico
- Municipalities: Rincón

Highway system
- Roads in Puerto Rico; List
← PR-385	→ PR-438
← PR-4128	PR-4413	→ PR-5139

Puerto Rico Highway 413 (PR-413) is a rural road located at the west point of Rincón, Puerto Rico, and is famous in the island for being the main access to beaches near Tres Palmas and the Rincón Lighthouse, where local and international surfing tournaments take place. It is named the Road to Happiness. This highway begins near PR-115 in downtown Rincón, near the west end of Ensenada barrio. Then it passes through Puntas barrio and ends at PR-115, near the south end of Río Grande barrio, heading to Aguada, Puerto Rico.

Puerto Rico Highway 413

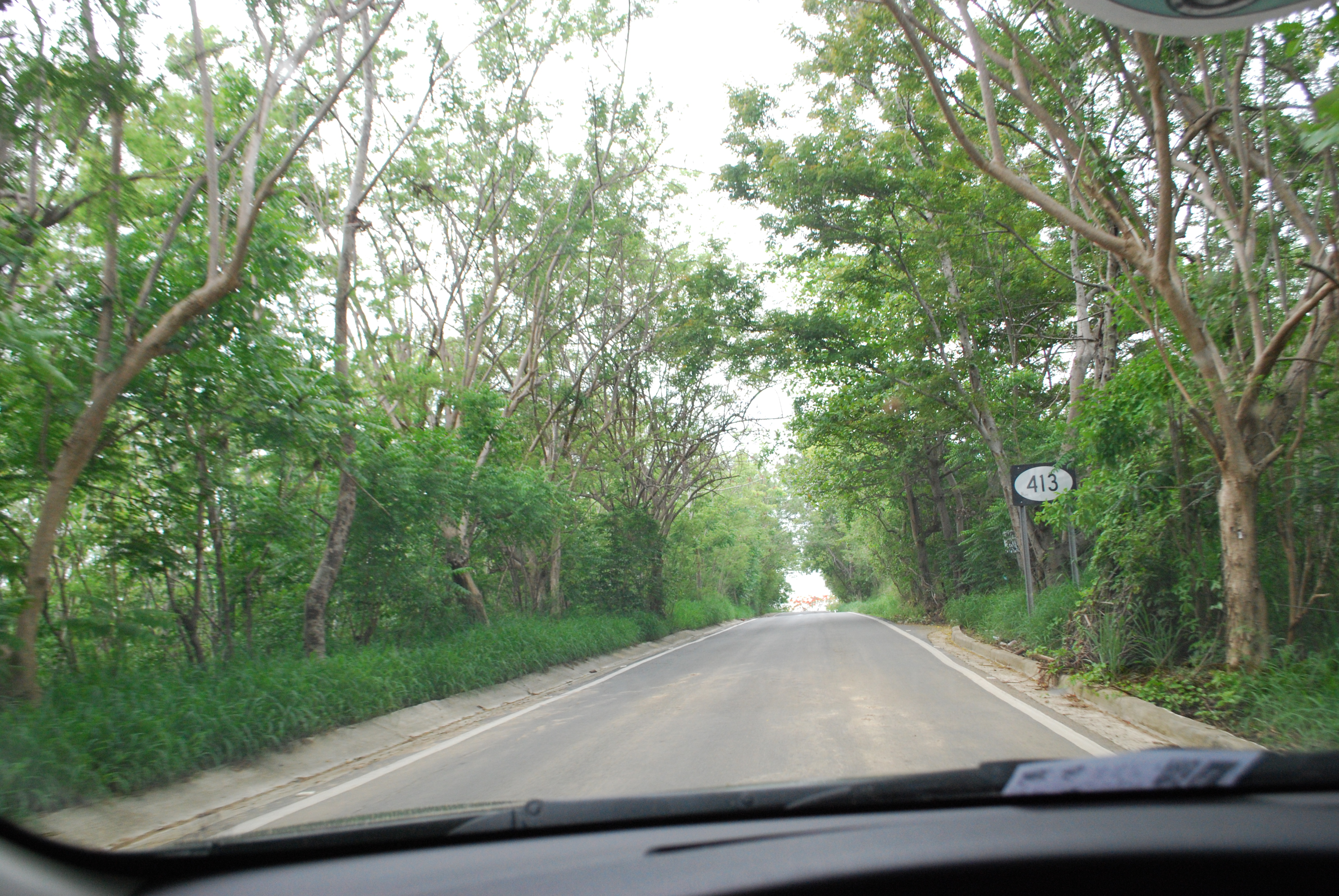
Heading towards Aguada in Puntas barrio after the entrance to Punta Higuero Light

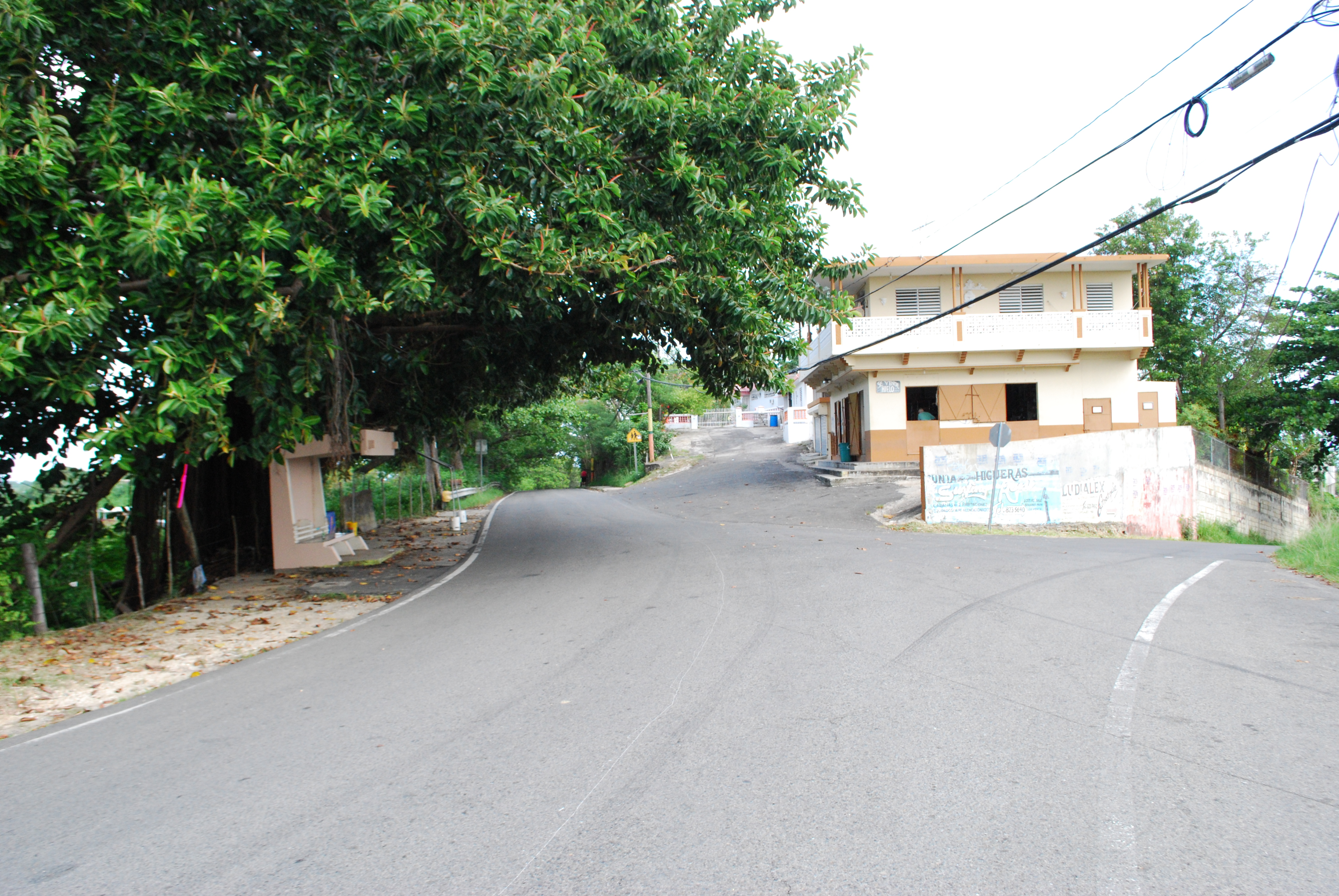
Heading west in Puntas barrio

== Major intersections ==
The entire route is located in Rincón.

Location	km	mi	Destinations	Notes
Rincón barrio-pueblo	0.0	0.0	PR-115 (Avenida Profesor Tomás Bonilla Feliciano) – Aguadilla, Mayagüez	Clockwise terminus of PR-413
Puntas	2.5	1.6	PR-4413 – Punta Higuero Light	Domes Beach
Río Grande	6.1	3.8	PR-115 (Avenida Profesor Tomás Bonilla Feliciano) – Rincón, Aguada	Counterclockwise terminus of PR-413
1.000 mi = 1.609 km; 1.000 km = 0.621 mi

== Related route ==
Highway 4413
- Location: Rincón
- Length: 1.0 km (0.62 mi)

Puerto Rico Highway 4413 (PR-4413) is a spur route located in Rincón. It extends from PR-413 to Domes Beach near Punta Higuero Light. The entire route is located in Puntas, Rincón.

km	mi	Destinations	Notes
0.0	0.0	PR-413 – Rincón	Southern terminus of PR-4413
1.0	0.62	Northern terminus of PR-4413 at Domes Beach; dead end road	
1.000 mi = 1.609 km; 1.000 km = 0.621 mi
