= Río Grande, Rincón, Puerto Rico =

Barrio of Puerto Rico

Río Grande
- Barrio
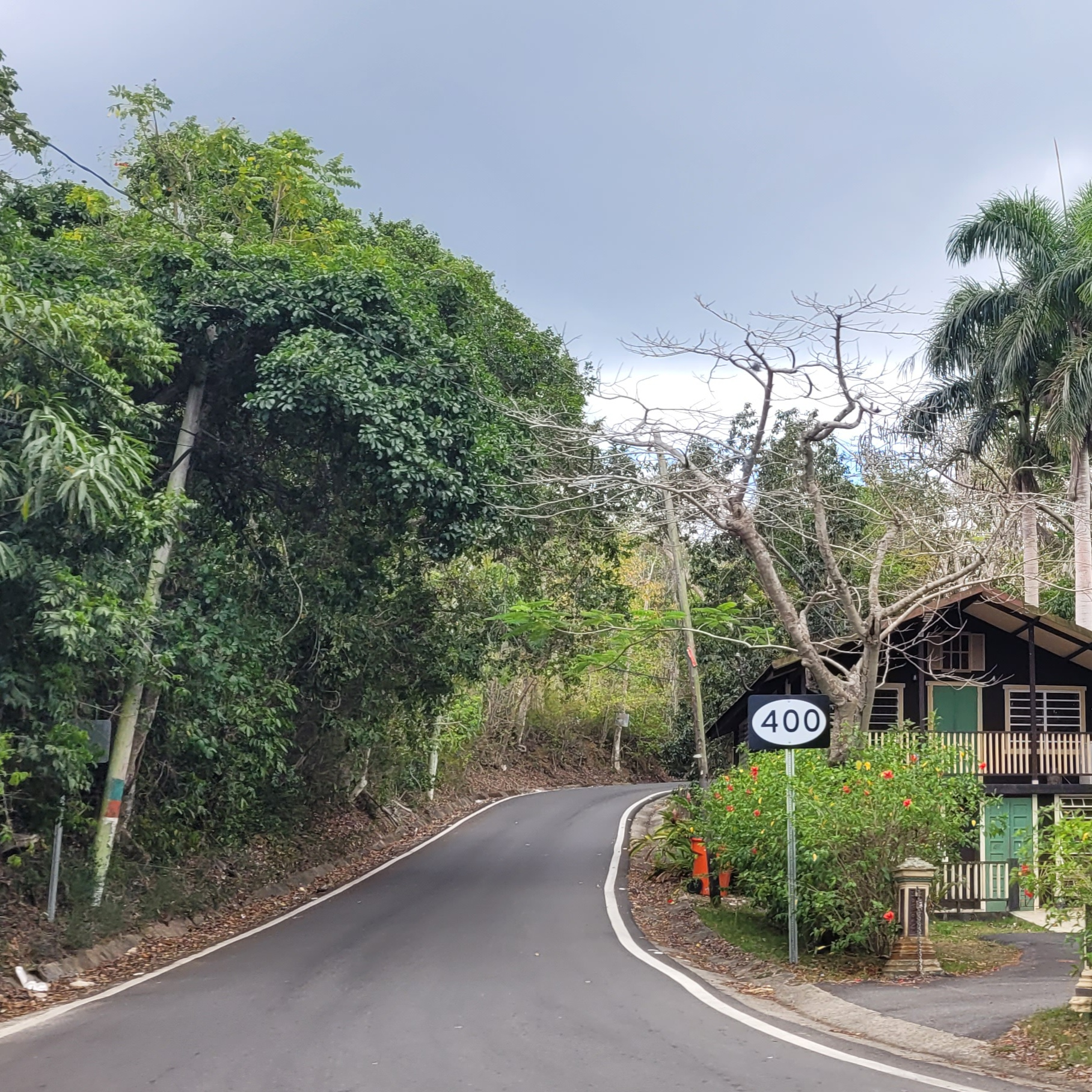
- Puerto Rico Highway 400 in Río Grande

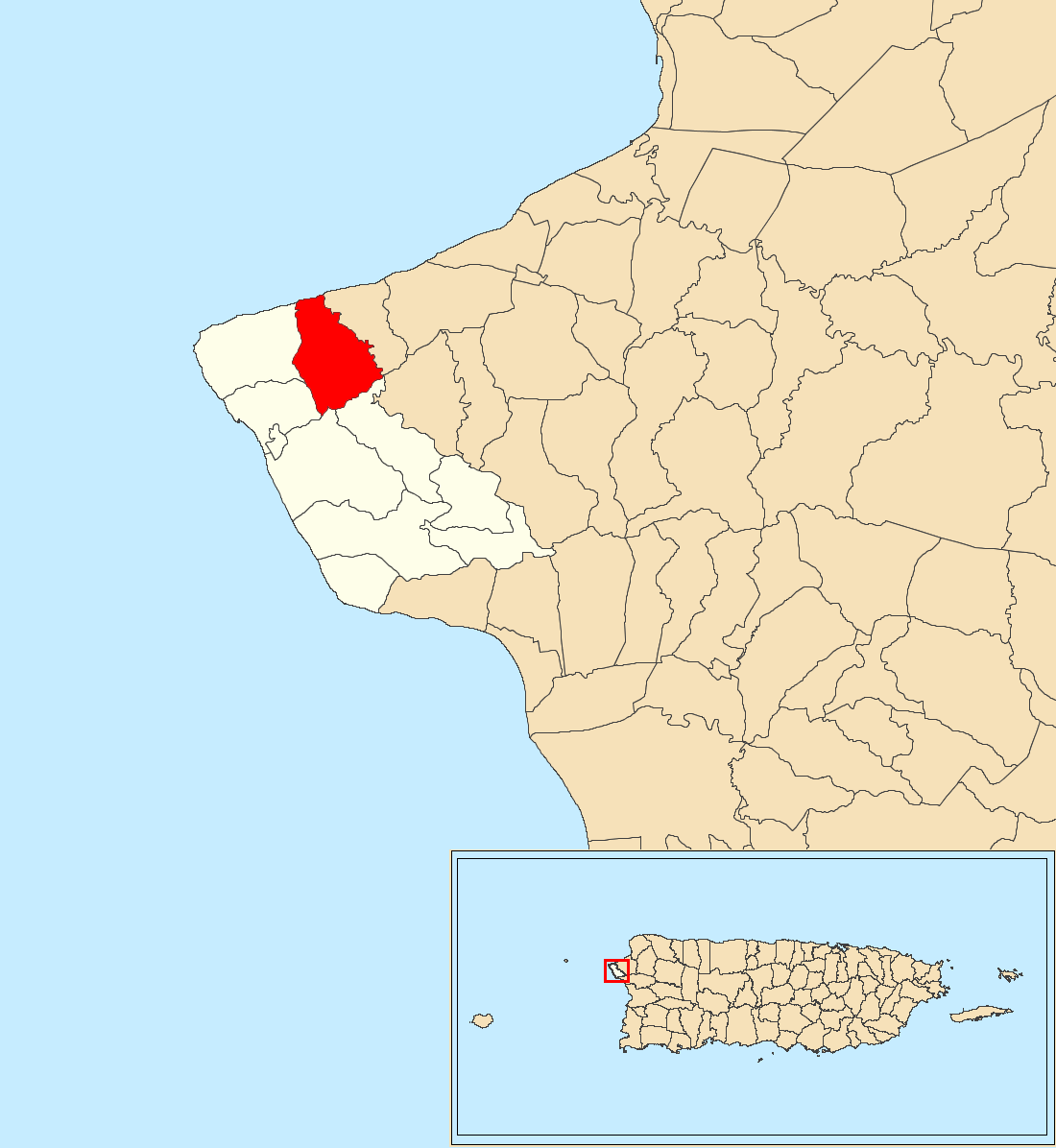
- Location of Río Grande within the municipality of Rincón shown in red

- Location of Puerto Rico
- Coordinates: 18°21′50″N 67°14′07″W
- Commonwealth: Puerto Rico
- Municipality: Rincón

Area
  - Total: 1.80 sq mi (4.7 km^{2})
  - Land: 1.71 sq mi (4.4 km^{2})
  - Water: 0.09 sq mi (0.23 km^{2})
- Elevation: 33 ft (10 m)

Population (2010)
  - Total: 1,187
  - Density: 694.2/sq mi (268.0/km^{2})
- Source: 2010 Census
- Time zone: UTC−4 (AST)
- ZIP Code: 00677
- Area code: 787/939

Río Grande is a barrio in the municipality of Rincón, Puerto Rico. Its population in 2010 was 1,187.

== History ==
Río Grande was in Spain's gazetteers until Puerto Rico was ceded by Spain in the aftermath of the Spanish–American War under the terms of the Treaty of Paris of 1898 and became an unincorporated territory of the United States. In 1899, the United States Department of War conducted a census of Puerto Rico finding that the population of Río Grande barrio was 676.

Historical population
Census	Pop.	Note	%±
1900	676		—
1910	728		7.7%
1920	801		10.0%
1930	809		1.0%
1940	902		11.5%
1950	943		4.5%
1960	742		−21.3%
1970	666		−10.2%
1980	962		44.4%
1990	1,010		5.0%
2000	1,191		17.9%
2010	1,187		−0.3%
U.S. Decennial Census; 1899 (shown as 1900) 1910-1930; 1930-1950 1980-2000 2010

== Sectors ==
Barrios (which are, in contemporary times, roughly comparable to minor civil divisions) in turn are further subdivided into smaller local populated place areas/units called sectores (sectors in English). The types of sectores may vary, from normally sector to urbanización to reparto to barriada to residencial, among others.

The following sectors are in Río Grande barrio:

Carretera 115, Carretera 400, Carretera 413, Carretera 414 (Camino Mortero), Sector Arizona, Sector Cuchillo de Piñas, Sector Domingo Vargas, Sector Lomas Los Gavilanes, Sector Los Mangoes, Sector Mingo Mela, Sector Moreno, Sector Pedro Rosado, Urbanización Estancias de Río Grande, Urbanización Palma Real, Urbanización Punta del Mar Beach Village, and Urbanización Veredas de Río Grande.

== See also ==
- List of communities in Puerto Rico
- List of barrios and sectors of Rincón, Puerto Rico
