= Guaniquilla, Aguada, Puerto Rico =

Barrio of Puerto Rico

Guaniquilla
- Barrio
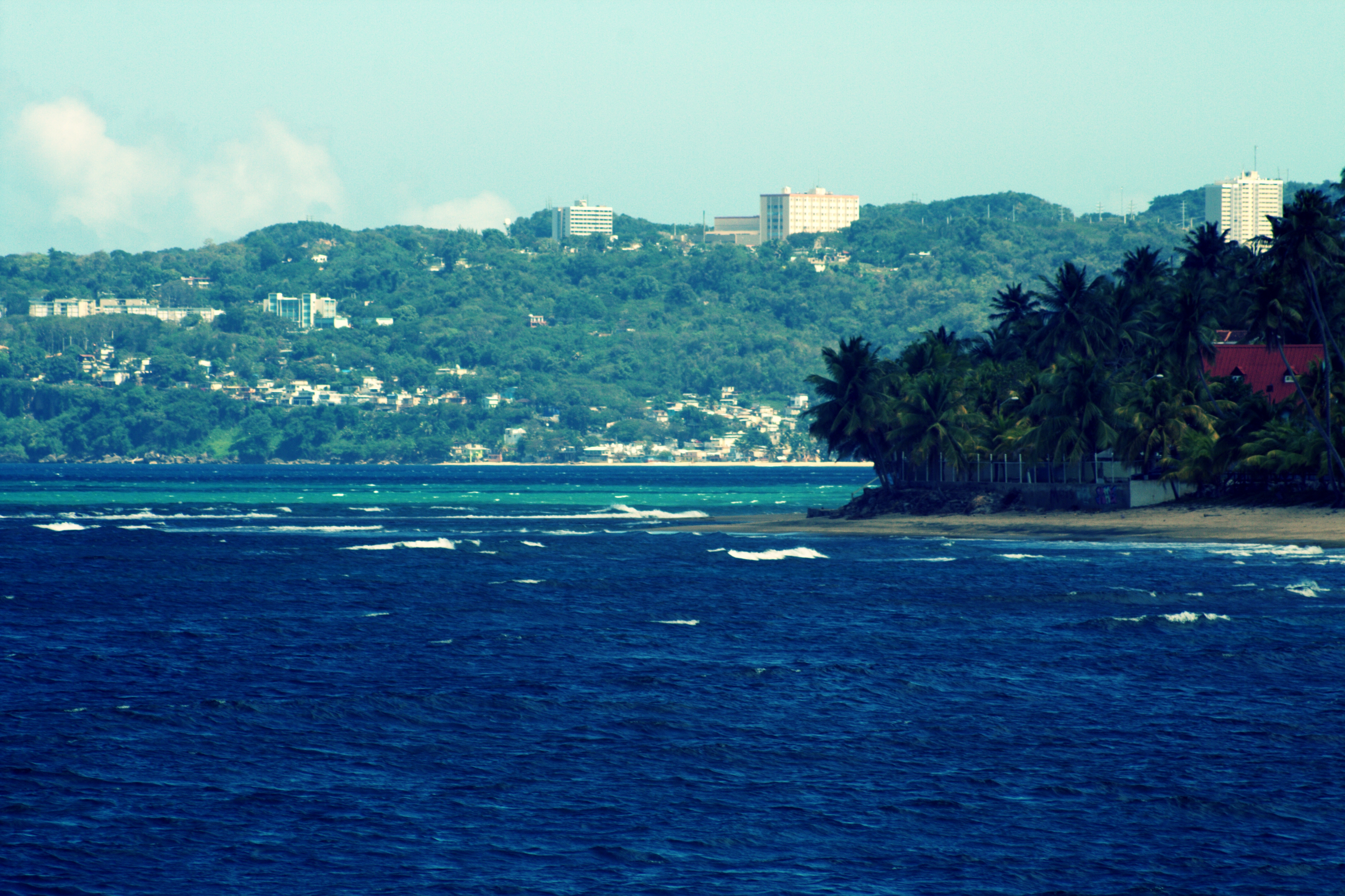
- Guaniquilla, Aguada and Aguadilla

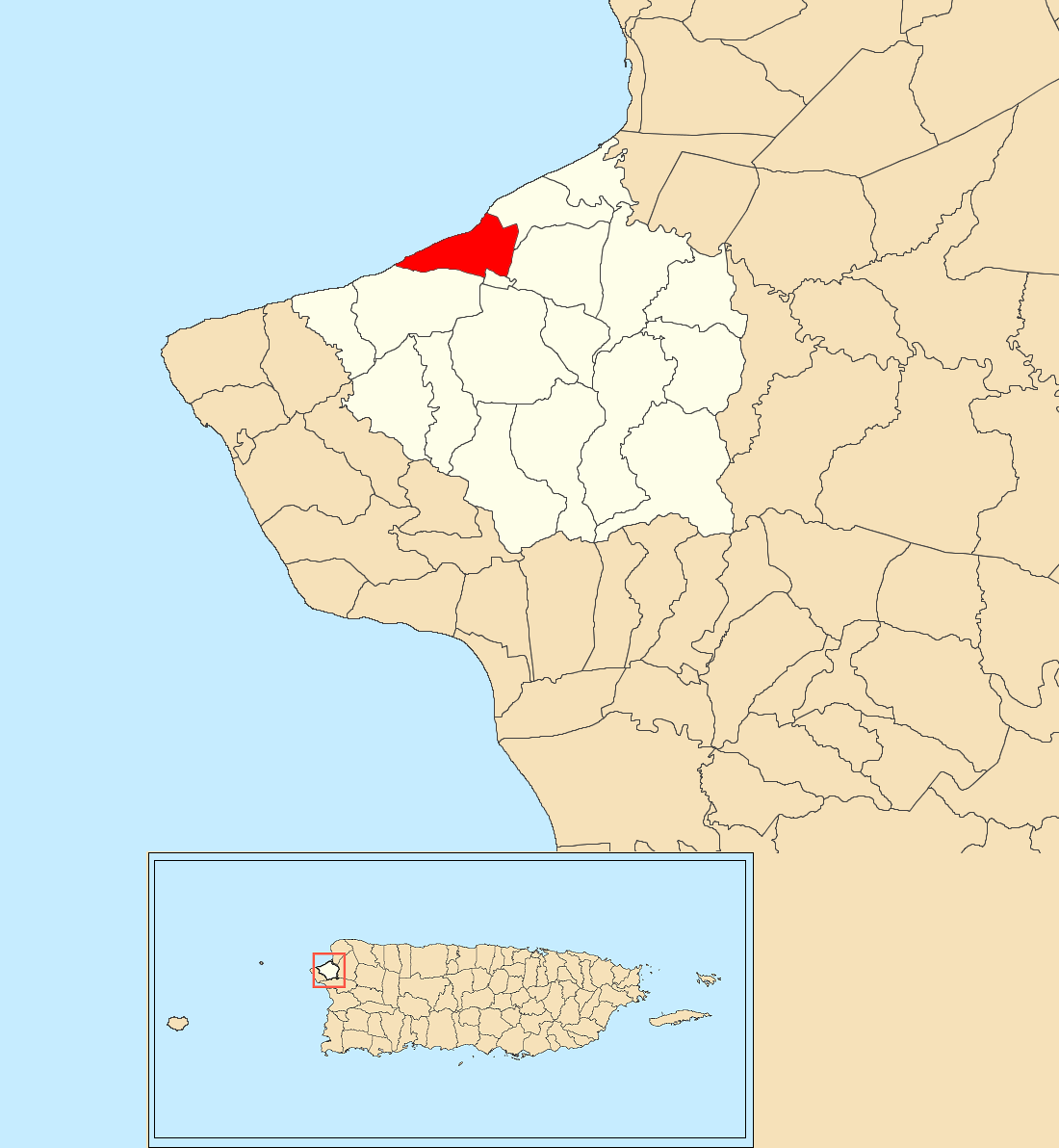
- Location of Guaniquilla within the municipality of Aguada shown in red

- Location of Puerto Rico
- Coordinates: 18°23′22″N 67°11′49″W
- Commonwealth: Puerto Rico
- Municipality: Aguada

Area
  - Total: 1.59 sq mi (4.1 km^{2})
  - Land: 1.11 sq mi (2.9 km^{2})
  - Water: 0.48 sq mi (1.2 km^{2})
- Elevation: 3 ft (0.91 m)

Population (2010)
  - Total: 2,663
  - Density: 2,420.9/sq mi (934.7/km^{2})
- Source: 2010 Census
- Time zone: UTC−4 (AST)
- ZIP Code: 00602
- Area codes: 787, 939

Guaniquilla is a coastal barrio in the municipality of Aguada, Puerto Rico. Its population in 2010 was 2,663.

== Features ==
Pico de Piedra beach and Guayabo River are located in Guaniquilla where an annual festival is held around June 24.

== History ==
Guaniquilla was in Spain's gazetteers until Puerto Rico was ceded by Spain in the aftermath of the Spanish–American War under the terms of the Treaty of Paris of 1898 and became an unincorporated territory of the United States. In 1899, the United States Department of War conducted a census of Puerto Rico finding that the combined population of Rosario (not a current barrio of Aguada), California (not a current barrio of Aguada) and Guaniquilla (spelled Guaniquilla) barrios was 1,135.

Historical population
Census	Pop.	Note	%±
1910	350		—
1920	303		−13.4%
1930	371		22.4%
1940	503		35.6%
1950	746		48.3%
1960	1,049		40.6%
1970	0		−100.0%
1980	1,940		—
1990	2,611		34.6%
2000	2,846		9.0%
2010	2,663		−6.4%
U.S. Decennial Census; 1900 (N/A) 1910-1930; 1930-1950 1960 1980-2000 2010

== Sectors ==
Barrios (which are, in contemporary times, roughly comparable to minor civil divisions) in turn are further subdivided into smaller local populated place areas/units called sectores (sectors in English). The types of sectores may vary, from normally sector to urbanización to reparto to barriada to residencial, among others.

The following sectors are in Guaniquilla barrio:

Apartamentos Aguada Elderly, Apartamentos Villarena Resort, Calle Estación, Urbanización Montemar, Condominio Bahía Azul, Condominio Elderly Apartments, Extensión Los Robles, Parcelas Palmar Novoa, Reparto González, Reparto Los Maestros, Reparto Minerva, Residencial Los Robles, Reparto Hernández, Sector Casualidad, Sector Jaguey, Sector Pico de Piedra, Sector Pitusa o Tramo Carretera 115, Sector Tosquero, Sector Valle del Atlántico, Sector Villa Santoni, Tramo Carretera 441, Urbanización Alturas de Aguada, Urbanización Isabel La Católica, and Urbanización Pública Francisco Egipciaco.

In Guaniquilla barrio is part of the Aguada urban zone.

== See also ==
- List of communities in Puerto Rico
- List of barrios and sectors of Aguada, Puerto Rico
