= Calvache =

Barrio of Rincón, Puerto Rico

- Barrio
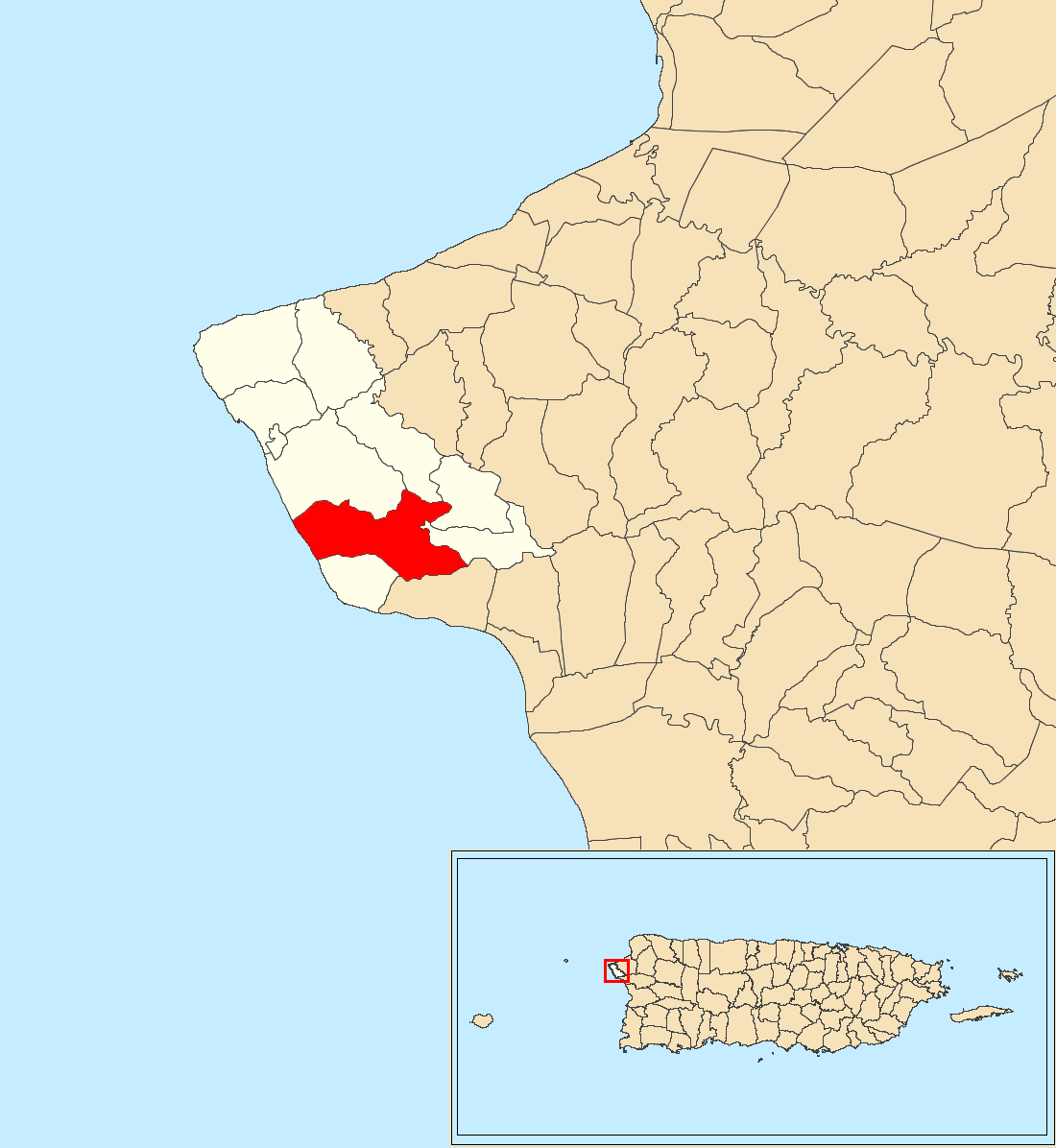
- Location of Calvache within the municipality of Rincón shown in red

- Location of Puerto Rico
- Coordinates: 18°19′06″N 67°13′40″W
- Commonwealth: Puerto Rico
- Municipality: Rincón

Area
  - Total: 2.41 sq mi (6.2 km^{2})
  - Land: 2.33 sq mi (6.0 km^{2})
  - Water: 0.08 sq mi (0.21 km^{2})
- Elevation: 49 ft (15 m)

Population (2010)
  - Total: 2,222
  - Density: 953.6/sq mi (368.2/km^{2})
- Source: 2010 Census
- Time zone: UTC−4 (AST)
- ZIP Code: 00677
- Area code: 787/939

Calvache is a barrio in the municipality of Rincón, Puerto Rico. Its population in 2010 was 2,222.

== History ==
Calvache was in Spain's gazetteers until Puerto Rico was ceded by Spain in the aftermath of the Spanish–American War under the terms of the Treaty of Paris of 1898 and became an unincorporated territory of the United States. In 1899, the United States Department of War conducted a census of Puerto Rico finding that the population of Calvache barrio was 708.

Historical population
| Census | Pop. | Note | %± |
|---|---|---|---|
| 1900 | 708 | | — |
| 1910 | 910 | | 28.5% |
| 1920 | 711 | | −21.9% |
| 1930 | 902 | | 26.9% |
| 1940 | 1,158 | | 28.4% |
| 1950 | 1,299 | | 12.2% |
| 1960 | 1,273 | | −2.0% |
| 1970 | 1,058 | | −16.9% |
| 1980 | 1,519 | | 43.6% |
| 1990 | 1,543 | | 1.6% |
| 2000 | 2,169 | | 40.6% |
| 2010 | 2,222 | | 2.4% |
U.S. Decennial Census; 1899 (shown as 1900) 1910-1930; 1930-1950 1980-2000 2010

== Sectors ==
Barrios (which are, in contemporary times, roughly comparable to minor civil divisions) in turn are further subdivided into smaller local populated place areas/units called sectores (sectors in English). The types of sectores may vary, from normally sector to urbanización to reparto to barriada to residencial, among others. Part of the Stella community is in Calvache.

The following sectors are in Calvache barrio:

Acres de Córcega, Calle Ajacio, Calle Bastia, Calle Caleta Los Frailes, Calle Calvi, Calle Corte, Calle El Cielo, Calle Invierno, Calle La Moca, Calle Occhiatanna, Calle Otoño, Calle Poggio Doletta, Calle Porto Vecchio, Calle Primavera, Calle Puesta del Sol, Calle Rue de Córsica, Calle Verano, Carretera 115, Carretera 411, Comunidad Agrícola Bianchi, Comunidad Calvache, Condominio Córcega Apartments, Condominio Costa Córcega, Condominio Las Coronas, Condominio Los Almendros, Condominio Pelican Reef, Condominio Rincón Ocean Club I y II, Condominio Victoria del Mar, Cruces Nuevas, Sector Benito González, Sector Campo Alegre, Sector Córcega, Sector El Salto (El Último Brinco), Sector Hacienda Juanita, Sector La Jalda o Camino Anselmo, Sector Las Lomas, Sector Los Muelles, Sector Palatine Hill, Sector Pico Carrero, Sector Toño Olán and Urbanización Valle Escondido.

== See also ==
- List of communities in Puerto Rico
- List of barrios and sectors of Rincón, Puerto Rico
