= Aguada barrio-pueblo =

Historical and administrative center (seat) of Aguada, Puerto Rico

Aguada barrio-pueblo Pueblo de Aguada
- Municipality Seat
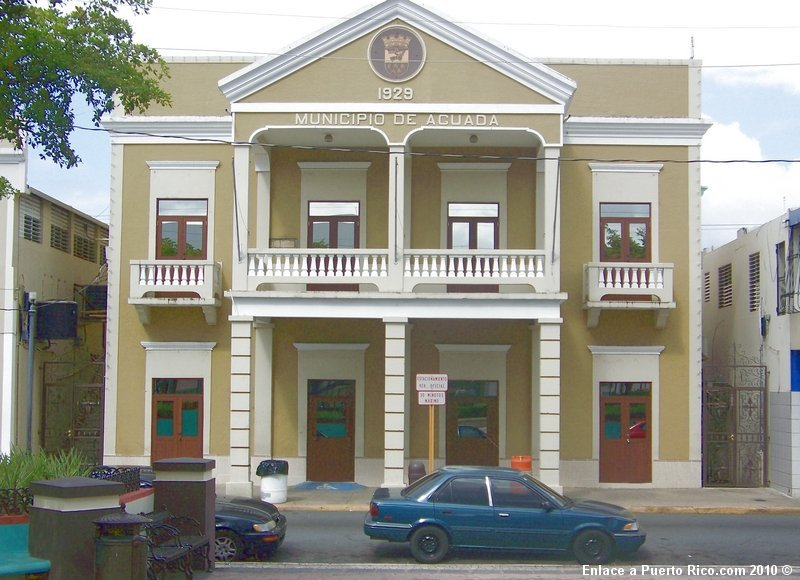
- Aguada City Hall

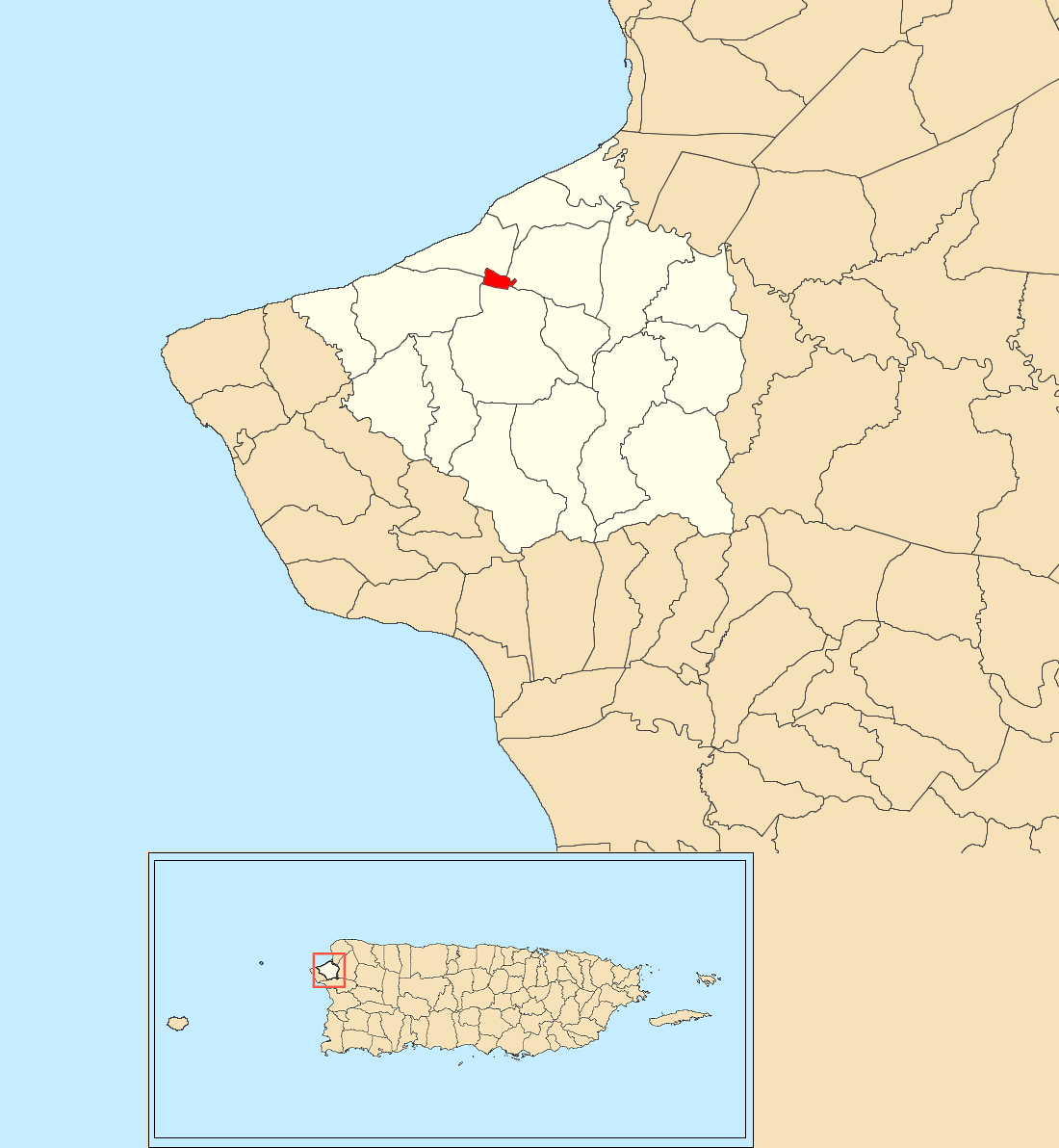
- Location of Tejas within the municipality of Aguada shown in red

- Location of Puerto Rico
- Coordinates: 18°22′49″N 67°11′19″W
- Commonwealth: Puerto Rico
- Municipality: Aguada

Area
  - Total: 0.11 sq mi (0.28 km^{2})
  - Land: 0.11 sq mi (0.28 km^{2})
  - Water: 0.00 sq mi (0 km^{2})
- Elevation: 59 ft (18 m)

Population (2010)
  - Total: 1,324
  - Density: 12,036.4/sq mi (4,647.3/km^{2})
- Source: 2010 Census
- Time zone: UTC−4 (AST)
- ZIP Code: 00602
- Area codes: 787, 939

Aguada barrio-pueblo is a small barrio and the administrative center (seat) of Aguada, a municipality of Puerto Rico. Its population in 2010 was 1,324. Aguada barrio-pueblo has two subdivisions: California and Rosario.

As was customary in Spain, in Puerto Rico, the municipality has a barrio called pueblo which contains a central plaza, the municipal buildings (city hall), and a Catholic church. Fiestas patronales (patron saint festivals) are held in the central plaza every year.

== The central plaza and its church ==
The central plaza, or square, is a place for official and unofficial recreational events and a place where people can gather and socialize from dusk to dawn. The Laws of the Indies, Spanish law, which regulated life in Puerto Rico in the early 19th century, stated the plaza's purpose was for "the parties" (celebrations, festivities) (Spanish: a propósito para las fiestas), and that the square should be proportionally large enough for the number of neighbors (Spanish: grandeza proporcionada al número de vecinos). These Spanish regulations also stated that the streets nearby should be comfortable portals for passersby, protecting them from the elements: sun and rain.

In 1516, the Ermita de Espinar church was built, and after it was destroyed by indigenous people, it was reconstructed in 1639.

Located across the central plaza in Aguada barrio-pueblo is the Parroquia San Francisco de Asís, a Roman Catholic church. It was built in 1692, then reconstructed in 1793. It was destroyed by the 1918 San Fermín earthquake. Following the architectural design of Antonio Martínez and José Lazaro, it was rebuilt between the years 1924 and 1936. Stained glass windows were installed in 1956 and again in 1964. Its interior was remodeled in 1993.

The oldest festival in Puerto Rico was celebrated in and around the church in Aguada. To honor the Immaculate Conception it was held for many years, starting in the 16th century. The festival which lasted eight days went on for many years until ended by the church for having become too commercialized.

Aguada's annual patron saint festival in honor of Francis of Assisi is held from late September to early October in the Plaza Carlos Ruiz.

Historical population
Census	Pop.	Note	%±
1910	909		—
1920	1,078		18.6%
1930	1,662		54.2%
1940	2,137		28.6%
1950	3,178		48.7%
1960	3,759		18.3%
1970	0		−100.0%
1980	2,130		—
1990	1,826		−14.3%
2000	1,755		−3.9%
2010	1,324		−24.6%
U.S. Decennial Census; 1900 (N/A) 1910-1930; 1930-1950 1960 1980-2000 2010

== Sectors ==
Barrios (which are like minor civil divisions) in turn are further subdivided into smaller local populated place areas/units called sectores (sectors in English). The types of sectores may vary, from normally sector to urbanización to reparto to barriada to residencial, among others.

The following sectores are in Aguada barrio-pueblo:

Calle Elomita, Calle Paz, Calle Manuel Ruíz González, Hogar Love and Care, Residencias de Colores, Sector California, Sector Olivo, Sector Rosario, Urbanización Moropó, and Urbanización San Cristóbal.

In Aguada barrio-pueblo is part of the Aguada urban zone.

== Gallery ==
Places in Aguada barrio-pueblo:

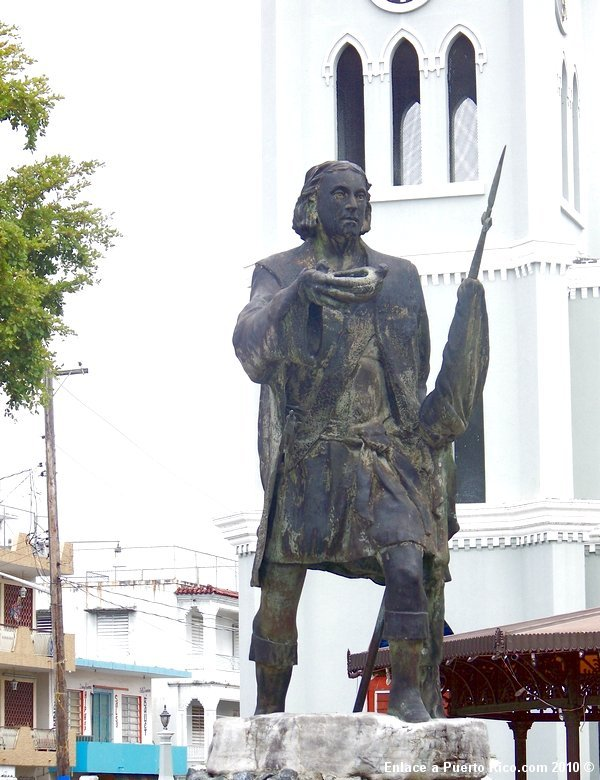
A statue of Cristóbal Colón in the plaza

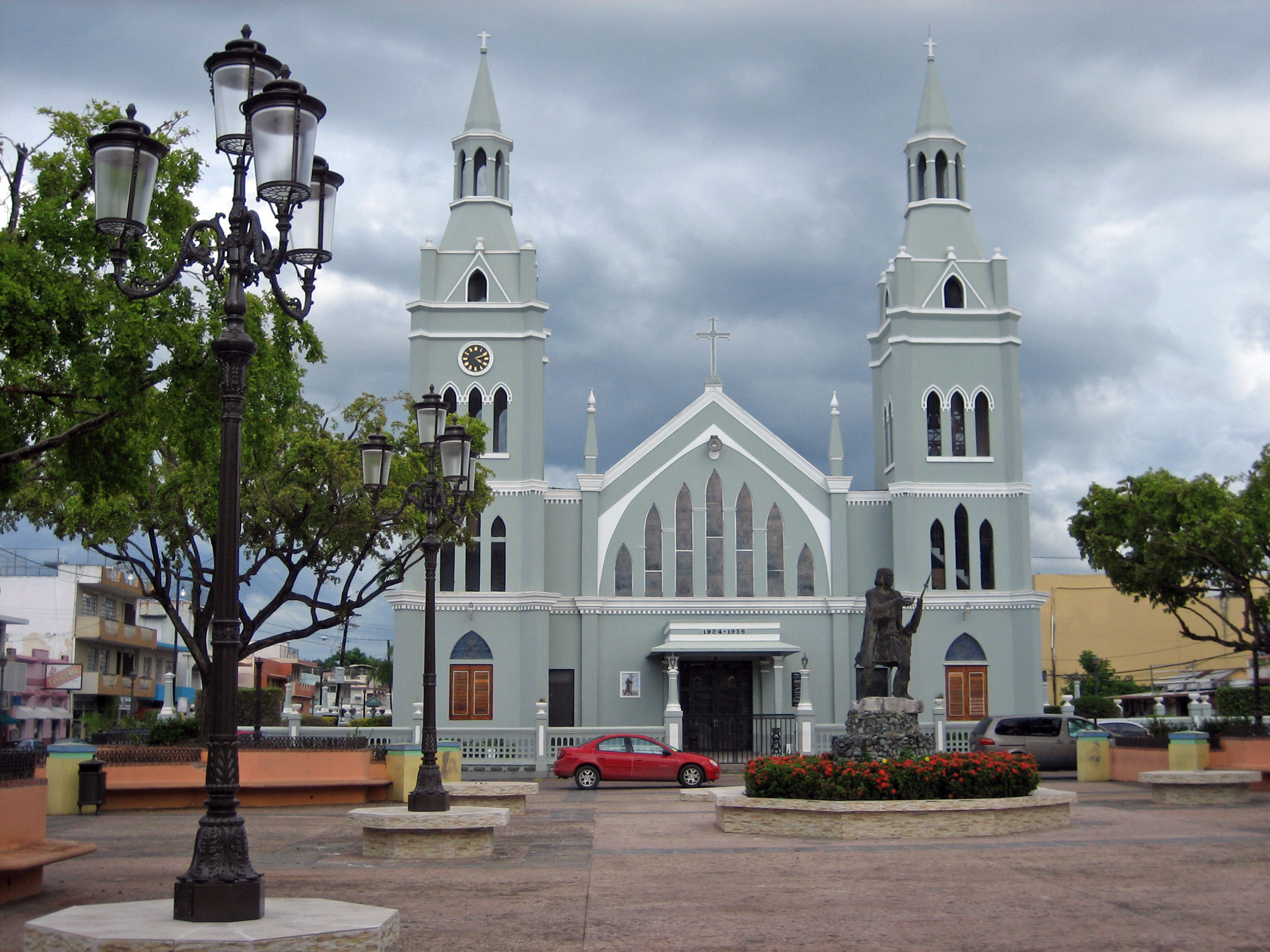
The main plaza and the Roman Catholic Church of Aguada

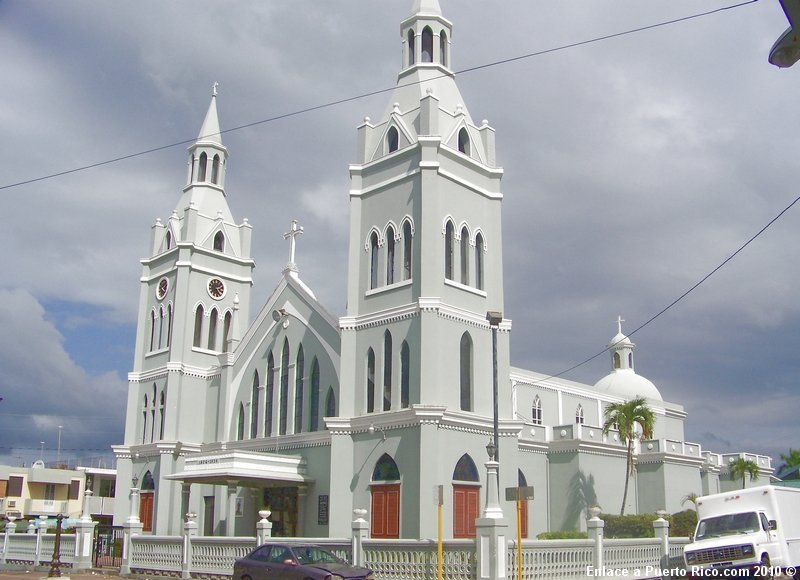
Parroquia de San Francisco de Asís

== See also ==
- List of communities in Puerto Rico
- List of barrios and sectors of Aguada, Puerto Rico
