= Camaceyes, Aguadilla, Puerto Rico =

Barrio of Puerto Rico

Camaceyes
- Barrio
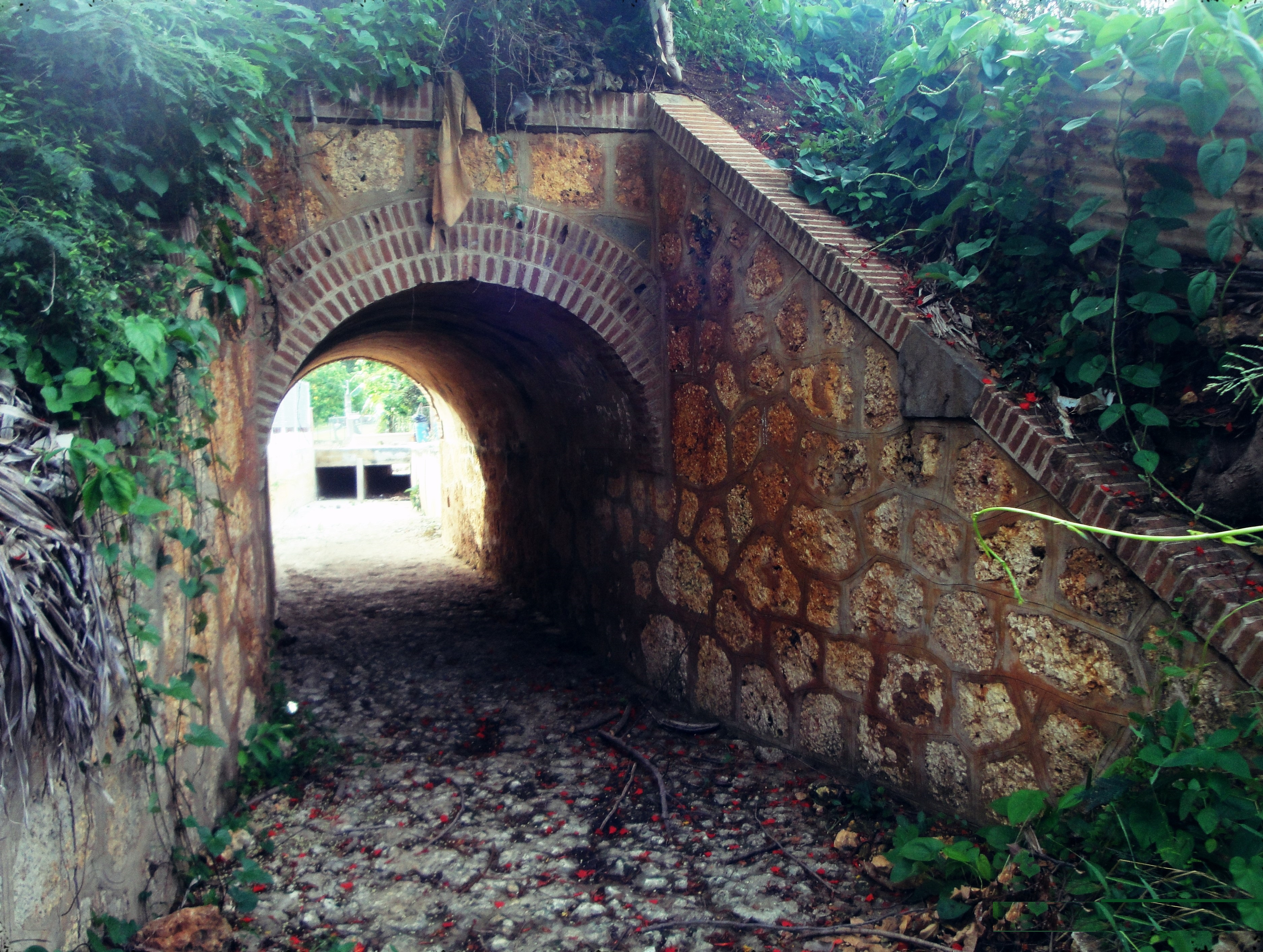
- Culvert in Camaceyes, Aguadilla

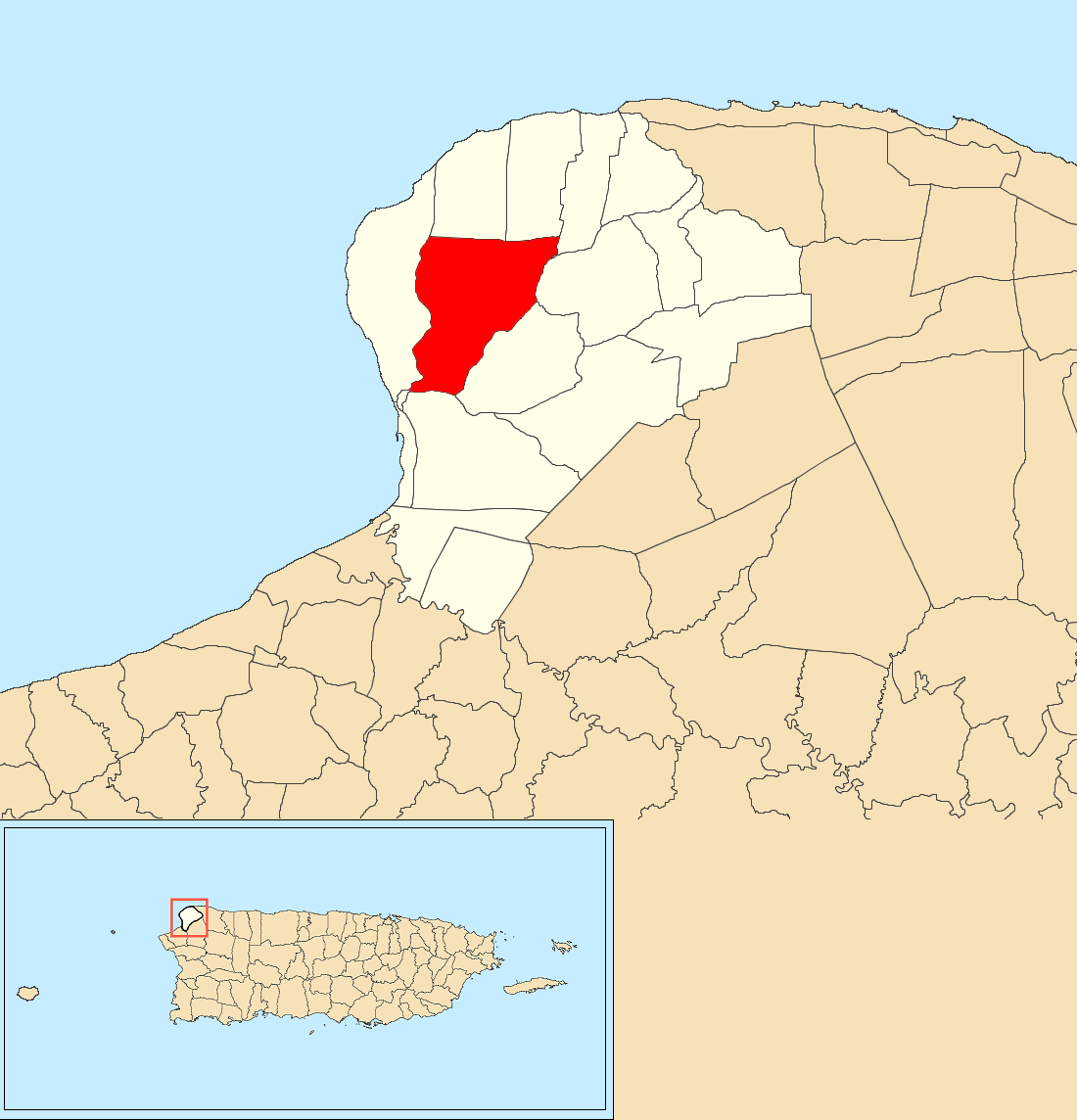

- Location of Puerto Rico
- Coordinates: 18°28′04″N 67°08′19″W
- Commonwealth: Puerto Rico
- Municipality: Aguadilla

Area
  - Total: 3.82 sq mi (9.9 km^{2})
  - Land: 3.81 sq mi (9.9 km^{2})
  - Water: 0.01 sq mi (0.026 km^{2})
- Elevation: 325 ft (99 m)

Population (2010)
  - Total: 12,547
  - Density: 3,293.2/sq mi (1,271.5/km^{2})
- Source: 2010 Census
- Time zone: UTC−4 (AST)
- ZIP code: 00603

Camaceyes is a barrio in the municipality of Aguadilla, Puerto Rico. Its population in 2010 was 12,547. In Camaceyes barrio is part of the Aguadilla urban zone.

== History ==
Camaceyes was in Spain's gazetteers until Puerto Rico was ceded by Spain in the aftermath of the Spanish–American War under the terms of the Treaty of Paris of 1898 and became an unincorporated territory of the United States. In 1899, the United States Department of War conducted a census of Puerto Rico finding that the population of Camaceyes barrio was 1,633.

Historical population
Census	Pop.	Note	%±
1900	1,633		—
1910	2,070		26.8%
1920	2,112		2.0%
1930	2,627		24.4%
1940	3,763		43.2%
1950	4,746		26.1%
1960	3,900		−17.8%
1970	0		−100.0%
1980	10,483		—
1990	10,659		1.7%
2000	12,138		13.9%
2010	12,547		3.4%
U.S. Decennial Census; 1899 (shown as 1900) 1910-1930; 1930-1950 1980-2000 2010

== Features ==
Cerro Vigía, a summit with an elevation of 486 feet, is located in Camaceyes.

== Sectors ==
Barrios (which are, in contemporary times, roughly comparable to minor civil divisions) in turn are further subdivided into smaller local populated place areas/units called sectores (sectors in English). The types of sectores may vary, from normally sector to urbanización to reparto to barriada to residencial, among others.

The following sectors are in Camaceyes barrio:

Barrio Camaceyes Este, Barrio Camaceyes Sur, Calle El Castillo, Calle Obdulio Vega, Calle González, Calle Los Morales, Calle Tony Croato, Carretera Feliciano, Condominio Chalet Deville, Condominio Portales de Camaceyes, Égida Víctor Hernández, Extensión El Prado, Hacienda Andares, Llanos Verdes, Los Morales, Los Vázquez, Paseo del Parque, Paseos de Jaicoa, Paseos Providencia, Reparto Jiménez, Reparto Llanos Verdes, Reparto López, Reparto San José, Residencial Montaña, Residencial Villa Nueva, Residencial y Urbanización García Ducós, Sector Barrio Las Palomas, Sector El Cuco, Sector Feliciano, Sector La Alambra, Sector La Esquina, Sector Santos Gómez, Sector Solá del Llano, Urbanización Alhambra, Urbanización El Prado, Urbanización Hacienda Los Andrés, Urbanización Jardines de Aguadilla, Urbanización Las Colinas, Urbanización Maleza Gardens, Urbanización Montaña, Urbanización Parque La Arboleda, Urbanización Paseo Alta Vista, Urbanización Paseo Lomas Llanas, Urbanización Paseo Universitario, Urbanización Portales de Camaceyes, Urbanización Rubianes, Urbanización San Carlos, Urbanización Tony Croatto, Urbanización Villas de Prado Alto, Urbanización Villas del Horizonte, Urbanización Villas Universitarias, Villa Juanita, and Villa Universidad.

== See also ==
- List of communities in Puerto Rico
- List of barrios and sectors of Aguadilla, Puerto Rico
