= Puntas, Rincón, Puerto Rico =

Barrio of Puerto Rico

Puntas
- Barrio
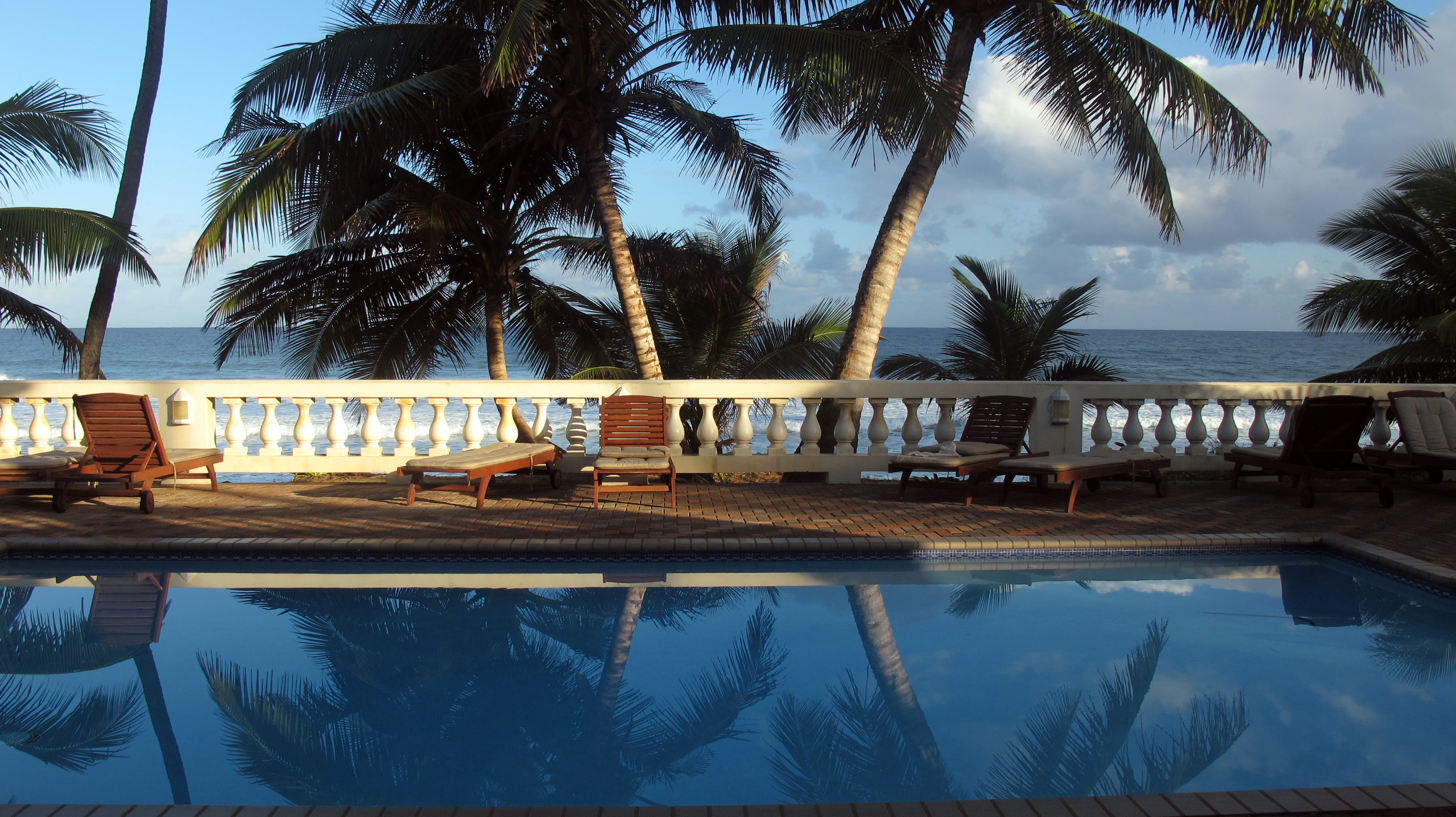
- Casa Isleña in Puntas

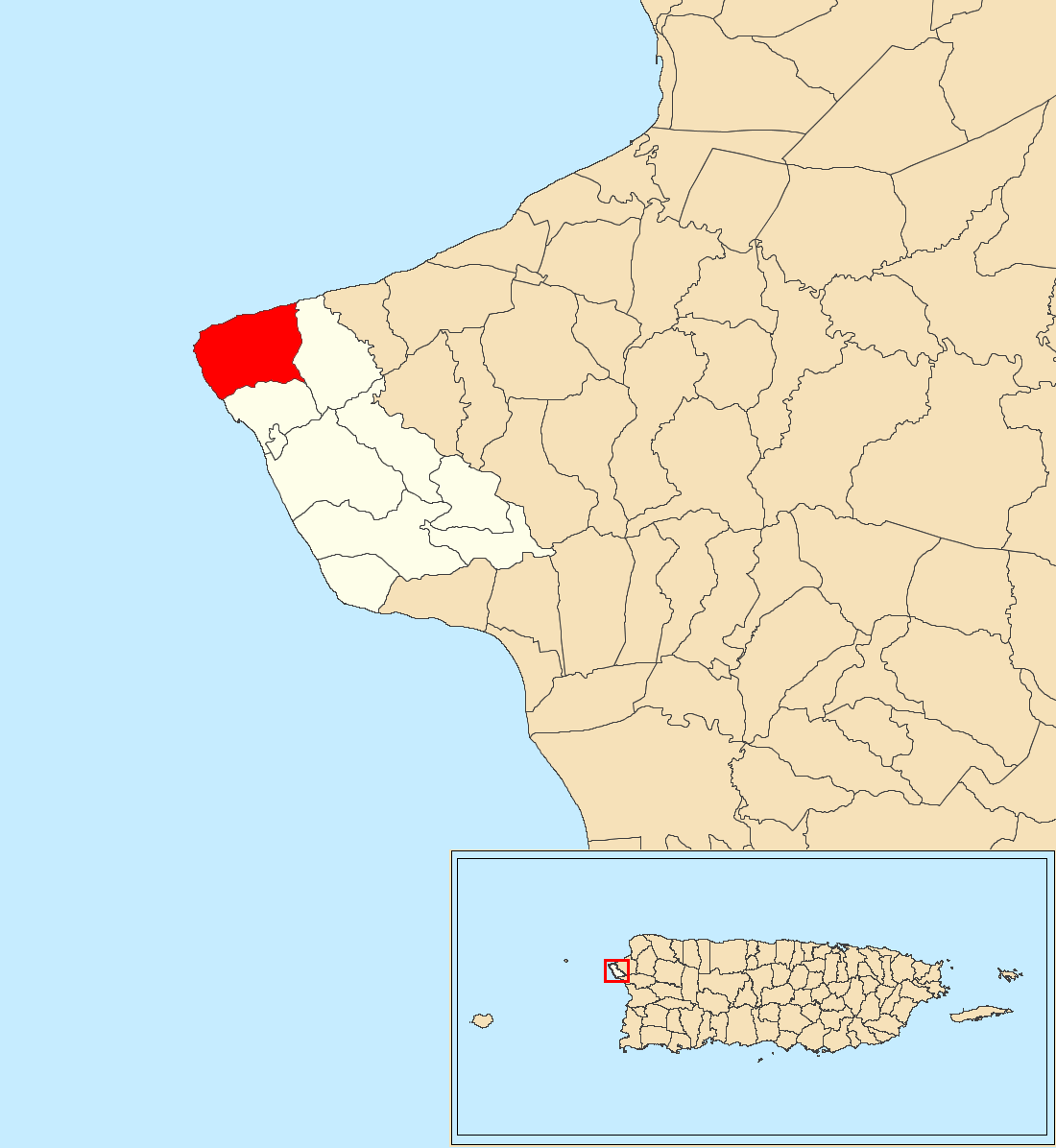
- Location of Puntas within the municipality of Rincón shown in red

- Location of Puerto Rico
- Coordinates: 18°21′46″N 67°15′34″W
- Commonwealth: Puerto Rico
- Municipality: Rincón

Area
  - Total: 2.45 sq mi (6.3 km^{2})
  - Land: 1.93 sq mi (5.0 km^{2})
  - Water: 0.52 sq mi (1.3 km^{2})
- Elevation: 253 ft (77 m)

Population (2010)
  - Total: 1,575
  - Density: 816.1/sq mi (315.1/km^{2})
- Source: 2010 Census
- Time zone: UTC−4 (AST)
- ZIP Code: 00677
- Area code: 787/939

Puntas is a barrio in the municipality of Rincón, Puerto Rico. Its population in 2010 was 1,575.

Puntas is known for surfing spots and whale watching.

== History ==
Puntas was in Spain's gazetteers until Puerto Rico was ceded by Spain in the aftermath of the Spanish–American War under the terms of the Treaty of Paris of 1898 and became an unincorporated territory of the United States. In 1899, the United States Department of War conducted a census of Puerto Rico finding that the population of Puntas barrio was 1,006.

Historical population
Census	Pop.	Note	%±
1900	1,006		—
1910	1,239		23.2%
1920	1,350		9.0%
1930	1,255		−7.0%
1940	1,274		1.5%
1950	1,382		8.5%
1960	894		−35.3%
1970	1,183		32.3%
1980	1,531		29.4%
1990	1,592		4.0%
2000	1,679		5.5%
2010	1,575		−6.2%
U.S. Decennial Census; 1899 (shown as 1900) 1910-1930; 1930-1950 1980-2000 2010

== Sectors ==
Barrios (which are, in contemporary times, roughly comparable to minor civil divisions) in turn are further subdivided into smaller local populated place areas/units called sectores (sectors in English). The types of sectores may vary, from normally sector to urbanización to reparto to barriada to residencial, among others.

The following sectors are in Puntas barrio:

Calle Boulevard, Calle Colinas Lindas, Calle Los Flamboyanes, Camino Interior, Camino Martillo, Camino Vista Nuclear, Carretera 413, Centro Puntas, Condominio Landing View Village, Paseo Tirado Sánchez, Punta Higüera, Puntas Nuevas, Ramal 413, Sector Alfonso Arizmendi, Sector Brisas, Sector Buena Vista, Sector Cielo Mar, Sector Colinas Lindas, Sector Collazo, Sector Cuchillo de Piñas, Sector Dominga Cardona, Sector Ismael Sánchez, Sector Los Cipreses, Sector Los Flamboyanes, Sector Trinitarias, Sector Vereno, and Sector Vista Linda.

== See also ==
- List of communities in Puerto Rico
- List of barrios and sectors of Rincón, Puerto Rico
