= Victoria, Aguadilla, Puerto Rico =

Barrio of Puerto Rico

Victoria
- Barrio
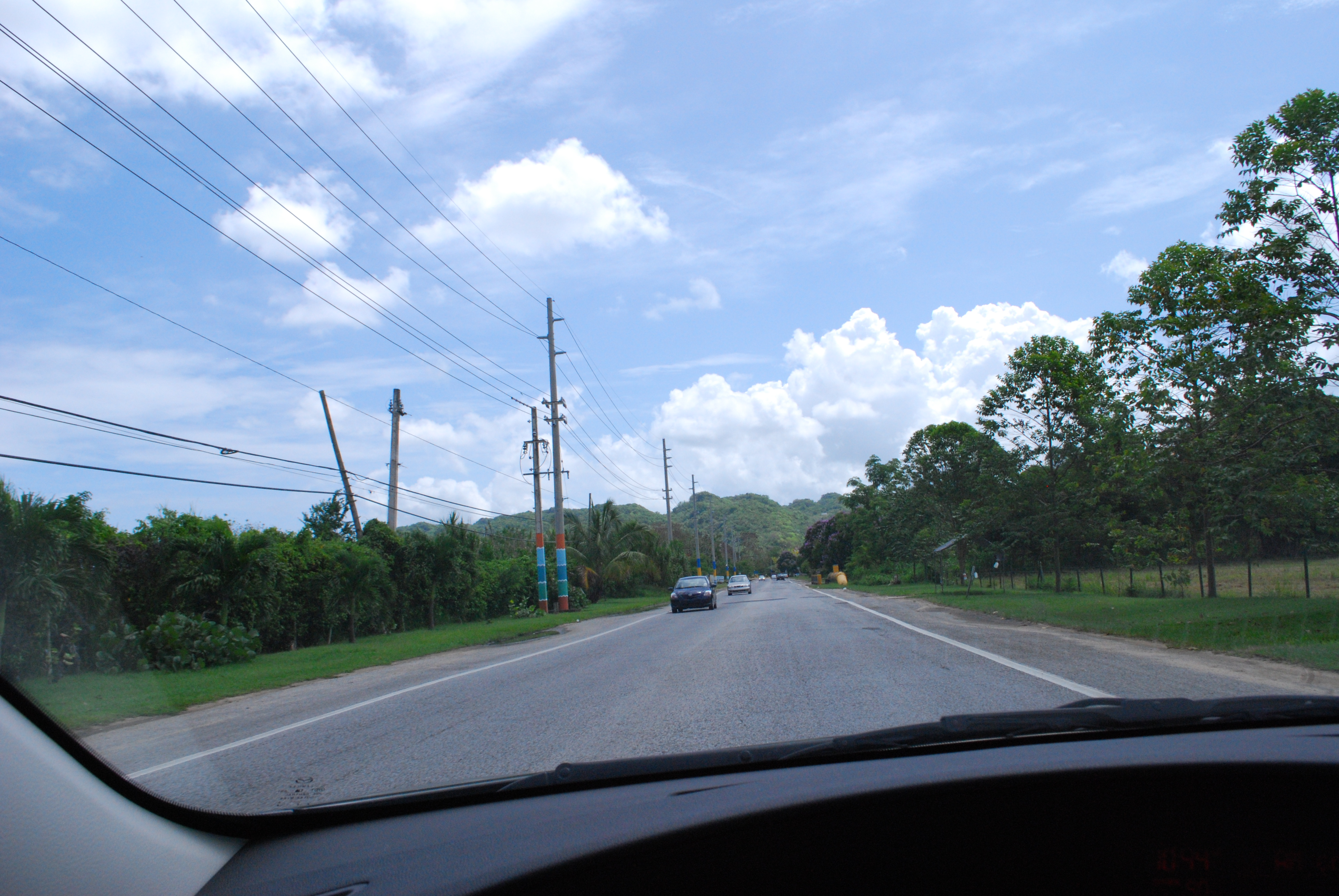
- Puerto Rico Highway 115 between Espinar and Victoria

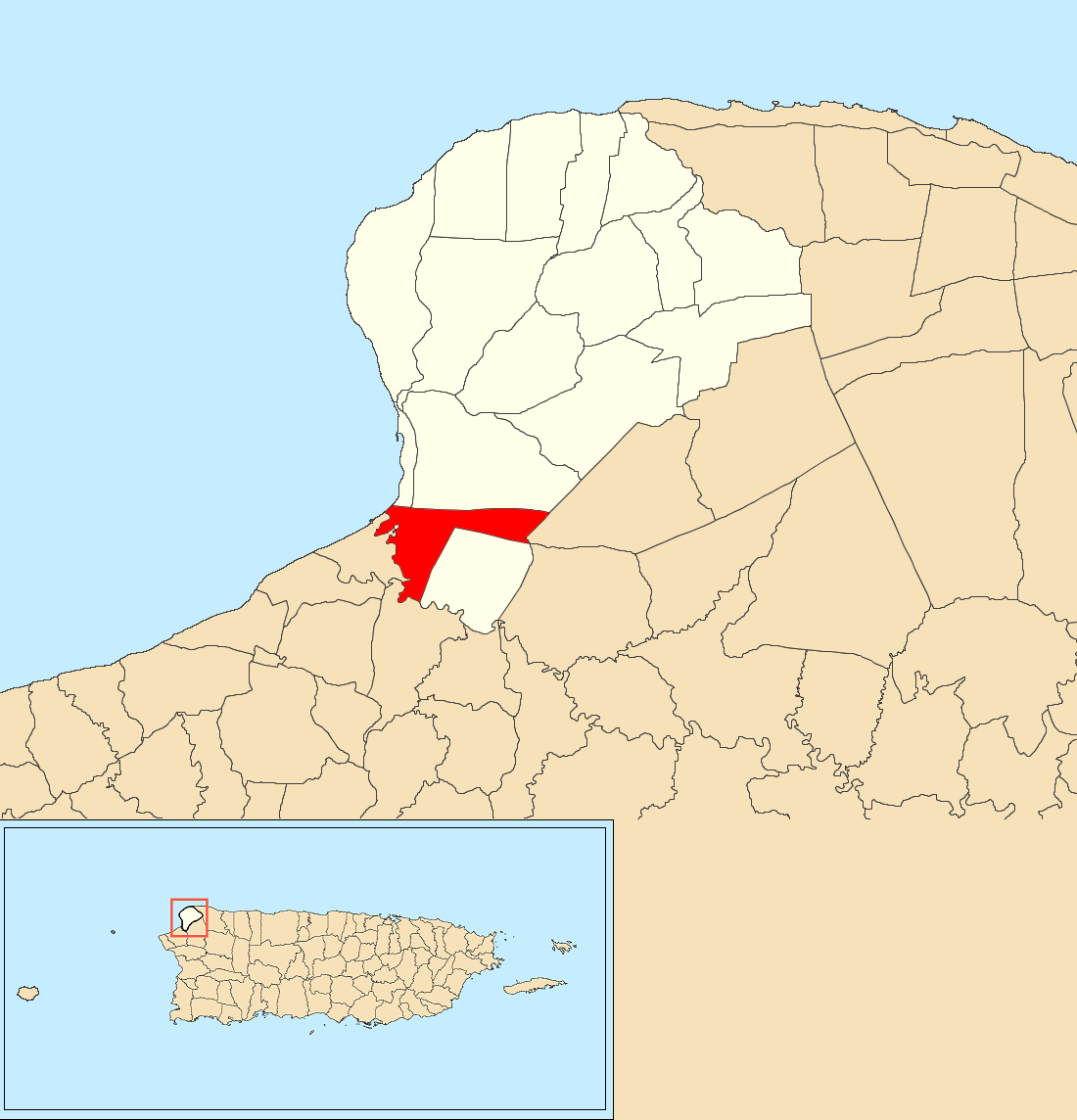

- Location of Puerto Rico
- Coordinates: 18°24′23″N 67°08′56″W
- Commonwealth: Puerto Rico
- Municipality: Aguadilla

Area
  - Total: 1.70 sq mi (4.4 km^{2})
  - Land: 1.67 sq mi (4.3 km^{2})
  - Water: 0.03 sq mi (0.078 km^{2})
- Elevation: 338 ft (103 m)

Population (2010)
  - Total: 1,790
  - Density: 1,071.9/sq mi (413.9/km^{2})
- Source: 2010 Census
- Time zone: UTC−4 (AST)
- ZIP Code: 00603

Victoria is a barrio in the municipality of Aguadilla, Puerto Rico. Its population in 2010 was 1,790. Victoria barrio is part of the Aguadilla urban zone.

== History ==
A lot of sugar cane was grown in Victoria in the 19th century.

Victoria was in Spain's gazetteers until Puerto Rico was ceded by Spain in the aftermath of the Spanish–American War under the terms of the Treaty of Paris of 1898 and became an unincorporated territory of the United States. In 1899, the United States Department of War conducted a census of Puerto Rico finding that the population of Victoria barrio was 716.

Historical population
Census	Pop.	Note	%±
1900	716		—
1910	917		28.1%
1920	1,035		12.9%
1930	1,104		6.7%
1940	1,259		14.0%
1950	1,311		4.1%
1960	1,001		−23.6%
1970	0		−100.0%
1980	2,583		—
1990	2,519		−2.5%
2000	2,043		−18.9%
2010	1,790		−12.4%
U.S. Decennial Census; 1899 (shown as 1900) 1910-1930; 1930-1950 1980-2000 2010

== Features ==
Victoria has an elevation of 338 feet. The José de Diego School is located in Victoria. Los Cerros Viñet, a summit with an elevation of 676 feet, is located in Victoria.

== Sectors ==
Barrios (which are, in contemporary times, roughly comparable to minor civil divisions) in turn are further subdivided into smaller local populated place areas/units called sectores (sectors in English). The types of sectores may vary, from normally sector to urbanización to reparto to barriada to residencial, among others.

The following sectors are in Victoria barrio:

Condominio Vistamar.

== See also ==
- List of communities in Puerto Rico
- List of barrios and sectors of Aguadilla, Puerto Rico
