= Pueblo, Rincón, Puerto Rico =

Barrio of Puerto Rico

Pueblo
- Barrio
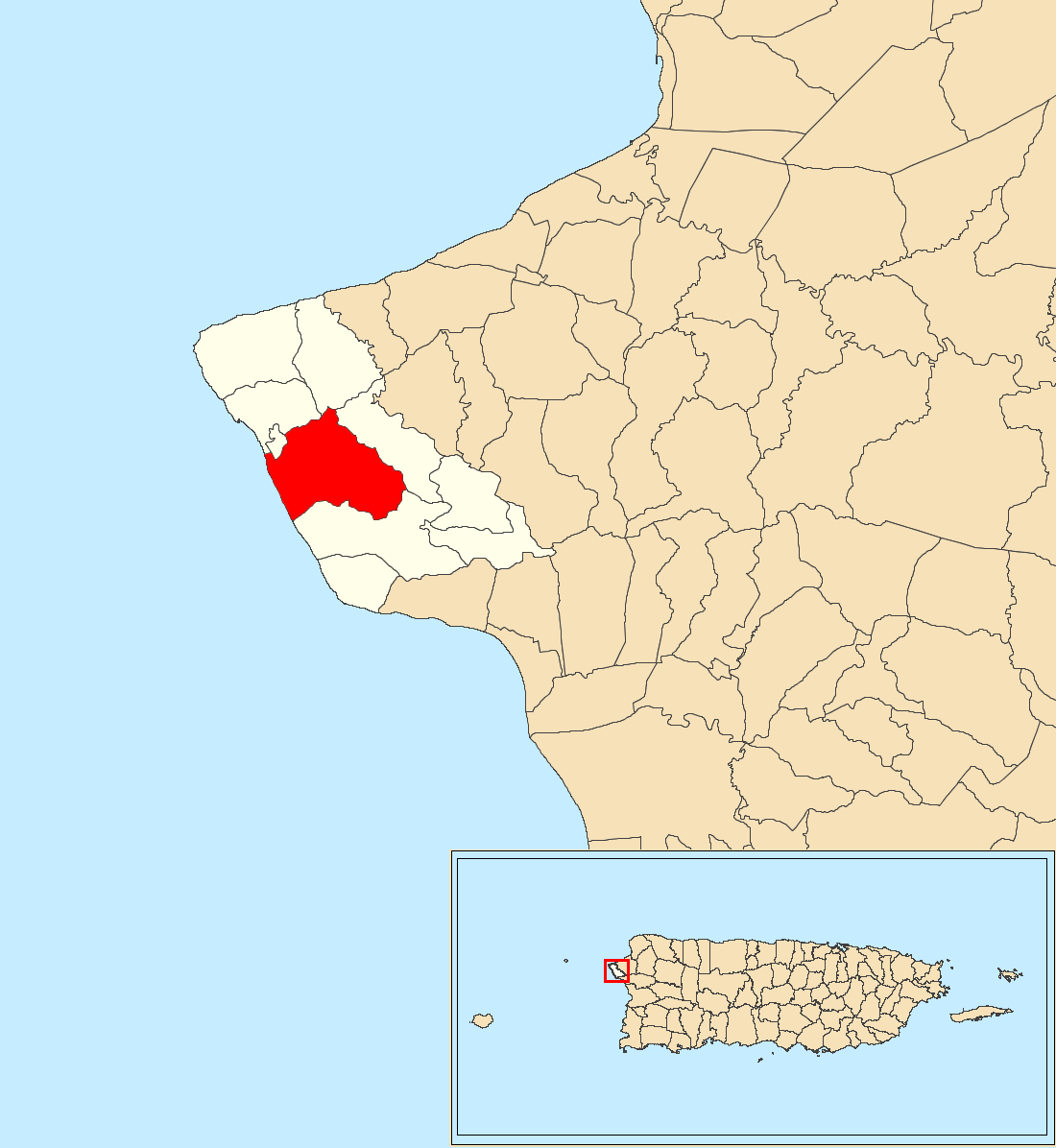
- Location of Pueblo within the municipality of Rincón shown in red

- Location of Puerto Rico
- Coordinates: 18°19′57″N 67°14′30″W
- Commonwealth: Puerto Rico
- Municipality: Rincón

Area
  - Total: 2.80 sq mi (7.3 km^{2})
  - Land: 2.56 sq mi (6.6 km^{2})
  - Water: 0.24 sq mi (0.62 km^{2})
- Elevation: 164 ft (50 m)

Population (2010)
  - Total: 3,796
  - Density: 1,482.8/sq mi (572.5/km^{2})
- Source: 2010 Census
- Time zone: UTC−4 (AST)
- ZIP Code: 00677
- Area code: 787/939

Pueblo is a barrio in the municipality of Rincón, Puerto Rico. Its population in 2010 was 3,796. There is also the administrative center and seat called Rincón barrio-pueblo in this municipality, with a smaller population.

== History ==
Pueblo was in Spain's gazetteers until Puerto Rico was ceded by Spain in the aftermath of the Spanish–American War under the terms of the Treaty of Paris of 1898 and became an unincorporated territory of the United States. In 1899, the United States Department of War conducted a census of Puerto Rico finding that the population of Pueblo combined with Rincón barrio-pueblo was 1,074. The population was reported but combined with Rincón barrio-pueblo until the 1950 census when it was reported separately, as 1458.

Historical population
Census	Pop.	Note	%±
1950	1,458		—
1960	1,300		−10.8%
1970	0		−100.0%
1980	2,574		—
1990	2,992		16.2%
2000	3,393		13.4%
2010	3,796		11.9%
U.S. Decennial Census; 1899 (shown as 1900) 1910-1930; 1930-1950 1980-2000 2010

== Sectors ==
Barrios (which are, in contemporary times, roughly comparable to minor civil divisions) in turn are further subdivided into smaller local populated place areas/units called sectores (sectors in English). The types of sectores may vary, from normally sector to urbanización to reparto to barriada to residencial, among others.

The following sectors are in Pueblo barrio:

Avenida Albizu Campos, Avenida Canal, Avenida Vistamar, Barrio Pueblo Rural, Calle Borinquen Sea Beach Drive, Calle Encanto, Calle Fisherman Walk, Calle Francisco Colón Guerra, Calle Germán Chaparro Villanueva, Calle Los Robles, Calle Muñoz Rivera, Calle Muñoz Rivera, Calle Pelican Walk, Calle Vistamar, Camino Vistamar, Carretera 115, Carretera 412, Carretera 414 (Camino Mortero), Cofresí Tower, Comunidad Stella, Condominio Coconut Court, Condominio Puerta del Sol, Condominio Puesta del Sol, Condominio Sea Beamorrench Village, Condominio Stella del Mar, Extensión Los Robles, Reparto Matías, Sector El Coquí, Sector La Jalda o Camino Anselmo, Sector Los Caobos, Sector Maní, Sector Muñoz, Sector Soto, Sector Vargas, Sector Villa Rincón, Sectores Korea, Urbanización Colinas Monte y Mar, Urbanización Sea Beach Colony, Urbanización Villa Rincón, Vertedero, Villa Angélica, Villa Cofresí, and Villas de la Pradera.

== See also ==
- List of communities in Puerto Rico
- List of barrios and sectors of Rincón, Puerto Rico
