= Carrizal, Aguada, Puerto Rico =

Barrio of Puerto Rico

Carrizal
- Barrio
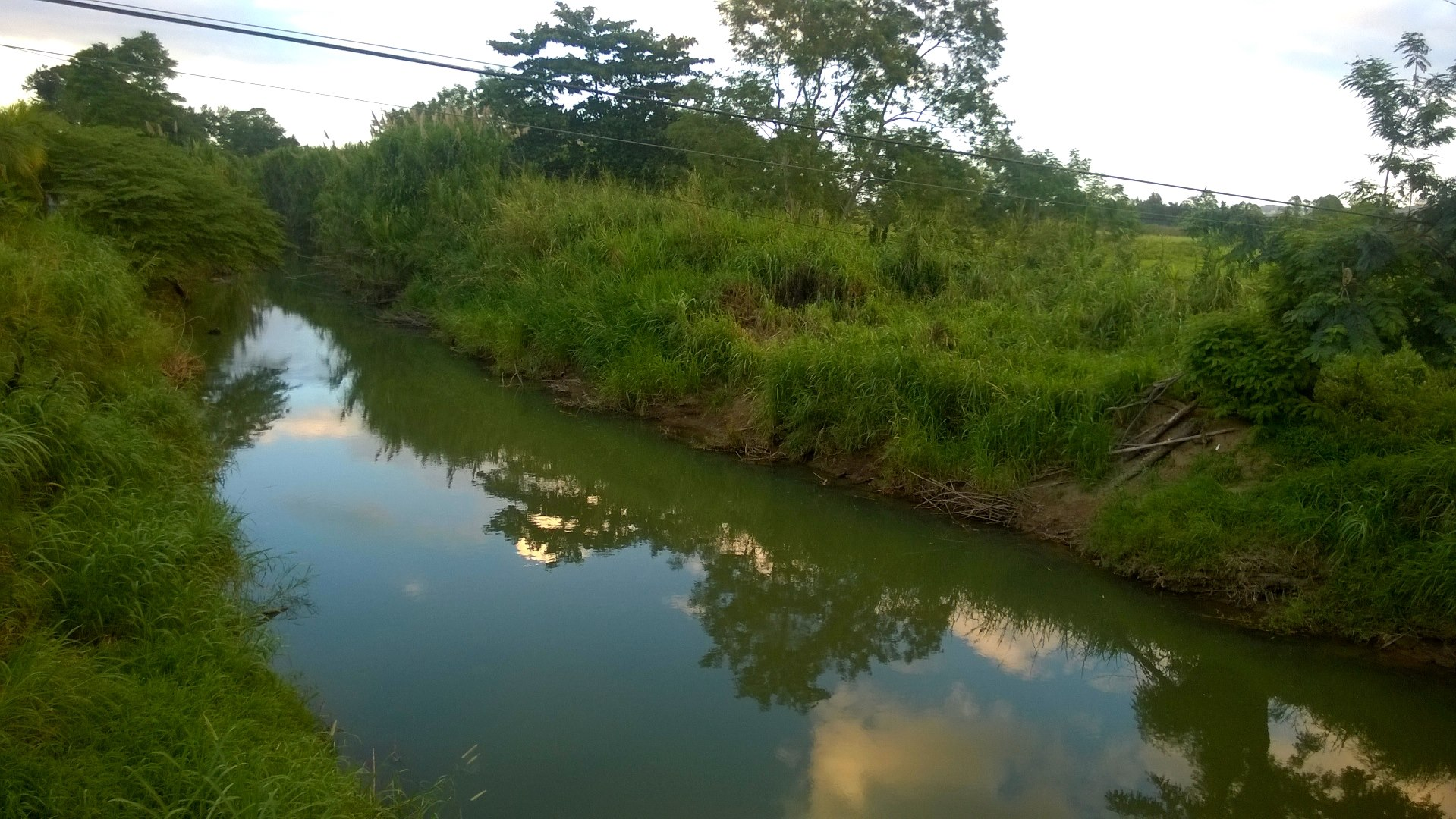
- Culebrinas River between Carrizal and Espinar

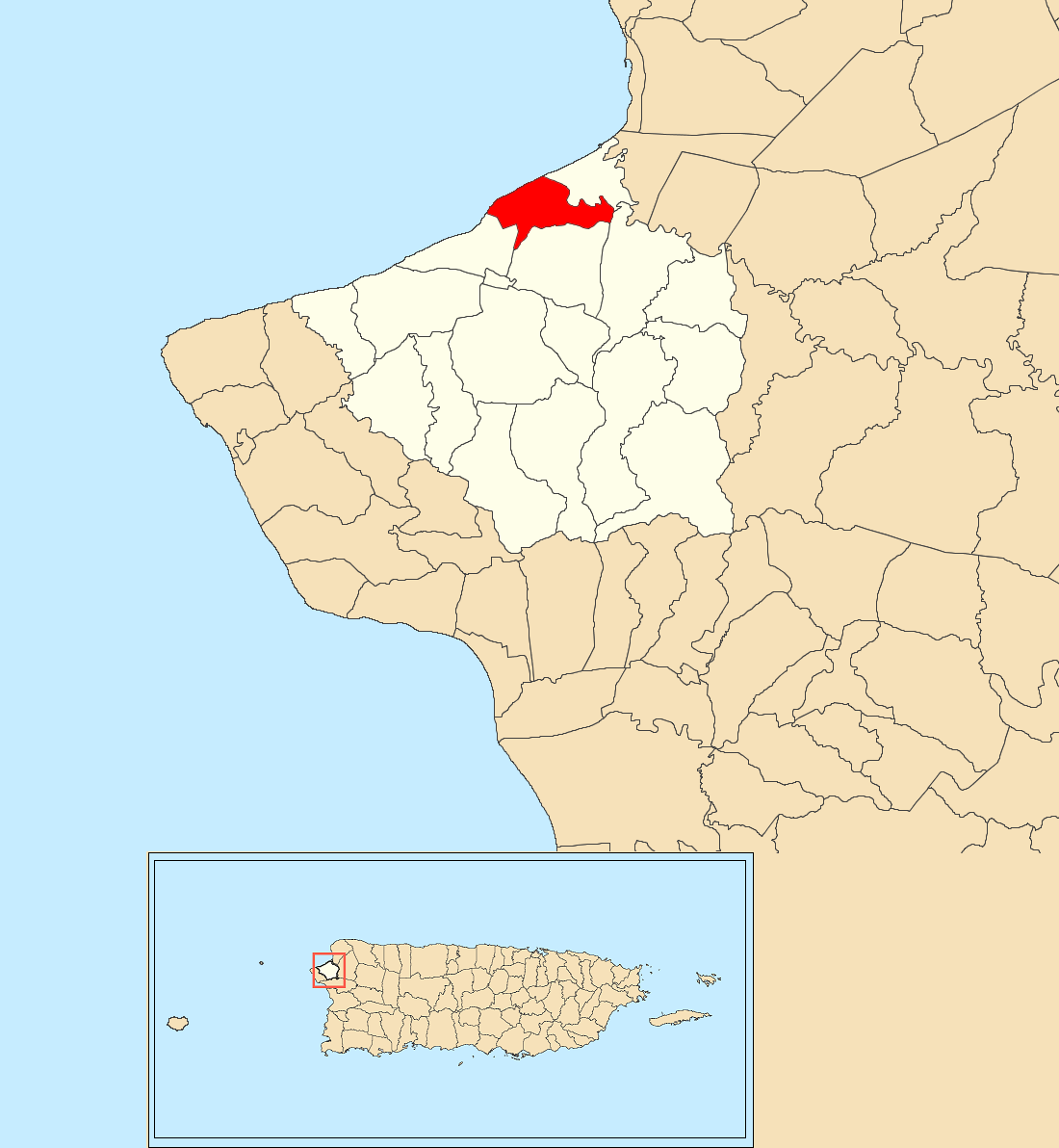
- Location of Carrizal within the municipality of Aguada shown in red

- Location of Puerto Rico
- Coordinates: 18°23′57″N 67°10′49″W
- Commonwealth: Puerto Rico
- Municipality: Aguada

Area
  - Total: 1.44 sq mi (3.7 km^{2})
  - Land: 1.12 sq mi (2.9 km^{2})
  - Water: 0.32 sq mi (0.83 km^{2})
- Elevation: 7 ft (2.1 m)

Population (2010)
  - Total: 970
  - Density: 866.1/sq mi (334.4/km^{2})
- Source: 2010 Census
- Time zone: UTC−4 (AST)
- ZIP Code: 00602
- Area codes: 787, 939

Carrizal is a barrio in the municipality of Aguada, Puerto Rico. Its population in 2010 was 970.

== History ==
Carrizal was in Spain's gazetteers until Puerto Rico was ceded by Spain in the aftermath of the Spanish–American War under the terms of the Treaty of Paris of 1898 and became an unincorporated territory of the United States. In 1899, the United States Department of War conducted a census of Puerto Rico finding that the combined population of Carrizal and Espinar (Espinal) barrios was 1,010.

Historical population
| Census | Pop. | Note | %± |
|---|---|---|---|
| 1910 | 562 | | — |
| 1920 | 525 | | −6.6% |
| 1930 | 674 | | 28.4% |
| 1940 | 797 | | 18.2% |
| 1950 | 683 | | −14.3% |
| 1960 | 606 | | −11.3% |
| 1970 | 621 | | 2.5% |
| 1980 | 715 | | 15.1% |
| 1990 | 697 | | −2.5% |
| 2000 | 1,063 | | 52.5% |
| 2010 | 970 | | −8.7% |
U.S. Decennial Census; 1900 (N/A) 1910-1930; 1930-1950 1960 1980-2000 2010

== Sectors ==
Barrios (which are, in contemporary times, roughly comparable to minor civil divisions) in turn are further subdivided into smaller local populated place areas/units called sectores (sectors in English). The types of sectores may vary, from normally sector to urbanización to reparto to barriada to residencial, among others.

The following sectors are in Carrizal barrio:

Comunidad Las Flores, Égida Hogar Emmanuel Community Home, Parcelas Palmar Novoa Nuevas, Sector Aponte, Sector El Mameyito, Sector Hormigonera, Sector La Vía, Sector Punta Boquerón, Sector Tablonal, and Urbanización Villa Camaly.

== Gallery ==
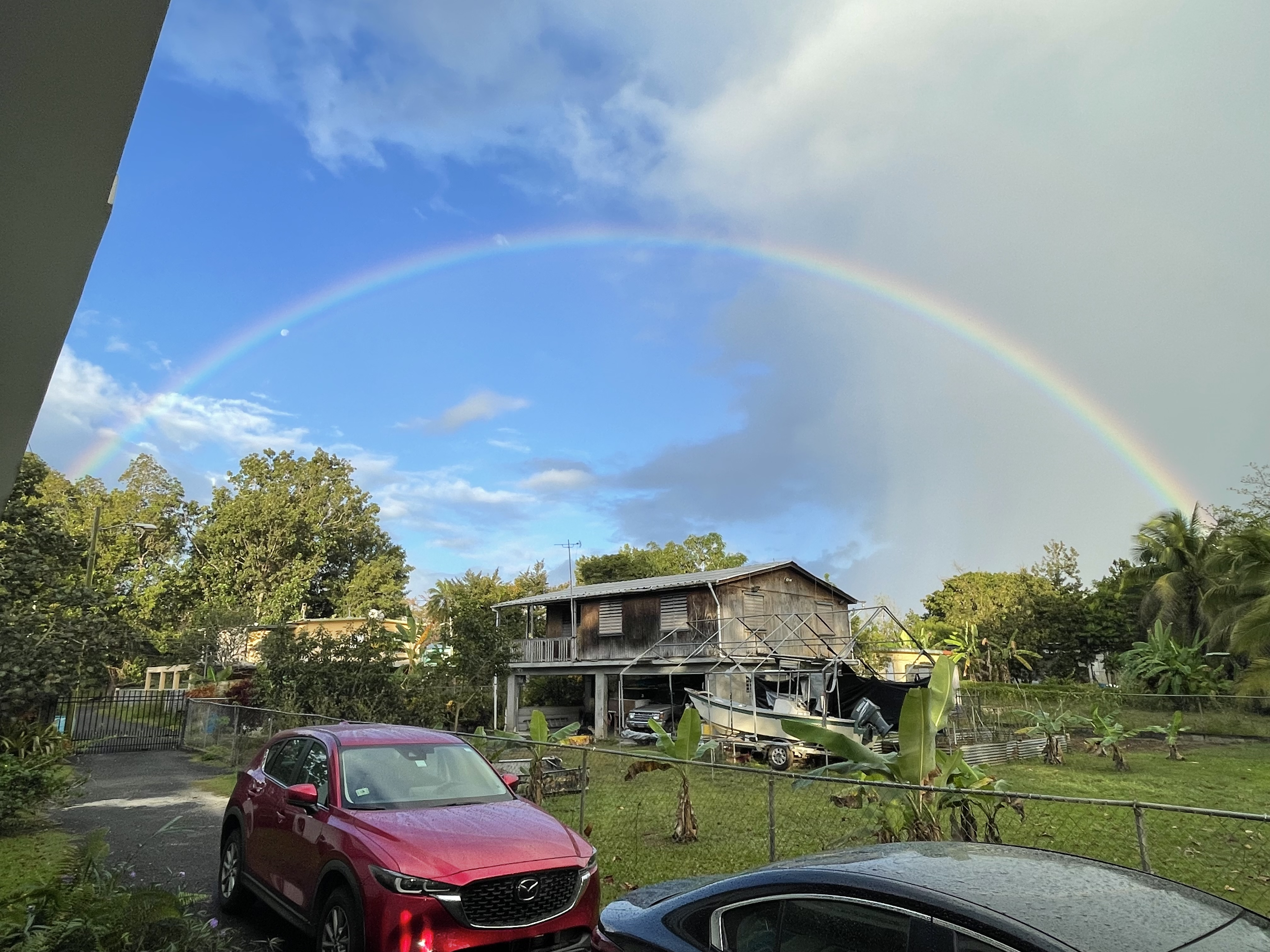
Rainbow in Carrizal

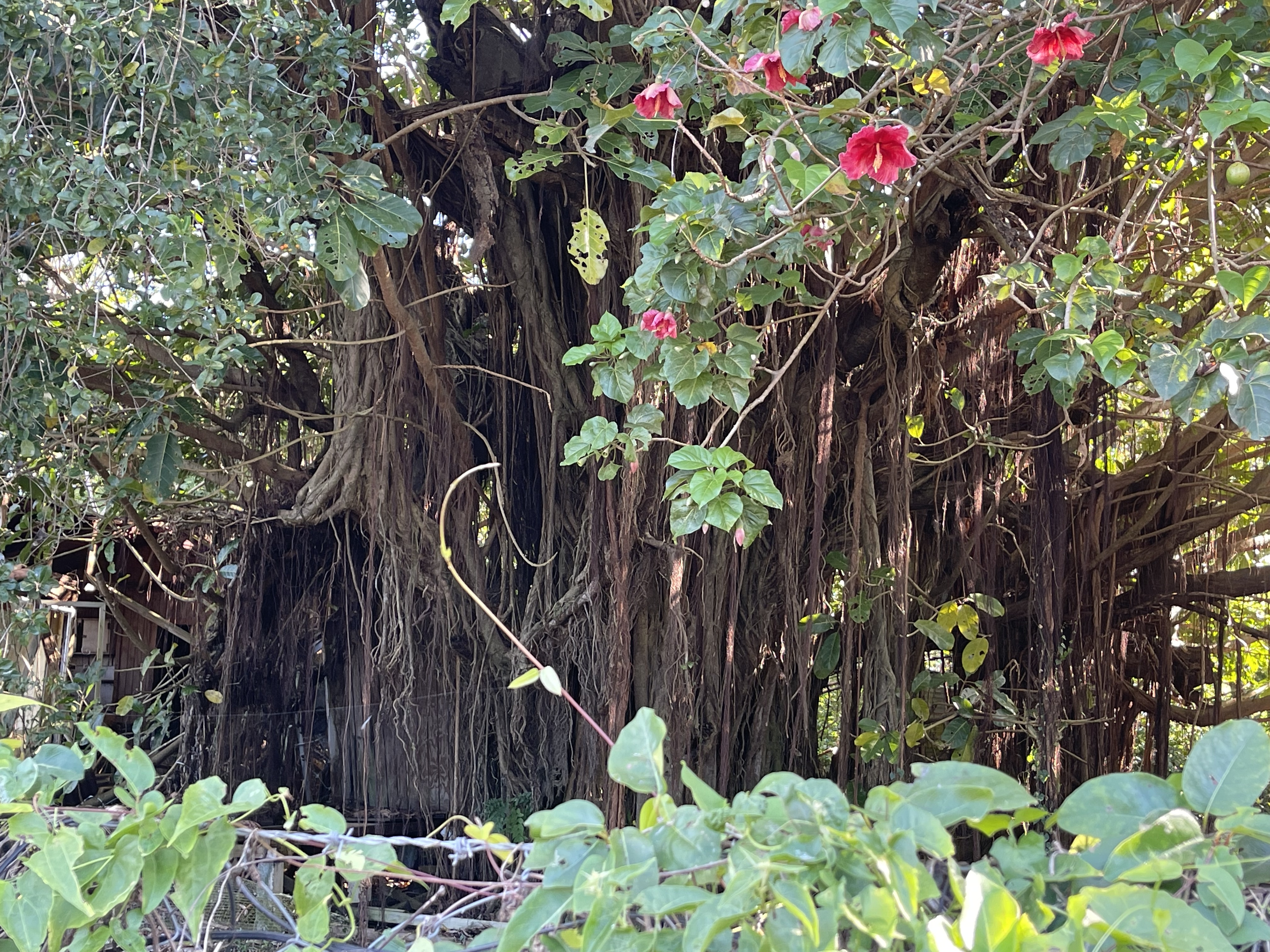
Scene in Carrizal

== See also ==
- List of communities in Puerto Rico
- List of barrios and sectors of Aguada, Puerto Rico
