= Rincón barrio-pueblo =

Historical and administrative center (seat) of Rincón, Puerto Rico

Rincón barrio-pueblo Pueblo de Rincón
- Municipality Seat
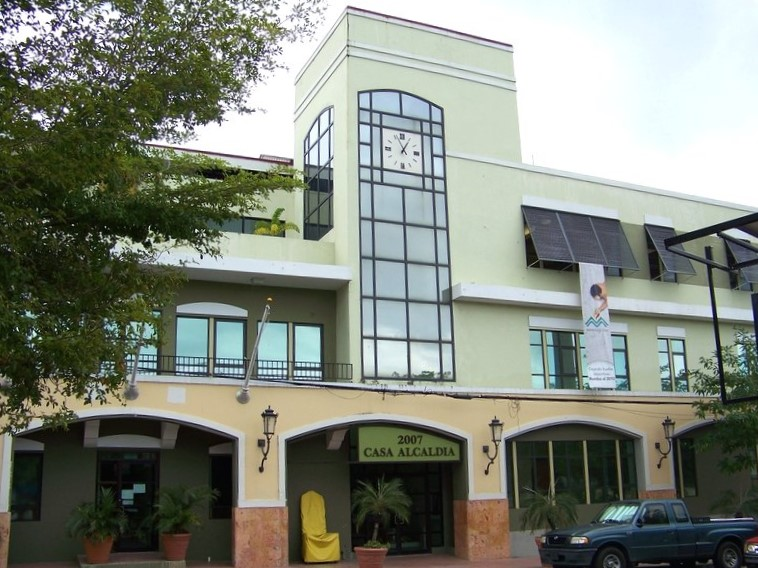
- Rincón Town Hall

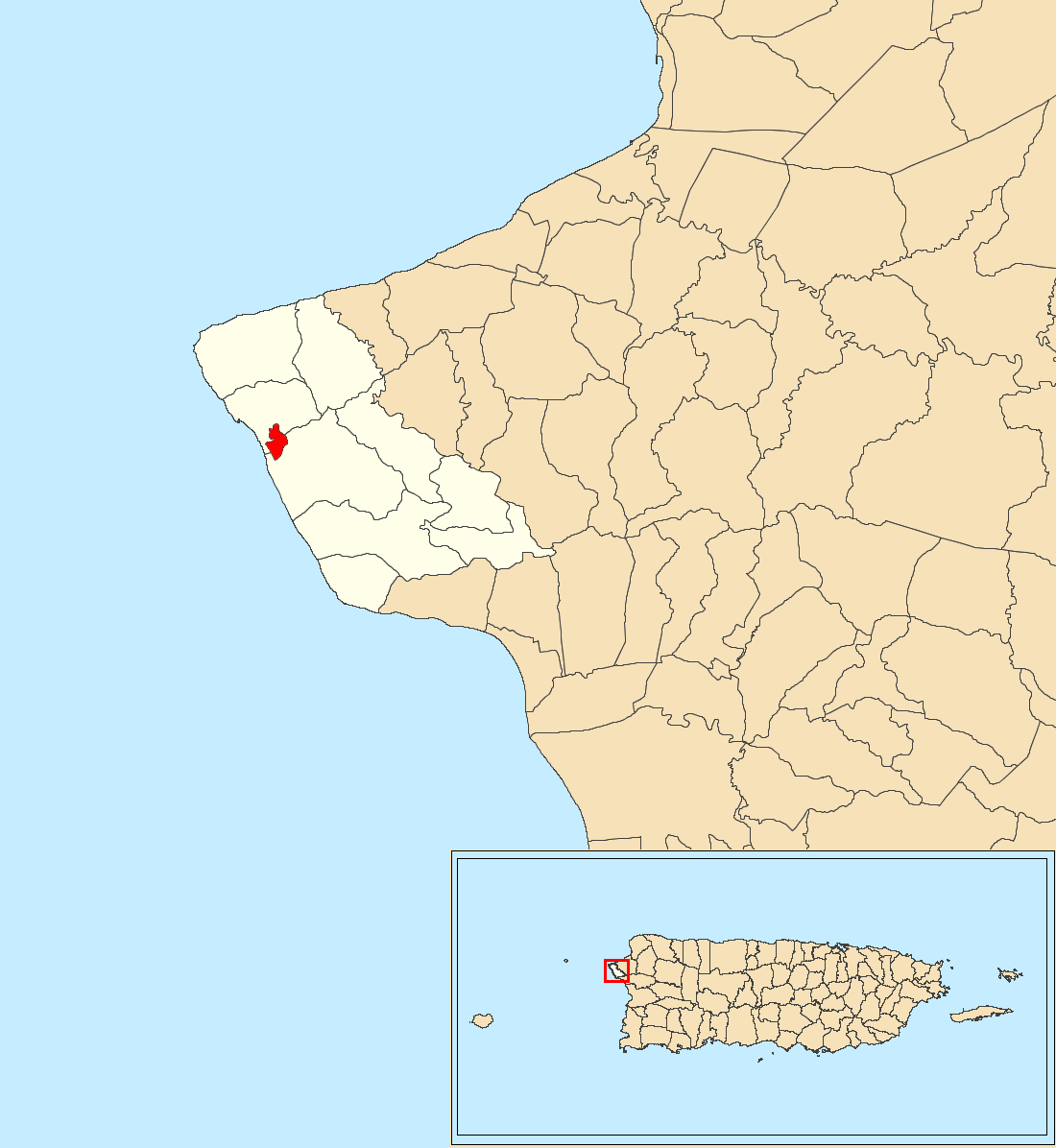
- Location of Rincón barrio-pueblo within the municipality of Rincón shown in red

- Location of Puerto Rico
- Coordinates: 18°20′20″N 67°15′03″W
- Commonwealth: Puerto Rico
- Municipality: Rincón

Area
  - Total: 0.12 sq mi (0.31 km^{2})
  - Land: 0.12 sq mi (0.31 km^{2})
  - Water: 0 sq mi (0 km^{2})
- Elevation: 26 ft (7.9 m)

Population (2010)
  - Total: 933
  - Density: 7,775/sq mi (3,002/km^{2})
- Source: 2010 Census
- Time zone: UTC−4 (AST)
- ZIP Code: 00677
- Area code: 787/939

Rincón barrio-pueblo is a barrio-pueblo, the administrative center (seat) of Rincón, a municipality of Puerto Rico. Its population in 2010 was 933.

As was customary in Spain, in Puerto Rico, the municipality has a barrio called pueblo which contains a central plaza, the municipal buildings (city hall), and a Catholic church. Fiestas patronales (patron saint festivals) are held in the central plaza every year.

== The central plaza and its church ==
The central plaza, or square, is a place for official and unofficial recreational events and a place where people can gather and socialize from dusk to dawn. The Laws of the Indies, Spanish law, which regulated life in Puerto Rico in the early 19th century, stated the plaza's purpose was for "the parties" (celebrations, festivities) (Spanish: a propósito para las fiestas), and that the square should be proportionally large enough for the number of neighbors (Spanish: grandeza proporcionada al número de vecinos). These Spanish regulations also stated that the streets nearby should be comfortable portals for passersby, protecting them from the elements: sun and rain.

Located across the central plaza in Rincón barrio-pueblo is the Parroquia Santa Rosa de Lima, a Roman Catholic church.

Historical population
| Census | Pop. | Note | %± |
|---|---|---|---|
| 1950 | 1,065 | | — |
| 1960 | 1,094 | | 2.7% |
| 1970 | 0 | | −100.0% |
| 1980 | 1,046 | | — |
| 1990 | 1,044 | | −0.2% |
| 2000 | 1,030 | | −1.3% |
| 2010 | 933 | | −9.4% |
U.S. Decennial Census; 1899 (shown as 1900) 1910-1930; 1930-1950 1980-2000 2010

== History ==
Rincón barrio-pueblo was in Spain's gazetteers until Puerto Rico was ceded by Spain in the aftermath of the Spanish–American War under the terms of the Treaty of Paris of 1898 and became an unincorporated territory of the United States. In 1899, the United States Department of War conducted a census of Puerto Rico finding that the population of Rincón barrio-pueblo, combined with Pueblo, was 1,074. The population was reported but combined with Pueblo until the 1950 census when it was reported separately, as 1,065. In July 2020, Federal Emergency Management Agency appropriated funds for repairs to Rincón's plaza.

== Sectors ==
Barrios (which are, in contemporary times, roughly comparable to minor civil divisions) in turn are further subdivided into smaller local populated place areas/units called sectores (sectors in English). The types of sectores may vary, from normally sector to urbanización to reparto to barriada to residencial, among others.

The following sectors are in Rincón barrio-pueblo:

Calle Benjamín Gómez, Calle Comercio, Calle del Parque, Calle Muñoz Rivera, Calle Nueva, Calle Progreso, Calle Unión, Cerro Los Pobres, Cerro Miramar, Condominio Santa Rosa Elderly, Residencial Santa Rosa, and Sector Sol.

== Gallery ==
Places in Rincón barrio-pueblo:

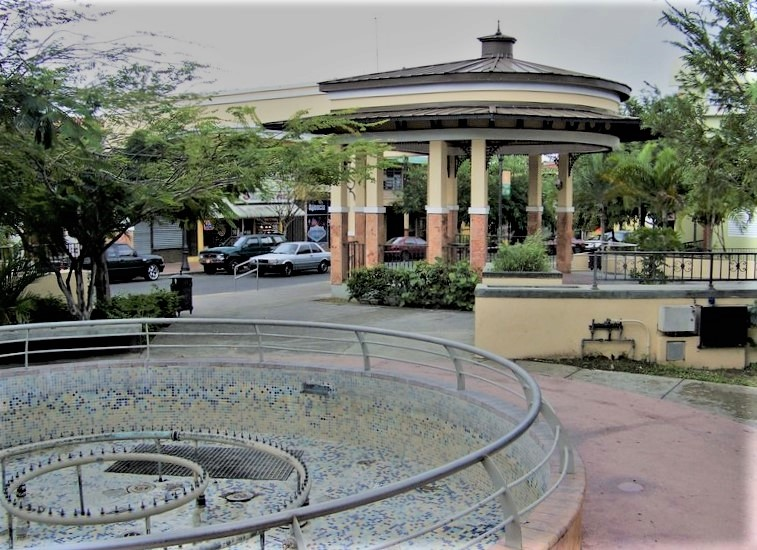
Plaza de Recreo in Rincón

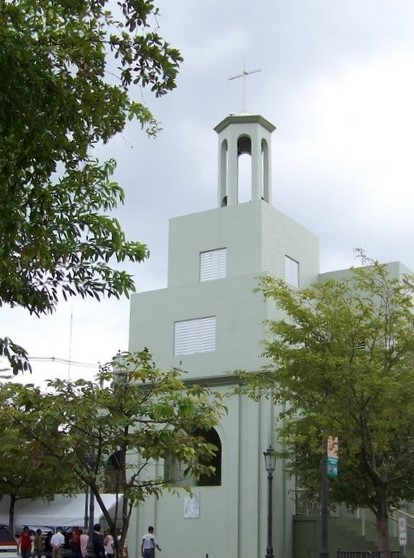
Parroquia Santa Rosa de Lima

== See also ==
- List of communities in Puerto Rico
- List of barrios and sectors of Rincón, Puerto Rico
