= List of barrios and sectors of Rincón, Puerto Rico =

Like all municipalities of Puerto Rico, Rincón is subdivided into administrative units called barrios, which are, in contemporary times, roughly comparable to minor civil divisions, (and means wards or boroughs or neighborhoods in English). The barrios and subbarrios, in turn, are further subdivided into smaller local populated place areas/units called sectores (sectors in English). The types of sectores may vary, from normally sector to urbanización to reparto to barriada to residencial, among others. Some sectors appear in two barrios.

== List of sectors by barrio ==
=== Atalaya ===
- Calle Los Vega
- Carretera 411
- Ramal 412
- Sector Delfín González
- Sector Justo Agrón
- Sector La Bandera
- Sector La Galleta

=== Barrero ===
- Carretera 115
- Carretera 429
- Condominio Sol y Playa
- Punta Cadena
- Sector La Mancha
- Sector La Playa
- The Villas at the Horned Dorset Primavera

=== Calvache ===
- Acres de Córcega
- Calle Ajacio
- Calle Bastia
- Calle Caleta Los Frailes
- Calle Calvi
- Calle Corte
- Calle El Cielo
- Calle Invierno
- Calle La Moca
- Calle Occhiatanna
- Calle Otoño
- Calle Poggio Doletta
- Calle Porto Vecchio
- Calle Primavera
- Calle Puesta del Sol
- Calle Rue de Córsica
- Calle Verano
- Carretera 115
- Carretera 411
- Comunidad Agrícola Bianchi
- Comunidad Calvache
- Condominio Córcega Apartments
- Condominio Costa Córcega
- Condominio Las Coronas
- Condominio Los Almendros
- Condominio Pelican Reef
- Condominio Rincón Ocean Club I y II
- Condominio Victoria del Mar
- Cruces Nuevas
- Sector Benito González
- Sector Campo Alegre
- Sector Córcega
- Sector El Salto (El Último Brinco)
- Sector Hacienda Juanita
- Sector La Jalda o Camino Anselmo
- Sector Las Lomas
- Sector Los Muelles
- Sector Palatine Hill
- Sector Pico Carrero
- Sector Toño Olán
- Urbanización Valle Escondido

=== Cruces ===
- Carretera 412
- Cruz Medio
- Sector Danubio
- Sector Emiliano González
- Sector Feliciano
- Sector Juan Soto
- Sector La Rincoeña
- Sector Los Gandía
- Sector Los Puentes
- Sector Mito Caro
- Sector Ríos
- Sector Rosado
- Sector Sierra Maestra
- Sector Soto
- Sector William Noriega Rodríguez

=== Ensenada ===
- Calle Gabino Tirado
- Calle Sol
- Camino José Pérez
- Carretera 115
- Carretera 413
- Colinas de Ensenada
- Condominio Arenas del Mar
- Condominio Bahía del Mar
- Condominio Chalet del Mar
- Condominio Costa Ensenada
- Condominio Ensenada del Mar
- Condominio Rincón By The Seas
- Condominio Rincón Ocean View
- Condominio Rincón Wave View
- Condominio Solymar
- Extensión Jardines de Rincón
- Parada Muñoz
- Sección Cambijas
- Sector Ensenada
- Sector Ismael Sánchez
- Sector Quintana
- Urbanización Jardines de Rincón
- Urbanización Vista Azul

=== Jagüey ===
- Carretera 411
- Carretera 412
- Jagüey Chiquito
- Ramal 4412
- Sector Colombani
- Sector Lucía Lorenzo
- Sector Suárez

=== Pueblo ===
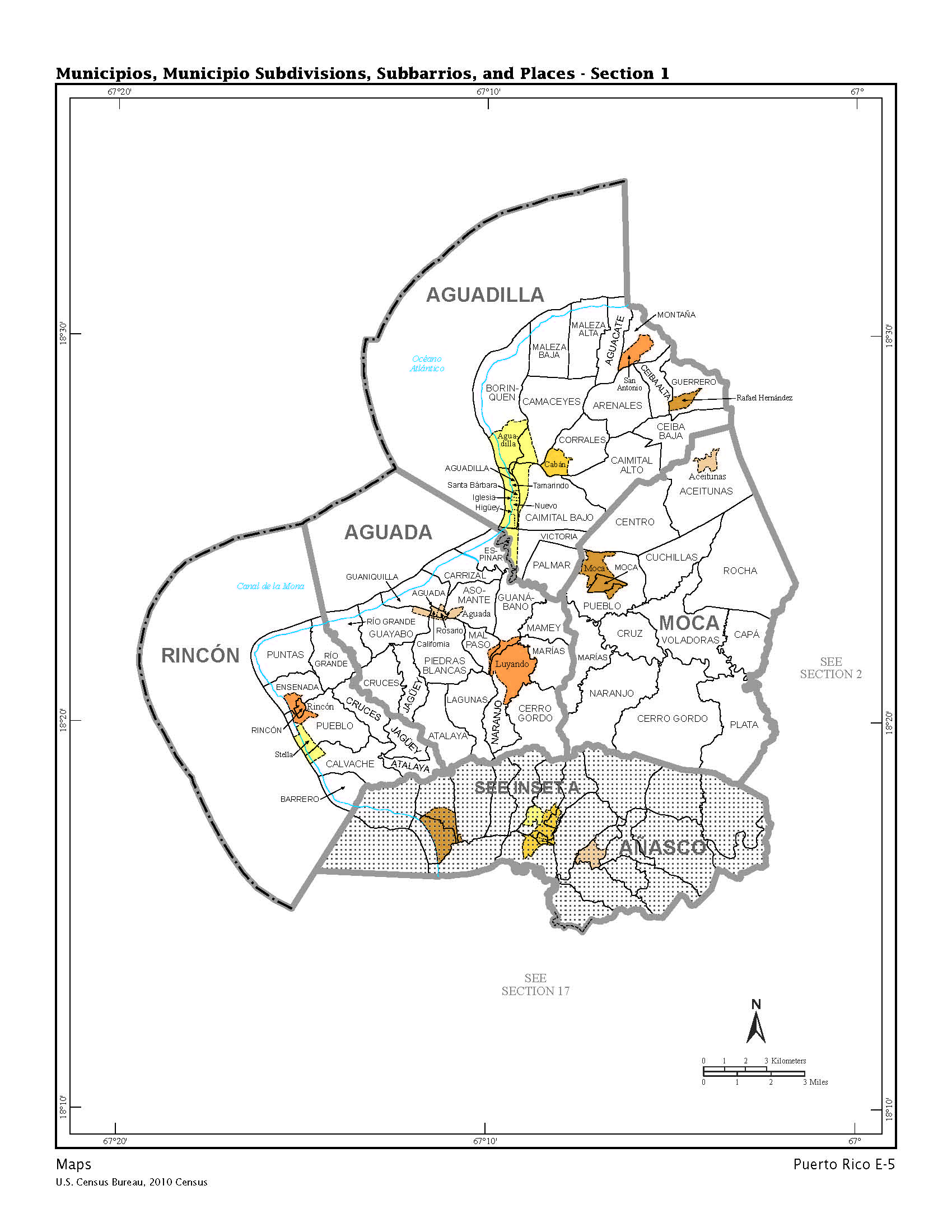
US 2010 census map of Municipios, Municipio Subdivisions, Subbarrios, and Places of Aguadilla, Aguada, Rincón, and Moca in Puerto Rico

- Avenida Albizu Campos
- Avenida Canal
- Avenida Vistamar
- Barrio Pueblo Rural
- Calle Borinquen Sea Beach Drive
- Calle Encanto
- Calle Fisherman Walk
- Calle Francisco Colón Guerra
- Calle Germán Chaparro Villanueva
- Calle Los Robles
- Calle Muñoz Rivera
- Calle Muñoz Rivera
- Calle Pelican Walk
- Calle Vistamar
- Camino Vistamar
- Carretera 115
- Carretera 412
- Carretera 414 (Camino Mortero)
- Cofresí Tower
- Comunidad Stella
- Condominio Coconut Court
- Condominio Puerta del Sol
- Condominio Puesta del Sol
- Condominio Sea Beamorrench Village
- Condominio Stella del Mar
- Extensión Los Robles
- Reparto Matías
- Sector El Coquí
- Sector La Jalda o Camino Anselmo
- Sector Los Caobos
- Sector Maní
- Sector Muñoz
- Sector Soto
- Sector Vargas
- Sector Villa Rincón
- Sectores Korea
- Urbanización Colinas Monte y Mar
- Urbanización Sea Beach Colony
- Urbanización Villa Rincón
- Vertedero
- Villa Angélica
- Villa Cofresí
- Villas de la Pradera

=== Puntas ===
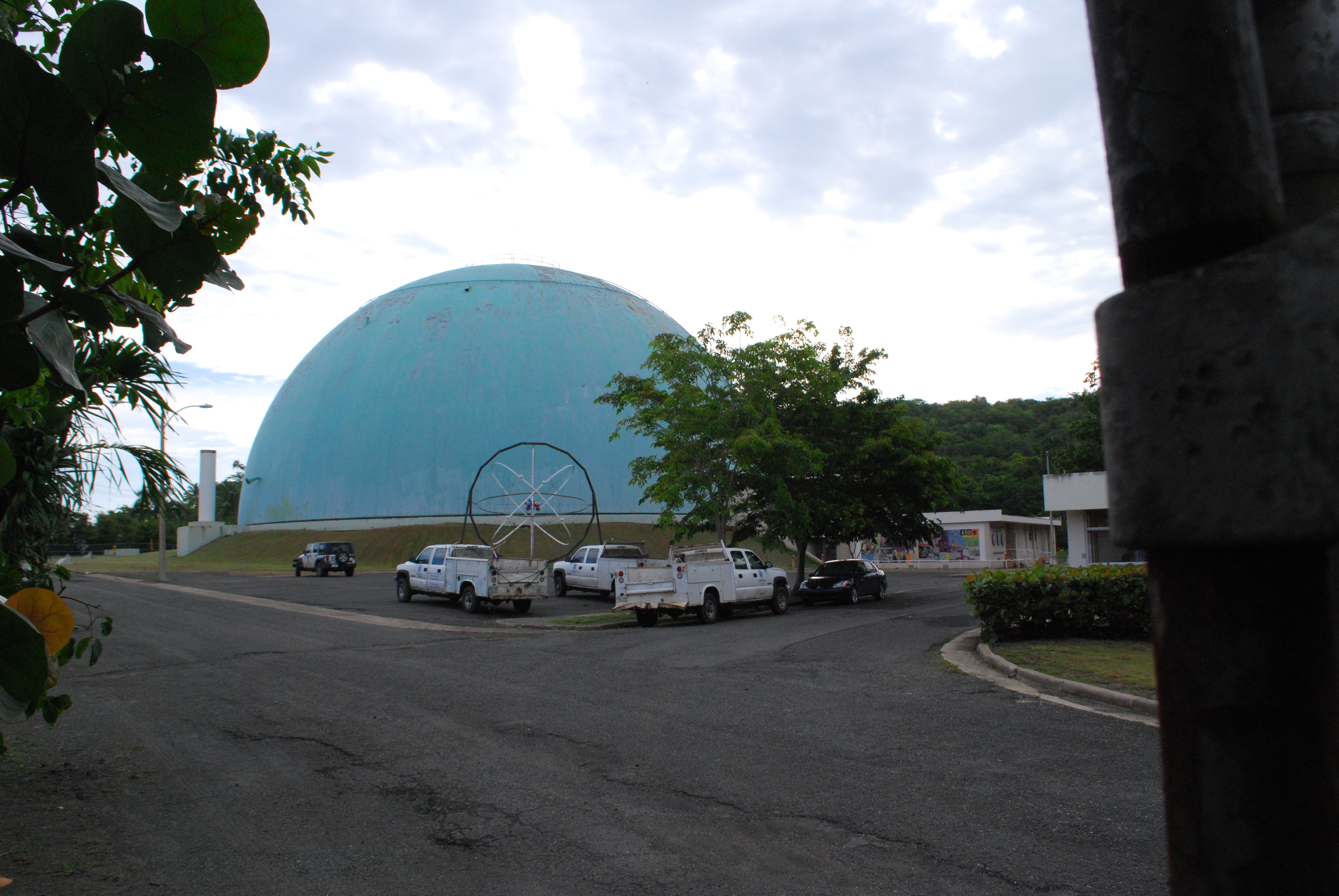
Boiling Nuclear Superheater (BONUS) Reactor Facility (also called the Museo Tecnológico BONUS Dr. Modesto Iriarte is at the end of PR-413, at Domes Beach in Punta Higüera sector

- Calle Boulevard
- Calle Colinas Lindas
- Calle Los Flamboyanes
- Camino Interior
- Camino Martillo
- Camino Vista Nuclear
- Carretera 413
- Centro Puntas
- Condominio Landing View Village
- Paseo Tirado Sánchez
- Punta Higüera
- Puntas Nuevas
- Ramal 413
- Sector Alfonso Arizmendi
- Sector Brisas
- Sector Buena Vista
- Sector Cielo Mar
- Sector Colinas Lindas
- Sector Collazo
- Sector Cuchillo de Piñas
- Sector Dominga Cardona
- Sector Ismael Sánchez
- Sector Los Cipreses
- Sector Los Flamboyanes
- Sector Trinitarias
- Sector Vereno
- Sector Vista Linda

=== Rincón barrio-pueblo ===
- Calle Benjamín Gómez
- Calle Comercio
- Calle del Parque
- Calle Muñoz Rivera
- Calle Nueva
- Calle Progreso
- Calle Unión
- Cerro Los Pobres
- Cerro Miramar
- Condominio Santa Rosa Elderly
- Residencial Santa Rosa
- Sector Sol

=== Río Grande ===
- Carretera 115
- Carretera 400
- Carretera 413
- Carretera 414 (Camino Mortero)
- Sector Arizona
- Sector Cuchillo de Piñas
- Sector Domingo Vargas
- Sector Lomas Los Gavilanes
- Sector Los Mangoes
- Sector Mingo Mela
- Sector Moreno
- Sector Pedro Rosado
- Urbanización Estancias de Río Grande
- Urbanización Palma Real
- Urbanización Punta del Mar Beach Village
- Urbanización Veredas de Río Grande

== See also ==
- List of communities in Puerto Rico
