= Anandroplana portoricensis =

Scientific classification
- Kingdom: Animalia
- Phylum: Platyhelminthes
- Order: Polycladida
- Suborder: Acotylea
- Family: Ilyplanidae
- Genus: Anandroplana
- Species: A. portoricensis

Binomial name
- Anandroplana portoricensis Hyman, 1955

Species of flatworm

Anandroplana portoricensis is a species of flatworm belonging to the family Ilyplanidae. It is found within Puerto Rico.

== Description ==
A. portoricensis is a large flatworm that can reach 32 mm in length, with an oval, elongate body. The front tip of the body is rounded, while the back is bluntly pointed. It is known to be colored a mottled grayish-brown.

== Distribution ==
A. portoricensis has been known to be found in Puerto Rico with the holotype being collected on Rincón beach, under flat rocks.
