= Anandroplana muscularis =

Scientific classification
- Kingdom: Animalia
- Phylum: Platyhelminthes
- Order: Polycladida
- Suborder: Acotylea
- Family: Ilyplanidae
- Genus: Anandroplana
- Species: A. muscularis

Binomial name
- Anandroplana muscularis Hyman, 1955

Species of flatworm

Anandroplana muscularis is a species of flatworm belonging to the family Ilyplanidae. It is found within Puerto Rico.

== Description ==
A. muscularis is about 17 mm in length, with an oval, elongate body. The tips of the body are rounded, and the margins are slightly ruffled. The species has both cerebral and tentacular eye clusters. When preserved, it is known to appear dark brown.

== Distribution ==
A. muscularis has been known to be found in Puerto Rico with the holotype being collected off Punta Puntilla, under a shell.
