= Ensenada (disambiguation) =

Ensenada is a city in Baja California, Mexico.

Ensenada (Spanish word meaning bay) may also refer to:

== Boats ==
- Ensenada 20, an American sailboat design

== Music ==
- "Ensenada (song)", 2025, by Sublime

== People ==
- N. Senada, a possible composer who is said to have collaborated with the rock band The Residents
- Marquis of Ensenada (1702–1781), a Spanish statesman

== Places ==
- Ensenada Municipality, a subdivision of the Mexican state of Baja California
- Ensenada, Buenos Aires, a city in Argentina
- Ensenada Partido, a subdivision of Buenos Aires Province, Argentina
- Ensenada, a small locality next to Puerto Varas, Chile
- Ensenada, New Mexico
- Ensenada, Guánica, Puerto Rico, a barrio
- Ensenada, Rincón, Puerto Rico, a barrio
- La Ensenada, Panama
