= Carlos López Bonilla =

Puerto Rican politician

Carlos D. López Bonilla

Mayor of Rincón
- In office January 14, 2001 – Present
- Preceded by: Rubén Caro Muñíz

Personal details
- Born: 1960 (age 65–66) Rincón, Puerto Rico
- Party: Popular Democratic Party (PPD)
- Spouse: Doris L. Soto Núñez
- Children: 2
- Education: Interamerican University of Puerto Rico at San Germán (BA)

Carlos D. López Bonilla is a Puerto Rican politician and the current mayor of Rincón, Puerto Rico. López is affiliated with the Popular Democratic Party (PPD) and has served as mayor since 2001, retaining the lead over two decades with the support of an established political base. He earned a Bachelor of Arts from the Interamerican University of Puerto Rico at San Germán.

== Controversies ==
Fiscal and Administrative Irregularities

Mayor López Bonilla has been accused of serious administrative irregularities, including unauthorized disbursements of public funds, the latest of which detailed nearly a million dollars in asphalt related expenditure.

Environmental conservationists, surfing aficionados, community leaders, nonprofit organizations, as well as local merchants and concerned citizens have condemned and fiercely opposed a bike path of questionable legality along the coast. Experts and local academics have linked the project, which is funded by the Puerto Rico Department of Transportation and Public Works (ACT for its Spanish acronym), to a pattern of disastrous environmental policies and neglect of basic maintenance practices. The public has previously decried seemingly obscure motivations for permitting environmentally harmful initiatives in the municipality; however, it is widely recognized that the issue reflects a broader crisis in the Archipielago.

Escalating Tensions

The turmoil associated with community backlash to abrupt tree cutting, as well as unmet demands for documentation have led to lawsuits and intense protests. These demonstrations were at times met by riot police, who unleashed a show of force involving tear gas and arrests against demonstrators. Manifestations against Mayor Lopez Bonilla, ACT and Tamrio in Rincón have been portrayed as peaceful by the general public, legal observers and independent news media—yet, armed forces, defended the construction activities by to the amazement of spectators online and on the ground. Though the organization has refrained from making public statement about the sensitive situation unfolding in the tow, a potential threat to civil rights was identified by Amnesty International, leading the group to help community leaders educate citizens regarding those rights.

The Tamrio, Inc. Standoff

The heated clashes between the private construction company Tamrio, Inc., have reportedly been backed by partisan authorities and government agencies with little oversight and accountability. Community members opposing the construction of a bike path continue to lament the felling of native trees planted for erosion control and have expressed their intent to continue resisting the alteration to the coastline beloved to internal and external tourists alike.

Environmental experts have also predicted a high potential for the path to destroy sensitive aquatic ecosystems and to endanger marine life in the protected reserve of Tres Palmas, a consequence exemplified in other municipalities with similar construction plans. The path is based on a decades-old delimitation of the maritime zone, in beaches dramatically impacted by the brutal Category-4 forces of Hurricane Maria. The massive storm search severely advance coastal erosion, leaving several structures crumbled into the sea.

A recent discovery implicating the owners of Tamrio in a federal law suit pointed to a settlement in bank fraud accusations. The findings led community workers to express deep concern for the trust that Mayor Lopez Bonilla bestowed upon the company, by allowing them perform work under his jurisdiction.
