= Zygantrella =

Scientific classification
- Kingdom: Animalia
- Phylum: Platyhelminthes
- Order: Polycladida
- Suborder: Acotylea
- Family: Ilyplanidae
- Genus: Zygantrella
- Species: Z. queenslandensis

Binomial name
- Zygantrella queenslandensis Beveridge, 2018

Genus of flatworm

Zygantrella is a genus of flatworm belonging to the family Ilyplanidae. It is monotypic, containing the sole species Zygantrella queenslandensis. It is found within Australia.

== Description ==
Members of Zygantrella have an oval-shaped body, with cerebral tentacles, and eyes in both cerebral and tentacular clusters. The pharynx is folded and plicate. The ejaculatory duct is convoluted. The penis is armed with a stylet, and the seminal vesicle is muscular.

Zygantrella queenslandensis is able to reach 26 mm in length. The body is a pale cream colour, but the pharynx is brown.

== Distribution ==
Zygantrella queenslandensis is known to be found in Australia, within the state of Queensland. It has been observed off the coast of the city of Bowen, in Moreton Bay off the coast of Wellington Point, and in Rowes Bay.
