= Euilyoida =

Scientific classification
- Kingdom: Animalia
- Phylum: Platyhelminthes
- Order: Polycladida
- Suborder: Acotylea
- Family: Ilyplanidae
- Genus: Euilyoida; Faubel, 1983

Genus

Euilyoida is a genus of flatworms belonging to the family Ilyplanidae.

== Species ==
The following species are recognized in Euilyoida:

- Euilyoida malagasensis (Doignon, Artois & Deheyn, 2003)
- Euilyoida takewakii (Kato, 1935)
