= Anandroplana =

Scientific classification
- Domain: Eukaryota
- Kingdom: Animalia
- Phylum: Platyhelminthes
- Order: Polycladida
- Family: Ilyplanidae
- Genus: Anandroplana; Hyman, 1955

Species
- Anandroplana muscularis Hyman, 1955; Anandroplana portoricensis Hyman, 1955

Flstworms genus

Anandroplana is a genus of flatworms belonging to the family Ilyplanidae.

== Description ==
Members of Anandroplana were originally differentiated by Libbie Hyman; species are oval and elongate and shape, and have an encircling band of marginal eyes. The pharynx is long and ruffled, with the muscular male apparatus close behind. There is no seminal vesicle, prostatic vesicle or penis papilla.
