= Cruces, Rincón, Puerto Rico =

Barrio of Puerto Rico

Cruces
- Barrio
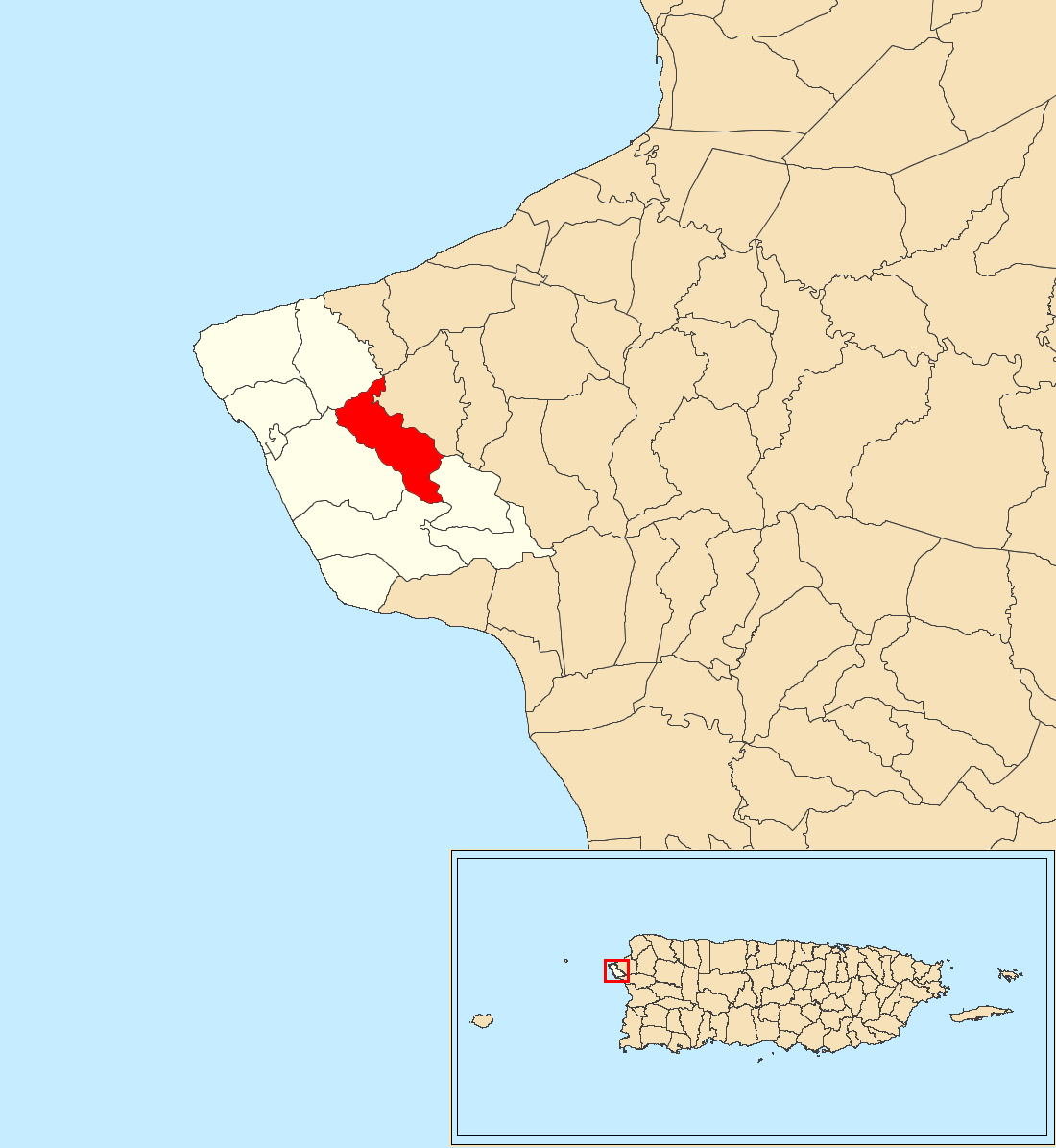
- Location of Cruces within the municipality of Rincón shown in red

- Location of Puerto Rico
- Coordinates: 18°20′21″N 67°13′19″W
- Commonwealth: Puerto Rico
- Municipality: Rincón

Area
  - Total: 1.49 sq mi (3.9 km^{2})
  - Land: 1.49 sq mi (3.9 km^{2})
  - Water: 0 sq mi (0 km^{2})
- Elevation: 322 ft (98 m)

Population (2020)
  - Total: 1,455
  - Density: 977/sq mi (377/km^{2})
- Source: 2020 Census
- Time zone: UTC−4 (AST)
- ZIP Code: 00677
- Area code: 787/939

Cruces is a barrio in the municipality of Rincón, Puerto Rico. Its population in 2010 was 1,455.

== History ==
Cruces was in Spain's gazetteers until Puerto Rico was ceded by Spain in the aftermath of the Spanish–American War under the terms of the Treaty of Paris of 1898 and became an unincorporated territory of the United States. In 1899, the United States Department of War conducted a census of Puerto Rico finding that the population of Cruces barrio was 770.

Historical population
Census	Pop.	Note	%±
1900	770		—
1910	741		−3.8%
1920	984		32.8%
1930	1,140		15.9%
1940	1,221		7.1%
1950	894		−26.8%
1960	877		−1.9%
1970	512		−41.6%
1980	1,041		103.3%
1990	855		−17.9%
2000	1,296		51.6%
2010	1,417		9.3%
2020	1,455		2.7%
U.S. Decennial Census; 1899 (shown as 1900) 1910-1930; 1930-1950 1980-2000 2010

== Sectors ==
Barrios (which are, in contemporary times, roughly comparable to minor civil divisions) in turn are further subdivided into smaller local populated place areas/units called sectores (sectors in English). The types of sectores may vary, from normally sector to urbanización to reparto to barriada to residencial, among others.

The following sectors are in Cruces barrio:

Carretera 412, Cruz Medio, Sector Danubio, Sector Emiliano González, Sector Feliciano, Sector Juan Soto, Sector La Rincoeña, Sector Los Gandía, Sector Los Puentes, Sector Mito Caro, Sector Ríos, Sector Rosado, Sector Sierra Maestra, Sector Soto, and Sector William Noriega Rodríguez.

== See also ==
- List of communities in Puerto Rico
- List of barrios and sectors of Rincón, Puerto Rico
