= Atalaya, Rincón, Puerto Rico =

Barrio of Puerto Rico

Atalaya
- Barrio
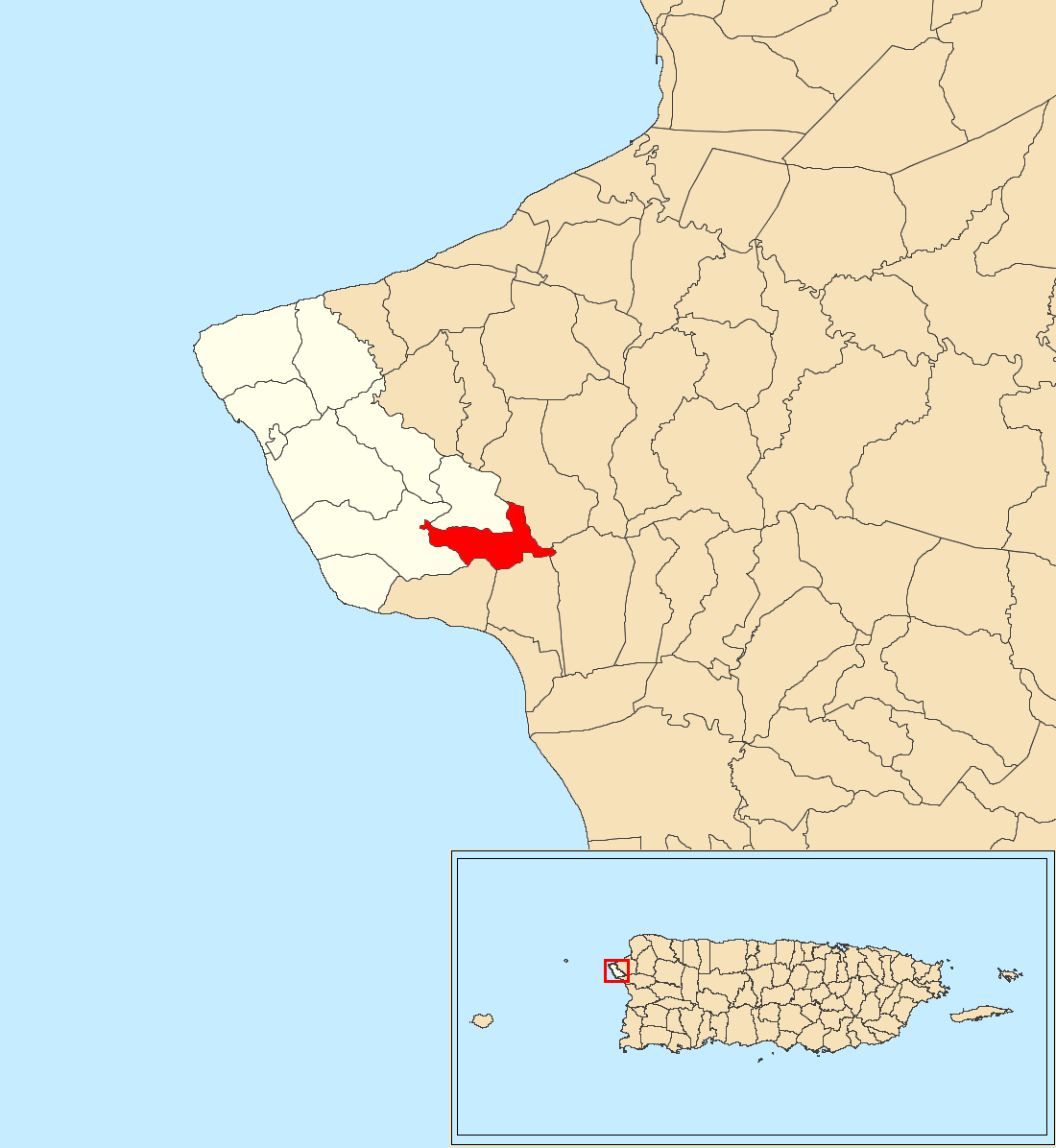
- Location of Atalaya within the municipality of Rincón shown in red

- Location of Puerto Rico
- Coordinates: 18°18′52″N 67°11′52″W
- Commonwealth: Puerto Rico
- Municipality: Rincón

Area
  - Total: 1.01 sq mi (2.6 km^{2})
  - Land: 1.01 sq mi (2.6 km^{2})
  - Water: 0 sq mi (0 km^{2})
- Elevation: 571 ft (174 m)

Population (2010)
  - Total: 956
  - Density: 946.5/sq mi (365.4/km^{2})
- Source: 2010 Census
- Time zone: UTC−4 (AST)
- ZIP Code: 00677
- Area code: 787/939

Atalaya is a barrio in the municipality of Rincón, Puerto Rico. Its population in 2010 was 956.

== History ==
Atalaya was in Spain's gazetteers until Puerto Rico was ceded by Spain in the aftermath of the Spanish–American War under the terms of the Treaty of Paris of 1898 and became an unincorporated territory of the United States. In 1899, the United States Department of War conducted a census of Puerto Rico finding that the combined population of Atalaya and Barrero barrios was 1,157.

Historical population
Census	Pop.	Note	%±
1910	467		—
1920	677		45.0%
1930	522		−22.9%
1940	672		28.7%
1950	727		8.2%
1960	656		−9.8%
1970	720		9.8%
1980	867		20.4%
1990	871		0.5%
2000	824		−5.4%
2010	956		16.0%
U.S. Decennial Census; 1900 (N/A) 1910-1930; 1930-1950 1980-2000 2010

== Sectors ==
Barrios (which are, in contemporary times, roughly comparable to minor civil divisions) in turn are further subdivided into smaller local populated place areas/units called sectores (sectors in English). The types of sectores may vary, from normally sector to urbanización to reparto to barriada to residencial, among others.

The following sectors are in Atalaya barrio:

Calle Los Vega, Carretera 411, Hoyo Caliente, Ramal 412, Sector Delfín González, Sector Justo Agrón, Sector La Bandera, and Sector La Galleta.

== See also ==
- List of communities in Puerto Rico
- List of barrios and sectors of Rincón, Puerto Rico
