= Jagüey, Rincón, Puerto Rico =

Barrio of Puerto Rico

Jagüey
- Barrio
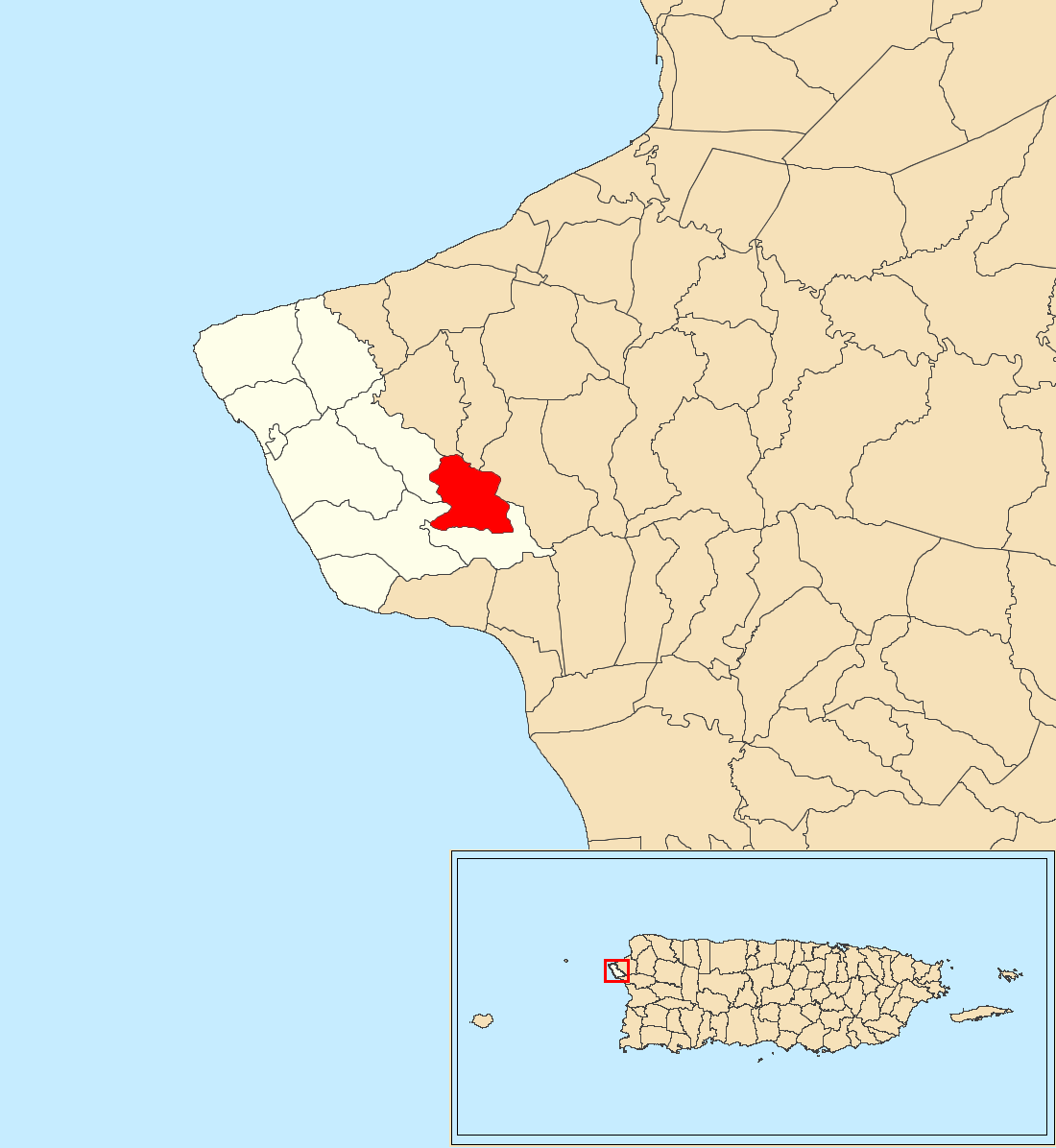
- Location of Jagüey within the municipality of Rincón shown in red

- Location of Puerto Rico
- Coordinates: 18°19′31″N 67°12′11″W
- Commonwealth: Puerto Rico
- Municipality: Rincón

Area
  - Total: 1.16 sq mi (3.0 km^{2})
  - Land: 1.16 sq mi (3.0 km^{2})
  - Water: 0 sq mi (0 km^{2})
- Elevation: 630 ft (190 m)

Population (2010)
  - Total: 702
  - Density: 605.2/sq mi (233.7/km^{2})
- Source: 2010 Census
- Time zone: UTC−4 (AST)
- ZIP Code: 00677
- Area code: 787/939

Jagüey is a barrio in the municipality of Rincón, Puerto Rico. Its population in 2010 was 702.

== History ==
Jagüey was in Spain's gazetteers until Puerto Rico was ceded by Spain in the aftermath of the Spanish–American War under the terms of the Treaty of Paris of 1898 and became an unincorporated territory of the United States. In 1899, the United States Department of War conducted a census of Puerto Rico finding that the population of Jagüey barrio was 576.

Historical population
| Census | Pop. | Note | %± |
|---|---|---|---|
| 1900 | 576 | | — |
| 1910 | 621 | | 7.8% |
| 1920 | 709 | | 14.2% |
| 1930 | 705 | | −0.6% |
| 1940 | 768 | | 8.9% |
| 1950 | 801 | | 4.3% |
| 1960 | 811 | | 1.2% |
| 1970 | 681 | | −16.0% |
| 1980 | 698 | | 2.5% |
| 1990 | 673 | | −3.6% |
| 2000 | 865 | | 28.5% |
| 2010 | 702 | | −18.8% |
U.S. Decennial Census; 1899 (shown as 1900) 1910-1930; 1930-1950 1980-2000 2010

== Sectors ==
Barrios (which are, in contemporary times, roughly comparable to minor civil divisions) in turn are further subdivided into smaller local populated place areas/units called sectores (sectors in English). The types of sectores may vary, from normally sector to urbanización to reparto to barriada to residencial, among others.

The following sectors are in Jagüey barrio:

Carretera 411, Carretera 412, Jagüey Chiquito, Ramal 4412, and Sector Colombani.

== See also ==
- List of communities in Puerto Rico
- List of barrios and sectors of Rincón, Puerto Rico
