= Barrero, Rincón, Puerto Rico =

Barrio of Puerto Rico

Barrero
- Barrio
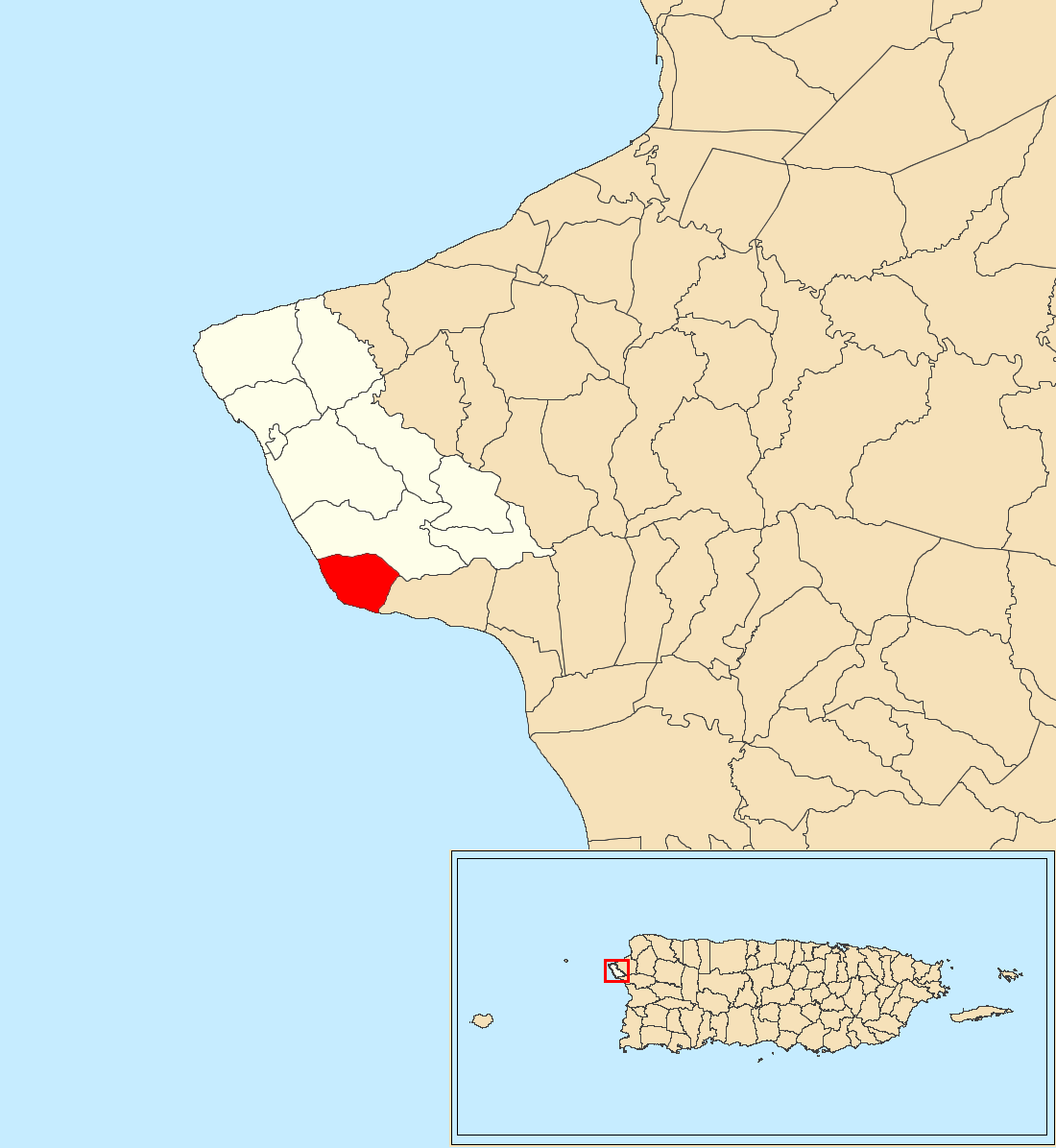
- Location of Barrero within the municipality of Rincón shown in red

- Location of Puerto Rico
- Coordinates: 18°18′11″N 67°13′41″W
- Commonwealth: Puerto Rico
- Municipality: Rincón

Area
  - Total: 1.09 sq mi (2.8 km^{2})
  - Land: 0.88 sq mi (2.3 km^{2})
  - Water: 0.21 sq mi (0.54 km^{2})
- Elevation: 157 ft (48 m)

Population (2010)
  - Total: 1,084
  - Density: 1,231.8/sq mi (475.6/km^{2})
- Source: 2010 Census
- Time zone: UTC−4 (AST)
- ZIP Code: 00677
- Area code: 787/939

Barrero Barrio is a barrio in the municipality of Rincón, Puerto Rico. Its population in 2010 was 1,084.

== History ==
Barrero was in Spain's gazetteers until Puerto Rico was ceded by Spain in the aftermath of the Spanish–American War under the terms of the Treaty of Paris of 1898 and became an unincorporated territory of the United States. In 1899, the United States Department of War conducted a census of Puerto Rico finding that the combined population of Barrero and Atalaya barrios was 1,157.

Historical population
Census	Pop.	Note	%±
1910	584		—
1920	689		18.0%
1930	786		14.1%
1940	632		−19.6%
1950	661		4.6%
1960	655		−0.9%
1970	690		5.3%
1980	781		13.2%
1990	870		11.4%
2000	1,019		17.1%
2010	1,084		6.4%
U.S. Decennial Census; 1900 (N/A) 1910-1930; 1930-1950 1980-2000 2010

== Sectors ==
Barrios (which are, in contemporary times, roughly comparable to minor civil divisions) in turn are further subdivided into smaller local populated place areas/units called sectores (sectors in English). The types of sectores may vary, from normally sector to urbanización to reparto to barriada to residencial, among others.

The following sectors are in Barrero barrio:

Carretera 115, Carretera 429, Condominio Sol y Playa, Punta Cadena, Sector La Mancha, Sector La Playa, and The Villas at the Horned Dorset Primavera.

== See also ==
- List of communities in Puerto Rico
- List of barrios and sectors of Rincón, Puerto Rico
