= Enterogonia =

Scientific classification
- Kingdom: Animalia
- Phylum: Platyhelminthes
- Order: Polycladida
- Suborder: Acotylea
- Family: Ilyplanidae
- Genus: Enterogonia; Haswell, 1907
- Species: E. pigrans

Binomial name
- Enterogonia pigrans Haswell, 1907

Genus of flatworms

Enterogonia is a genus of flatworm belonging to the family Ilyplanidae. It is monotypic, containing the sole species Enterogonia pigrans.
