= Crassandros =

Scientific classification
- Kingdom: Animalia
- Phylum: Platyhelminthes
- Order: Polycladida
- Suborder: Acotylea
- Family: Ilyplanidae
- Genus: Crassandros; Hyman, 1955
- Species: C. dominicanus

Binomial name
- Crassandros dominicanus Hyman, 1955

Genus of flatworm

Crassandros is a genus of flatworm belonging to the family Ilyplanidae. It is monotypic, containing the sole species Crassandros dominicanus. It is found on Dominica.

== Description ==
Species of Crassandros are oval in shape and lack tentacles, with both cerebral and tentacular eye clusters. The ejaculatory duct is heavily muscled.

C. dominicanus is around 11 mm in length, with a broad, oval shape. The color in life is unknown, but it is known to be brown when preserved.

== Distribution ==
C. dominicanus is known to be found on the island of Dominica, with the holotype being found in rock pools in the village of Marigot.
