= Ensenada, Rincón, Puerto Rico =

Barrio of Puerto Rico

Ensenada
- Barrio
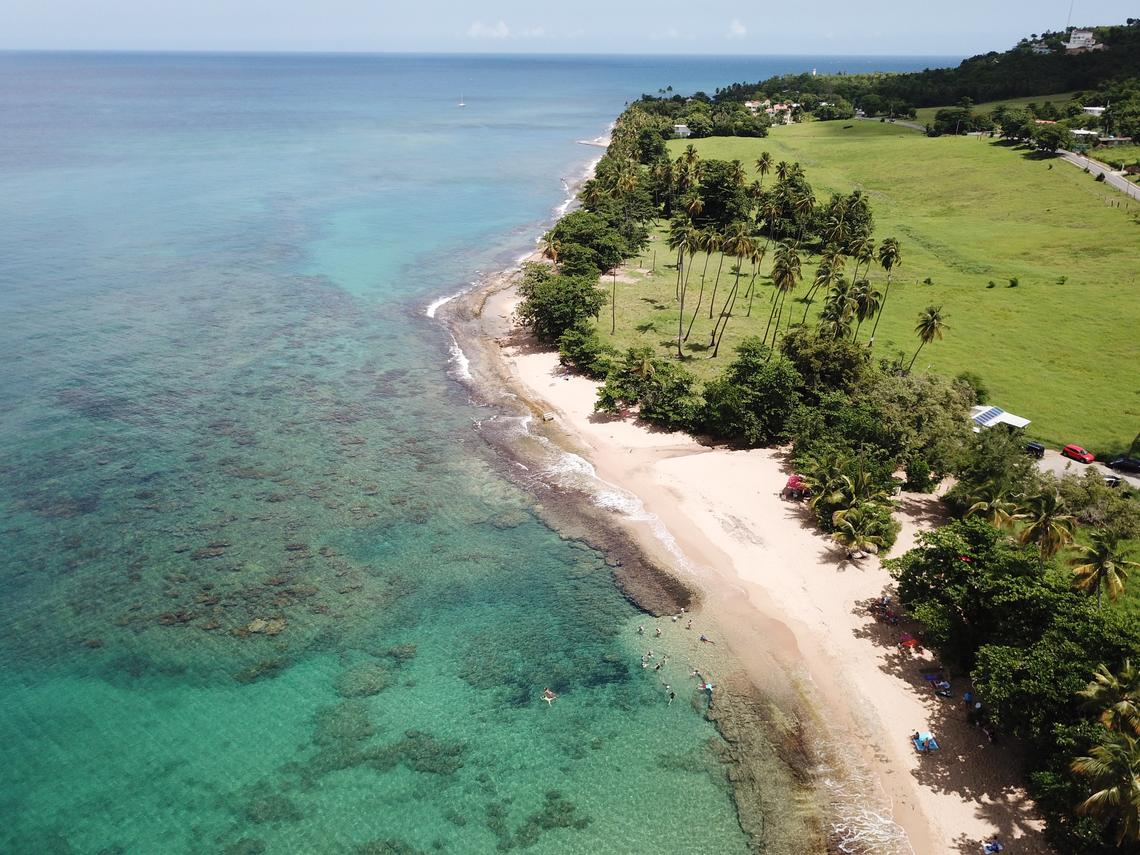
- Tres Palmas Marine Reserve in Ensenada

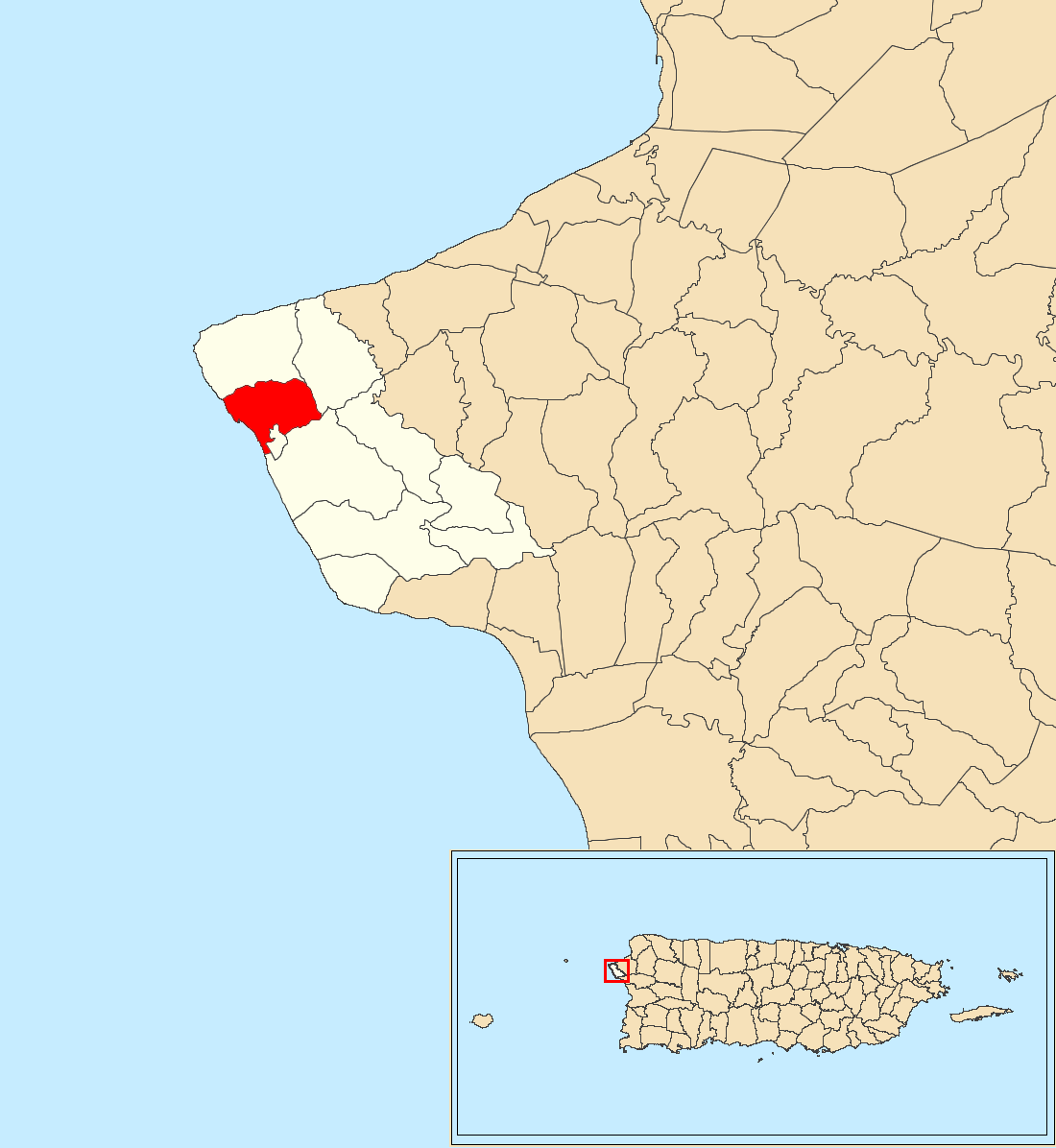
- Location of Ensenada within the municipality of Rincón shown in red

- Location of Puerto Rico
- Coordinates: 18°20′51″N 67°15′10″W
- Commonwealth: Puerto Rico
- Municipality: Rincón

Area
  - Total: 1.34 sq mi (3.5 km^{2})
  - Land: 1.09 sq mi (2.8 km^{2})
  - Water: 0.25 sq mi (0.65 km^{2})
- Elevation: 72 ft (22 m)

Population (2010)
  - Total: 1,328
  - Density: 1,218.3/sq mi (470.4/km^{2})
- Source: 2010 Census
- Time zone: UTC−4 (AST)
- ZIP Code: 00677
- Area code: 787/939

Ensenada is a barrio in the municipality of Rincón, Puerto Rico. Its population in 2010 was 1,328. Ensenada is on the western coast and is made up of about two dozen sectors. Steps Beach, popular with surfers, is located in The Tres Palmas Reserve, which is an area between Ensenada and Puntas in Rincón.

== History ==
Ensenada was in Spain's gazetteers until Puerto Rico was ceded by Spain in the aftermath of the Spanish–American War under the terms of the Treaty of Paris of 1898 and became an unincorporated territory of the United States. In 1899, the United States Department of War conducted a census of Puerto Rico finding that the population of Ensenada barrio was 674.

Historical population
| Census | Pop. | Note | %± |
|---|---|---|---|
| 1900 | 674 | | — |
| 1910 | 758 | | 12.5% |
| 1920 | 876 | | 15.6% |
| 1930 | 721 | | −17.7% |
| 1940 | 951 | | 31.9% |
| 1950 | 658 | | −30.8% |
| 1960 | 404 | | −38.6% |
| 1970 | 0 | | −100.0% |
| 1980 | 769 | | — |
| 1990 | 763 | | −0.8% |
| 2000 | 1,301 | | 70.5% |
| 2010 | 1,328 | | 2.1% |
U.S. Decennial Census; 1899 (shown as 1900) 1910-1930; 1930-1950 1980-2000 2010

== Features ==
Tres Palmas Reserve, established by a local initiative of fishermen, surfers and other community members is located on the coast of Ensenada and Puntas barrios.

== Sectors ==
Barrios (which are, in contemporary times, roughly comparable to minor civil divisions) in turn are further subdivided into smaller local populated place areas/units called sectores (sectors in English). The types of sectores may vary, from normally sector to urbanización to reparto to barriada to residencial, among others.

The following sectors are in Ensenada barrio:

Calle Gabino Tirado, Calle Sol, Camino José Pérez, Carretera 115, Carretera 413, Colinas de Ensenada, Condominio Arenas del Mar, Condominio Bahía del Mar, Condominio Chalet del Mar, Condominio Costa Ensenada, Condominio Ensenada del Mar, Condominio Rincón By The Seas, Condominio Rincón Ocean View, Condominio Rincón Wave View, Condominio Solymar, Extensión Jardines de Rincón, Parada Muñoz, Sección Cambijas, Sector Ensenada, Sector Ismael Sánchez, Sector Quintana, Urbanización Jardines de Rincón, and Urbanización Vista Azul.

== See also ==
- List of communities in Puerto Rico
- List of barrios and sectors of Rincón, Puerto Rico
