= Boiling Nuclear Superheater Reactor Facility =

Former nuclear power plant in Rincón, Puerto Rico

Boiling Nuclear Superheater (BONUS) Reactor Facility
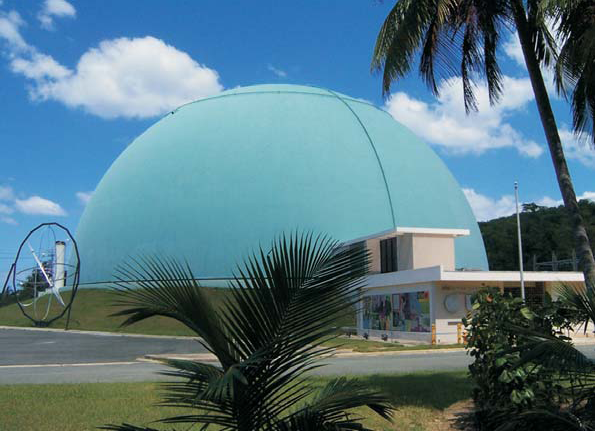
- BONUS Reactor
- Country: Puerto Rico
- Location: Punta Higuero Sector, PR 413, Rincón
- Coordinates: 18°21′59″N 67°16′7″W
- Status: Decommissioned
- Construction began: August 13, 1960
- Commission date: December 19, 1965
- Decommission date: June 1968
- Construction cost: $17,554,562
- Owners: US Atomic Energy Commission and Puerto Rico Water Resources Authority
- Operator: Puerto Rico Water Resources Authority

Nuclear power station
- Reactors: 1
- Reactor type: BWR
- Thermal capacity: 50 MW

Power generation
- Nameplate capacity: 16.5 MW

External links
- Website: www.lm.doe.gov/land/sites/pr/bonus/bonus.htm
- Commons: Related media on Commons
- Boiling Nuclear Superheater Reactor Facility
- U.S. National Register of Historic Places
- U.S. Historic district
- Built by: Chicago Bridge Co.; Gen Nuclear Engineering
- Architect: Atomic Energy Commission; Maxon Co.
- NRHP reference No.: 07001194
- Added to NRHP: November 14, 2007

The Boiling Nuclear Superheater (BONUS) Reactor Facility, also known to the locals as "Domes", or formally as Museo Tecnologico BONUS Dr. Modesto Iriarte, is a decommissioned nuclear power plant in Rincón, Puerto Rico. It was listed on the U.S. National Register of Historic Places in 2007.

== History ==
BONUS was a prototype whose objective was to assess the economic and technical feasibility of the integral boiling superheating advanced reactor concept. At the time, it was expected that developing higher-temperature reactors that could superheat steam was the next major step toward the achievement of a competitive status for nuclear power plants relative to fossil-fueled power plants. Incremental energy added to steam in the form of superheat can be converted to electricity with an efficiency of 50-60%, compared to ~30% for energy added to saturated steam in traditional reactors. The disadvantage of superheating is that higher temperatures can lead to more corrosion and fuel element failures, making the reactor more complex. BONUS was intended to identify whether or not the benefit was worth the challenge.

The construction of BONUS started in 1960, and the reactor had its first controlled nuclear chain reaction on April 13, 1964. In September 1965 full power operation was achieved with 50 MW thermal power, and steam temperatures of 900 °F (482 °C).

Operation of the BONUS reactor was terminated in June 1968 because of technical difficulties and the ensuing need for high-cost modifications. The Puerto Rico Water Resources Authority decommissioned the reactor between 1969 and 1970. During decommissioning, all special nuclear materials (fuel) and certain highly activated components (e.g., control rods and shims) were removed from the island to the US mainland, all piping systems were flushed, the reactor vessel and associated internal components within the biological shield were entombed in concrete and grout, and systems external to the entombment were decontaminated. Many contaminated and activated materials were placed in the main circulation pump room beneath the pressure vessel and entombed in concrete.

General decontamination of the reactor was performed with the goal of meeting unrestricted use criteria in all accessible areas of the building. Residual radioactive materials remaining in the structure were isolated or shielded to protect site visitors and workers. During subsequent years, more radioactive contamination was identified in portions of the building, and additional clean-up and shielding activities were conducted in the 1990s and early 2000s.

== Operation ==
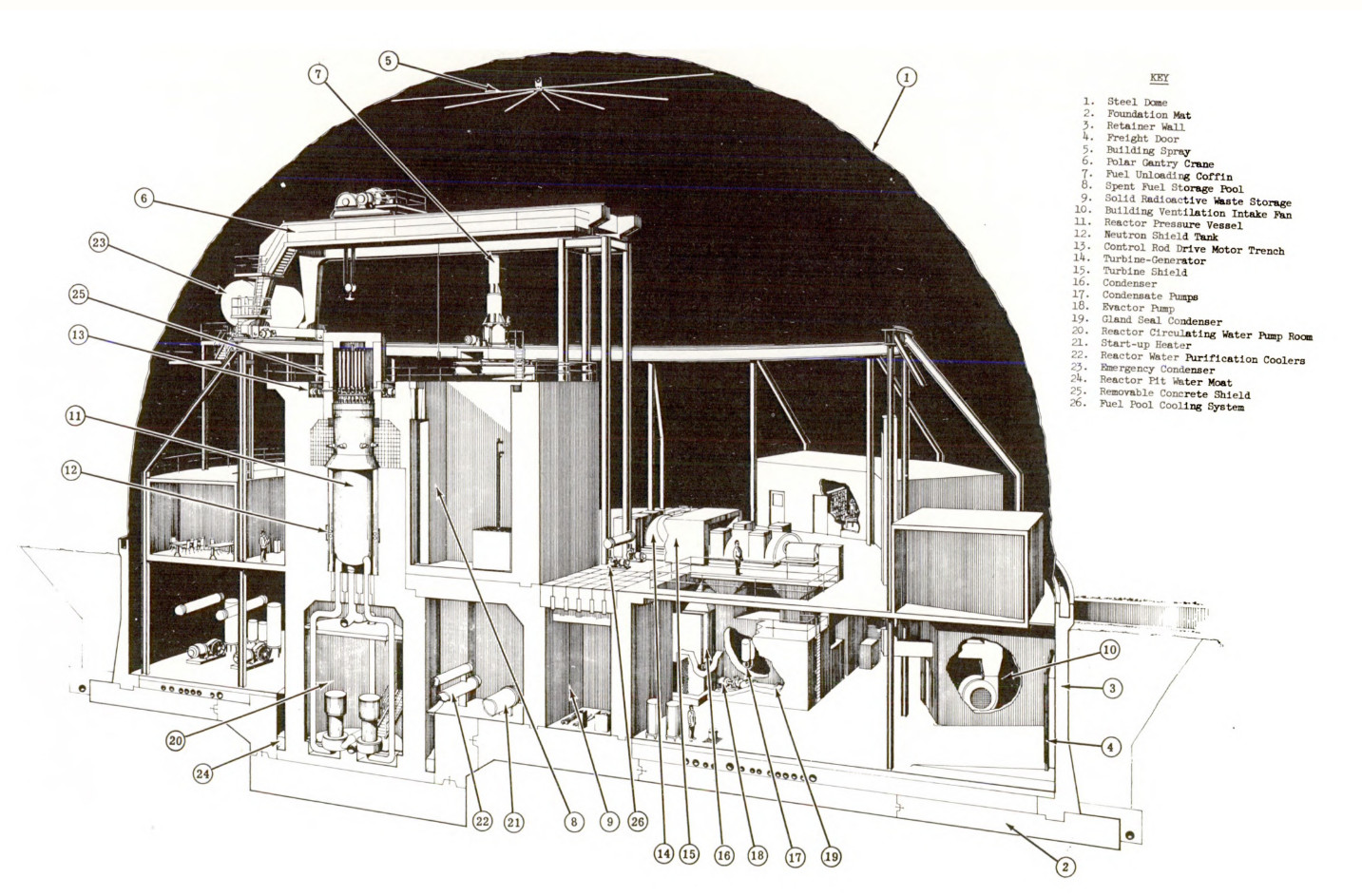
Perspective of the BONUS containment building in Puerto Rico

The principle of operation is boiling water in the center of the reactor, (BWR), and passing the steam through the rest of the reactor, superheating; this steam drives a turbine generator.
