= Domes Beach =

Beach in Rincón, Puerto Rico

Coordinates: 18.3641129°N 67.2701808°W

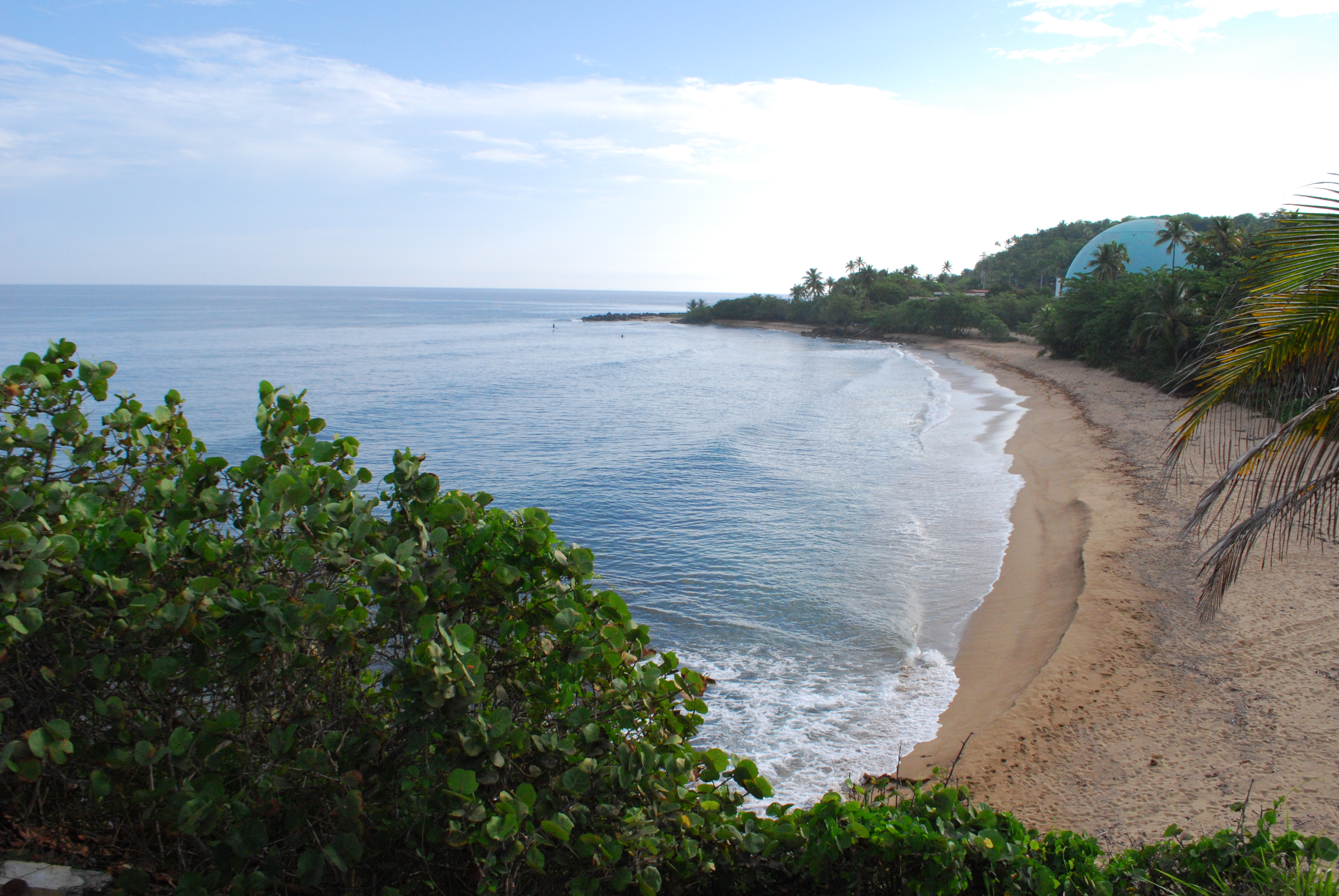
View of dome on Domes Beach, Rincón

Domes Beach (Playa Domes) is on the northwest point of Puerto Rico, in Rincón and known for big wave surfing during the winter. It is also known as Lighthouse Beach and Maria's Beach.

The beach is near a defunct nuclear facility called the Boiling Nuclear Superheater (BONUS) Reactor Facility. The beach is near the Punta Higuero Lighthouse.

Domes Beach in Rincón is considered a dangerous beach.

== Gallery ==
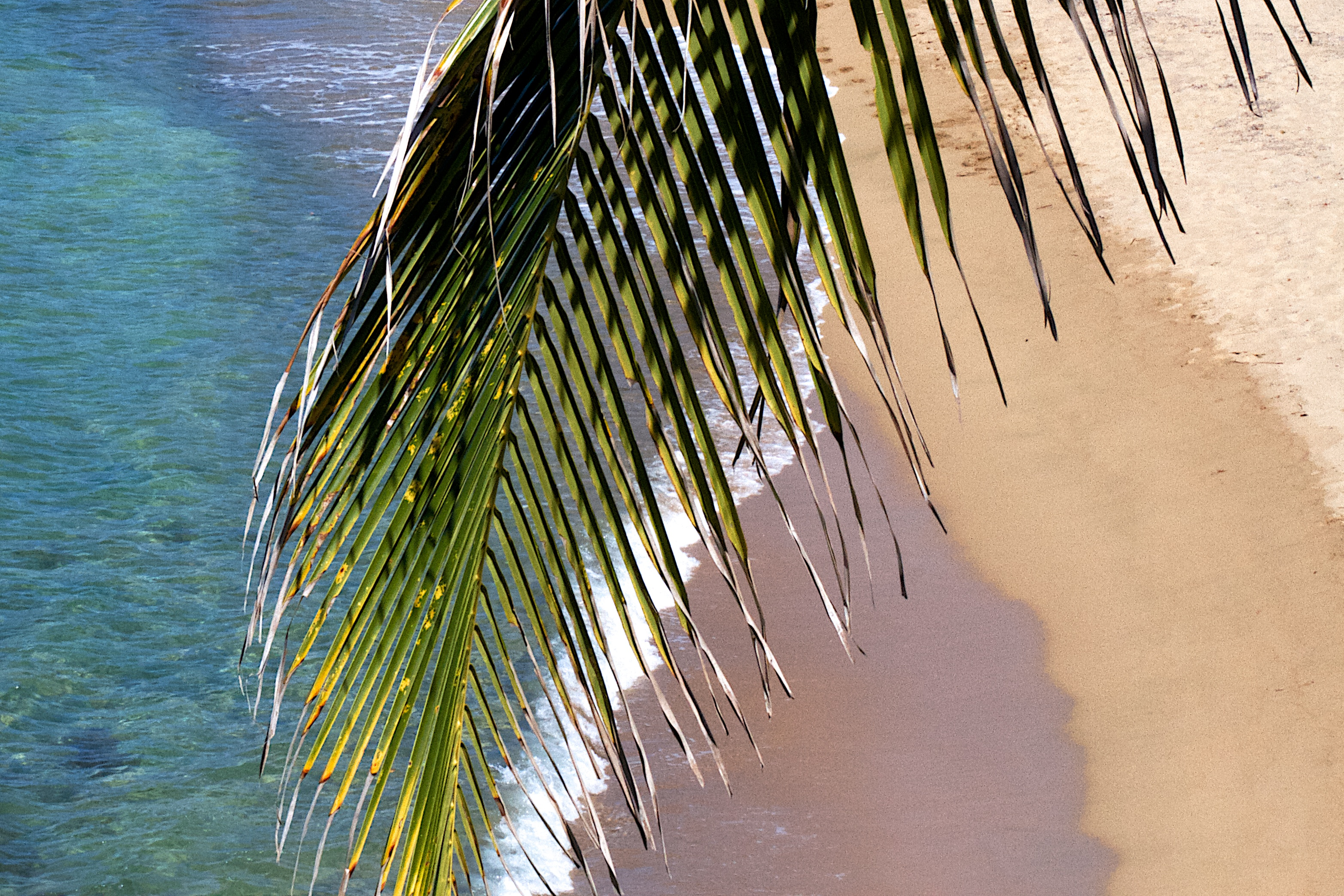
Domes Beach view from the Rincón lighthouse

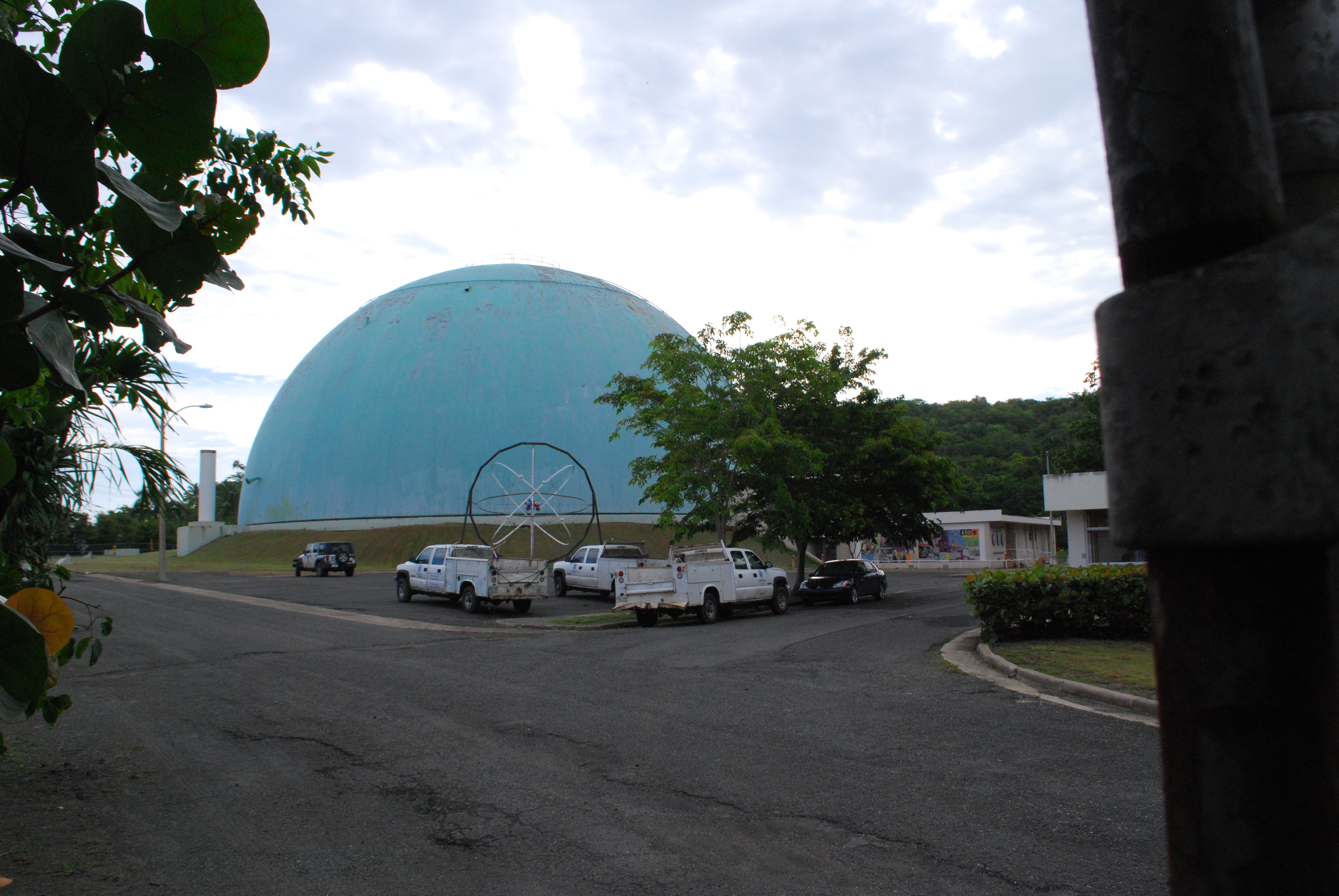
Close up of dome at Domes Beach

== See also ==
- List of beaches in Puerto Rico
