= Rincón, Puerto Rico =

Town and municipality in Puerto Rico

Rincón Municipio Autónomo de Rincón Santa Rosa de Rincón
- Town and Municipality
- Autonomous Municipality of Rincon
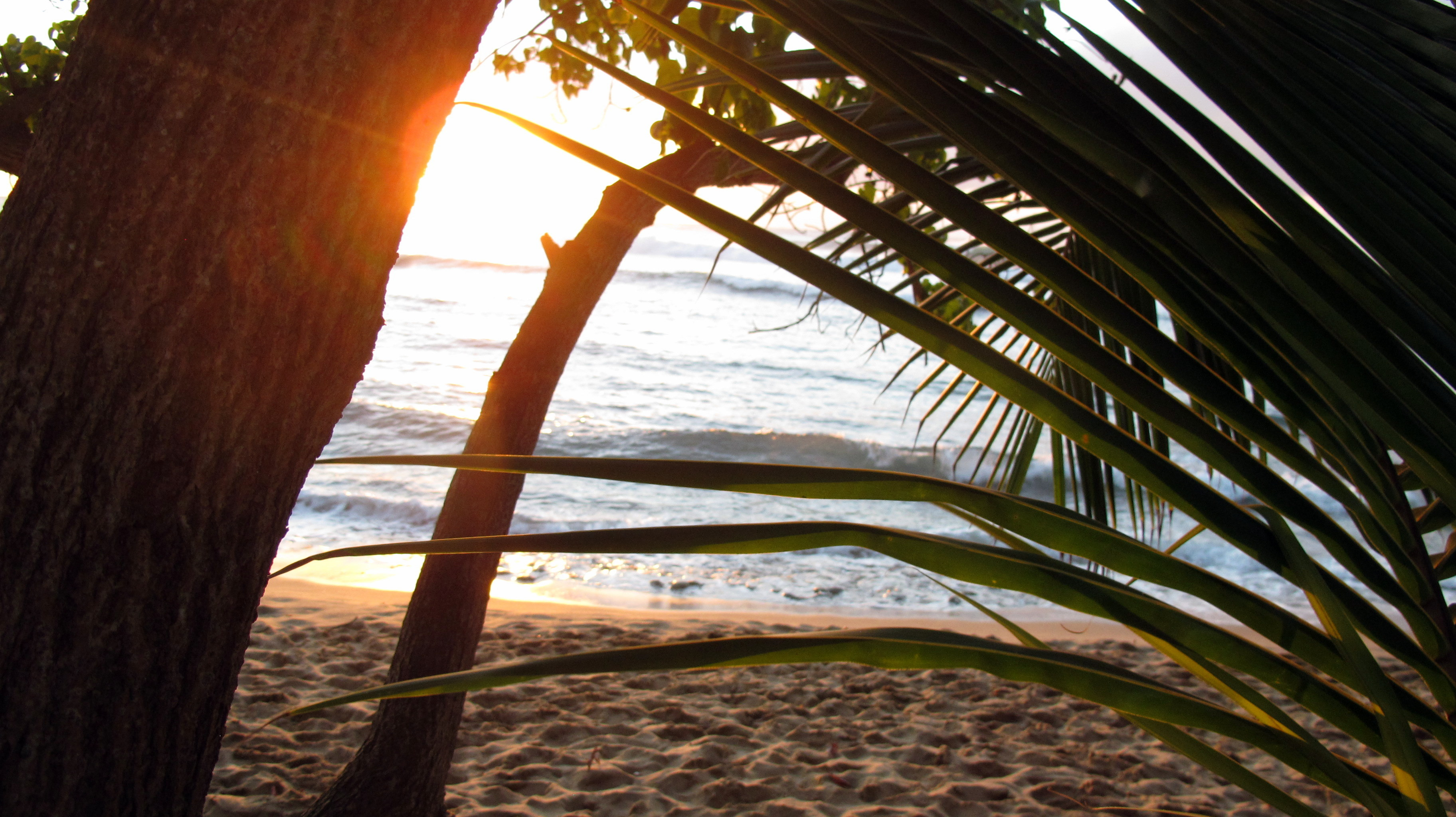
- Sunset at Maria's Beach in Rincón

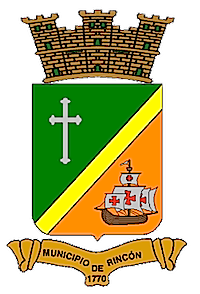
- Flag Coat of arms
- Nicknames: "El Pueblo de los Bellos Atardeceres", "Pueblo del Surfing"
- Anthem: "Rincón es mi pueblo querido"
- Map of Puerto Rico highlighting Rincón Municipality
- Coordinates: 18°20′25″N 67°15′06″W
- Sovereign state: United States
- Commonwealth: Puerto Rico
- Settled: 1770
- Founded: May 17, 1771
- Founder: Don Pablo de Arroyo
- Named for: Saint Rose of Lima and Don Gonzalo de Rincón the original landowner who allowed for the settlement, "Saint Rose of Rincon"
- Barrios: 10 barrios: Atalaya; Barrero; Calvache; Cruces; Ensenada; Jagüey; Pueblo; Puntas; Rincón barrio-pueblo; Río Grande

Government
  - Mayor: Carlos López Bonilla (PPD)
  - Senatorial dist.: 4 – Mayagüez
  - Representative dist.: 18

Area
  - Total: 29.39 sq mi (76.12 km^{2})
  - Land: 14 sq mi (36 km^{2})
  - Water: 15.49 sq mi (40.12 km^{2})

Population (2020)
  - Total: 15,187
  - Estimate (2025): 15,582 ▲
  - Rank: 69th in Puerto Rico
  - Density: 1,100/sq mi (420/km^{2})
- Demonym: Rincoeños
- Time zone: UTC-4 (AST)
- ZIP Code: 00677
- Area code: 787/939
- Website: www.rincon.org

Rincón (Spanish pronunciation: [riŋˈkon]; Spanish for 'Corner') is a popular beach town and municipality of Puerto Rico founded in 1771 by Don Luis de Añasco, who previously founded Añasco in 1733. It is located in the Western Coastal Valley, west of Añasco and Aguada. Rincón is spread over 9 barrios and Rincón Pueblo (the downtown area and the administrative center of the city). It is part of the Aguadilla-Isabela-San Sebastián Metropolitan Statistical Area.

The municipality is home to many of the surfing beaches in Puerto Rico, including Domes, Marias, Tres Palmas, Sandy Beach, Pools Beach, Córcega Beach and Rincón Town Beach. The word "Rincón" means "nook" in Castilian Spanish. Rincón is in the north, on the westernmost tip of Puerto Rico proper.

== History ==
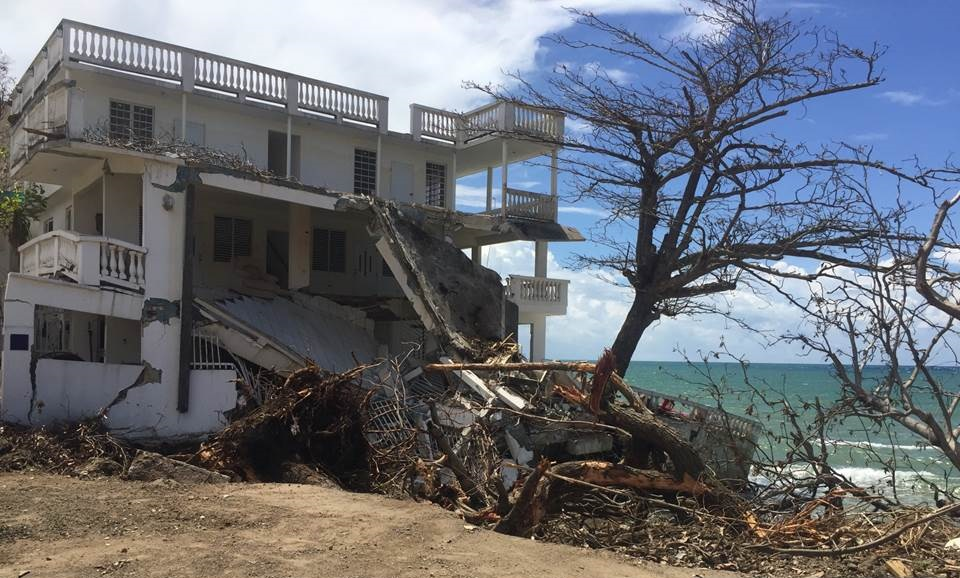
Home in Rincón destroyed by Hurricane Maria

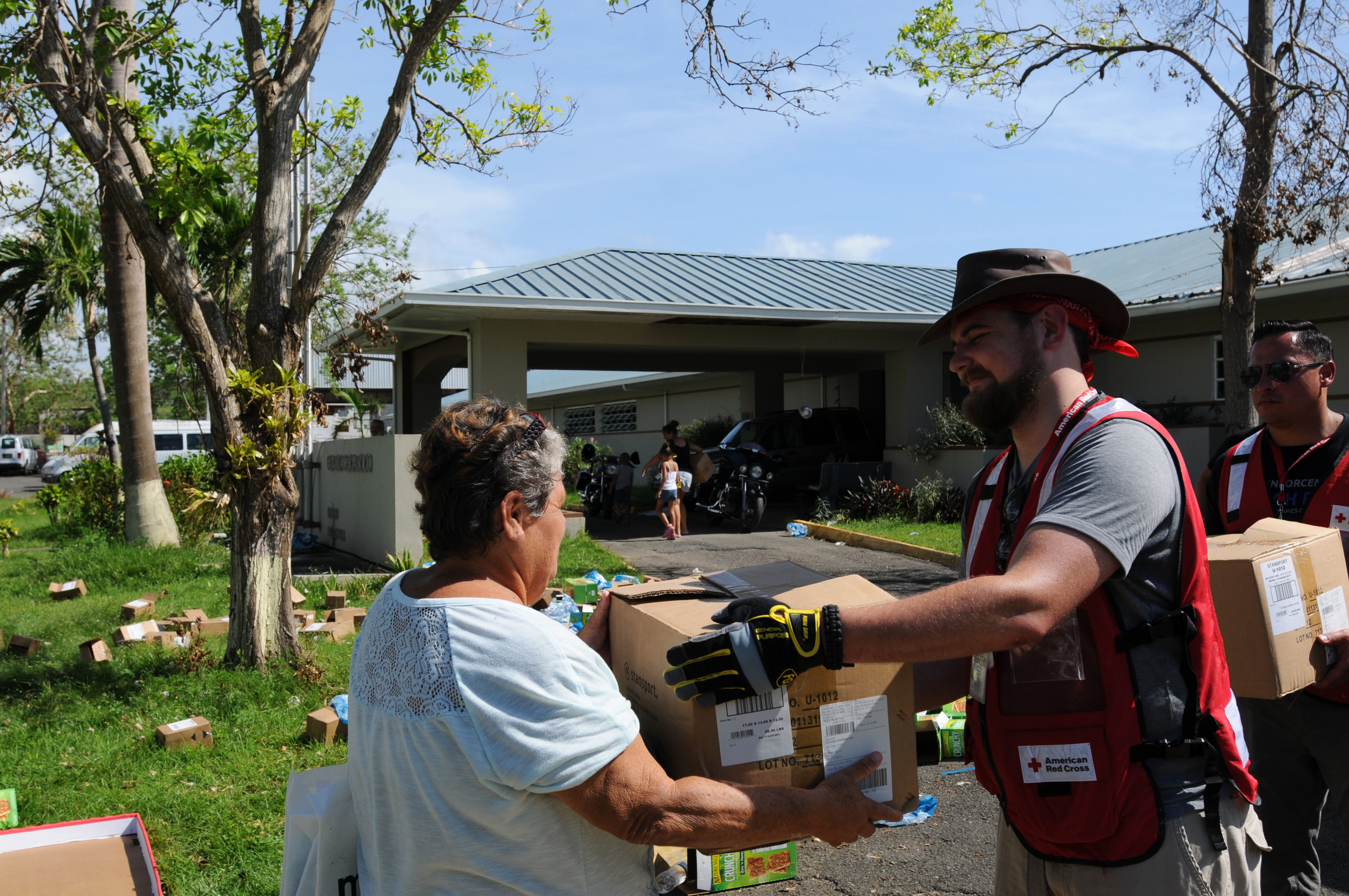
Hurricane Maria relief efforts in Rincón on October 15, 2017

Rincón was founded in 1771 by Don Luis de Añasco. In 1885, Benito Cumpiano was mayor of Ríncon and in 1890, Victor Cumpiano was Ríncon's mayor.

Puerto Rico was ceded by Spain in the aftermath of the Spanish–American War under the terms of the Treaty of Paris of 1898 and became a territory of the United States. In 1899, the United States Department of War conducted a census of Puerto Rico finding that the population of Rincón was 6,641.

On September 20, 2017 Hurricane Maria struck the island of Puerto Rico. In Rincón, infrastructure was damaged and about 400 homes were damaged or completely destroyed. Intense rainfall and winds triggered numerous landslides. The storm surge bought 4 feet of water into homes on the coast.

== Geography ==
Rincón is located on the western coast of Puerto Rico, on the westernmost tip.

Rincón Aerial Panorama

Updated flood zone maps (as of 2019) show that Rincón is extremely vulnerable to flooding, along with Humacao, Toa Baja, Barceloneta, and Corozal. For its high levels of erosion, Rincón is vulnerable in the case of a major hurricane.

=== Barrios ===
Like all municipalities of Puerto Rico, Rincón is subdivided into barrios. The municipal buildings, main central square and large Catholic church are located in a downtown barrio referred to as "el pueblo".

1. Atalaya
2. Barrero
3. Calvache
4. Cruces
5. Ensenada
6. Jagüey
7. Pueblo, (not to be confused with Rincón barrio-pueblo)
8. Puntas
9. Rincón barrio-pueblo
10. Río Grande

=== Sectors ===
Barrios (which are like minor civil divisions) are further subdivided into smaller areas called sectores (sectors in English). The types of sectores may vary, from normally sector to urbanización to reparto to barriada to residencial, among others.

=== Special Communities ===
Comunidades Especiales de Puerto Rico (Special Communities of Puerto Rico) are marginalized communities whose citizens are experiencing a certain amount of social exclusion. A map shows these communities occur in nearly every municipality of the commonwealth. Of the 742 places that were on the list in 2014, the following barrios, communities, sectors, or neighborhoods were in Rincón: La Playa Sector in Barrero, Cerro Los Pobres, El Pico in Atalaya, Hoyo Caliente, and Parcelas Stella.

=== Bodies of water ===
- Gorges: Caño García, Quebrada Grande de Calvache, Quebrada Los Ramos, Quebrada Piletas, Punta Ensenada.
- River: Río Grande

== Economy ==
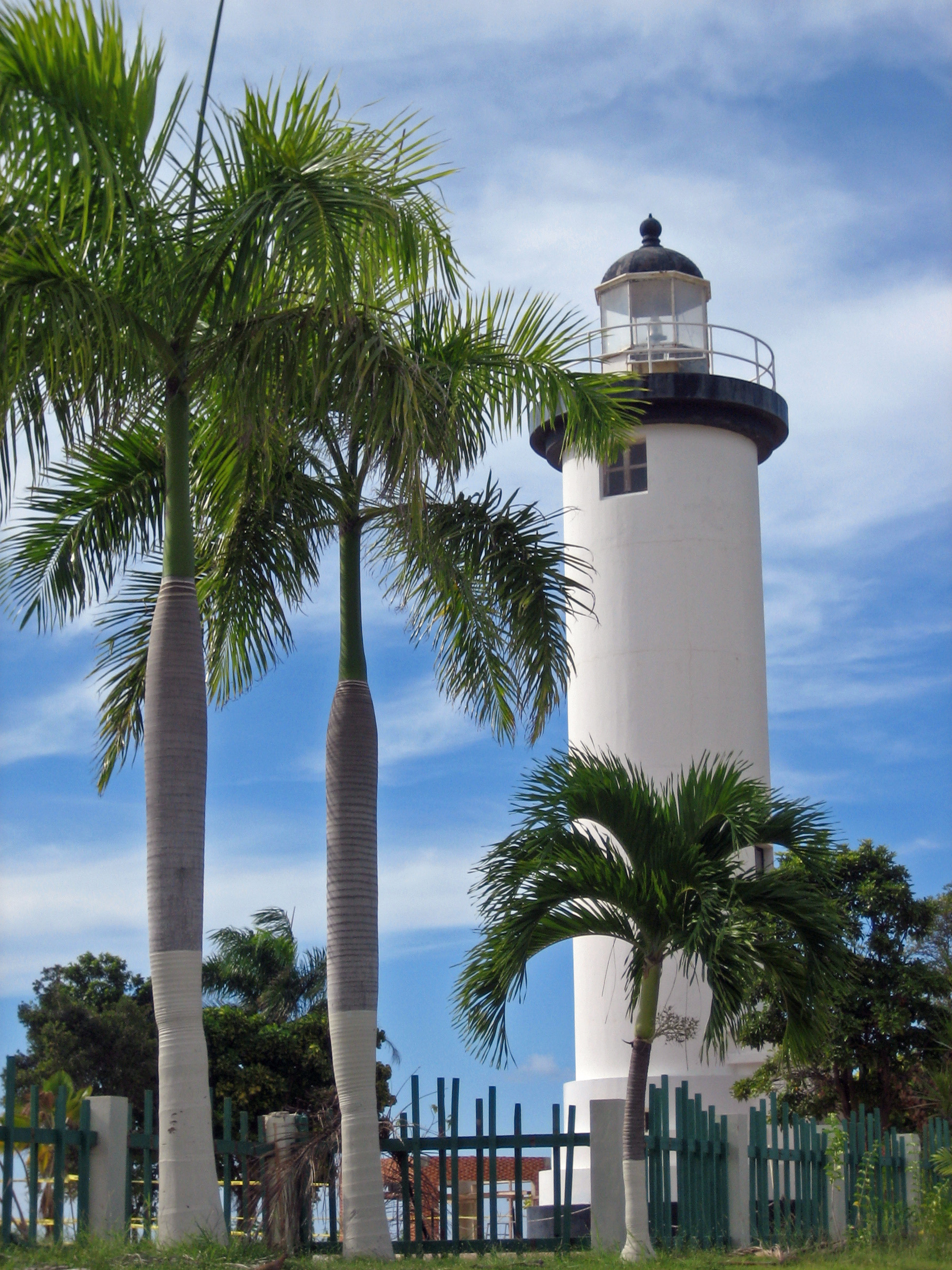
Punta Higüeras Lighthouse

The 1968 World Surfing Championship was held at Domes Beach in Rincón. Since then, surfers from around the world have been visiting Rincón.

Rincón has a tourism economy which also boasts scuba diving, snorkeling, and sunsets. Rincón has also been an area for internet-based companies to set up shop.

In 2007, Rincón was the site for the ISA World Masters where local surfer Juan Ashton won first place in the Masters division.

=== Agriculture ===
Fruits and sugarcane are the primary sources of agriculture in Rincón. Cattle ranching also is popular.

=== Industry ===
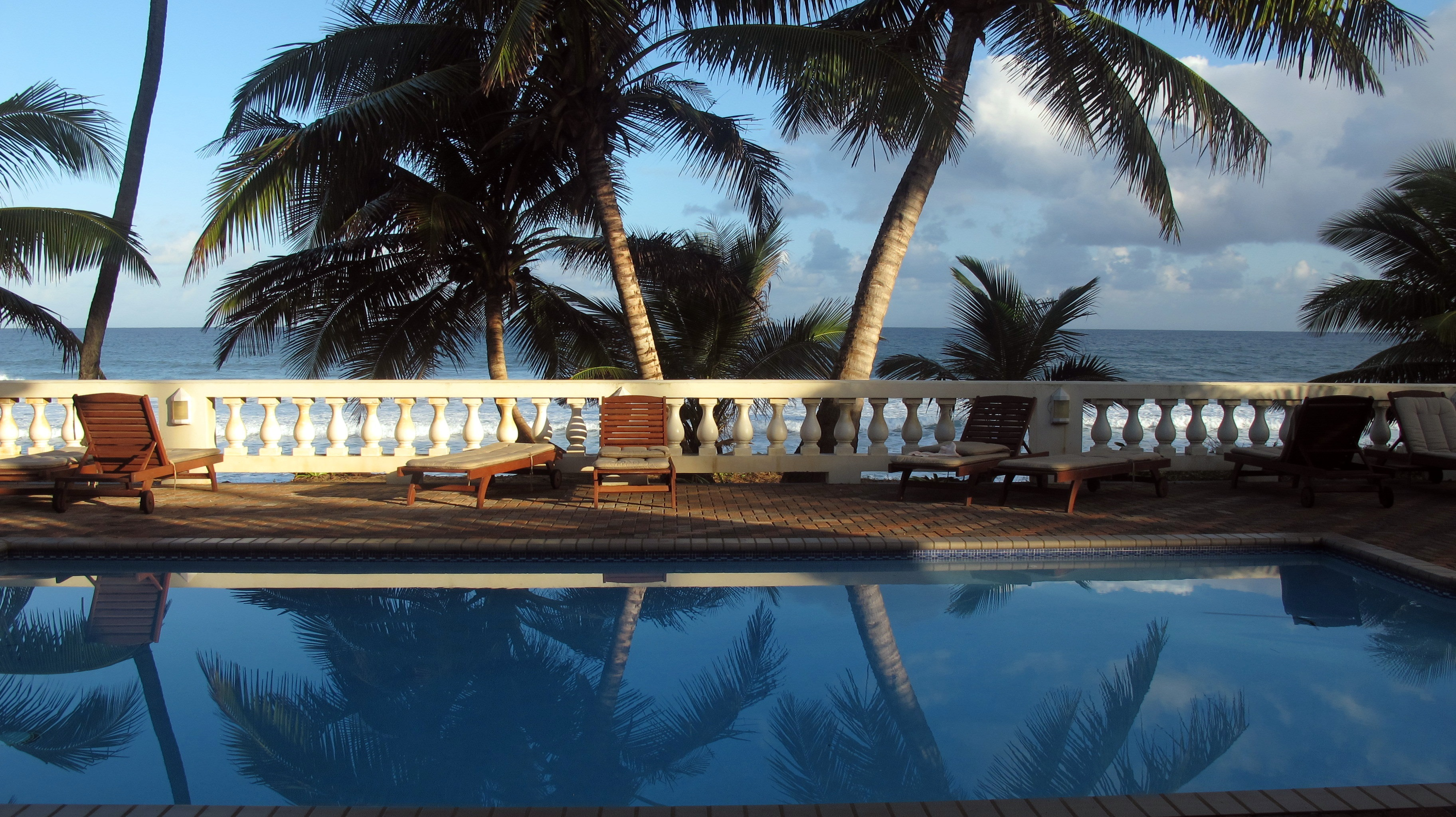
Casa Isleña Inn in Rincón

The major industry of Rincón is tourism.

The Boiling Nuclear Superheater (BONUS) Reactor Facility, also known to the locals as "the Domes", is a decommissioned nuclear plant. The construction of BONUS started in 1960, and the reactor had its first controlled nuclear chain reaction on April 13, 1964, achieving full power operation in September 1965. Operation of the BONUS reactor was terminated in June 1968 because of technical difficulties and the ensuing need for high-cost modifications. General decontamination of the reactor was performed with the goal of meeting unrestricted use criteria in all accessible areas of the building. Residual radioactive materials remaining in the structure were isolated or shielded to protect site visitors and workers. During subsequent years, more radioactive contamination was identified in portions of the building, and additional clean-up and shielding activities were conducted in the 1990s and early 2000s. It was Puerto Rico's only nuclear reactor.

== Demographics ==
Rincón reported the smallest decline in population of any Puerto Rican municipality between the 2010 and 2020 censuses (no municipality recorded an increase). The population fell by only 13, less than 0.1% of the overall population.

As of 2020, 5.1% of the population is of non-Hispanic origin, making Rincón the least Hispanic municipality on the Puerto Rican mainland. This represents an increase from 2010, when only 3.6% of the population was non-Hispanic.

Historical population
Census	Pop.	Note	%±
1900	6,641		—
1910	7,275		9.5%
1920	8,476		16.5%
1930	8,178		−3.5%
1940	9,256		13.2%
1950	9,888		6.8%
1960	8,706		−12.0%
1970	9,094		4.5%
1980	11,788		29.6%
1990	12,213		3.6%
2000	14,767		20.9%
2010	15,200		2.9%
2020	15,187		−0.1%
2025 (est.)	15,582	▲	2.6%
U.S. Decennial Census; 1899 (shown as 1900) 1910–1930; 1930–1950 1960–2000 2010 2020

== Tourism ==
"Art Walk", a community initiative to build the social fabric of Rincón, takes places every Thursday. Locals and tourists mingle in the main town square Plaza de recreo in downtown Rincón to enjoy food, drinks, music and local art.

=== Landmarks and places of interest ===
There are 53 beaches in Rincón. Main attractions of Rincón include:

- La Bandera (Pico Atalaya)
- Domes Beach
- Steps Beach
- Balneario de Rincón
- Punta Higuero Lighthouse
- Tres Palmas Marine Reserve

== Culture ==
=== Surfing ===
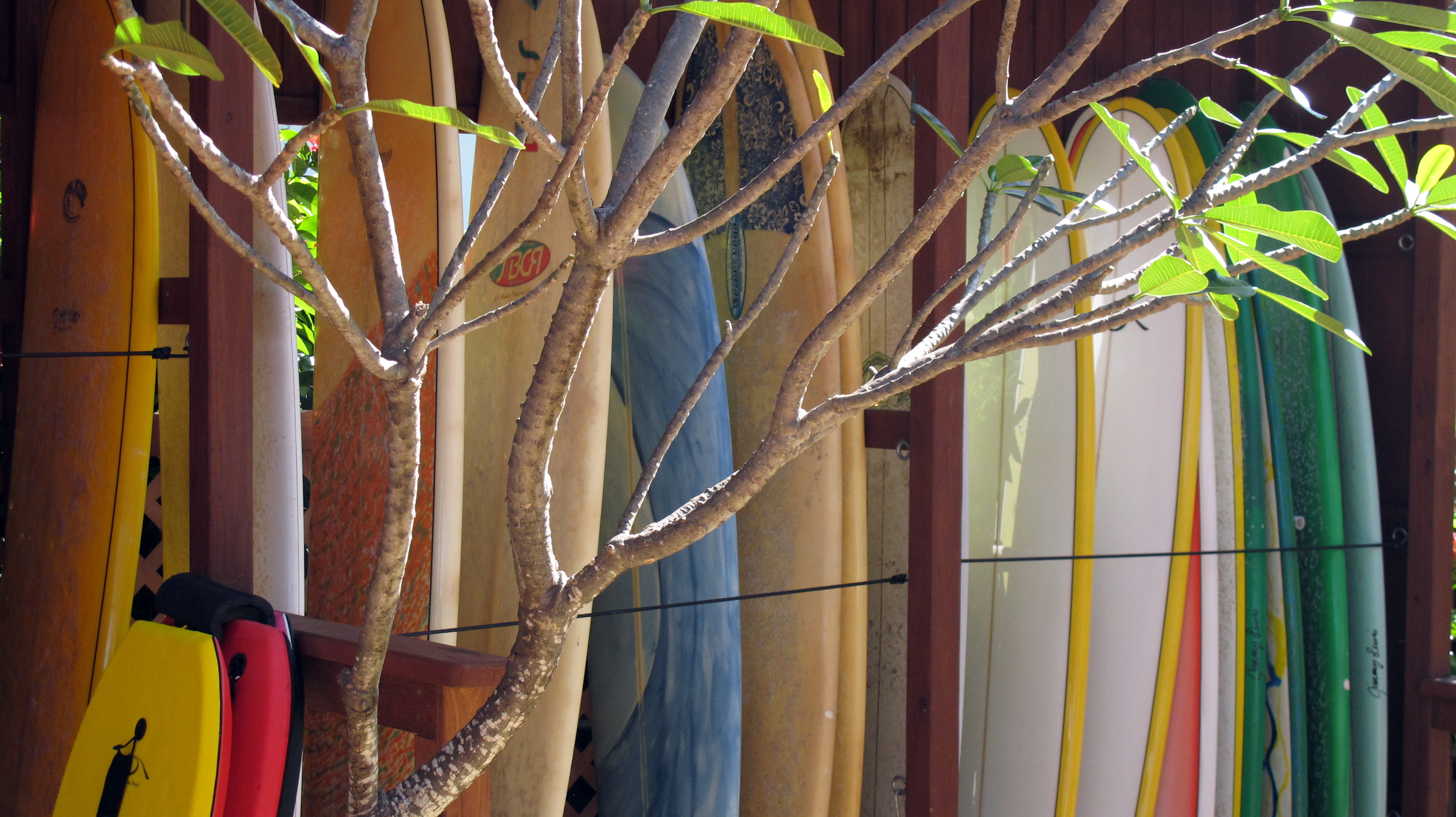
Mar Azul Surf Shop in Rincón

Rincón is well known as a surfing destination. Rincón rose to international recognition through the 1968 World Surfing Championship, which was held at Domes and Maria's Beaches. The winter surf along Rincón's coast is some of the best in the region. Generally regarded as one of the best surf spots across the globe, Rincón draws surfers from around the world and is the center of the island's surf scene. Dubbed the "Caribbean's Hawaii," winter waves here can approach 25–30 feet (6.7m) in height, sometimes equaling the force of the surf on Oahu's north shore. Famed surfing beaches in town include Little Malibu, Tres Palmas, Maria's, Indicators, Domes, Pools, Sandy Beach and Antonio's. The best time to surf is from November through March, but summer storms can also kick up the surf during the late summer.

=== Festivals and events ===
Rincón celebrates its patron saint festival in September. The Fiestas Patronales de Santa Rosa de Lima is a religious and cultural celebration that generally features parades, games, artisans, amusement rides, regional food, and live entertainment.

Other festivals and events celebrated in Rincón include:

- Whale watching – January and February
- Humpback whale Festival – March
- Surfing season – all year long
- Ultimate Dirt Challenge – March
- Rincón International Film Festival – April
- Coconut Festival – May
- Rincon Triathlon – June

== Government ==
Like all municipalities in Puerto Rico, Rincón is administered by a mayor. The current mayor is Carlos López Bonilla, from the Popular Democratic Party (PPD). López was first elected at the 2000 general election.

The city belongs to the Puerto Rico Senatorial district IV, which is represented by two Senators. In 2024, Jeison Rosa and Karen Michelle Román Rodríguez, both from the New Progressive Party (PNP), were elected as District Senators.

== Transportation ==
There are 8 bridges in Rincón.

== Symbols ==
The municipio has an official flag and coat of arms.

=== Flag ===
Created and designed by Evaristo Cardona Moreno and art performed by Jose Luis Cardona Martinez (his eldest son). The colors of the Rincón flag are red, orange, yellow, green and white. The triangle has a five-pointed white star representing the urban zone. There are white stars of equal size which represent the 9 barrios. The red and orange symbolize the vitality and vigor of its people. The yellow symbolizes Christianity, the green symbolizes vegetation and hope for progress and the white symbolizes the integrity between its barrios and urban zone.

=== Coat of arms ===
Created and designed by Angel L. Cardona Moreno, the shield consists of a green and orange Spanish blazon, with a yellow band inclined left to right. To the right and on a green background a cross, symbol of Christendom. To the left and on an orange background a Spanish ship, symbol of the discovery of Puerto Rico, in the coasts of Rincón (this is greatly disputed, as the towns of Aguada, Rincón, and Añasco all claim entry-point status).

== Notable people ==
- Kiara Ortega – Miss Universe Puerto Rico 2018

== Gallery ==
Some of the scenes in Rincón:

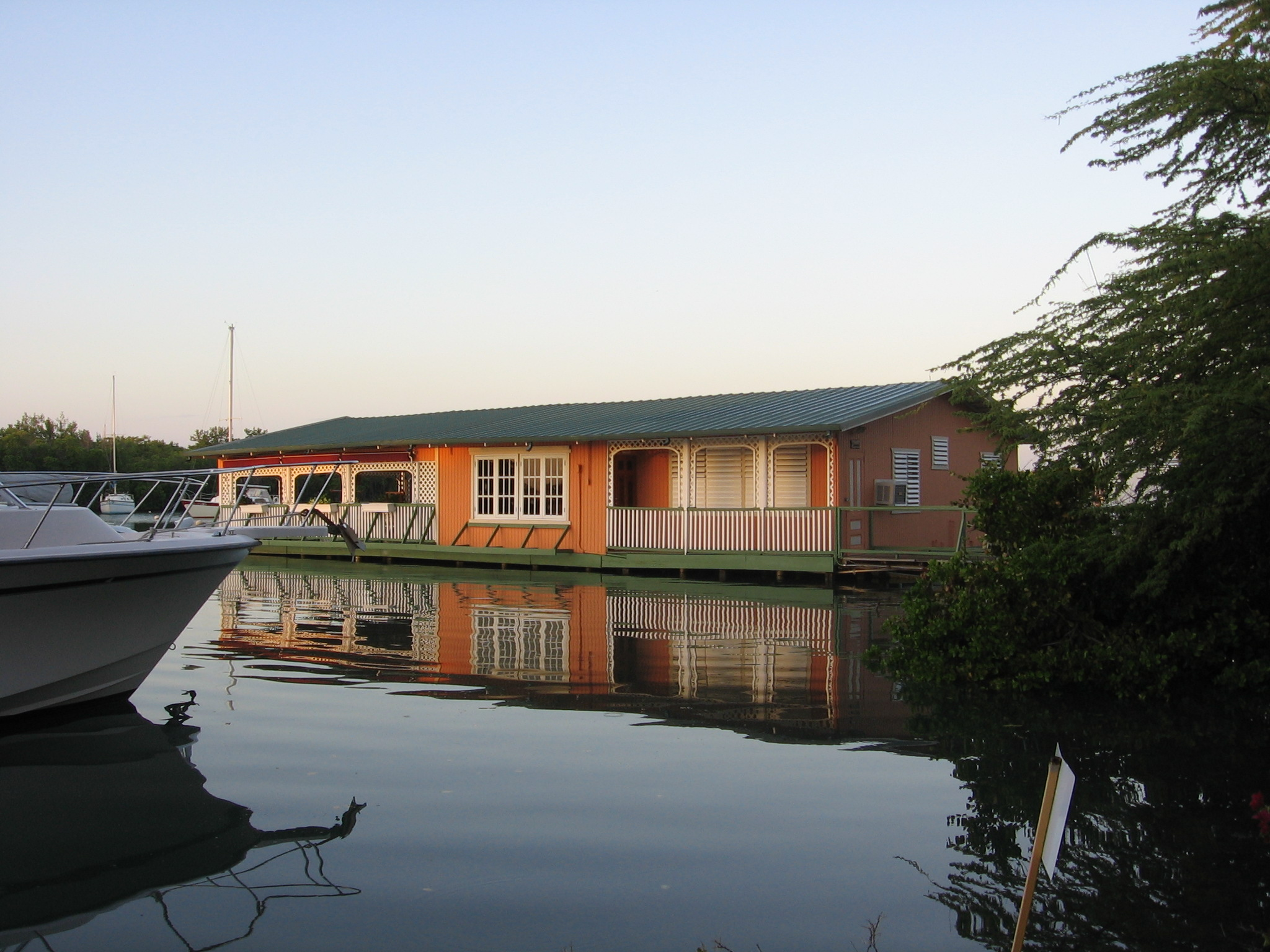
House on water

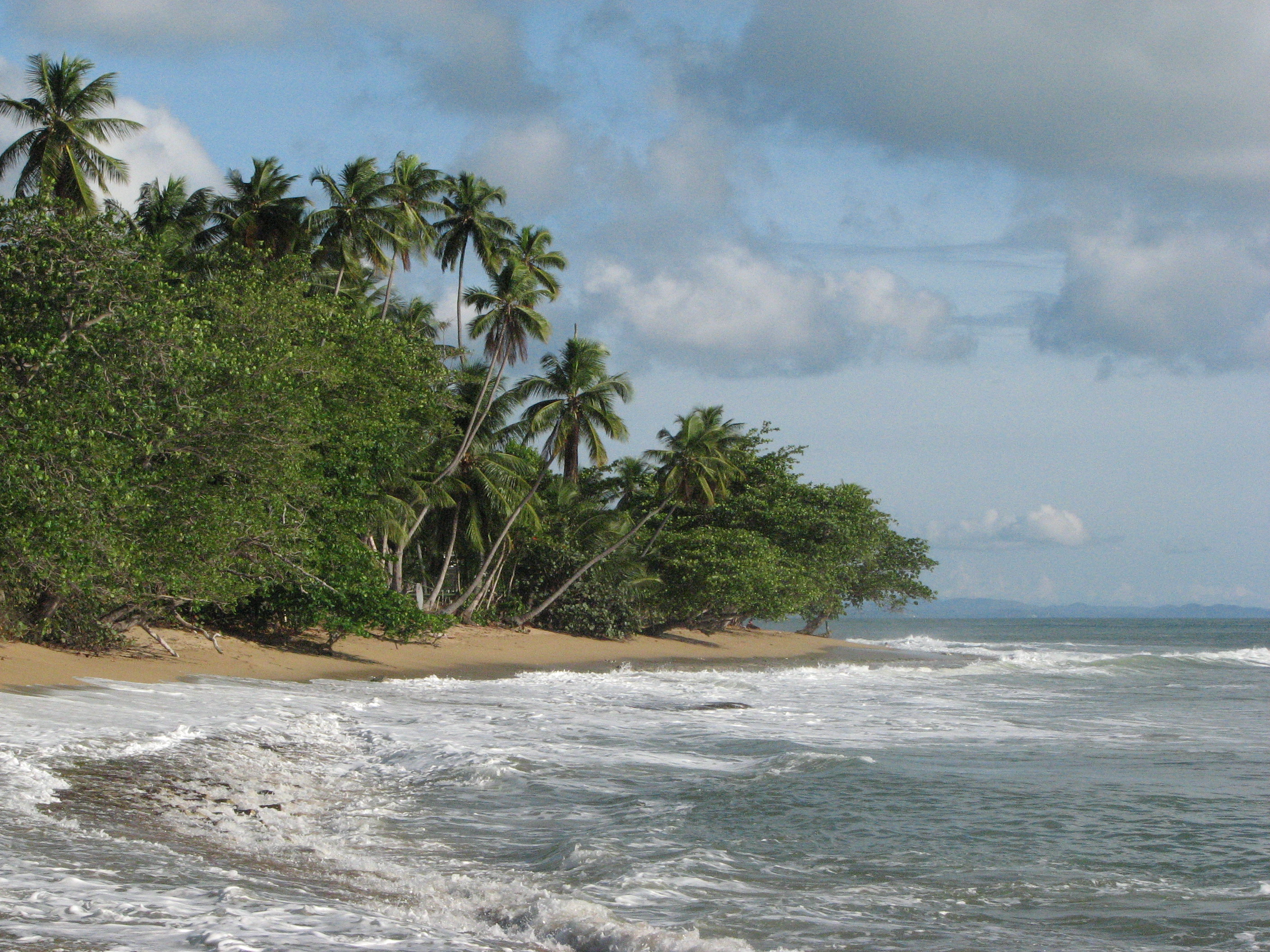
Steps Beach

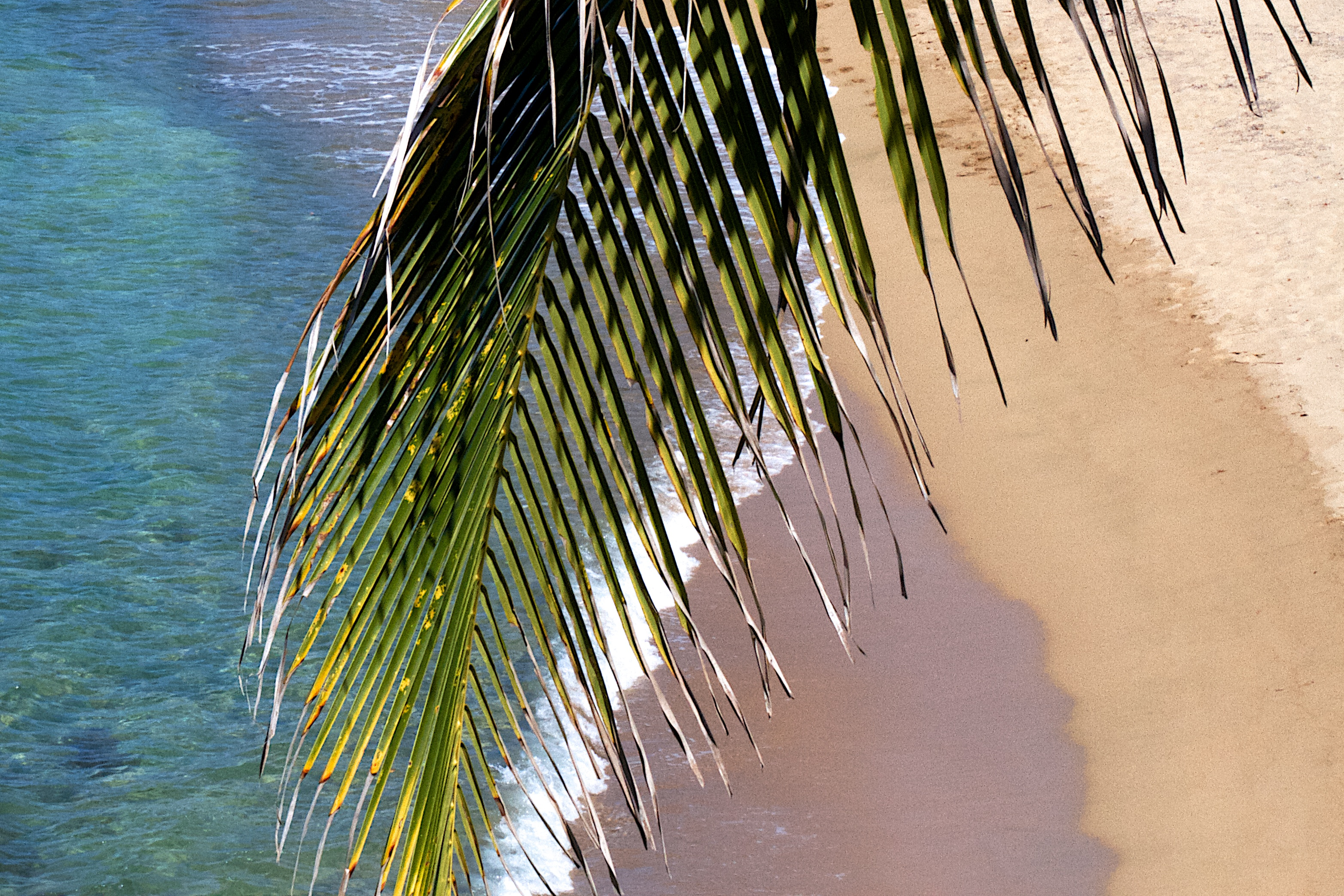
Domes Beach

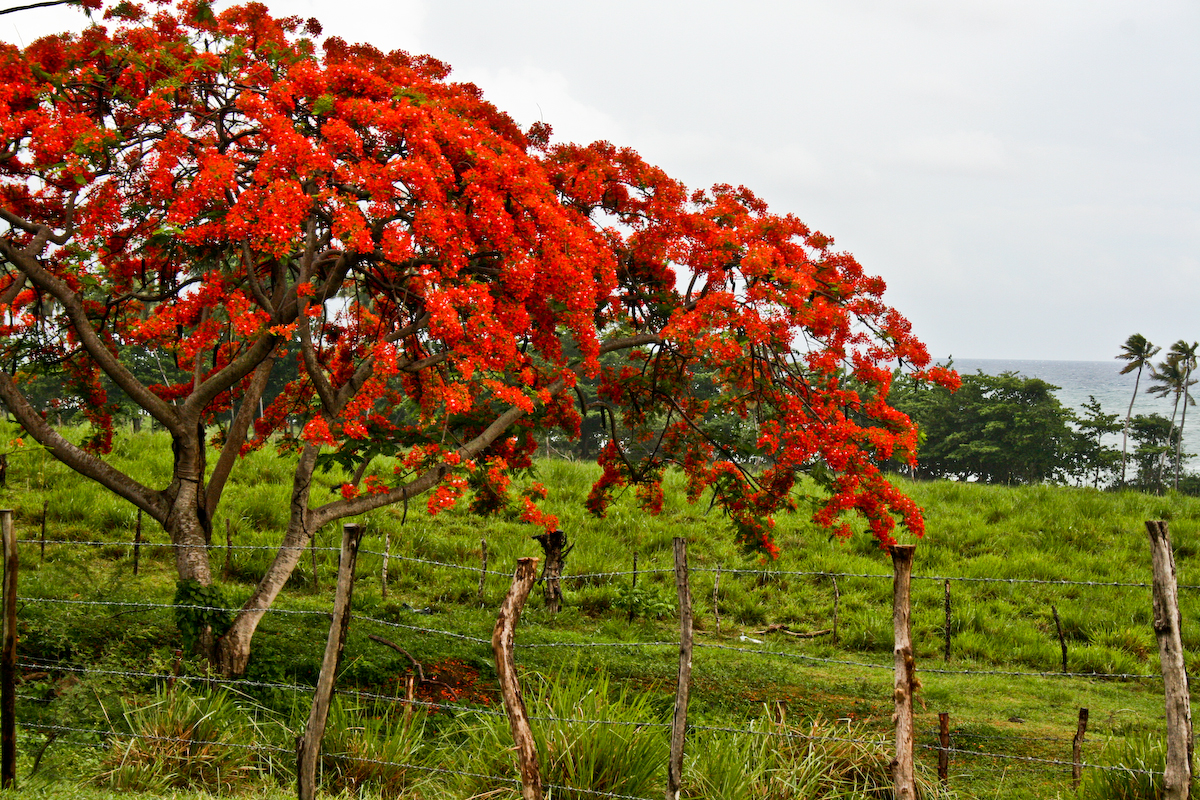
Flamboyan

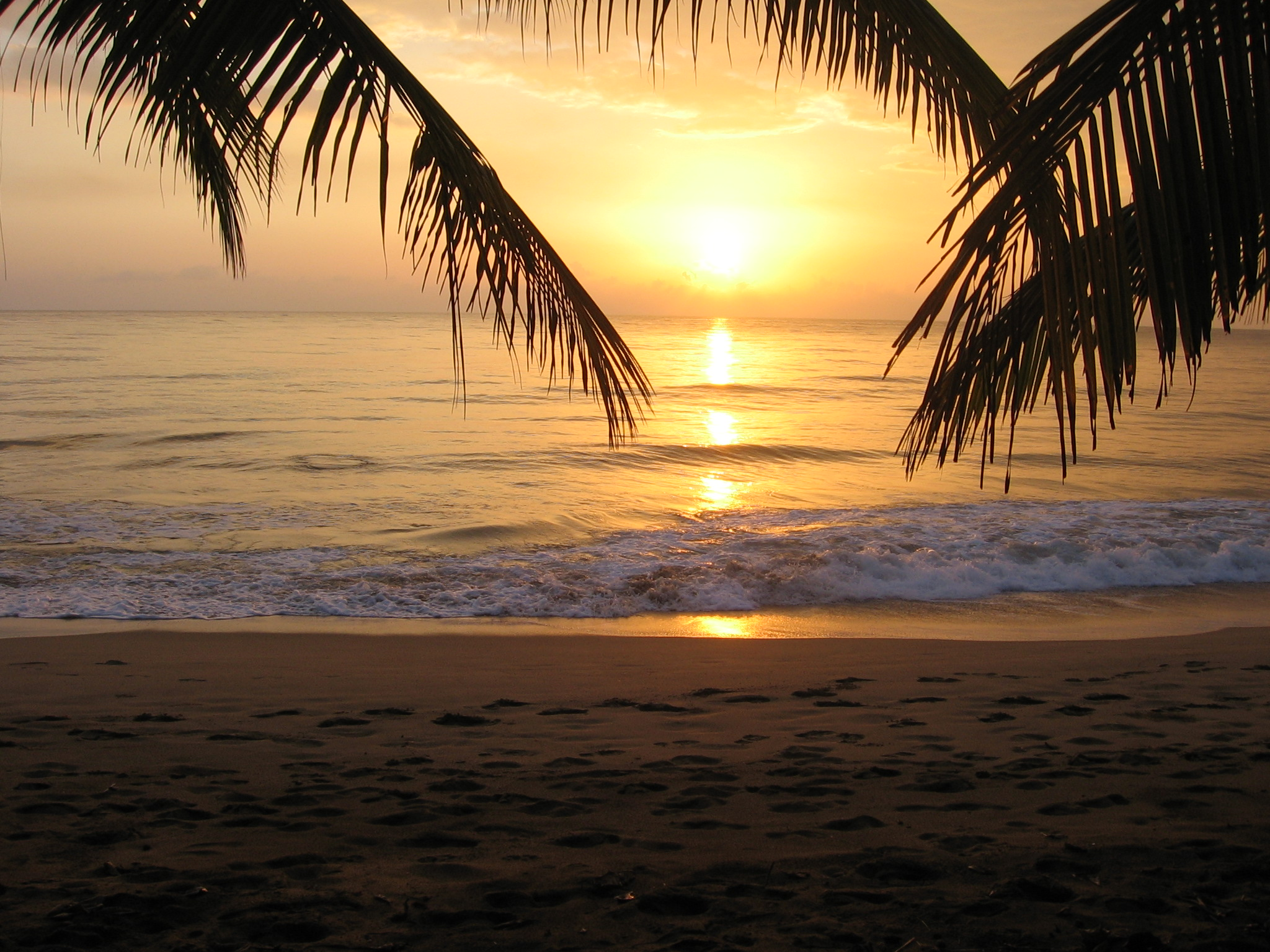
Sunset

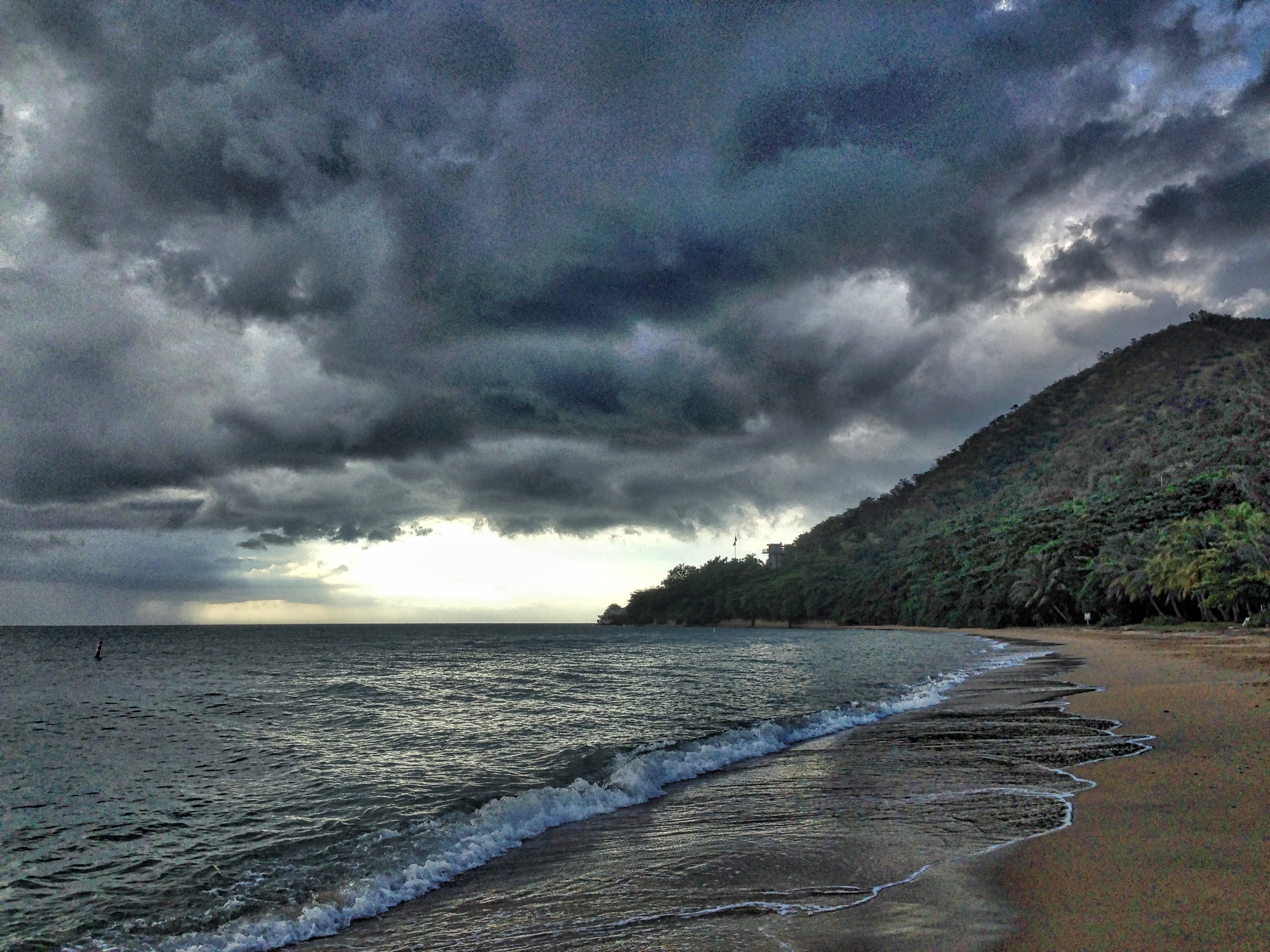
South of Rincón

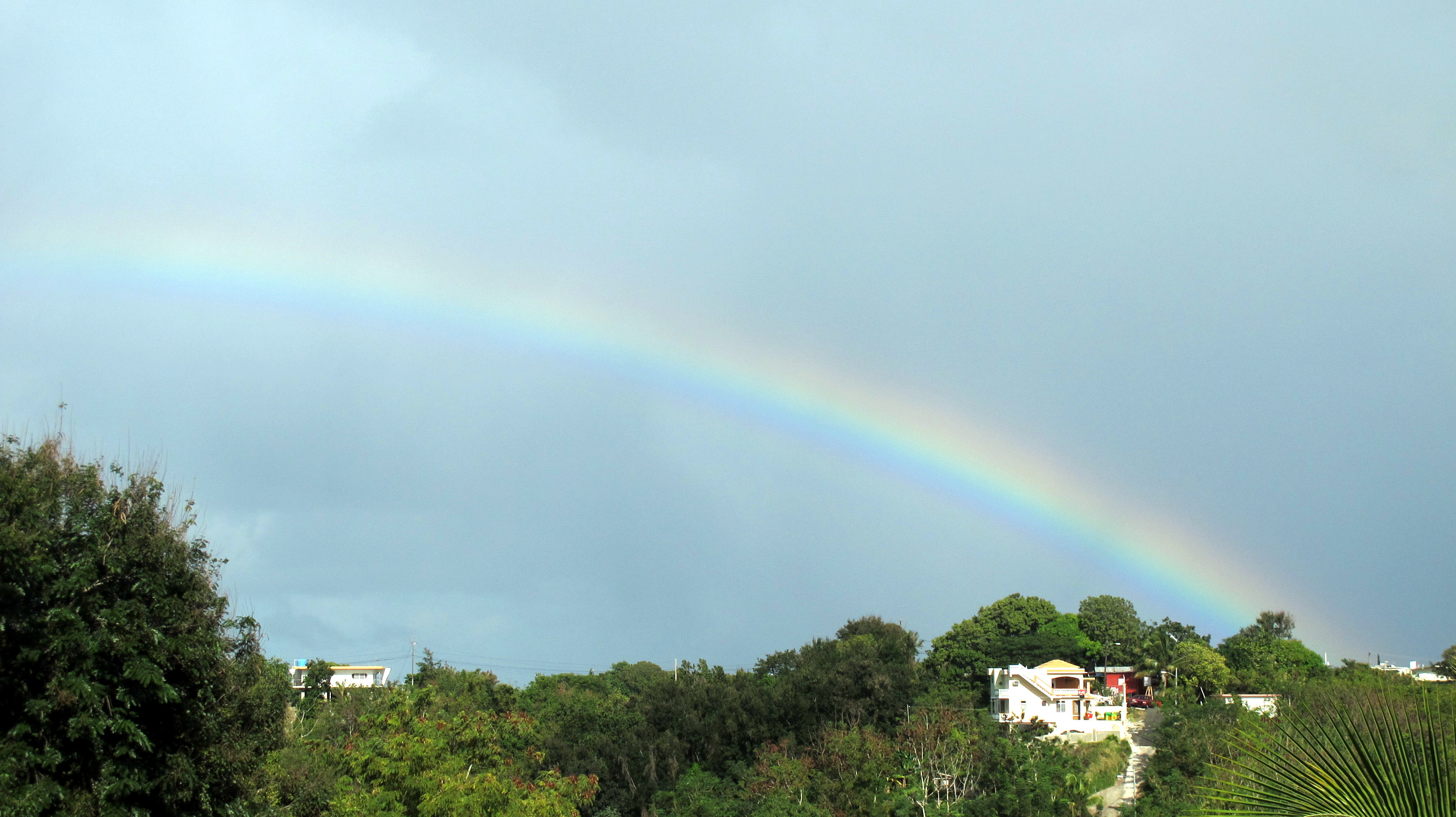
Rainbow over hills

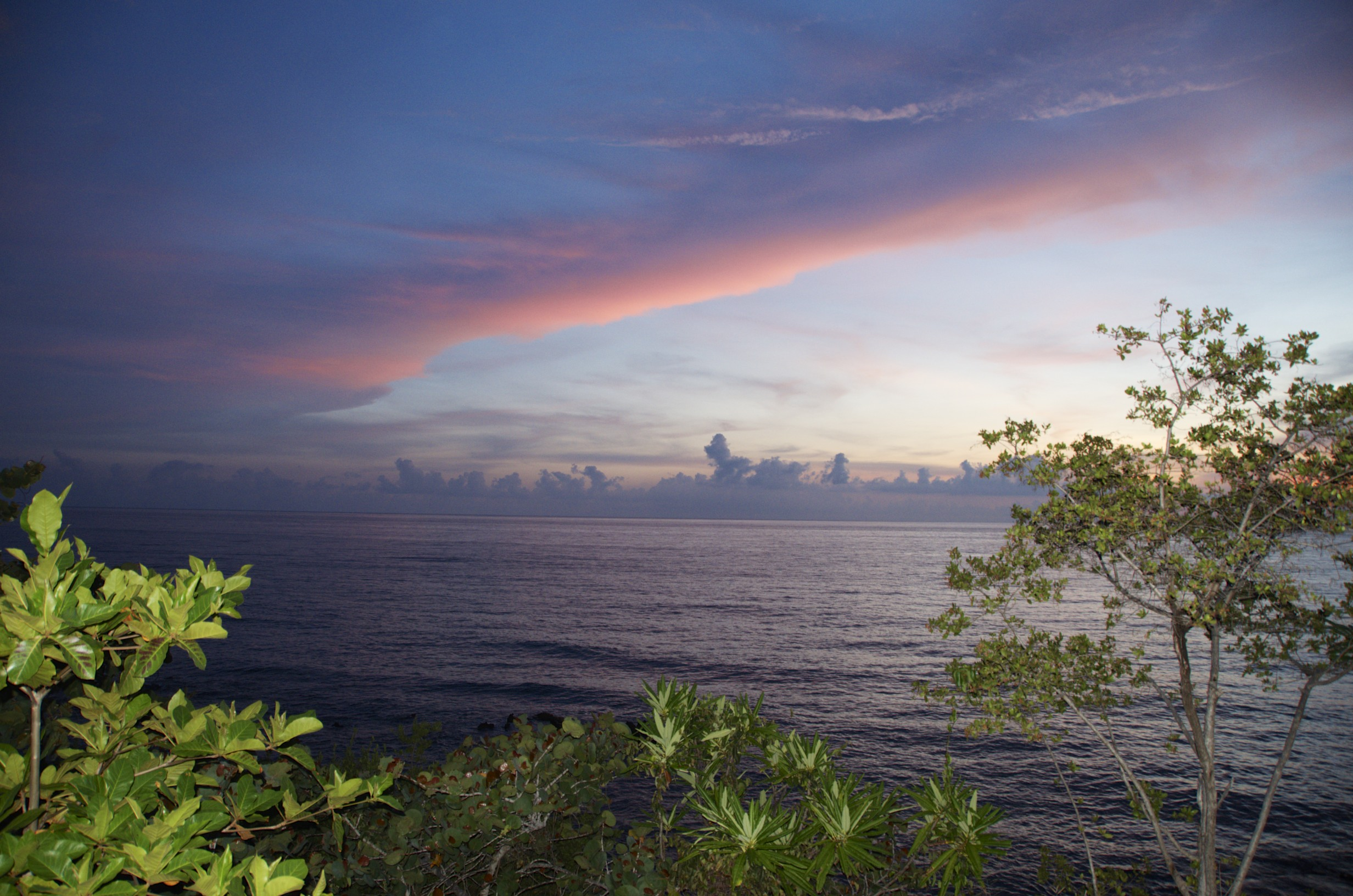
Sunset

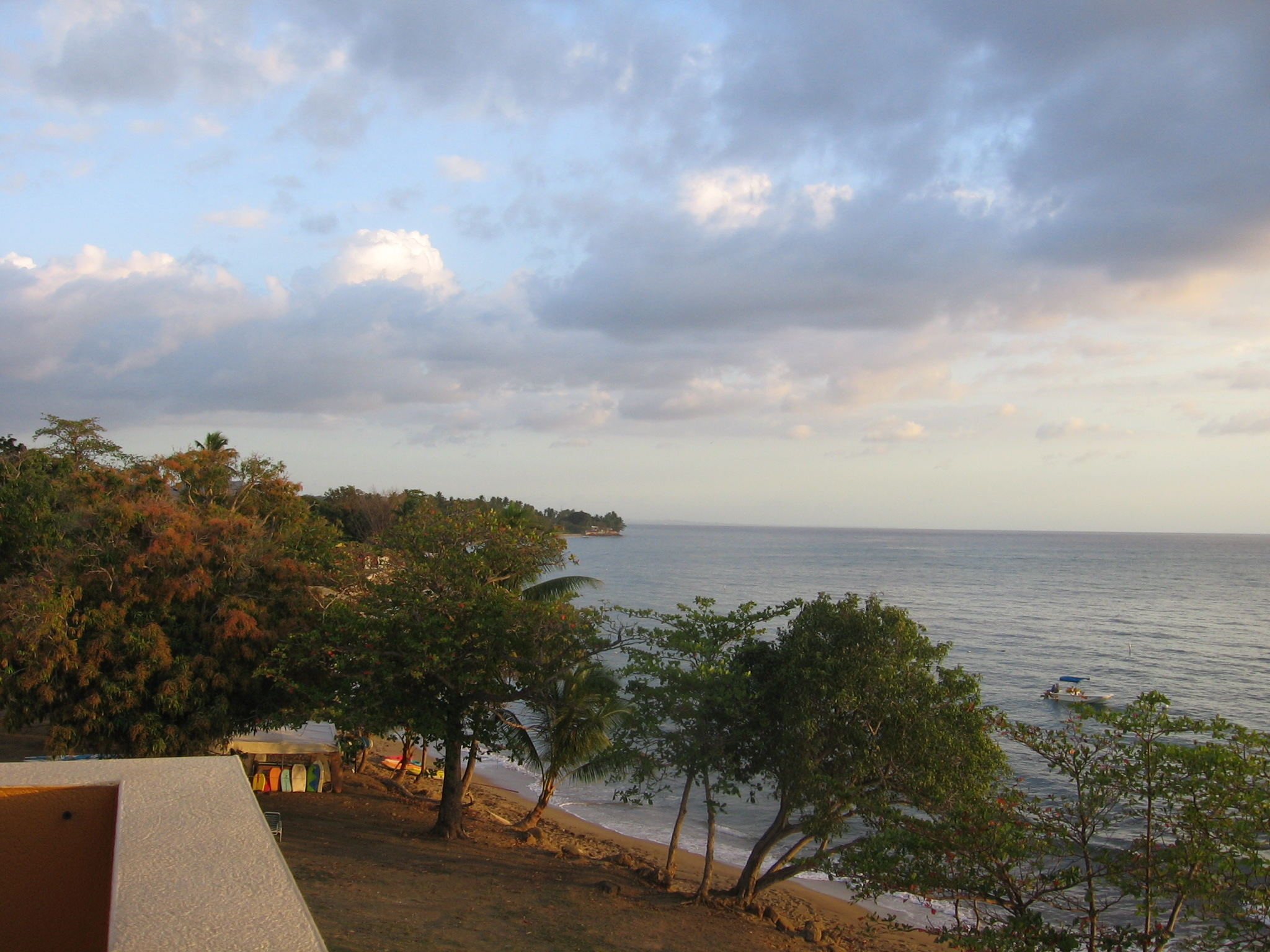
Beach

== See also ==
- List of Puerto Ricans
- History of Puerto Rico
- National Register of Historic Places listings in Rincón, Puerto Rico
- Did you know-Puerto Rico?
