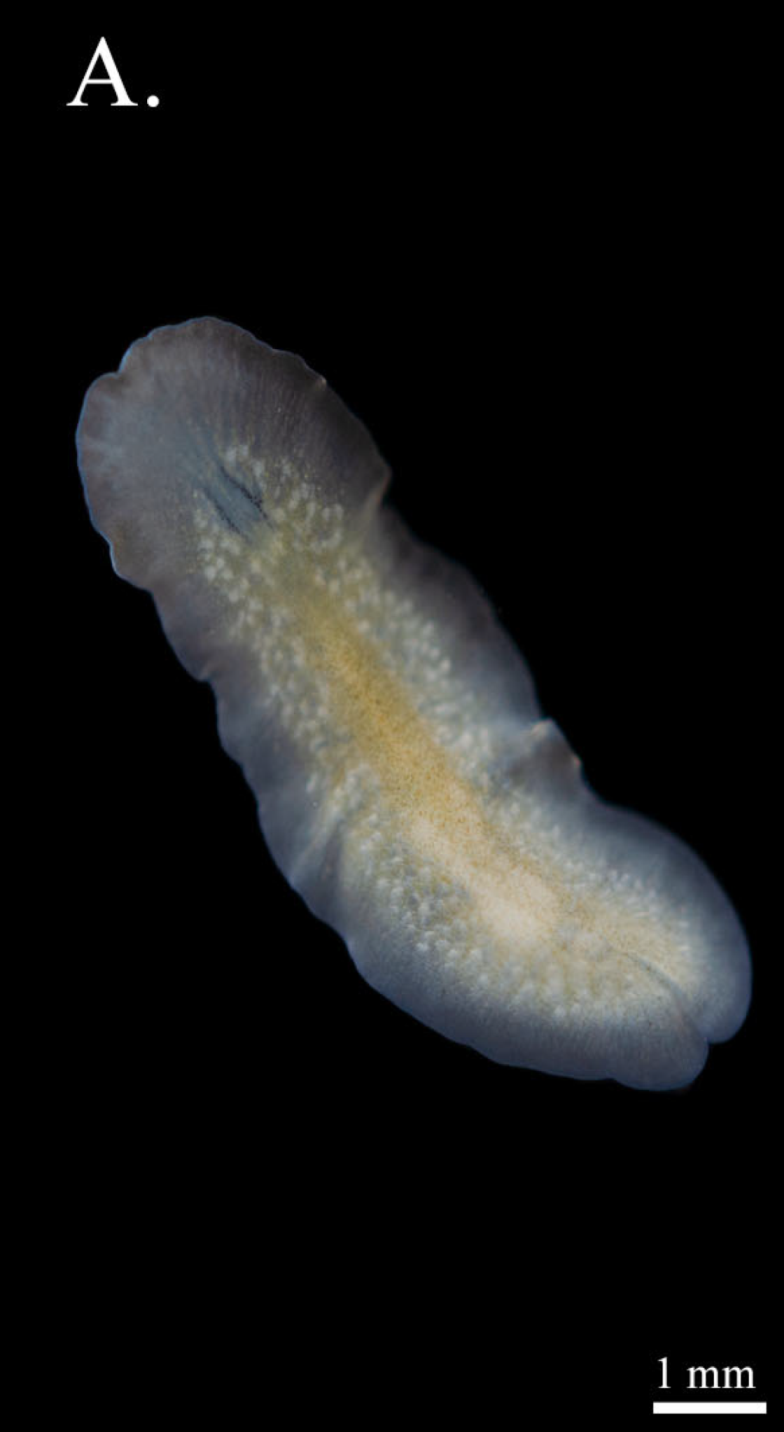
- Ilyella yrsa, an example of an Ilyplanidae flatworm

Scientific classification
- Kingdom: Animalia
- Phylum: Platyhelminthes
- Order: Polycladida
- Suborder: Acotylea
- Family: Ilyplanidae; Faubel, 1983

= Ilyplanidae =

Family of flatworms

Ilyplanidae is a family of flatworms belonging to the order Polycladida.

== Genera ==
The following genera are recognised in the family Ilyplanidae:

- Anandroplana Hyman, 1955
- Crassandros Hyman, 1955
- Enterogonia Haswell, 1907
- Euilyoida Faubel, 1983
- Ilyella Faubel, 1983
- Ilyplana Bock, 1925
- Postenterogonia Faubel, 1983
- Pulchriplana Palombi, 1938
- Tripylocelis Haswell, 1907
- Zygantrella Beveridge, 2018
- Zygantroides Faubel, 1983
- Zygantroplana Laidlaw, 1906
- Zygantrum Faubel, 1983
