= Autonomous University of Central America =

Private university in Curridabat, Costa Rica

- Universidad Autónoma de Centro América
- Latin: Universitas Autonoma Americae Centralis
- Motto: Ad sapientiam et honorem (Latin)
- Motto in English: "For wisdom and honor"
- Type: Private university
- Established: 7 January 1976; 50 years ago
- Rector: Guillermo Malavassi Vargas
- Location: Granadilla, Curridabat, Costa Rica; 9.919181989605022°N 84.02457599447743°W
- Other campuses: Caribe; Occidente; Pacífico Norte; Pacífico Sur
- Colours: Blue and yellow
- Website: uaca.ac.cr

The Autonomous University of Central America (Universidad Autónoma de Centro América, UACA) is a private university in Curridabat, Costa Rica. Founded in 1976, it was the first private university in the country. It was formed by the UACA Foundation, and Guillermo Malavassi Vargas has served as its rector since its establishment.

The university is a private, non-profit entity of public benefit, as established by the 1973 Law on Foundations, under which it was created. As a legal entity of public benefit, it is subject to the financial oversight of the Office of the Comptroller General of the Republic.

The university's creation aimed to serve secondary school graduates who were unable to find places at the University of Costa Rica and the National University, which were overwhelmed by the number of young people seeking higher education. The university's stated mission is to "train professionals in a framework of respect and freedom, with a disciplined mind in logical and creative thinking, and a supportive and humanistic attitude."

As of 2026, UACA offers 22 undergraduate programs leading to bachelor's and licentiate degrees, along with an academic doctorate associated with each program. It also offers a specialization in Notarial and Registry Law and five professional master's degrees.

== History ==
The origins of UACA date to the creation of the University of Central America Foundation in 1975. On 27 June of that year, Minister of Education Fernando Volio Jiménez met with representatives of the foundation, Fabio Fournier Jiménez, Alberto Di Mare Fuscaldo, and Guillermo Malavassi Vargas, to discuss the proposed university, its organization, and the requirements for its operation.

The government subsequently authorized the establishment of the university through Executive Decree No. 5622-E of 23 December 1975, signed by President Daniel Oduber Quirós and Minister Volio Jiménez. The decree was published in La Gaceta on 7 January 1976. A subsequent executive decree, No. 6359-E, provided additional authorization.

UACA began teaching in August 1976. It was established as a non-profit institution and became Costa Rica's first private university. Its creation took place during a period of increasing demand for higher education, when the country's public universities had limited capacity to accommodate the growing number of secondary-school graduates seeking university places.

Under Article 3 of its Organic Statute, the university was situated within the Western cultural tradition and identified its institutional principles as ideological pluralism, individual initiative, freedom of thought, solidarity among social groups, equality of opportunity, fraternity and mutual assistance, and respect for the law.

== Organization and administration ==
From its establishment, UACA adopted a decentralized organizational structure based on a system of affiliated university colleges. The model was influenced by the collegiate system associated with the University of Cambridge. Under this system, the affiliated colleges functioned as relatively autonomous academic units within the university, with a maximum of 100 students each at a given time. The model was meant to emphasize direct interaction between students and professors and decentralize academic administration.

Four colleges initially began operating in 1976: Collegium Stvdivm Generale, Collegium Académico, Collegium Monterrey, and Collegium Véritas. The number of affiliated colleges subsequently increased, reaching 16 at its peak. As some of the affiliated colleges subsequently became independent of UACA in 1988, the university consolidated its operations at a central campus in the Granadilla district of Curridabat. The campus was later named after Guillermo Malavassi Vargas, the university's founder and first rector.

The University Council is the highest academic and administrative body of the university. It is composed of the rector, the Minister of Public Education or a representative, the secretary general, the academic director, three directors of the programs with the highest enrollment, and a student representative. Its responsibilities include representing the university; establishing, eliminating, or merging faculties, schools, institutes, university academies, regional campuses, and decentralized classrooms; appointing the rector and academic councils; approving the appointments of the secretary general and academic director; and approving and overseeing the university's budget, subject to the approval of the Administrative Board of the UACA Foundation.

Teaching is organized through a hierarchical academic rank system that includes Cathedraticum, various forms of Licentia Docendi, and Venia Legendi, as well as guest professors and teaching assistants. Formal teaching appointments require authorization by the rector, with qualifications varying according to the level and type of appointment; higher academic ranks generally require doctoral-level education, teaching experience, and research activity. The university's regulations also provide for a probationary period to evaluate teaching performance before an appointment is confirmed. UACA publishes the academic journal Acta Académica, which is issued twice a year, in May and November. Its first issue was published in February 1987.
