= 2020 Costa Rican municipal elections =

- 2 February 2020

82 mayors, 505 aldermen, 480 syndics, 1888 district councillors, 8 intendants, 32 municipal district councillors and their alternates
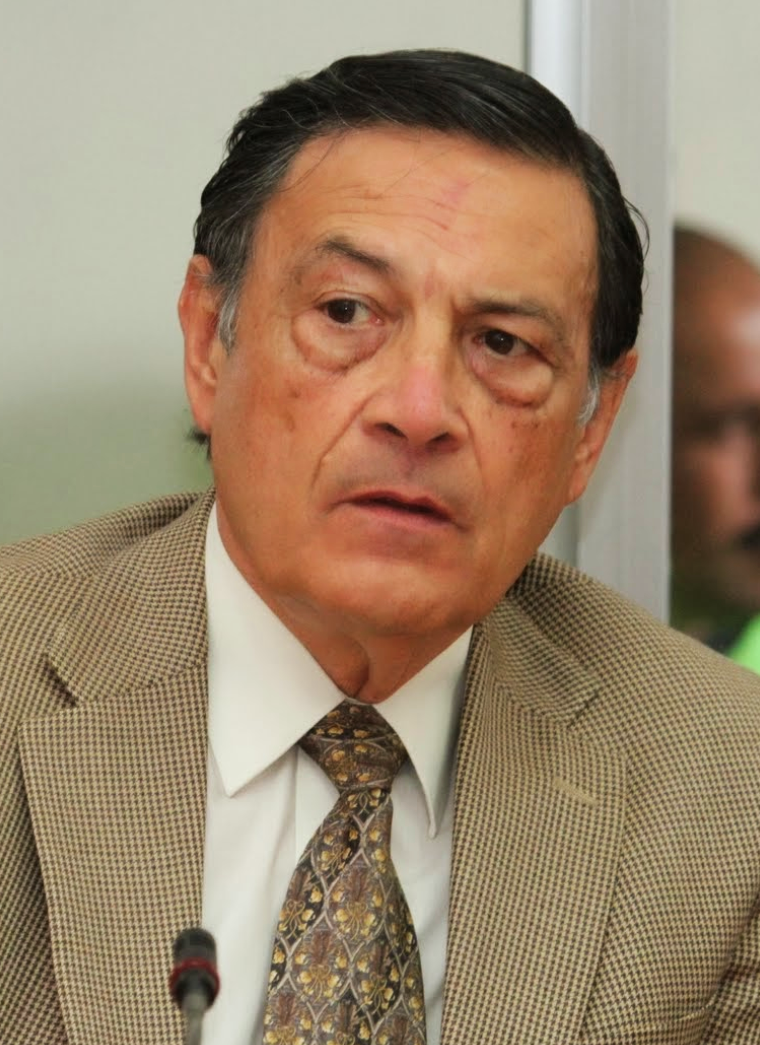

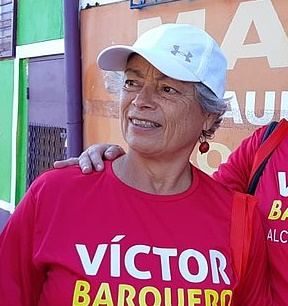

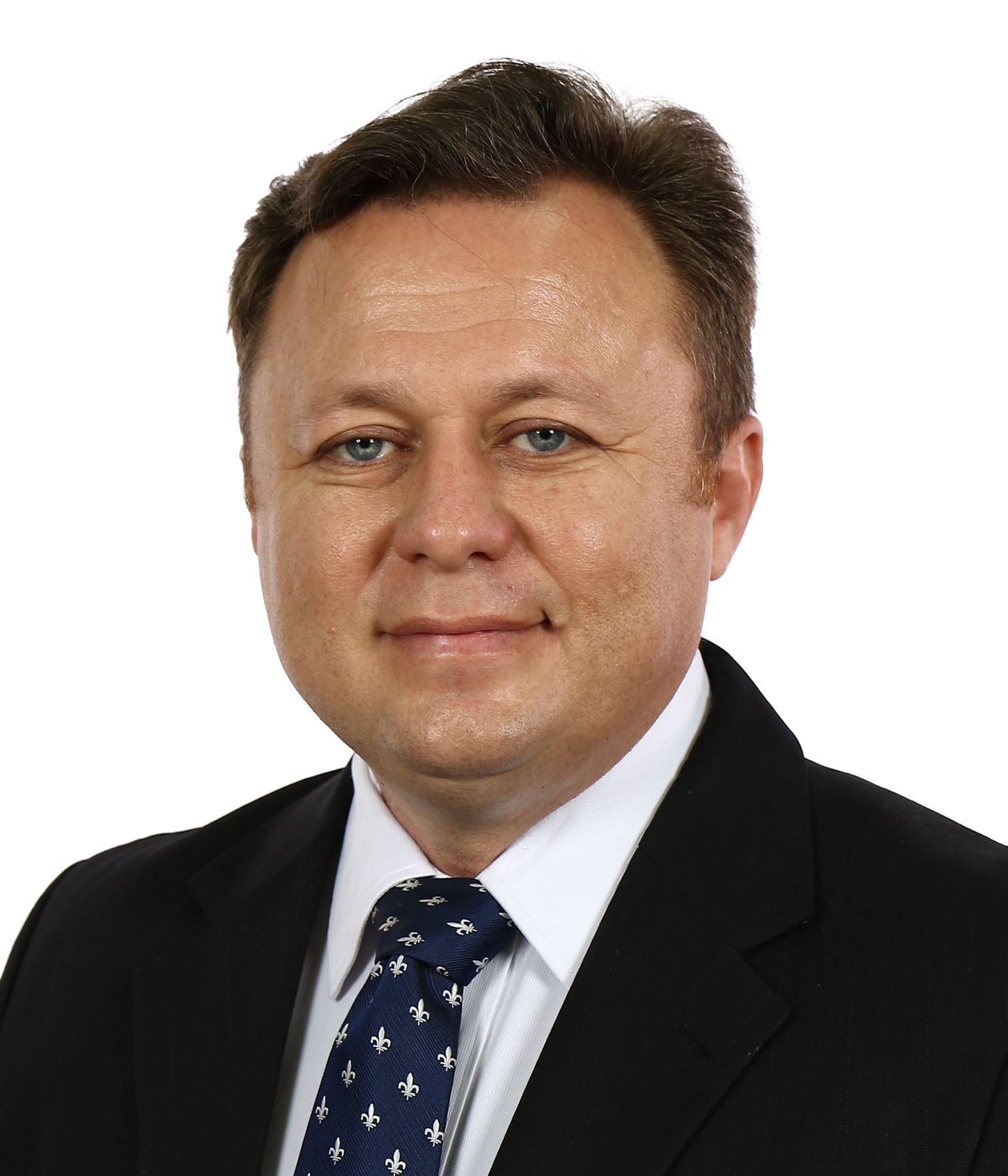

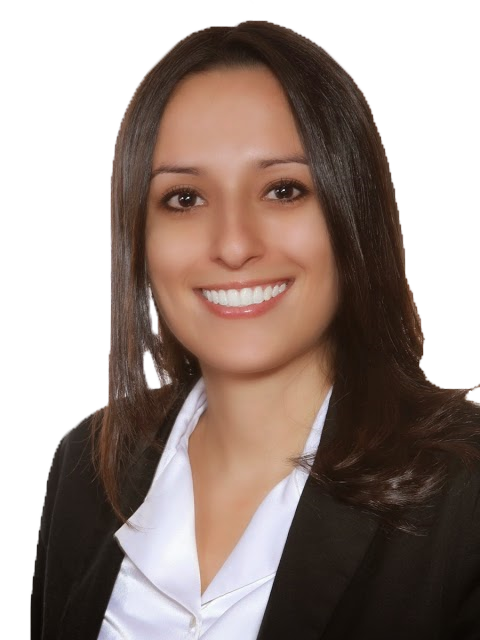

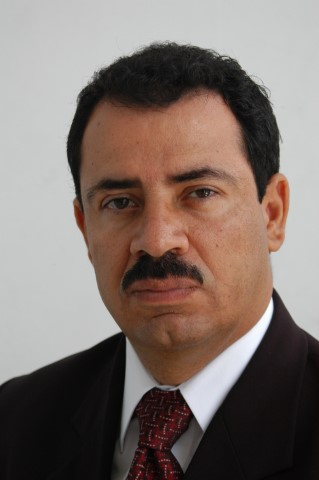
	First party	Second party	Third party
Leader	Guillermo Constenla Umaña	Randall Alberto Quirós Bustamante	Marta Eugenia Solano Arias
Party	PLN	PUSC	PAC
Mayors	42	16	5
Mayors +/–	▼8	▲2	▼2
Aldermen	175	95	33
Aldermen +/–	▼11	▼9	▼29
	Fourth party	Fifth party	Sixth party
Leader	Sergio Mena Díaz	Dragos Dolanescu Valenciano	Natalia Díaz Quintana
Party	PNG	PRSC	UP
Mayors	4	2	1
Mayors +/–	▲1	▲2	New
Aldermen	23	24	10
Aldermen +/–	▲9	▼4	New
	Seventh party
Leader	Mario Redondo Poveda
Party	ADC
Mayors	1
Mayors +/–	▲1
Aldermen	9
Aldermen +/–	▲5

Municipal elections were held in Costa Rica on Sunday, February 2, 2020, to elect all municipal offices in the country: mayors, aldermen, syndics (district council presidents), district councilors and the intendants of eight special autonomous districts, together with their respective alternates in all cases (see local government in Costa Rica). These were the fifth direct municipal elections since the amendment to the 1998 Municipal Code and the second to be held mid-term since the 2009 reform.

In the newly founded canton of Río Cuarto, the election of mayor and members of the City Council was held for the first time.

As in previous elections the three main parties in number of mayors were the National Liberation Party (PLN) with 42 (losing 8 mayors including the provincial capitals of Cartago and Liberia from the previous elections in 2016), Social Christian Unity (PUSC) with 15, winning one extra mayor, and the Citizens' Action Party (PAC) with 4 (five if Montes de Oca's PAC-lead ruling coalition is counted), losing 2 from the prior reelection. The New Generation Party won one more mayor making a total of 4, despite not having parliamentary representation, and Social Christian Republican Party (a splinter from PUSC) won one extra mayor making a total of 2. The newly founded liberal party United We Can founded by former Libertarian deputy Natalia Diaz won the mayoralty of Oreamuno and had important support in several cantons, whilst Cartago was won by former deputy and presidential nominee Mario Redondo Poveda from Christian Democratic Alliance. The left-wing Broad Front lost its only mayor in Barva canton against the aforementioned PRSC.

This election also saw an increase in support of local parties. We Are Moravia won in Moravia, United Communal in Turrubares, Palmares First in Palmares, Sarchí Alliance in Sarchí, Santo Domingo Advance Movement in Santo Domingo, The Great Nicoya in Nicoya, Authentic Santacrucian in Santa Cruz, Nandayure Progresses in Nandayure, Authenthic Limonense in Limón and Recovering Values in Pococí won the mayoralties of their cantons, and the already locally dominant 21st Century Curridabat was re-elected in Curridabat. Nine cantonal parties and one provincial party reached mayoralties for the first time.

The two main evangelical parties, National Restoration and the New Republic Party, didn't win any mayors, which was noticed by the media and described as a political failure due to their larger totals in the previous general election. Led by Fabricio Alvarado under the National Restoration banner, for the first time an Evangelical Christian party was one of the main voted ones in Costa Rica and went into the run-off against ruling PAC, reaching up to 800.000 votes despite losing the election. Alvarado quit National Restoration and founded New Republic party soon after but its results in the election were testimonial.

== History ==
66 incumbent mayors tried to get reelected, of which 24 are National Liberation Party members, among them the current mayor of San José since 1998 and former presidential candidate Johnny Araya Monge. The PLN made no official coalitions but made an alliance (unofficial mutual support) with the National Restoration Party in San Carlos Canton. The PLN presented nominees in all 82 cantons being the party with the most nominees followed by Social Christian Unity Party and National Restoration Party.

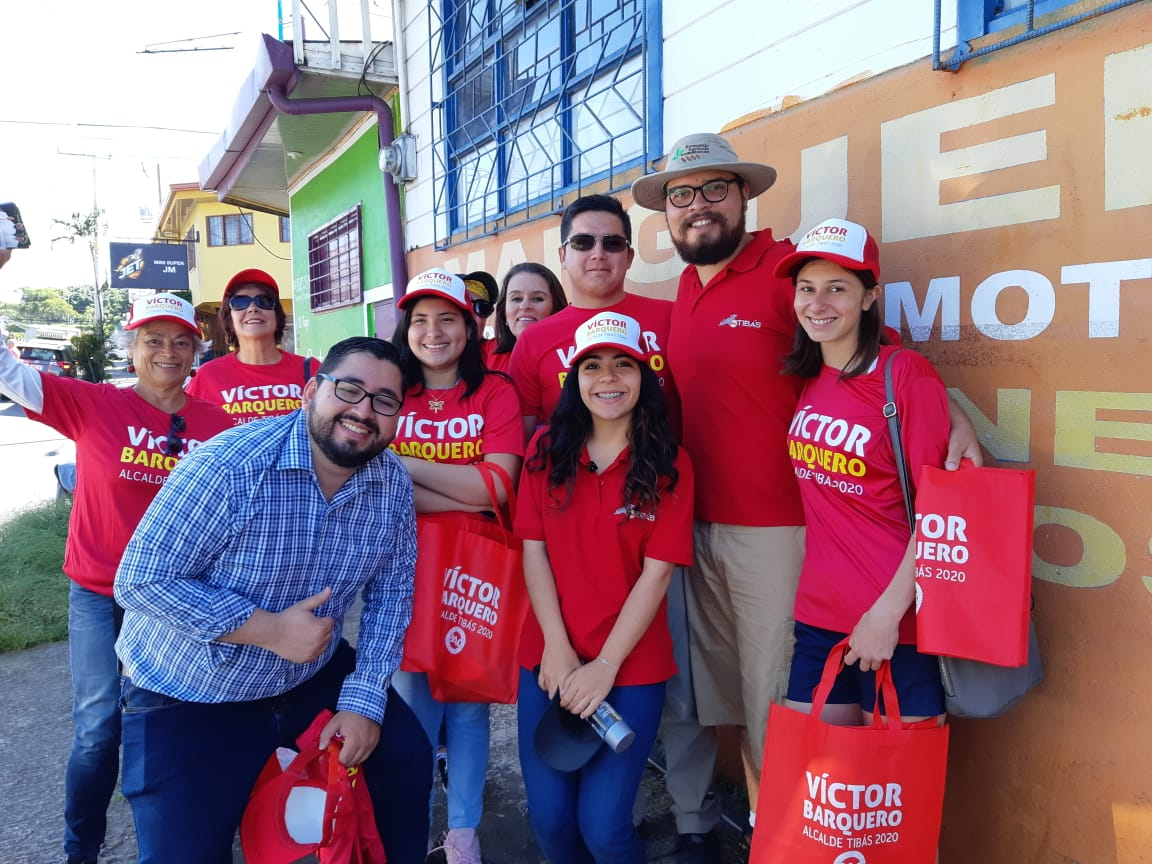
PAC sympathizers alongside the Party's president and mayor nominee in Tibás Canton.

Escazu's Arnoldo Barahona who was elected by the local Escazu's Progressive Yoke party ran his re-election through the New Generation Party.

The ruling Citizens' Action Party presented 55 candidates and formed three coalitions; in Aserrí together with the Social Christian Unity Party in the Aserrí of Everybody coalition supporting the Social Christian candidate; in Montes de Oca where it currently have the mayor's office the Montes de Oca People coalition was kept alongside the local Gente party, the Humanist Party and VAMOS; and Alliance for Nicoya in Nicoya where the local Nicoya Party would also participate. Originally in the canton of San José a coalition was planned under the Chepe Coalition banner alongside the provincial VAMOS party endorsing the candidacy of the independent Fernando Cartín and nominating the two vice mayor's offices, however the Electoral Court dissolved the coalition alleging that the VAMOS party did not nominated any candidate thus Cartín still ran but as an official PAC candidate (with VAMOS still as external supporter).

The Social Christian Unity Party took part in two coalitions; the above-mentioned with the PAC in Aserrí, and one with the local All For Flores party in the canton of Flores named Unity for Flores. Although there were negotiations for coalitions between the PAC and the Social Christian Republican Party (PRSC) in Belén, PRSC and Unidos Podemos in Heredia and with PAC in Cartago, these finally did not materialize.

The Broad Front made a coalition with the local party SJO Alternative named Juntos to participate in San José and with the Independent Belemite Party in the Belén Canton named Belemite Union.

New Republic, party of former candidate for National Restoration Party and second place in the 2018 presidential elections, Fabricio Alvarado, announced that it will not carry out coalitions with any other party, while the Libertarian Movement, once one of the largest parties in the country but now suffering a crisis, announced that it will not participate in the local elections.

== Results ==
=== Overall ===
==== Mayor ====
Cantons	Population	Incumbent mayor	Party	Elected mayor	Party
San José	288,054	Johnny Araya	PASJ	Johnny Araya	PLN
Escazú	56,509	Arnoldo Valentín Barahona	YPE	Arnoldo Valentín Barahona	PNG
Desamparados	206,708	Gilbert Jiménez	PLN	Gilbert Jiménez	PLN
Puriscal	31,202	Luis Madrigal	PUSC	Iris Arroyo Herrera	PLN
Tarrazú	17,233	Ana Lorena Rovira	PUSC	Ana Lorena Rovira	PUSC
Aserrí	52,808	José Oldemar García	PLN	José Oldemar García	PLN
Mora	23,004	Gilberto Monge	PNG	Rodrigo Jiménez Cascante	PNG
Goicoechea	124,704	Ana Lucía Madrigal	PLN	Rafael Vargas Brenes	PLN
Santa Ana	48,879	Gerardo Oviedo	PLN	Gerardo Oviedo	PLN
Alajuelita	75,418	Modesto Alpízar	PNG	Modesto Alpízar	PNG
Vázquez de Coronado	59,113	Rolando Méndez	PRSC	Rolando Méndez	PRSC
Acosta	19,342	Norman Eduardo Hidalgo	PAC	Norman Eduardo Hidalgo	PAC
Tibás	76,815	Carlos Luis Cascante	PLN	Carlos Luis Cascante	PLN
Moravia	56,919	Roberto Zoch	PAC	Roberto Zoch	PSM
Montes de Oca	54,288	Marcel Soler	CGMO	Marcel Soler	CGMO
Turrubares	5,175	Giovanni Madrigal	PLN	Giovanni Madrigal	PCU
Dota	6,940	Leonardo Chacón	PLN	Leonardo Chacón	PLN
Curridabat	72,564	Alicia Borja	CSXXI	Jimmy Cruz Jiménez	CSXXI
Pérez Zeledón	134,534	Jeffry Montoya	PUSC	Jeffry Montoya	PUSC
León Cortés	13,356	Jorge Denis Mora	PLN	Jorge Denis Mora	PLN
Alajuela	285,259	Laura María Chaves	PLN	Humberto Soto Herrera	PLN
San Ramón	86,312	Nixon Gerardo Ureña	PLN	Nixon Gerardo Ureña	PLN
Grecia	85,087	Minor Molina	PLN	Francisco Murillo Quesada	PUSC
San Mateo	7,600	Jairo Emilio Guzmán	PLN	Jairo Emilio Guzmán	PLN
Atenas	27,112	Wilberth Martín Aguilar	PUSC	Wilberth Martín Aguilar	PUSC
Naranjo	45,005	Juan Luis Chaves	PUSC	Juan Luis Chaves	PUSC
Palmares	37,471	Hugo Virgilio Rodríguez	PAC	Katerine Mayela Ramírez	PPP
Poás	30,650	José Joaquín Brenes	PLN	Heibel Antonio Rodríguez	PUSC
Orotina	21,430	Margot Montero	PLN	Benjamín Rodríguez Vega	PLN
San Carlos	178,460	Alfredo Córdoba Soro	PLN	Alfredo Córdoba Soro	PLN
Zarcero	13,215	Ronald Araya Solís	PLN	Ronald Araya Solís	PLN
Sarchí	20,466	Luis Óscar Quesada	PUSC	Maikol Gerardo Porras	APS
Upala	48,910	Juan Bosco Acevedo	PLN	Aura Yamileth López	PLN
Los Chiles	28,694	Jacobo Guillén Miranda	PLN	Jacobo Guillén Miranda	PLN
Guatuso	17,507	Ilse María Gutiérrez	PLN	Ilse María Gutiérrez	PLN
Río Cuarto	15,152	-	-	José Miguel Jiménez Araya	PLN
Cartago	147,898	Rolando Alberto Rodríguez	PLN	Mario Redondo Poveda	ADC
Paraíso	57,743	Laura Rebeca Morales	PASE	Carlos Ramírez Sánchez	PLN
La Unión	99,400	Luis Carlos Villalobos	PLN	Cristian Torres Garita	PLN
Jiménez	14,669	Lisette Fernández	PLN	Lisette Fernández	PLN
Turrialba	69,616	Luis Fernando León	PAC	Luis Fernando León	PAC
Alvarado	14,312	Juan Felipe Martínez	PLN	Juan Felipe Martínez	PLN
Oreamuno	45,473	Catalina Coghi	PLN	Erick Jiménez Valverde	UP
El Guarco	41,793	Víctor Luis Arias	PLN	Victor Luis Arias	PLN
Heredia	123,616	José Manuel Ulate	PLN	José Manuel Ulate	PLN
Barva	40,660	Claudio Manuel Segura	FA	Jorge Acuña Prado	PRSC
Santo Domingo	40,072	Randall Arturo Madrigal	PLN	Roberto González Rodríguez	MAS
Santa Bárbara	37,428	Héctor Luis Arias	PLN	Víctor Hidalgo Solís	PLN
San Rafael	45,965	Verny Gustavo Valerio	PLN	Verny Gustavo Valerio	PLN
San Isidro	20,633	Ana Lideth Hernández	PUSC	Ana Lidieth Hernández	PUSC
Belén	21,633	Horacio Martín Alvarado	PUSC	Horacio Martín Alvarado	PUSC
Flores	20,037	Gerardo Antonio Rojas	PLN	Eder José Ramírez Segura	PLN
San Pablo	27,671	Bernardo Porras	PUSC	Bernardo Porras	PUSC
Sarapiquí	57,147	Pedro Rojas	PLN	Pedro Rojas	PLN
Liberia	72,528	Julio Alexander Viales	PLN	Luis Gerardo Castañeda	PUSC
Nicoya	50,825	Marco Antonio Jiménez	PLN	Carlos Martínez Arias	LGN
Santa Cruz	64,118	María Rosa López	PLN	Jorge Arturo Alfaro Orias	PASC
Bagaces	19,536	William Guido	PLN	Eva Vásquez Vásquez	PUSC
Carrillo	41,390	Carlos Gerardo Cantillo	PLN	Carlos Gerardo Cantillo	PLN
Cañas	36,201	Luis Fernando Mendoza	PLN	Luis Fernando Mendoza	PLN
Abangares	18,039	Anabelle Matarrita	PLN	Heriberto Cubero Morera	PLN
Tilarán	19,640	Juan Pablo Barquero	PLN	Juan Pablo Barquero	PLN
Nandayure	11,121	Giovanni Jiménez	PNG	Giovanni Jiménez	PNI
La Cruz	19,181	Junnier Alberto Salazar	PUSC	Luis Alonso Alan Corea	PNG
Hojancha	7,197	Eduardo Pineda	PAC	Eduardo Pineda	PAC
Puntarenas	130,462	Randall Alexis Chavarría	PUSC	Wilber Madriz Arguedas	PLN
Esparza	28,644	Asdrúbal Calvo	PLN	Asdrúbal Calvo	PLN
Buenos Aires	45,244	José Bernardino Rojas	PLN	José Bernardino Rojas	PLN
Montes de Oro	12,950	Luis Alberto Villalobos	PAC	Luis Alberto Villalobos	PAC
Osa	29,433	Jorge Alberto Cole	PLN	Jorge Alberto Cole	PLN
Quepos	3,133	Patricia Mayela Bolaños	PUSC	Jong Kwan Kim Jin	PLN
Golfito	39,150	Elberth Barrantes	PLN	Freiner William Lara Blanco	PUSC
Coto Brus	38,453	Rafael Ángel Navarro	PUSC	Steven Alberto Barrantes	PLN
Parrita	16,115	Freddy Garro Arias	PLN	Freddy Garro Arias	PLN
Corredores	41,831	Carlos Viales Fallas	PLN	Carlos Viales Fallas	PLN
Garabito	22,767	Tobías Murillo Rodríguez	PLN	Tobías Murillo Rodríguez	PLN
Limón	98,459	Nestor Mattis Williams	PAL	Nestor Mattis Williams	PAL
Pococí	142,171	Elibeth Venegas	PLN	Manuel Hernández Rivera	PAREVA
Siquirres	56,786	Mangell McLean	PLN	Mangell McLean	PLN
Talamanca	39,838	Marvin Antonio Gómez	PUSC	Rugeli Morals Rodríguez	PUSC
Matina	37,721	Jeannette González	PLN	Wálter Céspedes Salazar	PUSC
Guácimo	41,266	Gerardo Fuentes	PLN	Gerardo Fuentes	PLN

Vote percentage
1. PLN (31.4%)
2. PUSC (17.4%)
3. Cantonal parties (10.1%)
4. PAC (7.34%)
5. PNR (5.46%)
6. PNG (4.69%)
7. PRSC (4.25%)
8. PREN (3.99%)
9. ADC (2.92%)
10. UP (2.61%)
11. PIN (2.38%)
12. FA (2.09%)
13. Other (5.45%)

Party	Mayors		Popular vote	
Party	Number	Change	Votes	%
National Liberation Party	43	▼7	374,990	31.42
Social Christian Unity Party	15	▲1	207,075	17.35
Total cantonal parties	9	▲5	119,960	10.05
Citizens' Action Party	5	▼2	87,631	7.34
New Republic Party	0	New	65,213	5.46
New Generation Party	4	▲1	55,972	4.69
Social Christian Republican Party	2	▲1	50,689	4.25
National Restoration Party	0	Steady	47,617	3.99
Christian Democratic Alliance	1	▲1	34,845	2.92
United We Can	1	New	31,166	2.61
National Integration Party	0	Steady	28,379	2.38
Broad Front	0	▼1	24,974	2.09
Our Town Party	0	New	13,430	1.13
United Communal Party	1	New	8,604	0.72
Recovering Values Party	1	▲1	7,305	0.61
Let's Act Now Party	0	New	6,738	0.56
Costa Rican Social Justice Party	0	New	5,769	0.48
Authentic Limonense Party	1	Steady	5,653	0.47
Accessibility without Exclusion	0	▼1	4,880	0.41
Liberal Progressive Party	0	New	4,209	0.35
Costa Rican Renewal Party	0	Steady	3,386	0.28
Guancastecan Union Party	0	New	3,358	0.28
Green Ecologist Party	0	Steady	1,432	0.12
Costa Rican Left Party	0	New	343	0.03
Total	82	▲1	1,193,618	100%

By province

Province	PLN %	PUSC %	Reg. %	PAC %	PNR %	PNG %	PRSC %	PREN %	ADC %	UP %	PIN %	FA %	PASE %	PLP %	PRC %
San José Province	29.20	16.46	19.12	6.54	5.16	7.57	3.36	3.68	0.51	2.15	1.10	2.49	-	0.29	0.41
Alajuela	36.82	22.74	9.07	6.41	6.04	3.54	5.88	1.86	0.32	1.38	1.08	1.61	-	0.75	-
Cartago Province	21.46	10.22	10.74	14.59	2.26	4.45	1.99	4.99	14.59	4.41	4.06	2.63	2.75	0.85	-
Heredia	34.63	21.17	11.07	7.28	7.04	2.54	5.99	1.63	1.05	2.04	0.43	4.31	-	-	0.81
Guanacaste	30.60	16.98	21.37	6.64	3.79	3.05	2.57	4.45	-	4.16	5.41	0.75	-	-	0.24
Puntarenas	38.41	18.62	6.09	3.44	8.30	1.90	6.96	5.71	1.95	2.66	5.61	0.11	0.03	-	0.22
Limón	24.33	15.25	22.40	1.87	5.48	4.94	2.35	8.30	6.51	3.13	1.98	2.29	0.67	-	0.49
Total	31.42	17.35	14.45	7.34	5.46	4.69	4.25	3.99	2.92	2.61	2.38	2.09	0.41	0.35	0.28
Source: TSE

==== Municipal councils, syndics, district councils ====
Parties and coalitions	Popular vote			Alderpeople			Popular vote			Syndics		District Councillors	
Parties and coalitions	Votes	%	±pp	Total	+/-		Votes	%	±pp	Total	+/-	Total	+/-
National Liberation Party (PLN)	351,367	29,23	-1.59	171	-17		349,611	29.08	-1.84	260	-33	855	-617
Social Christian Unity Party (PUSC)	201,290	16,74	-1.37	99	-4		204,382	17.00	-1.19	95	+18	375	-123
Citizens' Action Party (PAC)	81,781	6,80	-4.81	34	-29		81,570	6.79	-4.98	18	-19	111	-358
New Republic Party (PNR)	70,560	5,87	New	17	New		61,320	5.10	New	1	New	32	New
Social Christian Republican Party (PRSC)	54,767	4,56	-1.75	23	-1		52,598	4.38	-2.05	10	-1	66	-90
New Generation Party (PNG)	53,752	4,47	+0.59	24	-10		54,542	4.53	+0.74	14	+2	76	+17
National Restoration Party (PREN)	52,954	4,40	+3.15	10	+7		51,262	4.26	+3.34	3	+3	23	+23
United We Can Party (UP)	36,660	3,05	New	11	New		37,815	3.15	New	5	New	36	New
Christian Democratic Alliance (ADC)	33,227	2,76	+1.64	8	+4		32,865	2.73	+1.62	13	+13	34	+5
Broad Front (FA)	30,407	2,53	-2.83	9	-10		26,232	2.18	-3.19	1	-2	18	-52
National Integration Party (PIN)	29,113	2,42	+1.28	9	+4		25,368	2.11	+1.00	7	+3	40	+25
Our Town Party (PNP)	14,844	1,23	New	3	New		15,135	1.26	New	1	New	16	New
United Communal Party (PCU)	8,837	0,74	New	5	New		9,630	0.58	New	6	New	28	New
Let's Act Now (Actuemos Ya) (PAY)	8,062	0,67	New	3	New		8,248	0.69	New	1	New	6	New
Accessibility without Exclusion Party (PASE)	6,803	0,57	-1.34	2	-6		5,538	0.46	-1.42	2	0	8	-14
We Are Moravia Party (PSM)	6,213	0,52	New	4	New		6,263	0.52	New	3	New	7	New
Progreser Party (PP)	6,116	0,51	New	2	New		6,319	0.53	New	0	New	8	New
Costa Rican Social Justice Party (PJSCR)	6,103	0,51	New	3	New		5,987	0.50	New	4	New	8	New
Recovering Values Party (PAREVA)	5,792	0,48	+0.31	1	0		6,205	0.52	+0.35	3	+3	9	+9
Authentic Limonense Party (PAL)	5,780	0,48	-0.59	2	-3		5,745	0.48	-0.63	1	-3	4	-4
Alajuelan Awakening Party (PDA)	5,712	0,48	New	1	New		6,137	0.51	New	0	New	3	-
Escazu's Progressive Yoke (YPE)	5,668	0,47	-0.38	3	-1		5,652	0.47	-0.37	0	-3	4	-3
Authentic Santacrucene Party (PASC)	5,125	0,43	New	2	New		5,137	0.43	New	2	New	9	New
Liberal Progressive Party (PLP)	4,964	0,41	New	2	New		3,736	0.31	New	1	New	8	New
21st Century Curridabat (CSXXI)	4,889	0,41	-0.23	3	0		5,050	0.42	-0.22	4	0	7	-3
The Great Nicoya Party (PLGN)	4,811	0,40	New	2	New		5,137	0.43	New	2	New	4	New
Alliance for San José Party (PASJ)	4,760	0,40	-1.33	1	-3		4,877	0.41	-1.31	0	-10	2	-19
Union of Entrepreneur Puntarenenseans Party (UPE)	4,437	0,37	New	1	New		4,527	0.38	New	1	New	9	New
Costa Rican Renewal Party (PRC)	4,136	0,34	-2.65	2	-8		5,046	0.42	-2.58	0	-7	2	-5
People of Montes de Oca Coalition (PAC-VAM-Gente-Humanist) (CGMO)	4,118	0,34	-0.01	2	0		4,122	0.34	-0.02	3	-1	7	+2
Santo Domingo Advancement Movement (MAS)	4,077	0,34	+0.07	2	+1		4,349	0.36	+0.07	6	+4	15	+7
New Greek Majority Party (PNMG)	3,999	0,33	-0.13	1	–2		4,056	0.33	-0.13	2	0	7	–3
Together Coalition (FA-SJO Alternative Party) (Juntos)	3,934	0,33	New	1	New		3,794	0.32	New	0	New	1	New
Palmares First Party (PPP)	3,644	0,30	New	2	New		1,097	0.09	New	1	New	2	New
Guanacastecan Union Party (PUG)	3,590	0,30	New	2	New		3,695	0.31	New	0	New	3	New
Party of the Sun (PdS)	3,396	0,28	+0.08	2	+1		3,161	0.26	+0.05	1	+1	6	+1
Authenthc Labourer of Coronado Party (PALABRA)	2,941	0,24	-0.02	1	-1		3,045	0.25	-0.02	1	+1	4	-1
Ramonense League Party (PALIRA)	2,598	0,22	+0.07	1	0		-	-	-	0	0	0	-2
United for Development Party (PUEDE)	2,523	0,21	New	1	New		2,724	0.23	New	2	New	6	New
Turrialba First Party (PATUPRI)	2,515	0,21	New	1	New		2,788	0.23	New	1	New	10	New
Terra Escazú (TE)	2,378	0,20	New	1	New		2,377	0.20	New	0	New	2	New
Belemite Union Coalition (FA-Belemite Party) (CUB)	2,320	0,19	New	2	New		2,384	0.20	New	0	New	2	New
Costa Rican Communal Ecological Party (PECCR)	2,285	0,19	-0.14	1	0		2,296	0.19	-0.16	0	0	0	-5
Feel Heredia Party (PSH)	2,247	0,19	New	1	New		2,301	0.19	New	0	New	1	New
All for Goicoechea Party (PTxG)	2,234	0,19	New	2	New		2,342	0.19	New	0	New	3	New
Cantonal Rescue La Unión Party (PRCLU)	2,096	0,17	-0.11	1	0		2,180	0.18	-0.10	0	0	3	-4
Unity for Flores Coalition (PUSC-All for Flores Party) (CUxF)	2,008	0,17	New	2	New		2,094	0.17	New	0	New	3	New
Cantonal of Carrillo Party (PCdC)	1,954	0,16	New	1	New		2,011	0.17	New	0	New	3	New
Ateniense Union Party (PUA)	1,918	0,16	+0.16	1	+1		2,091	0.17	+0.17	1	+1	10	+10
Social Alliance for La Unión Party (ASLU)	1,894	0,16	-0.10	1	0		1,975	0.16	-0.11	0	-1	1	-3
Alliance For Nicoya Coalition (PAC-FA-Nicoya Party) (CAN)	1,888	0,16	New	1	New		1,956	0.16	New	0	New	3	New
Greek Union Party (PUGRI)	1,840	0,15	New	1	New		1,991	0.17	New	0	New	1	New
Authentic Nicoyan Party (PAN)	1,829	0,15	New	1	New		-	-	-	-	New	-	New
Alliance for Sarchí Party (PAxS)	1,743	0,14	New	2	New		1,761	0.15	New	3	New	3	New
We Are Sarchí Party (PSS)	1,704	0,14	New	2	New		1,714	0.14	New	1	New	7	New
Guarqueño Union Party (PUGUA)	1,697	0,14	-0.08	1	0		1,810	0.15	-0.07	0	0	2	-4
Nandayure Progresses Party (PANAPRO)	1,651	0,14	New	2	New		1,655	0.14	New	4	New	9	New
Green Ecologist Party (PVE)	1,605	0,13	-0.31	0	-1		1,342	0.11	-0.31	0	-1	0	-5
Alliance for Palmares Party (PAxP)	1,599	0,13	-0.11	1	0		2,206	0.18	-0.07	0	-3	8	0
Aserrí of Everyone Coalition (PUSC-PAC) (CAdT)	1,536	0,13	New	1	New		1,698	0.14	New	1	New	5	New
Garabito People Party (PPG)	1,360	0,11	+0.05	1	0		1,436	0.12	+0.06	0	0	3	+2
Domingenean Union Party (PUD)	1,296	0,11	New	1	New		1,386	0.12	New	0	New	3	New
United for Escazú Party (PUxE)	1,293	0,11	New	0	New		1,289	0.11	New	0	New	0	New
Social Justice Party (PJS)	1,259	0,10	New	1	New		1,309	0.11	New	0	New	1	New
Montes de Oca Advance Party (PAMO)	1,067	0,09	-0.10	1	0		1,058	0.09	-0.10	0	0	0	-2
Guanacaste First Party (PGP)	976	0,08	New	0	New		1,599	0.13	New	1	New	0	New
Authentic Siquirrenean Party (PASIQ)	902	0,08	-0.14	0	-2		943	0.08	-0.15	0	-1	0	-5
Puriscal Under Way Party (PPEM)	790	0,07	New	0	New		865	0.07	New	0	New	2	New
Talamancan Development Party (PDT)	784	0,07	New	0	New		878	0.07	New	0	New	0	New
Avante Pococí Party (AVANTE)	723	0,06	New	0	New		634	0.05	New	0	New	0	New
Costa Rican Anti-Corruption Party (PACO)	714	0,06	New	0	New		560	0.05	New	0	New	0	New
Cantonal Innovation Party (PIC)	582	0,05	New	0	New		501	0.04	New	0	New	0	New
Isidrenean Advance Party (PAI)	531	0,04	New	0	New		-	-	-	-	New	-	New
United Barva Party (PBU)	500	0,04	-0.02	0	0		518	0.04	-0.01	-	0	-	0
Sarchisean Force Party (PFS)	496	0,04	New	0	New		460	0.04	New	0	New	0	New
Unique Abangarean Party (PUAB)	491	0,04	+0.04	0	0		607	0.05	+0.05	0	0	0	0
Goicoechea in Action Party (PGEA)	470	0,04	+0.04	0	0		-	-	-	-	0	-	0
Naranjenean Action Party (PANAR)	466	0,04	New	0	New		406	0.03	New	0	New	0	New
Autonomous Oromontan Party (PAO)	460	0,04	-0.01	0	0		497	0.04	+0.01	0	0	0	-1
I Am The Change Party (PYSEC)	440	0,04	New	0	-		352	0.03	New	0	New	0	New
Quepos Alliance Accord Party (PAAQ)	403	0,03	-0.01	0	0		401	0.03	-0.01	0	0	0	0
Costa Rican Left Party (PIZCR)	378	0,03	New	0	New		275	0.02	-	0	New	0	New
Cantonal Action Independent Siquirres Party (PACSI)	374	0,03	-0.01	0	0		423	0.03	-0.01	0	0	0	0
Parritenean Restoration Party (PREPA)	331	0,03	-0.01	0	0		341	0.03	-0.01	0	0	0	0
The Force of La Unión Party (PFLU)	201	0,02	New	0	New		183	0.02	-	0	New	0	New
Tarrazú First Party (PTP)	190	0,02	+0.02	0	0		193	0.02	+0.02	0	0	0	0
Total	-	100.00		508	+5		1,202,168	100.00		486	+5	1944	+20
Invalid votes	-	-	-	-	-	-							
Votes cast / turnout	-	-	-	-	-	-							
Abstentions	-	-	-	-	-	-							
Registered voters	3,438,555												

Popular vote
PLN	29.23%
PUSC	16.74%
Local parties	15.85%
PAC	6.80%
PNR	5.87%
PRSC	4.56%
PNG	4.47%
PREN	4.40%
UP	3.05%
ADC	2.76%
FA	2.53%
PIN	2.42%
PASE	0.57%
PLP	0.41%
PRC	0.34%

Seats
PLN	33.66%
PUSC	19.49%
Local parties	17.13%
PAC	6.69%
PNG	4.72%
PRSC	4.53%
PNR	3.35%
UP	2.17%
PREN	1.97%
FA	1.77%
PIN	1.77%
ADC	1.57%
PASE	0.39%
PLP	0.39%
PRC	0.39%

== Gallery ==
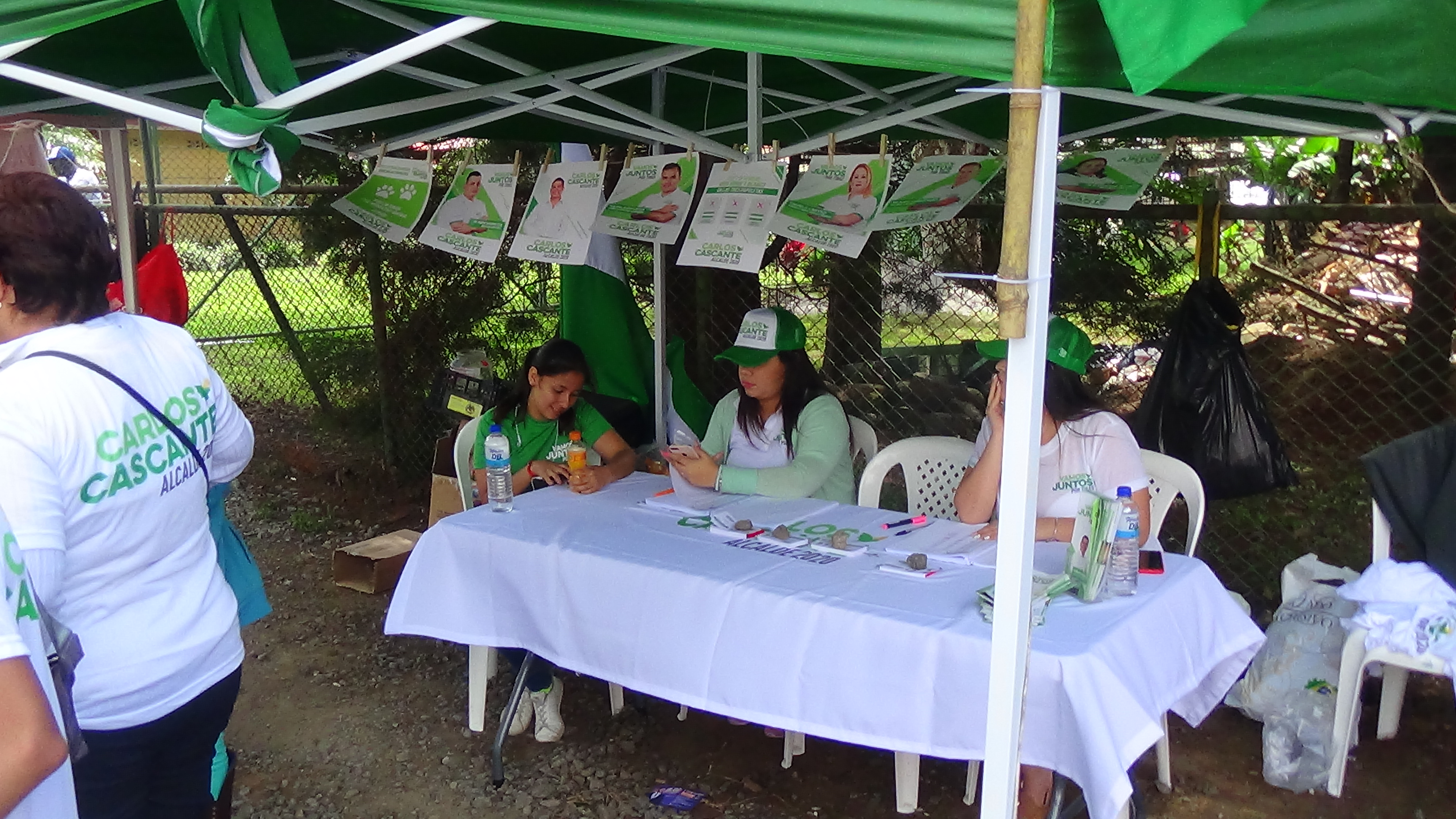
PLN stand

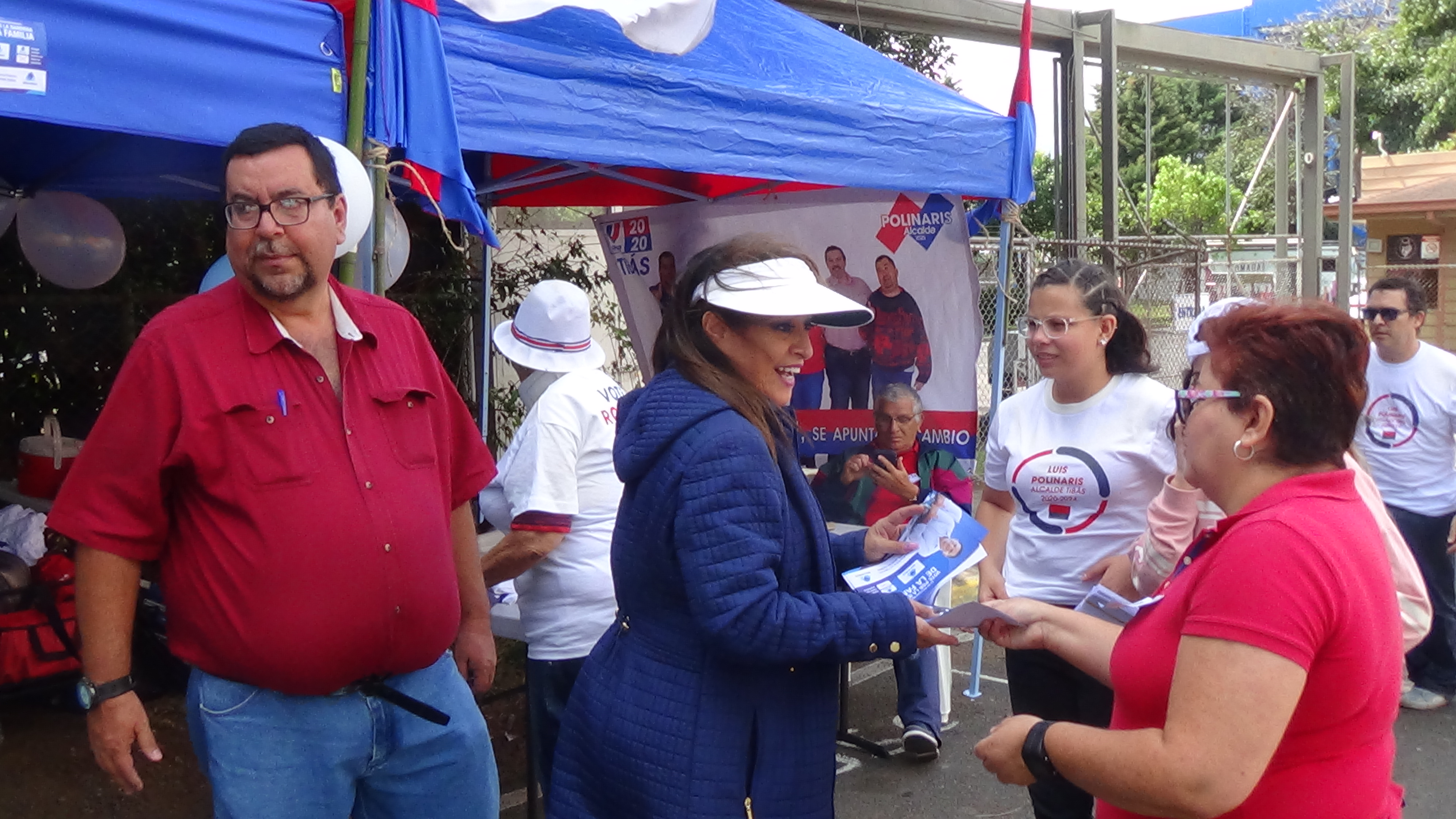
PUSC stand

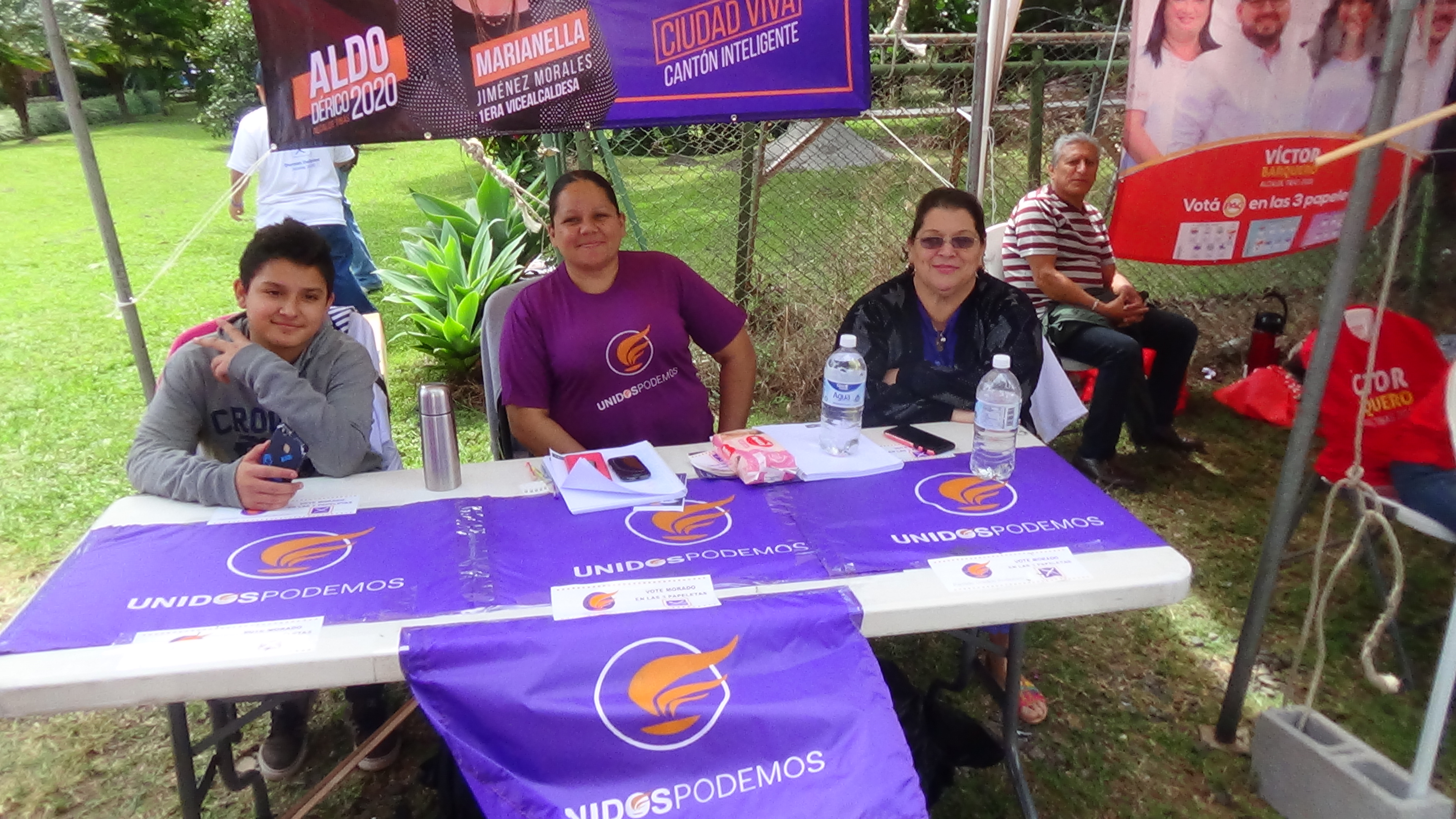
United We Can stand

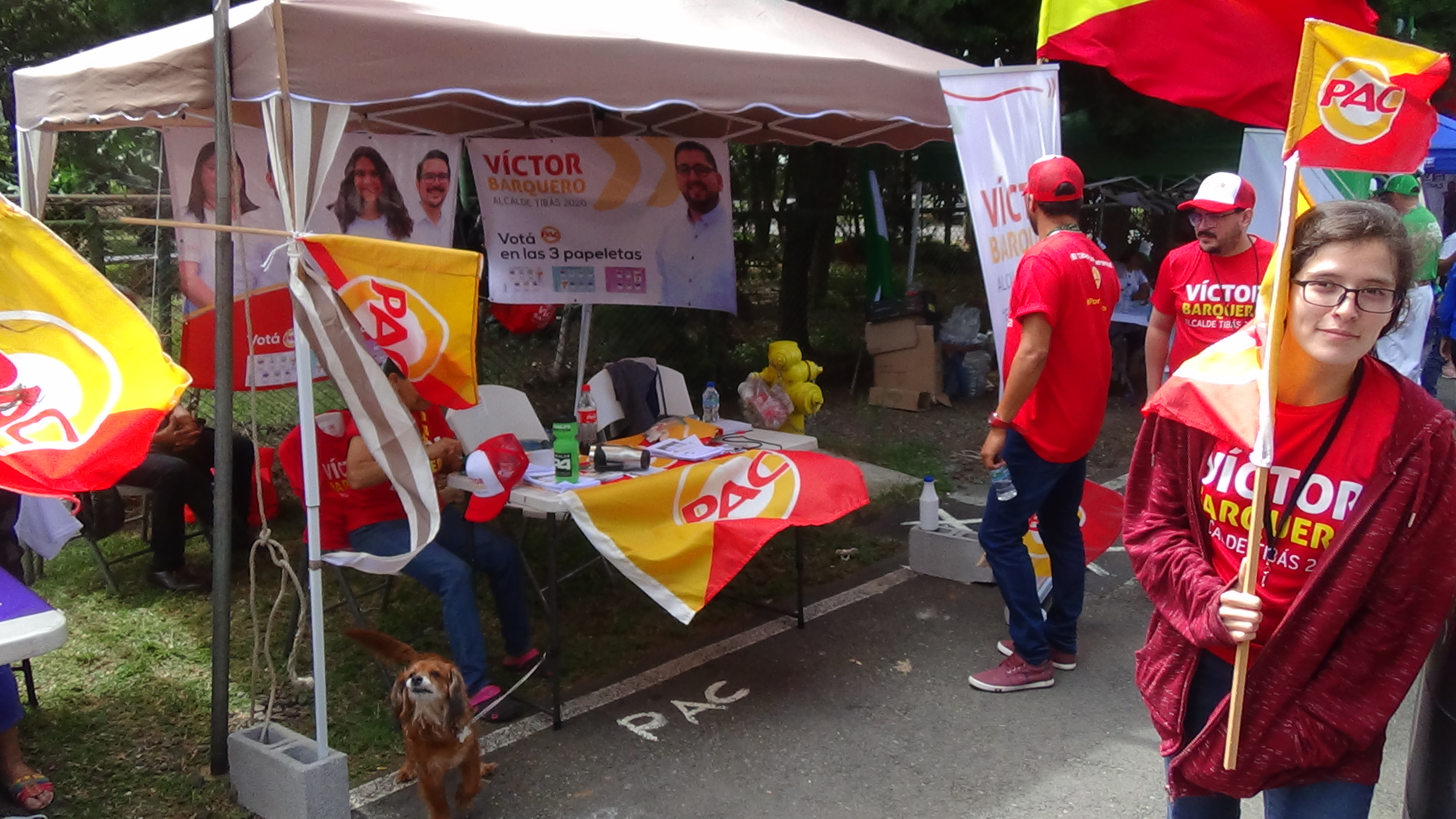
PAC stand

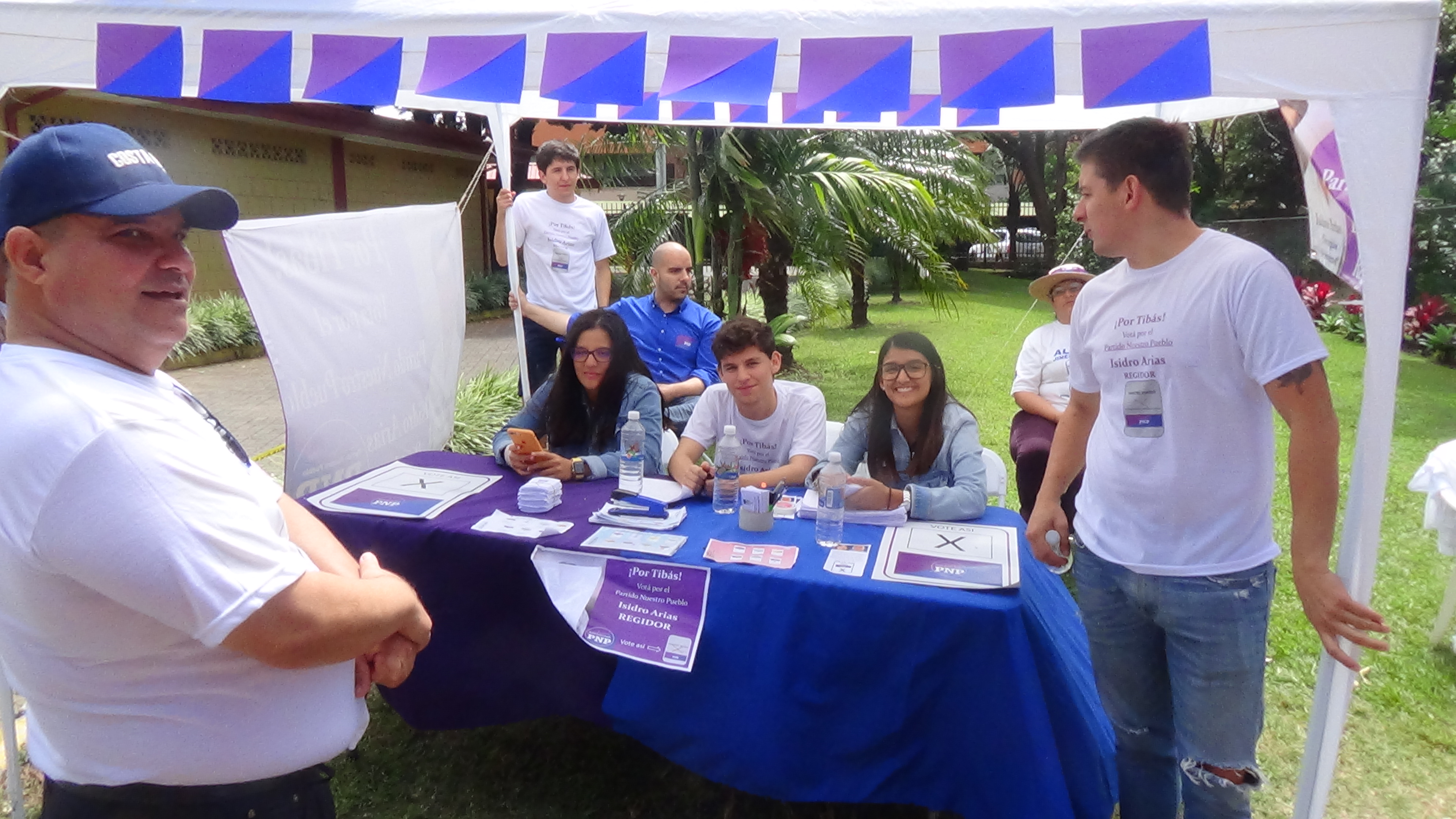
Owr Town Stand

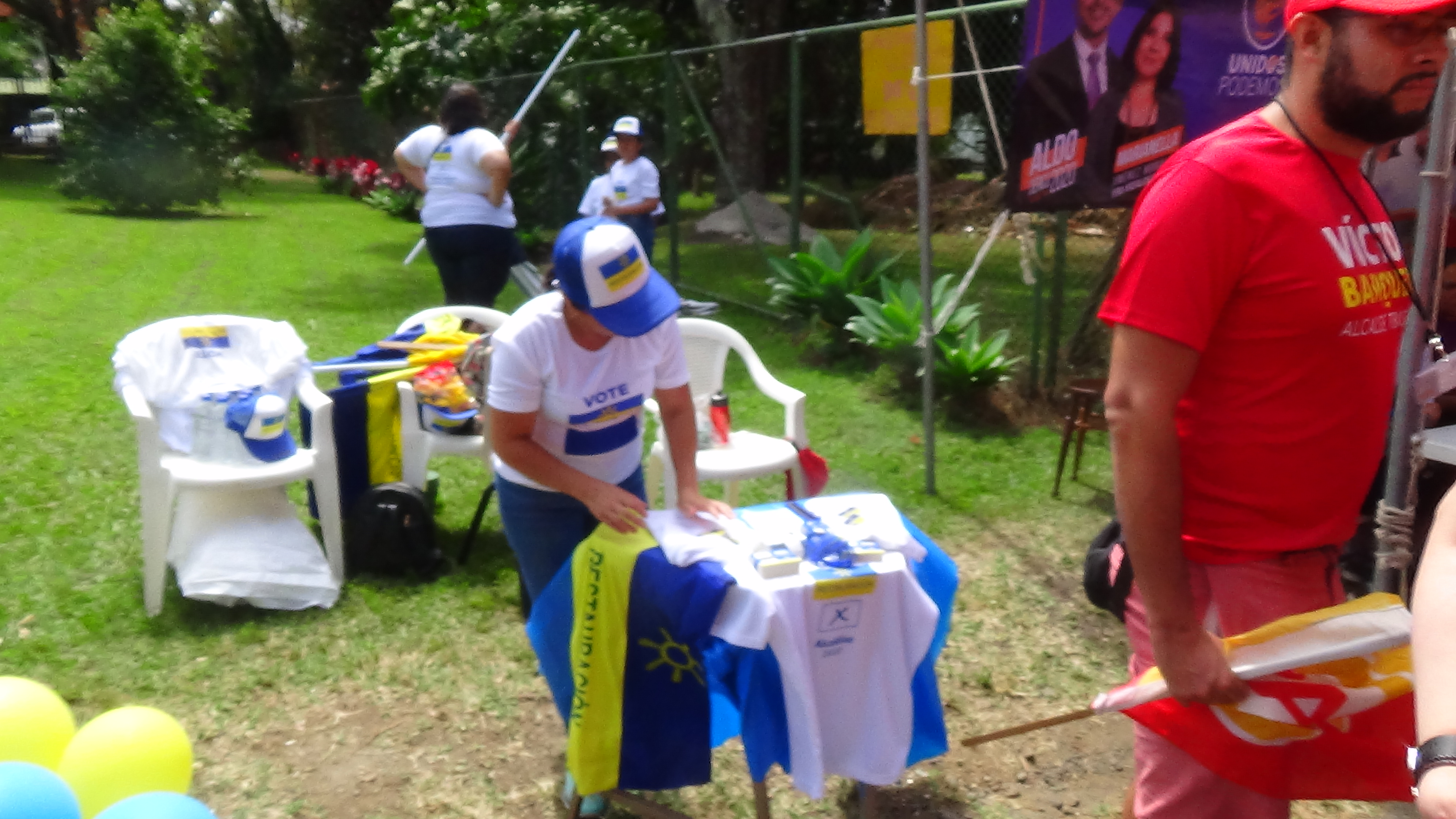
PREN stand

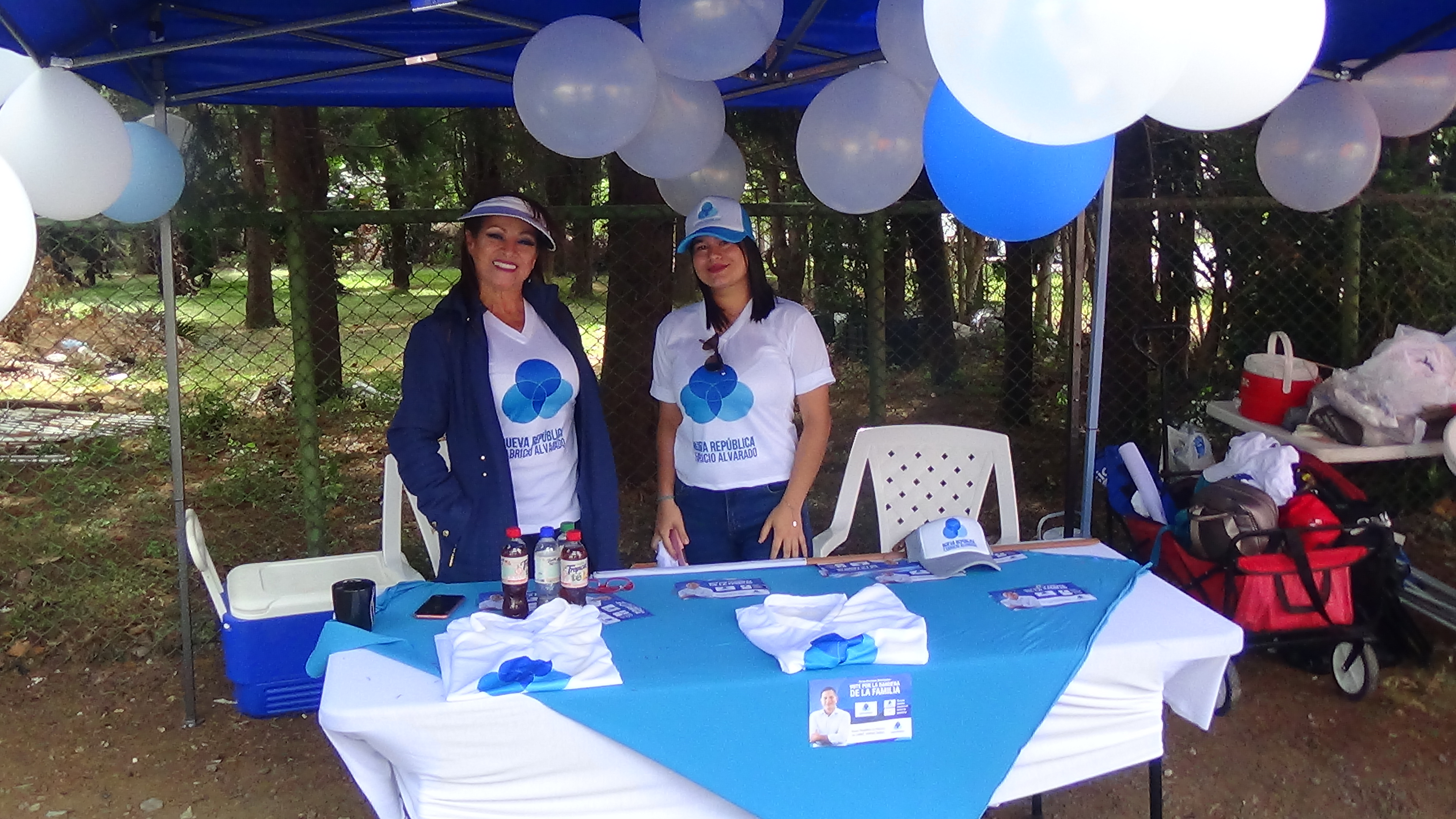
New Republic stand

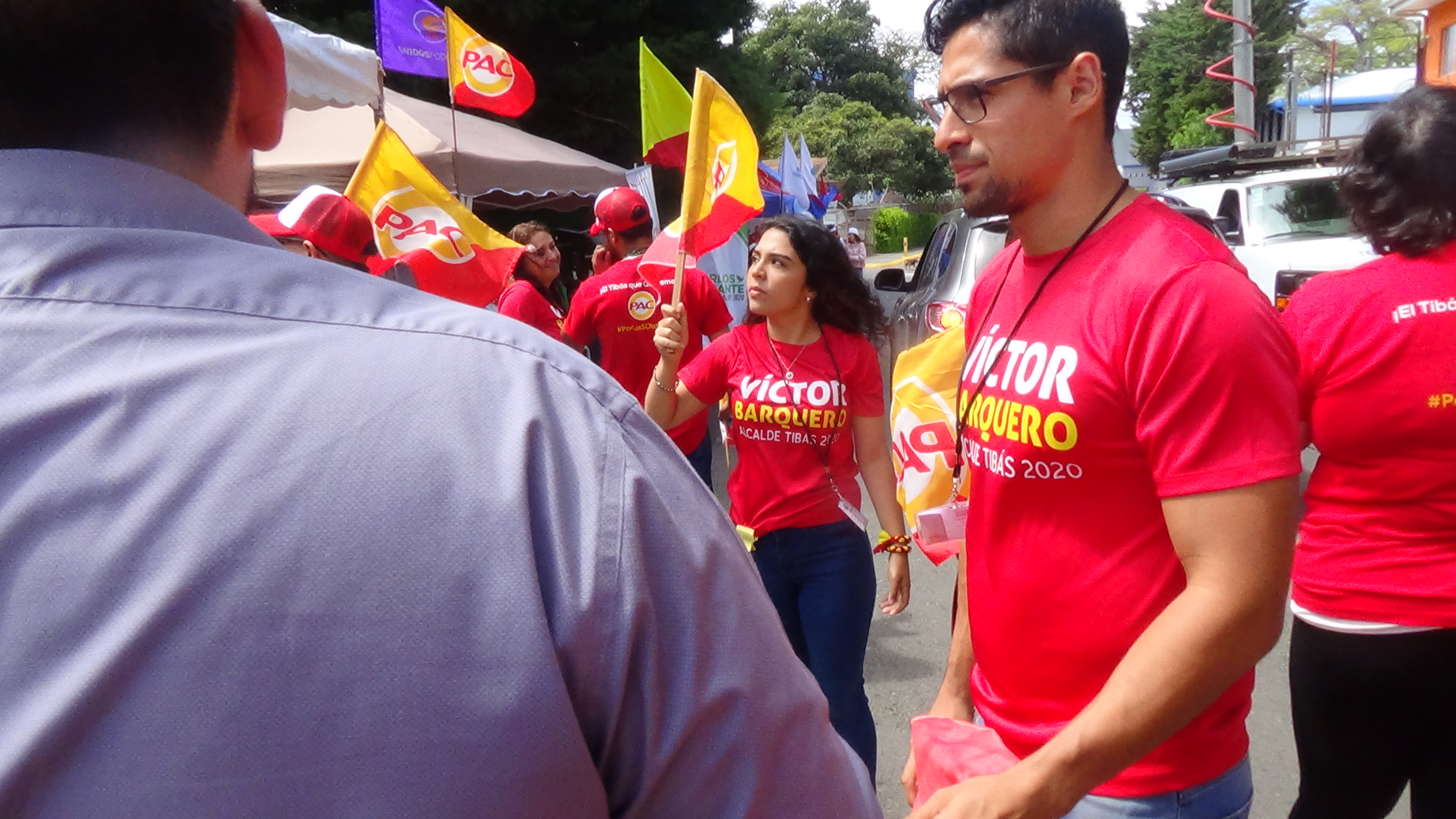
PAC sympahizers

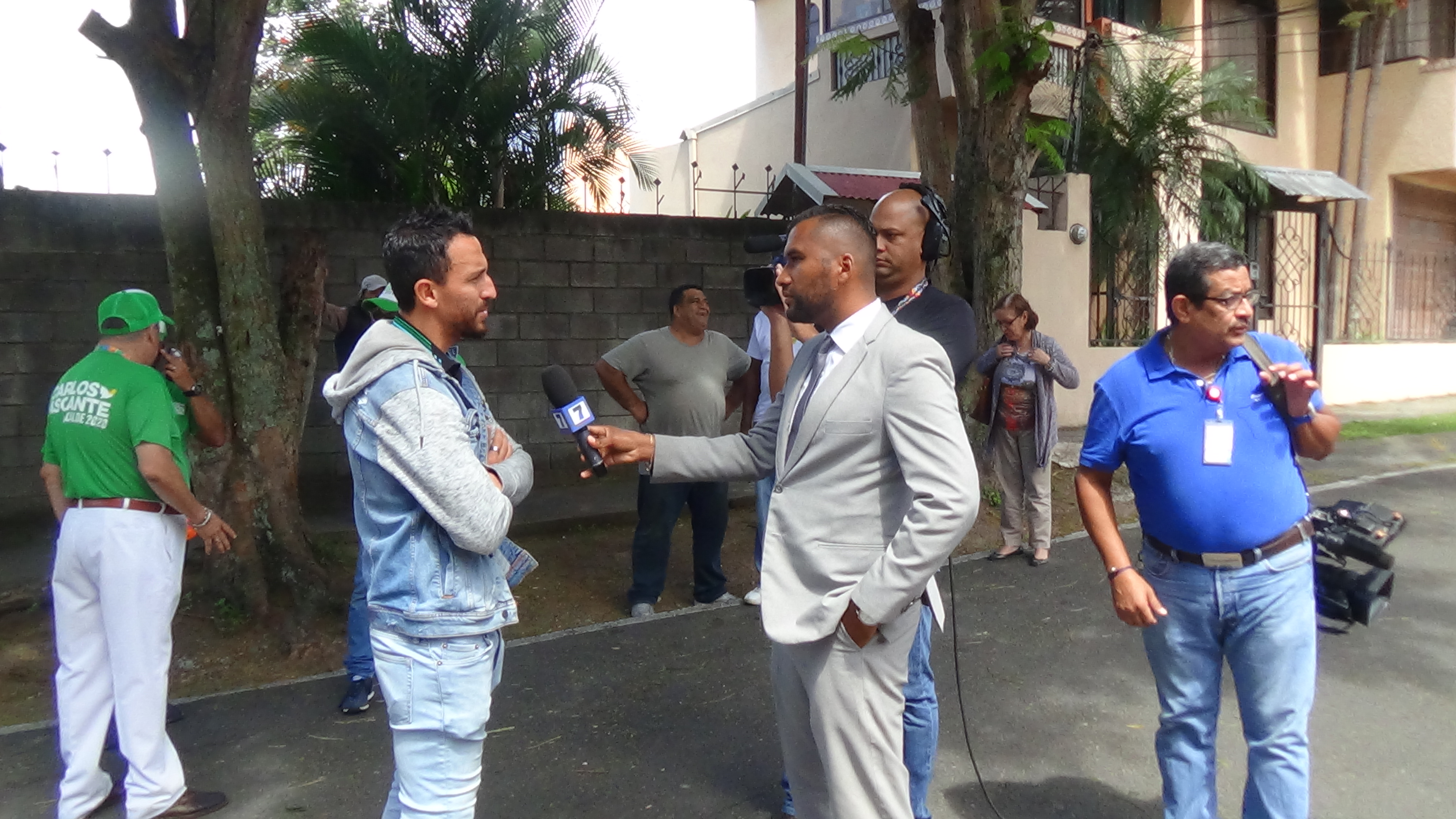
Teletica reporter interviewing voter
