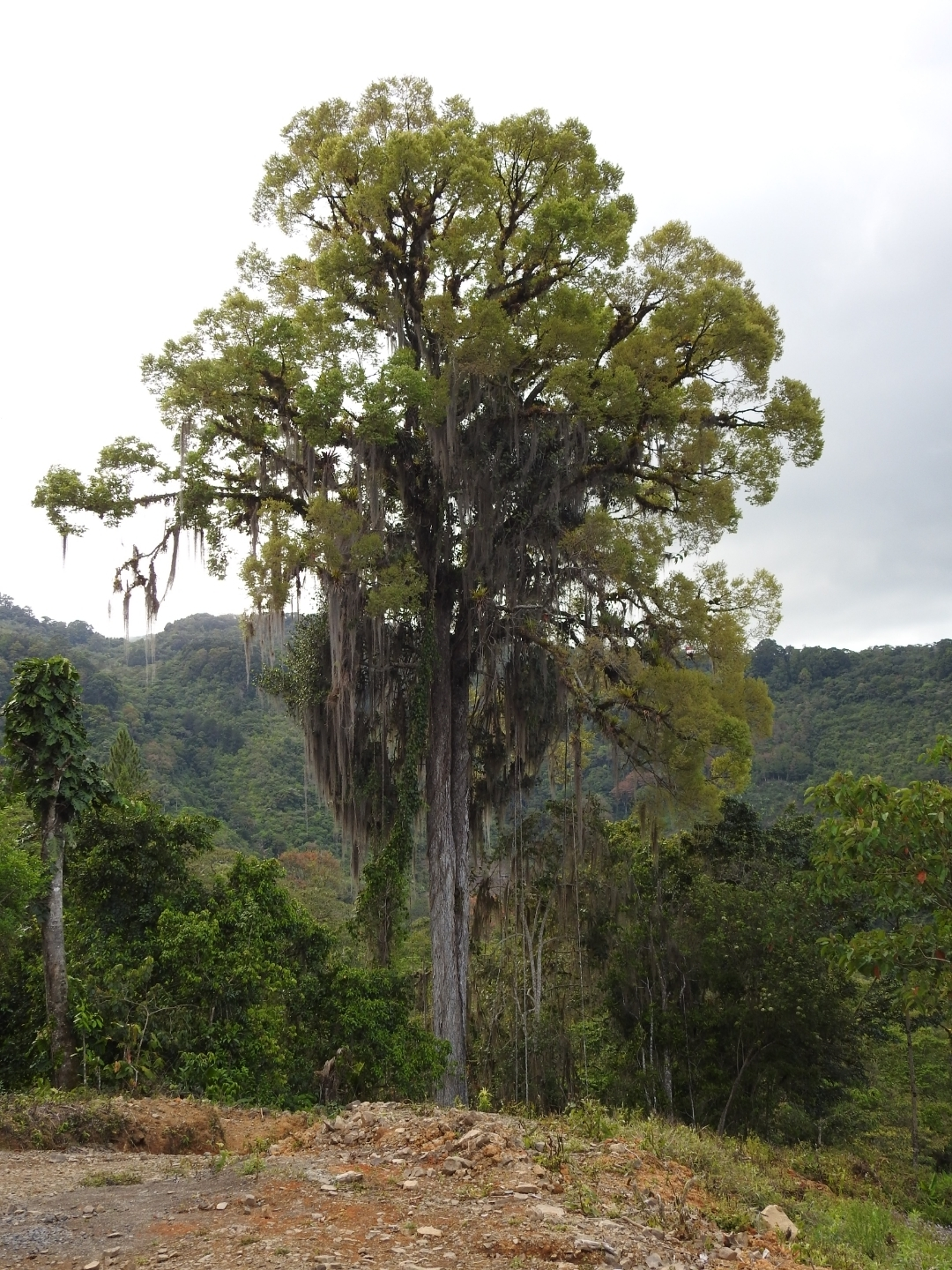
- Ulmus mexicana in Costa Rica

Conservation status
- Least Concern (IUCN 3.1)

Scientific classification
- Kingdom: Plantae
- Clade: Embryophytes
- Clade: Tracheophytes
- Clade: Spermatophytes
- Clade: Angiosperms
- Clade: Eudicots
- Clade: Rosids
- Order: Rosales
- Family: Ulmaceae
- Genus: Ulmus
- Subgenus: U. subg. Oreoptelea
- Section: U. sect. Chaetoptelea
- Species: U. mexicana

Binomial name
- Ulmus mexicana (Liebm.) Planch.

Synonyms
- Chaetoptelea mexicana Liebm.

= Ulmus mexicana =

Species of tree

Ulmus mexicana, the Mexican elm, is a large tree endemic to Mexico and Central America. It is most commonly found in cloud forest and the higher elevations (800–2,200 m (2,600–7,200 ft)) of tropical rain forest with precipitation levels of 2–4 m (79–157 in) per year, ranging from San Luis Potosi south to Chiapas in Mexico, and from Guatemala to Panama beyond. The tree was first described botanically in 1873.

== Description ==
Ulmus mexicana is one of the tallest elm species, occasionally reaching a height of 84 m (276 ft), and a d.b.h. of 2.5 m (8 feet), certainly one of the tallest trees in Mexico. The tree is also distinguished by its deeply fluted grey trunk, supporting a deep crown, its dense foliage casting a heavy shadow. The leaves vary widely in size from 3–16 cm in length by 2–7 cm breadth, elliptic to obovate, surface glossy, but dull on the underside, with petioles 5–10 mm long. The tree has distinctive racemose inflorescences up to 7 cm in length comprising nine clusters of 40 perfect apetalous wind-pollinated flowers which emerge between December and February. The small samarae, 9.0 × 2.3 mm, are covered with long straight hairs, and are shed in March . Natural regeneration is poor.

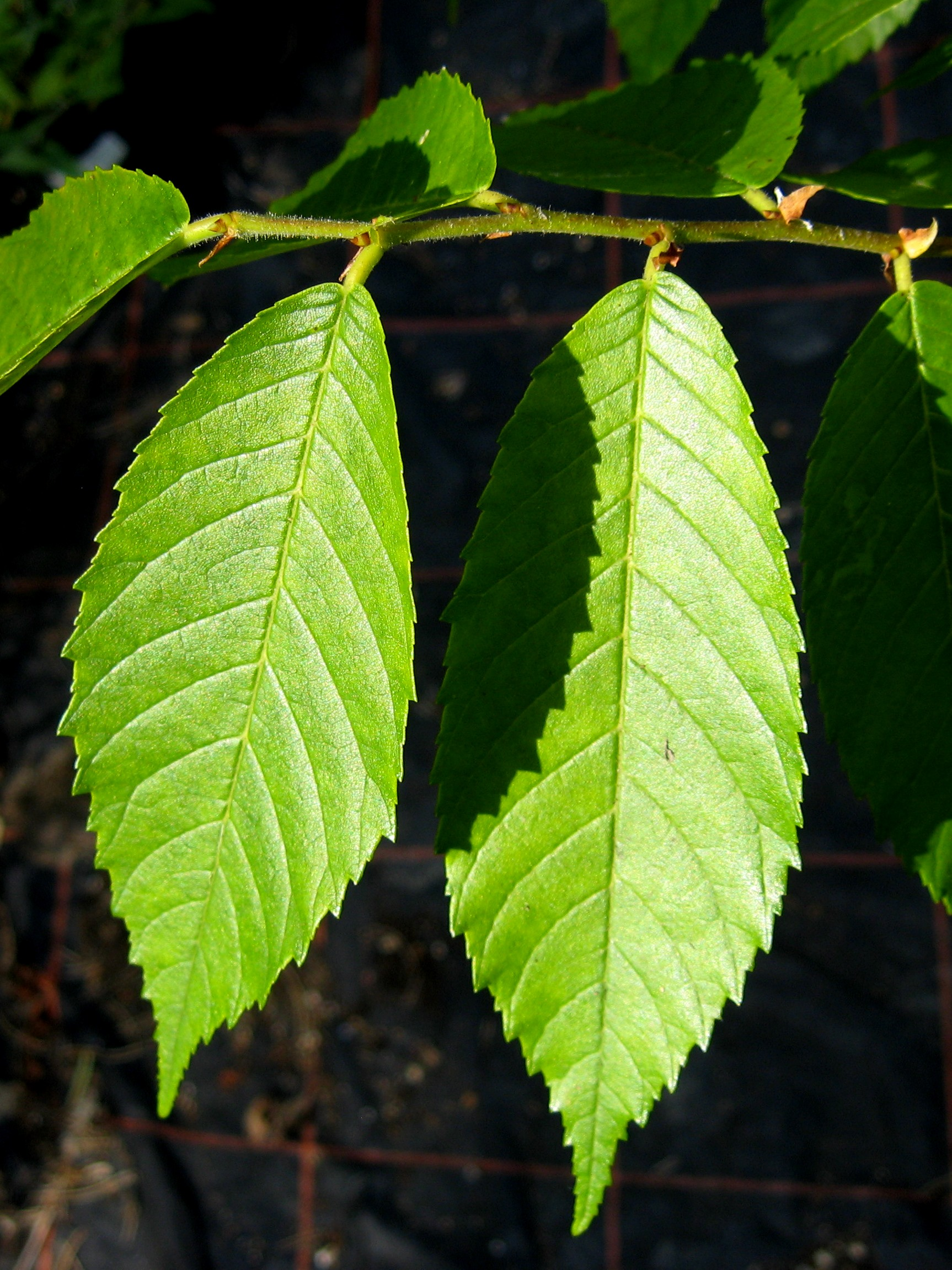
U. mexicana leaves, Ventnor Botanic Garden, Isle of Wight, UK

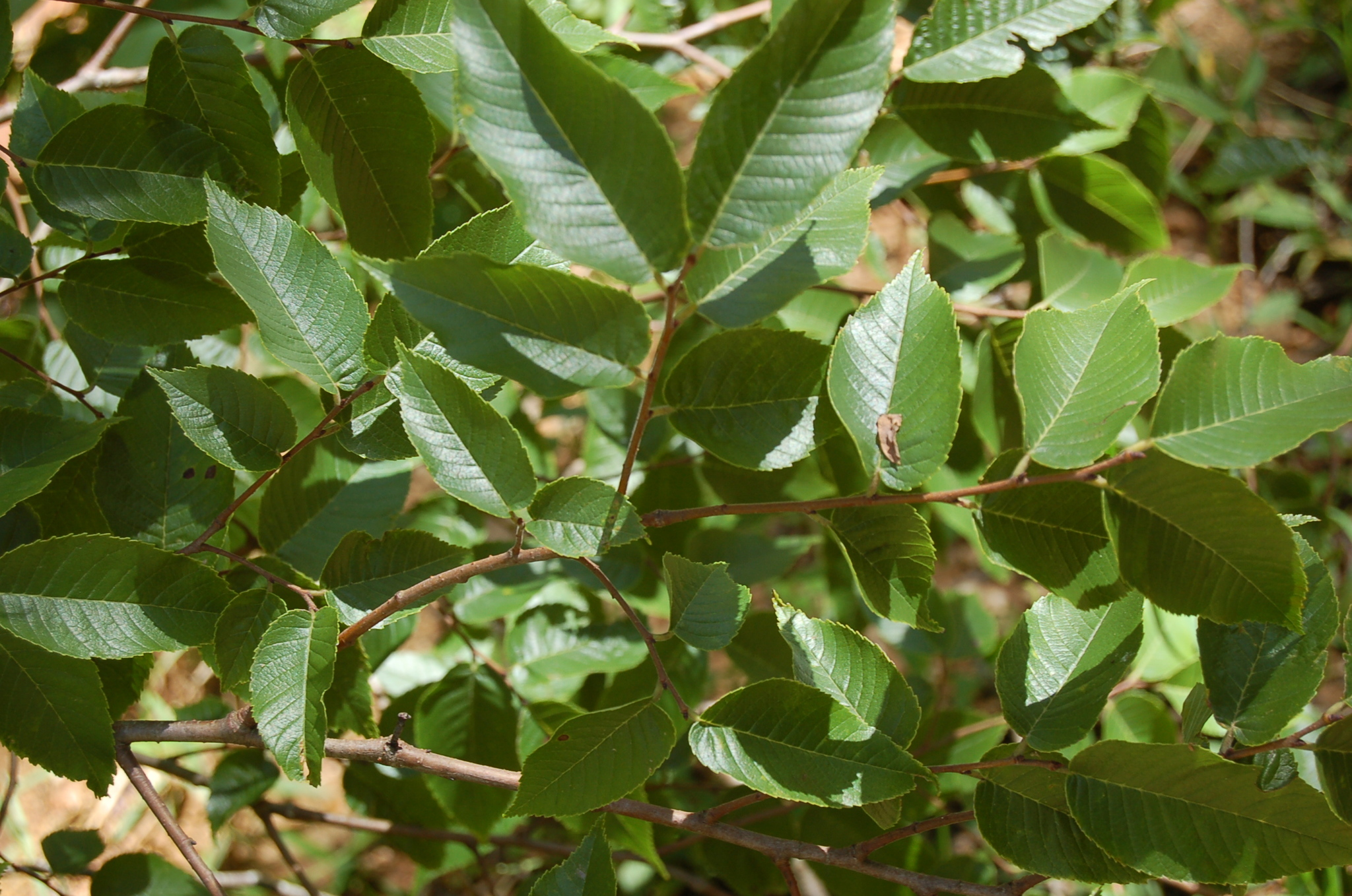
U. mexicana short and long shoots, Mexico

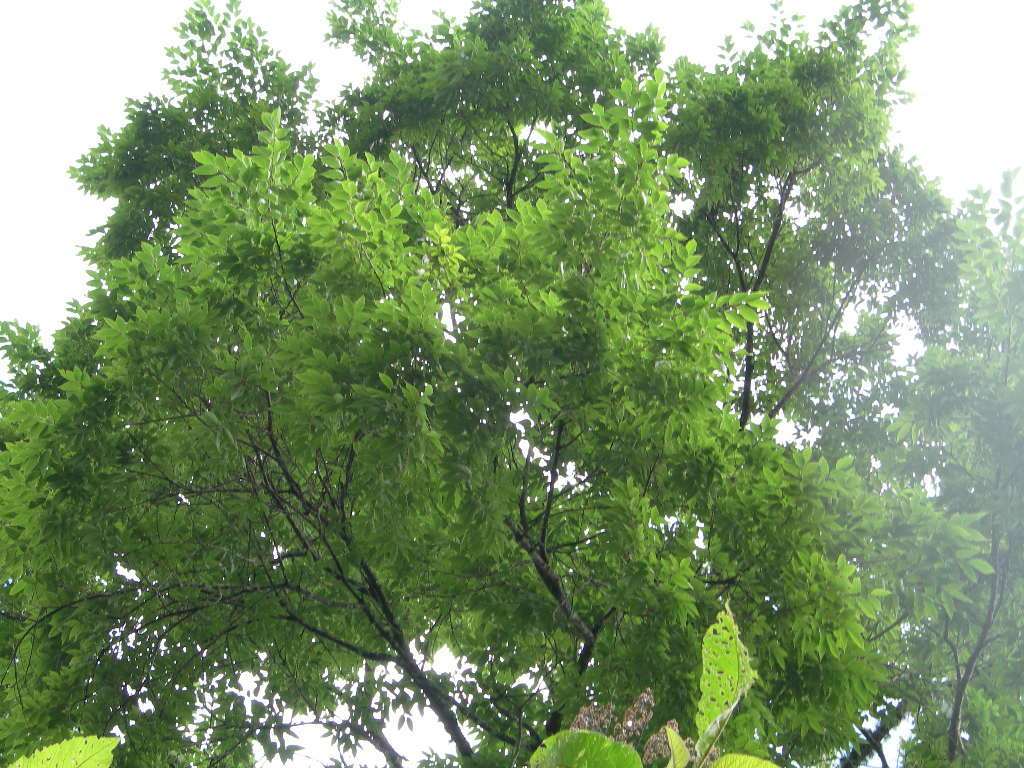
U. mexicana foliage, Mexico

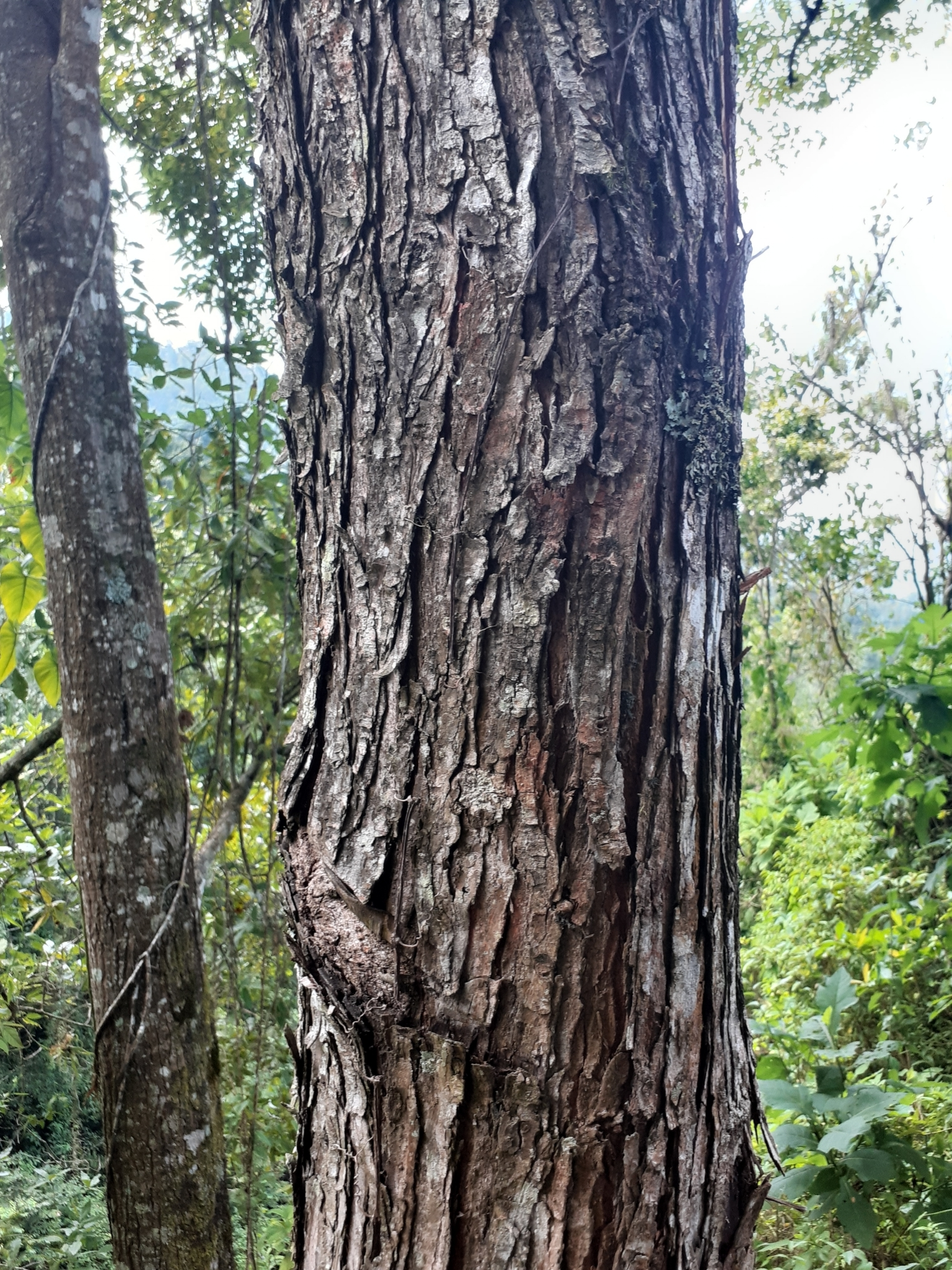
U. mexicana bark, Mexico

== Uses ==
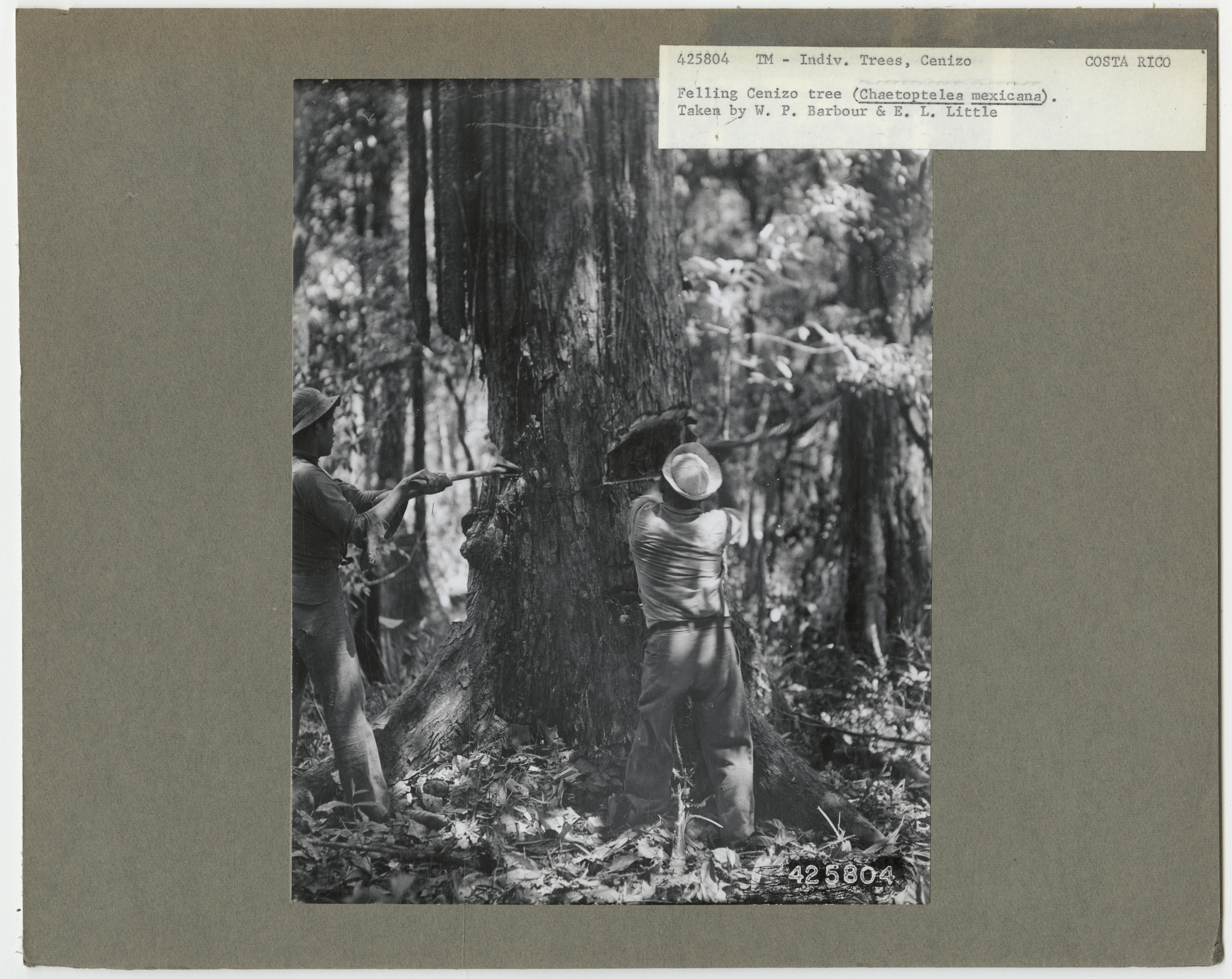
Felling an old Ulmus mexicana, Costa Rica, 1905

Although much of its natural range is threatened by deforestation, the tree is singularly unpopular in the timber trade on account of its deeply fluted trunk, and thus not considered endangered. The timber is hard and heavy (Gs 0.55), but difficult to dry, and can warp badly. Moreover, its high silica content (0.35) damages tools. The wood is used for tools, furniture, and floors, whilst the foliage is commonly used as fodder for cattle. The tree is occasionally planted for shade or ornamentation.

== Etymology ==
In Costa Rica the Mexican elm is known as Tirrá; the neighbourhood (district) of Tirrases in Curridabat, San José, takes its name from the tree.
