= National Route 252 (Costa Rica) =

National Secondary Route in Costa Rica

National Secondary Route 252
- Ruta nacional secundaria 252

Route information
- Maintained by Ministry of Public Works and Transport
- Length: 1.6 km (0.99 mi)

Major junctions
- East end: Route 2
- West end: Route 210

Location
- Country: Costa Rica

Highway system
- National Road Network of Costa Rica

National Secondary Route 252, is an arterial road from Route 2 to Route 210 in Curridabat.

== Description ==
At only 1.6 kilometers, this road segment was required to continue the Autopista Florencio del Castillo (Florencio del Castillo Highway) segment of Route 2, to the southeast of Curridabat canton, at this endpoint a right of way exists to further continue the road to further west in Curridabat canton.

== History ==
From the Curridabat west endpoint, there have been plans of either building a tunnel to the Garantías Sociales roundabout of Route 39 or an elevated highway to Route 215 in Zapote district.
