= 2002 Costa Rican municipal elections =

- 1 December 2002

81 mayors, 463 syndics, 1854 district councillors, 8 intendants, 32 municipal district councillors and their alternates

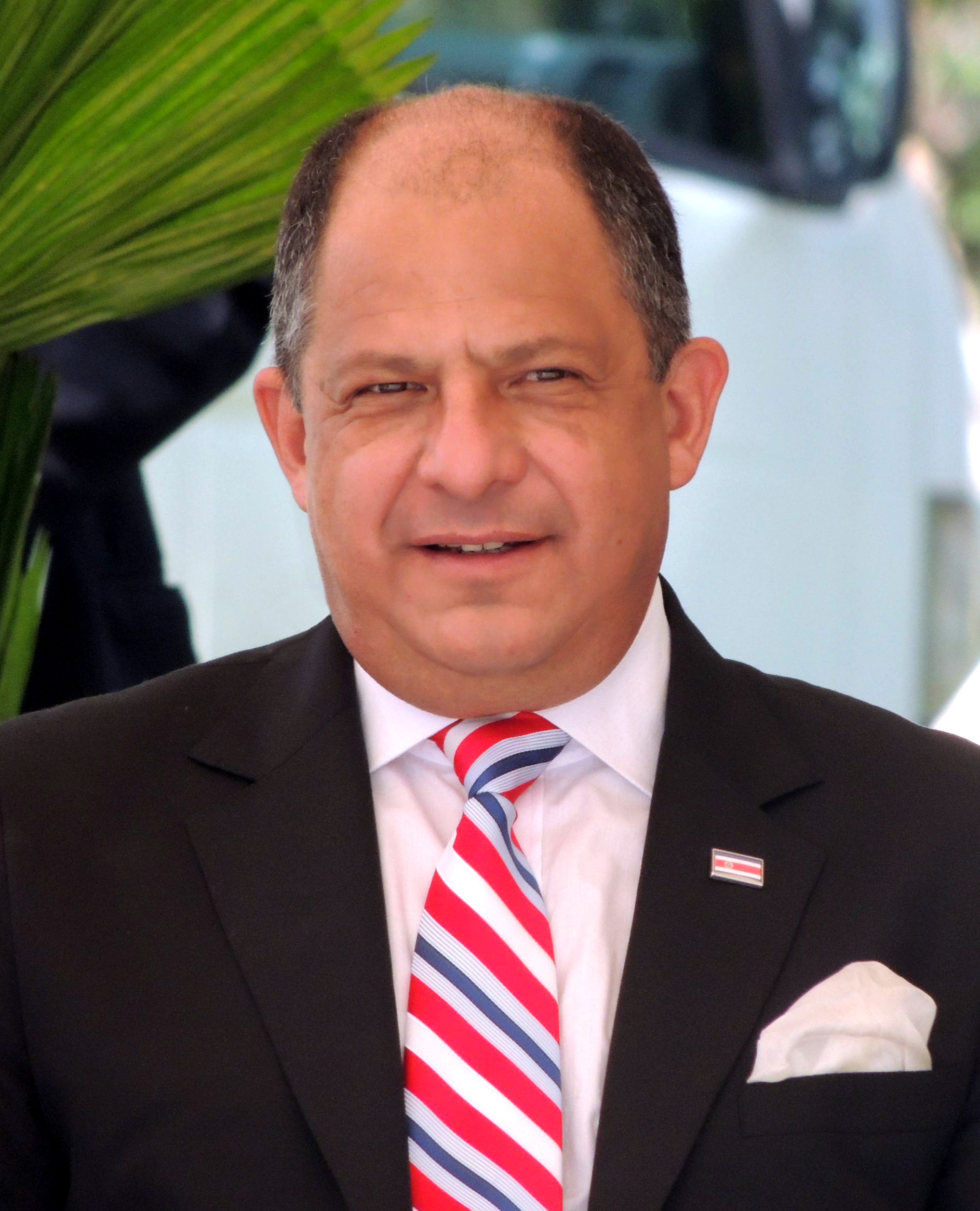

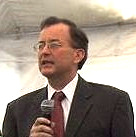
	First party	Second party	Third party
Leader	Jorge Eduardo Sánchez	Luis Guillermo Solís	Ottón Solís
Party	PUSC	PLN	PAC
Mayors	47	28	1

Municipal and local elections were held for the first time in Costa Rica on 1 December 2002. This was the first time citizens of the 81 cantons were able to directly choose their mayors as previously the municipal executive was appointed by the city council. A syndic and 4 District Councilors were also elected for each canton's district as 8 intendants for especial districts with administrative autonomy.

Then ruling Social Christian Unity Party had its best results in history on a local election gaining most of the mayors and councilors; 48 mayors and 785 syndics and councilors. National Liberation Party, then main opposition force, earn the second largest number of both with 27 mayors and 676. Costa Rica was still pretty much under a two-party system at the time even when in the recent general election the new force Citizens Action Party surprised with high voting for president and parliament, in this first municipal running achieve only one mayor in Montes de Oca (the party's hometown).

== Results ==
=== Mayors ===
List of elected mayors by canton
Cantons	Population	Elected mayor	Party
San José	309,672	Johnny Araya	PLN
Escazú	52,372	Marco Antonio Segura	PLN
Desamparados	193,478	Carlos Alberto Padilla	PLN
Puriscal	29,407	Carlos Araya	PUSC
Tarrazú	14,160	José Rodolfo Naranjo	PUSC
Aserrí	57,892	Mario Morales	PLN
Mora	21,666	Alcides Ovidio Araya	PLN
Goicoechea	117,532	Carlos Luis Murillo	PUSC
Santa Ana	48,879	Ronald Octavio Traña	PUSC
Alajuelita	70,297	Víctor Hugo Echavarría	PUSC
Vázquez de Coronado	55,585	Rolando Méndez	PUSC
Acosta	18,661	Ronald Ricardo Durán	PLN
Tibás	72,074	Percy Kenneth Rodríguez	PUSC
Moravia	50,419	Alejandro Hidalgo	PLN
Montes de Oca	50,433	Sonia María Montero	PAC
Turrubares	4,877	Roberto González	PUSC
Dota	6,519	Mario Enrique Umaña	PLN
Curridabat	60,889	Luz de los Ángeles Retana	CSXXI
Pérez Zeledón	122,187	Rosibel Ramos	PUSC
León Cortés	11,696	Sergio Picado	PUSC
Alajuela	222,853	Fabio Molina	PLN
San Ramón	67,975	Osvaldo Vargas	PUSC
Grecia	65,119	Freddy Barrantes	PUSC
San Mateo	5,343	Erwen Yanan Masís	PUSC
Atenas	22,479	Wilberth Martín Aguilar	PUSC
Naranjo	37,602	Mario Bolívar Solís	PLN
Palmares	29,766	Mario Alberto Rojas	PUSC
Poás	24,764	Carlos Eduardo Soto	PLN
Orotina	15,705	José Joaquín Peraza	PUSC
San Carlos	127,140	Alfredo Córdoba	PLN
Alfaro Ruiz	10,845	Manuel Enrique Durán	PUSC
Valverde Vega	16,239	Víctor Manuel Rojas	PUSC
Upala	37,679	Juan Bosco Acevedo	PLN
Los Chiles	19,732	Santiago Millón	PLN
Guatuso	13,045	Carlos Luis Corrales	PUSC
Cartago	132,057	Harold Humberto Góngora	PUSC
Paraíso	52,393	Marvin Solano	PAPAR
La Unión	80,279	Guillermo Arturo Zúñiga	PIO
Jiménez	14,046	Jorge Humberto Solano	PLN
Turrialba	68,510	Marvin Gerardo Orocú	PUSC
Alvarado	12,290	Ángel Raquel López	PLN
Oreamuno	39,032	Gerardo Walter Granados	PUSC
El Guarco	33,788	Luis Rafael Flores	PUSC
Heredia	103,894	Javier Carvajal	PUSC
Barva	32,440	Omar Enrique Trigueros	PUSC
Santo Domingo	34,748	Erika Lizette Linares	PLN
Santa Bárbara	29,181	Luis Paulino Rodríguez	PUSC
San Rafael	37,293	Jorge Isaac Herrera	PLN
San Isidro	16,056	Elvia Dicciana Villalobos	PLN
Belén	19,834	Víctor Manuel Víquez	PLN
Flores	15,038	Marvin Murillo	PUSC
San Pablo	20,813	Aracelly Salas	PUSC
Sarapiquí	57,147	Pedro Rojas	PLN
Liberia	46,703	Ricardo Adolfo Samper	PLN
Nicoya	42,189	Bernardo Vargas	PLN
Santa Cruz	40,821	Pastor Gómez	PUSC
Bagaces	15,972	Guillermo Aragón	PUSC
Carrillo	27,306	José María Guevara	PUSC
Cañas	24,076	Gilberto Jerez	PLN
Abangares	16,276	Víctor Julio Cabezas	PUSC
Tilarán	17,871	Jovel Arias	PUSC
Nandayure	9,985	Luis Gerardo Rodríguez	PGI
La Cruz	16,505	Junnier Alberto Salazar	PUSC
Hojancha	6,534	Juan Rafael Marín	PLN
Puntarenas	102,504	Omar Obando	PUSC
Esparza	23,963	Dagoberto Venegas	PUSC
Buenos Aires	40,139	Giovanni Fallas	PUSC
Montes de Oro	11,159	Álvaro Jiménez	PLN
Osa	25,861	José Gabriel Villachica	PUSC
Aguirre	20,188	Alex Max Contreras	PUSC
Golfito	33,823	Mauricio Alvarado	PUSC
Coto Brus	40,082	Gerardo Wilson Chaves	PUSC
Parrita	12,112	Ramón Fernando Godínez	PUSC
Corredores	37,274	Augusto César Moya	PUSC
Garabito	10,378	Luis Fernando Villalobos	PUSC
Limón	89,933	Róger Mainor Rivera	PUSC
Pococí	103,121	Manuel Hernández	PUSC
Siquirres	52,409	Miguel Gerardo Quirós	PUSC
Talamanca	25,857	Rugeli Morales	PUSC
Matina	33,096	Rodrigo Gómez	PRC
Guácimo	34,879	Gerardo Fuentes	PLN

Vote percentage
1. PUSC (36.7%)
2. PLN (32.8%)
3. PAC (12.8%)
4. Cantonal parties (5.77%)
5. ML (4.02%)
6. PRC (3.02%)
7. FD (1.29%)
8. PIO (0.95%)
9. C2000 (0.83%)
10. PRESNA (0.68%)
11. PIN (0.61%)
12. Other (0.49%)

Party	Mayors	Popular vote	
Party	Number	Votes	%
Social Christian Unity Party	47	188,612	36,72
National Liberation Party	28	168,410	32,78
Citizens' Action Party	1	65,968	12.84
Total cantonal parties	2	30,273	5.77
Libertarian Movement	0	20,655	4.02
Costa Rican Renewal Party	1	15,497	3.02
Democratic Force	0	6,606	1.29
Independent Workers' Party	1	4,904	0.95
Coalition Change 2000	0	4,272	0.83
National Rescue Party	0	3,488	0.68
National Integration Party	0	3,119	0.61
Independent Guanacaste Party	1	1,259	0.25
Agrarian Labour Action Party	0	569	0.11
Cartago Agrarian Union Party	0	532	0.10
General Union Party	0	96	0.02
Total	81	514,260	100%

By province

Province	PUSC %	PLN %	PAC %	Reg. %	ML %	PRC %	FD %	PIO %	C2000 %	PRESNA %	PIN %
San José Province	29.90	35.12	13.57	12.50	3.66	1.05	1.36	1.46	0.82	0.25	0.31
Alajuela	39.04	38.79	11.46	1.26	2.77	1.30	-	-	1.03	2.74	1.61
Cartago Province	37.35	31.03	14.43	7.75	1.52	-	3.06	4.58	-	-	0.28
Heredia	34.33	34.07	17.65	3.69	3.74	4.08	-	0.35	0.36	-	1.73
Guanacaste	42.84	29.13	11.97	3.41	3.00	7.06	2.07	-	0.36	0.16	-
Puntarenas	46.07	24.96	11.94	3.43	8.63	2.75	1.44	-	0.78	-	-
Limón	36.11	24.68	9.19	4.72	7.40	13.06	2.12	-	2.72	-	-
Total	36.72	32.78	12.84	6.26	4.02	3.02	1.29	0.95	0.83	0.68	0.61
Source: TSE

=== Alderpeople ===
The elections of municipal councilors of Costa Rica in 2002 were an electoral process held in parallel with the presidential and legislative elections. In them the 495 tenure aldermen and the 495 alternates that conform the 81 Municipal Councils were chosen.

The Central Canton of San José, the most populous, named 13 aldermen. Desamparados and Alajuela named 11. Others less populated (Puntarenas, Limón, Pococí, Heredia, Cartago, La Unión, San Carlos, Goicoechea, Pérez Zeledón, etc.) named 9. Others even smaller (Tibás, Grecia, Vázquez de Coronado, Montes de Oca, Siquirres, Escazú, Turrialba, etc.) appointed 7 council members. Finally, the smallest (Turrubares, San Mateo, Santa Ana, Mora, Montes de Oro, Talamanca, etc.) named 5.

Parties	Popular vote			Alderpeople	
Parties	Votes	%	±pp	Total	+/-
Social Christian Unity Party (PUSC)	469,305	30.92	-9.94	180	-91
National Liberation Party (PLN)	443,320	29.21	-6.17	178	-48
Citizens' Action Party (PAC)	310,201	20.44	New	101	New
Libertarian Movement (ML)	84,167	5.55	+3.12	13	+9
Costa Rican Renewal Party (PRC)	54,547	3.59	+1.73	7	+7
Democratic Force (FD)	40,114	2.64	-3.53	4	-20
National Integration Party (PIN)	25,038	1.65	-0.08	1	-2
Coalition Change 2000 (C2000)	17,612	1.16	New	1	New
Agrarian Labour Action Party (PALA)	9,225	0.61	-0.49	2	-5
Escazu's Progressive Yoke (YPE)	7,765	0.51	-0.19	3	-1
National Rescue Party (PRESNA)	7,510	0.49	-0.33	1	New
Independent Workers' Party (PIO)	7,460	0.49	New	1	New
National Agrarian Party (PAN)	5,032	0.33	-0.24	1	-4
Party of the Sun (PdS)	4,880	0.32	+0.06	2	0
Cartago Agrarian Force (FAC)	4,024	0.27	+0.09	0	New
21st Century Curridabat (CSXXI)	3,726	0.25	-0.12	1	-1
Authentic Paraisian Party (PAPAR)	3,264	0.22	New	1	New
National Convergence Party (PCN)	2,927	0.19	-0.10	0	-1
General Union Party (PUG)	2,495	0.16	-0.83	0	-3
Quepeña Action Party (PAQ)	1,956	0.13	New	2	New
Authentic Sarapiquenean Party (PASAR)	1,779	0.12	New	1	New
New Alajuelita Party (PALNU)	1,773	0.12	+0.02	1	0
Humanist Party of Montes de Oca (PH-MdO)	1,212	0.08	-0.06	0	-1
Alliance for San José Party (PASJ)	1,127	0.07	New	0	New
Cantonal Action Independent Siquirres Party (PACSI)	1,079	0.07	New	0	New
Ecological Garabito Party (PEG)	983	0.06	New	2	New
Humanist Party of San José (PH-SJO)	919	0.06	New	0	New
Golfitenean Action Party (PAGOL)	772	0.05	-0.00	0	0
Independent Guanacaste Party (PGI)	759	0.05	-0.14	0	-2
Independent Belemite Party (PIB)	618	0.04	-0.06	0	-1
Limonense Conscience Party (PCL)	617	0.04	New	0	New
Humanist Party of Heredia (PH-Her)	517	0.03	-0.05	0	0
National Patriotic Party (PPN)	485	0.03	New	0	New
New Corredores Party (PUG)	457	0.03	New	0	New
Humanist Party of Barva (PH-Barva)	183	0.01	New	0	New
Total	1,517,848	100.00	-	503	-75
Invalid votes	51,628	3.29			
Votes cast / turnout	1,569,476	68.84			
Abstentions	710,375	31.16			
Registered voters	2,279,851	100%			

=== Syndics and district councils ===
Syndics
PUSC	49.24%
PLN	41.47%
PAC	3.02%
Regionalist	3.02%
ML	0.86%
PRC	0.86%
PIO	0.86%
C2000	0.22%
PIN	0.22%
PRESNA	0.22%

District councillors
PUSC	43.10%
PLN	36.89%
PAC	9.82%
Regionalist	3.67%
PRC	2.59%
ML	1.40%
PIO	0.81%
PRESNA	0.59%
C2000	0.38%
PIN	0.32%

Parties and coalitions	Popular vote		Syndics		District Councillors
Parties and coalitions	Votes	%	Total	+/-	Total
Social Christian Unity Party (PUSC)	184,902	36.85	228	-67	799
National Liberation Party (PLN)	169,660	33.81	192	+47	684
Citizens' Action Party (PAC)	63,270	12.61	14	New	182
Libertarian Movement (ML)	16,367	3.26	4	+4	26
Costa Rican Renewal Party (PRC)	15,665	3.21	4	+4	48
Democratic Force (FD)	6,539	1.30	0	0	8
Coalition Change 2000 (C2000)	4,797	0.96	1	New	7
Independent Workers' Party (PIO)	4,444	0.89	4	New	15
Alliance to Advance Party (PAPA)	4,421	0.88	0	New	5
Alliance for San José Party (PASJ)	4,037	0.80	0	New	3
Authentic Paraisian Party (PAPAR)	3,586	0.71	2	New	6
National Integration Party (PIN)	3,189	0.64	1	+1	6
Escazu's Progressive Yoke (YPE)	2,670	0.53	1	-2	4
National Rescue Party (PRESNA)	2,354	0.47	1	+1	11
Party of the Sun (PdS)	1,844	0.37	2	0	8
Cantonal Action Independent Siquirres Party (PACSI)	1,652	0.33	2	New	7
We Are All San José Party (SJST)	1,651	0.33	0	New	1
21st Century Curridabat (CSXXI)	1,412	0.28	2	+1	4
Independent Guanacaste Party (PGI)	1,181	0.24	2	+2	9
Authentic Sarapiquenean Party (PASAR)	978	0.19	2	New	9
Quepeña Action Party (PAQ)	941	0.19	0	New	3
Change Now (CYA)	833	0.17	0	New	0
Ecological Garabito Party (PEG)	819	0.16	1	New	3
Authentic Cantonal Option Movement (MOCA)	692	0.14	0	New	0
Curridabat Movement (MCur)	642	0.13	0	New	1
Agrarian Labour Action Party (PALA)	544	0.11	0	-2	3
Independent Belemite Party (PIB)	532	0.11	0	0	1
Cartago Agrarian Union Party (PUAC)	503	0.10	0	0	0
Santacrucean Rebirth Party (PRS)	490	0.10	0	New	0
Humanist Party of Montes de Oca (PH-MdO)	394	0.08	0	0	1
New Corredores Party (PUG)	288	0.06	0	New	1
Limonense Conscience Party (PCL)	256	0.05	0	New	0
Humanist Party of Heredia (PH-Her)	125	0.02	0	0	0
General Union Party (PUGEN)	62	0.01	0	0	0
Total	500,080	100.00	463	+16	1854
Invalid votes	20,803	3.98			
Votes cast / turnout	520,883	22.64			
Abstentions	1,785,510	77.36			
Registered voters	2,306,393				

== See also ==
- Local government in Costa Rica
- List of mayors in Costa Rica
