= Marta Eugenia Solano Arias =

Costa Rican lawyer and political scientist

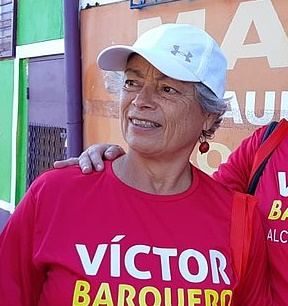
Solano during the 2020 Costa Rican municipal elections

Marta Eugenia Solano Arias is a Costa Rican politician, lawyer and political scientist. Solano holds a bachelor's degree in political science from the University of Costa Rica and a law degree from the same college, she also holds a master's degree in women's studies and is specialist in agrarian law. She's currently president of the ruling Citizens' Action Party.

Solano was member of the party's National Assembly, and the party's local assembly in the Montes de Oca canton, National Coordinator of the Women's Commission, member of the National Political Commission and twice participant in the two ideological congresses of the party. She has worked for the Institute for Rural Development of Costa Rica, as college professor in the National University of Costa Rica, anti-sexual harassment prosecutor in the National University, advisor for the congresswomen Marlene Madrigal Flores and Epsy Campbell Barr and advisor to MIDEPOR. She was also candidate for congress for the fifth place in San Jose's list in 2018.
