= National Route 211 (Costa Rica) =

National Road Route in Costa Rica

National Secondary Route 211
- Ruta nacional secundaria 211

Route information
- Maintained by Ministry of Public Works and Transport
- Length: 3.060 km (1.901 mi)

Location
- Country: Costa Rica
- Provinces: San José

Highway system
- National Road Network of Costa Rica
← Route 210	→ Route 212

National Secondary Route 211, or just Route 211 (Spanish: Ruta Nacional Secundaria 211, or Ruta 211) is a National Road Route of Costa Rica, located in the San José province.

== Description ==
In San José province the route covers San José canton (San Francisco de Dos Ríos district) and Curridabat canton (Curridabat and Tirrases districts).
