= Tirrases =

District in San José, Costa Rica

- District
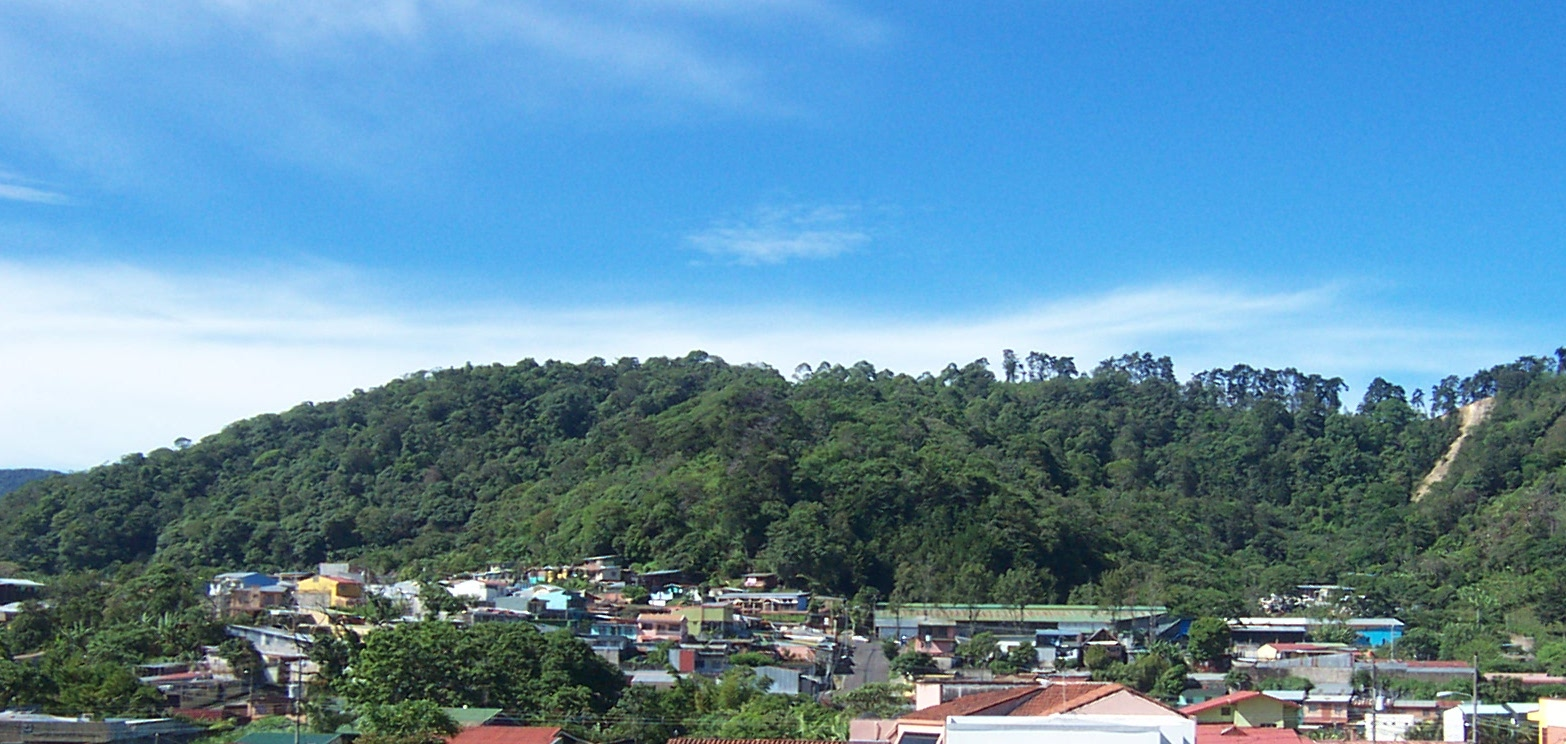
- Tirrases, seen from Hacienda Vieja
- Nickname: Tirra
- Tirrases district
- Tirrases district location in Costa Rica
- Coordinates: 9.9015151°N 84.0340513°W
- Country: Costa Rica
- Province: San José
- Canton: Curridabat
- Creation: 21 August 1929

Government
  - Syndic: Julio Omar Quirós Porras (Curridabat Siglo XXI)
  - Substitute syndic: Dunia Montes Álvarez

Area
  - Total: 1.87 km^{2} (0.72 sq mi)
- Elevation: 1,175 m (3,855 ft)

Population (2011)
  - Total: 16,247
  - Density: 8,690/km^{2} (22,500/sq mi)
- Demonym: Tirraseño
- Time zone: UTC−06:00
- Postal code: 11804

Tirrases is a district of the Curridabat canton, in the San José province of Costa Rica.

== Toponymy ==
The district takes its name of the Tirrá tree (Ulmus mexicana).

== History ==
The Curridabat canton was founded on 21 August 1929, as the 18th province of San José. With the creation of the canton also was created the district.

== Geography ==
Tirrases has an area of 1.87 km^{2} and an elevation of 1,175 metres.

== Demographics ==
Historical population
Census	Pop.	±% p.a.
1950	293	—
1963	595	+5.60%
1973	1,453	+9.34%
1984	5,775	+13.37%
2000	15,826	+6.50%
2011	16,247	+0.24%
2022	16,151	−0.05%
Source: Instituto Nacional de Estadística y Censos; Centro Centroamericano de Población

For the 2011 census, Tirrases had a population of 16,247 inhabitants.

== Transportation ==
=== Road transportation ===
The district is covered by the following road routes:

- National Route 210
- National Route 211

== Education ==
6.98% of the population doesn't have any education. The district has two public schools: the Escuela Centroamérica and Escuela 15 de Agosto. Tirrases also has a public high school called Colegio Técnico Profesional Uladislao Gámez Solano (Fund 2006). This high school is located at the Catholic Church of Las Mercedes and had a population of 60 students in 2007.

== Health ==
The health services are provided by the EBAIS (Equipo Básico de Atención Integral en Salud) located at Hacienda Vieja, 200 north and 25 east from the Liceo de Curridabat.

== Security ==
As per the official statements domestic violence is the most common security issue, but non-official data shows that drugs and gang warfare are the main problems in this zone.

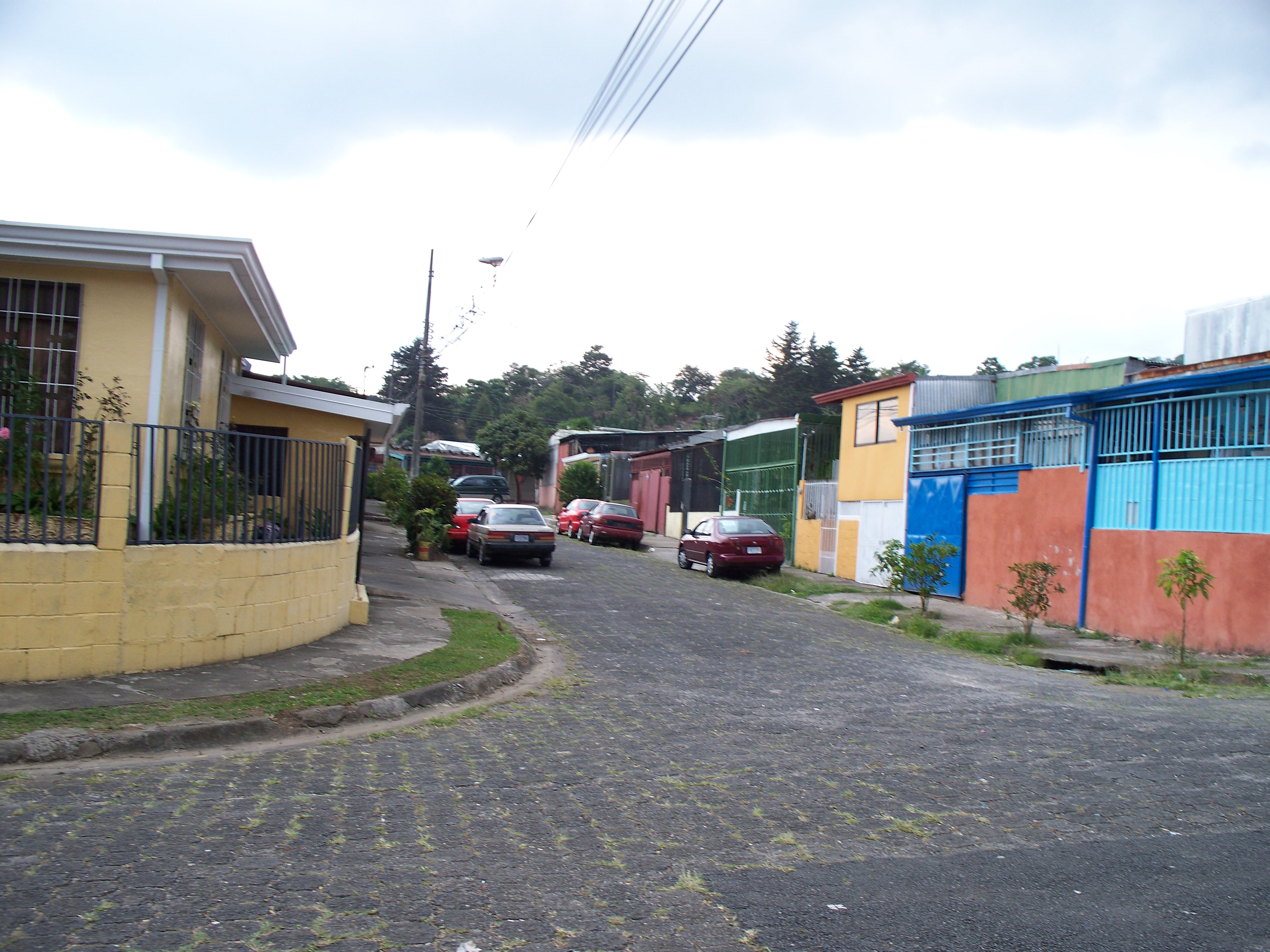
One of the various neighborhoods in Tirrases
