= Granadilla District =

District in Curridabat canton, San José province, Costa Rica

Granadilla
- District
- Interactive map of Granadilla
- Granadilla district location in Costa Rica
- Coordinates: 9.9309202°N 84.023276°W
- Country: Costa Rica
- Province: San José
- Canton: Curridabat

Area
  - Total: 3.52 km^{2} (1.36 sq mi)
- Elevation: 1,343 m (4,406 ft)

Population (2011)
  - Total: 14,778
  - Density: 4,200/km^{2} (10,900/sq mi)
- Time zone: UTC−06:00
- Postal code: 11802

Granadilla is a district of the Curridabat canton, in the San José province of Costa Rica.

== Geography ==
Granadilla has an area of 3.52 km^{2} and an elevation of 1,343 metres.

== Demographics ==
Historical population
Census	Pop.	±% p.a.
1950	1,155	—
1963	2,316	+5.50%
1973	3,685	+4.75%
1984	4,940	+2.70%
2000	11,600	+5.48%
2011	14,778	+2.23%
2022	17,359	+1.47%
Source: Instituto Nacional de Estadística y Censos; Centro Centroamericano de Población

For the 2011 census, Granadilla had a population of 14,778 inhabitants.

== Transportation ==
=== Road transportation ===
The district is covered by the following road routes:

- National Route 221
- National Route 306

=== Rail transportation ===
The Interurbano Line operated by Incofer goes through this district.
