= National Route 210 (Costa Rica) =

National Road Route in Costa Rica

National Secondary Route 210
- Ruta nacional secundaria 210

Route information
- Maintained by Ministry of Public Works and Transport
- Length: 4.000 km (2.485 mi)

Location
- Country: Costa Rica
- Provinces: San José

Highway system
- National Road Network of Costa Rica
← Route 209	→ Route 211

National Secondary Route 210, or just Route 210 (Spanish: Ruta Nacional Secundaria 210, or Ruta 210) is a National Road Route of Costa Rica, located in the San José province.

== Description ==
In San José province the route covers Desamparados canton (San Antonio district) and Curridabat canton (Curridabat and Tirrases districts).
