= 21st Century Curridabat =

Local political party in Costa Rica

21st Century Curridabat Curridabat Siglo XXI
- President: Guillermo Alonso Guzmán
- Founded: 1997
- Headquarters: Granadilla Curridabat, via 306 San José
- Ideology: Progressivism; Localism
- National affiliation: Citizens' Action Party

Party flag

21st Century Curridabat (Spanish: Curridabat Siglo XXI) is a local political party in Curridabat Canton, Costa Rica. It is considered the most successful local party in the country as all Curridabat mayors have come from the party. The party also often controls the majority of the Municipal Council.

Curridabat first mayor elected in 2002 at the first Costa Rican mayoral elections was Lucy Retana. Retana did not run for re-election and was succeeded by Edgar Mora, the party's nominee for the 2006 election. Mora won re-election in all later elections. After the 2016 municipal election, the party won all the District's Syndics and thewe out of seven members of the Municipal Council.
