= Curridabat (canton) =

Canton in San José province, Costa Rica

- Canton
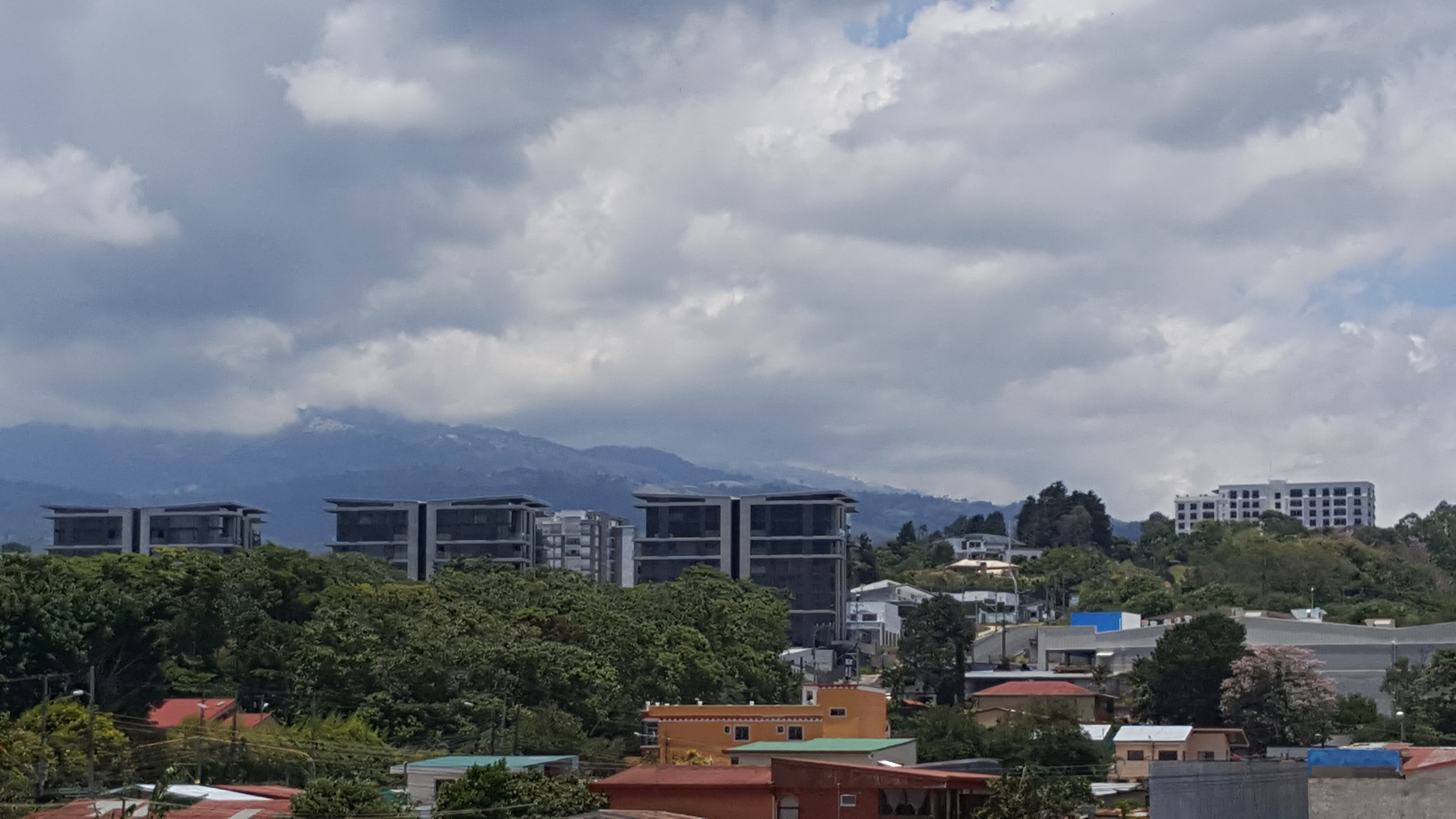
- Mountains seen from Curridabat.

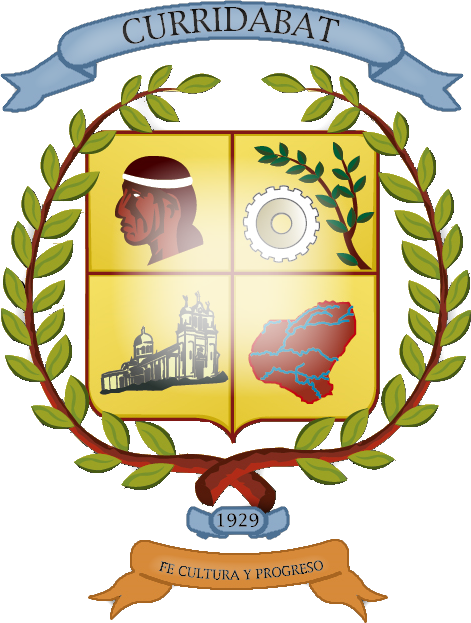
- Flag Seal
- Nickname: Curri
- Interactive map of Curridabat
- Curridabat canton location in San José Province Curridabat canton location in Costa Rica
- Coordinates: 9.9163367°N 84.0282798°W
- Country: Costa Rica
- Province: San José
- Creation: 21 August 1929
- Head city: Curridabat
- Districts: Districts: Curridabat; Granadilla; Sánchez; Tirrases

Government
  - Type: Municipality
  - Body: Municipalidad de Curridabat
  - Mayor: Errol Andrés Solano Bolaños (CSXXI)

Area
  - Total: 16.06 km^{2} (6.20 sq mi)
- Elevation: 1,244 m (4,081 ft)

Population (2011)
  - Total: 65,206
  - Estimate (2022): 71,026
  - Density: 4,060/km^{2} (10,520/sq mi)
- Time zone: UTC−06:00
- Canton code: 118
- Website: www.curridabat.go.cr

Curridabat is the eighteenth canton in the San José province of Costa Rica. The head city the homonymous Curridabat. The canton forms a suburb of the national capital of San José, lying on the southeast edge of the city.

== History ==
Curridabat was created on 21 August 1929 by decree 209.

== Government ==
In 1930, the canton had a municipality with three regidores, a mayor (Ejecutivo Municipal) and a political chief (Jefe Político; both charges were held by same person). At this time, the canton's population was of 5,000 people. As the population grew, the municipality had to create a sanitation department to collect garbage, provide public road maintenance, and build infrastructure. The municipality Council was later expanded to five members by popular election in 1970.

=== Mayor ===
According to Costa Rica's Municipal Code, mayors are elected every four years by the population of the canton. As of the latest municipal elections in 2024, the 21st Century Curridabat (CSXXI) candidate, Errol Andrés Solano Bolaños, was elected mayor of the canton with 24.52% of the votes, with Paula Rebeca Camacho Solís and Melissa Berenzon Quirós as first and second vice mayors, respectively.

Mayors of Curridabat since the 2002 elections
Period	Name	Party
2002–2006	Luz de los Ángeles Retana Chinchilla (Note: Also legally named Lucy Retana Chinchilla.)	CSXXI
2006–2010	Edgar Eduardo Mora Altamirano	CSXXI
2010–2016	Edgar Eduardo Mora Altamirano	CSXXI
2016–2020	Edgar Eduardo Mora Altamirano	CSXXI
2020–2024	Jimmy Cruz Jiménez	CSXXI
2024–2028	Errol Andrés Solano Bolaños	CSXXI

=== Municipal Council ===
Like the mayor and vice mayors, members of the Municipal Council (called regidores) are elected every four years. Curridabat's Municipal Council has 7 seats for regidores and their substitutes, who can participate in meetings but not vote unless the owning regidor (regidor propietario) is absent. The current president of the Municipal Council is Pro-Curri People Party member Luis Ulderico Monge Díaz, with Social Christian Unity Party member Andrea Vargas Uribe as vice president. The Municipal Council's composition for the 2024–2028 period is as follows:

Composition of the Municipal Council of Curridabat after the 2024 municipal elections
Political party	Regidores			Diagram
Political party	№	Owner	Substitute	Diagram
21st Century Curridabat (CSXXI)	2	Ingrid Molina Huezo	Mariana Román Solano	
21st Century Curridabat (CSXXI)	2	Oscar Arturo Mora Almariano	Roger Alfredo Díaz Aguilar	
National Liberation Party (PLN)	1	Bolívar Gerardo Jiménez Rodríguez	Oscar Rojas Ramos	
National Democratic Agenda (ADN)	1	Alberto Gerardo Fernandez Aguilar	Julio Omar Quirós Porras	
Pro-Curri People Party (PGPC)	1	Luis Ulderico Monge Díaz^{(P)}	Alexis Gerardo Lopez Villalta	
Social Christian Unity Party (PUSC)	1	Andrea Vargas Uribe^{(VP)}	Tatiana Rivera Bonilla	
Social Democratic Progress Party (PSD)	1	Cindy María Hernández Cordero	Jessica Solano Fernandez	

== Geography ==
Curridabat has an area of 16.06 km^{2} (6.20 sq mi).

== Points of interest ==
- Plaza del Sol (Sun's Plaza) a shopping center built between 1982 and 1983. At the time it was the most modern shopping center in the city. Today, it has many customers ranging from middle to high class.
- Multiplaza del Este (Eastern Multiplaza), now Multiplaza Curridabat, is a mall built between August 2002 and October 2003 that belongs to the commercial chain of the same name and have other malls in Central America. It has a food court, cinemas and stores. It is located in the old establishment of Republic Tobacco Co. The mall was expanded twice in 2007 and between 2013 and 2014.
- San José Indoor Club, it is a recreational sports club for the middle and high class in San José. It was opened during the mid-1970s.

== Districts ==
The canton of Curridabat is subdivided into the following districts:

1. Curridabat
2. Granadilla
3. Sánchez
4. Tirrases

== Demographics ==
Historical population
Census	Pop.	±% p.a.
1950	4,497	—
1963	9,491	+5.91%
1973	15,591	+5.09%
1984	31,954	+6.74%
2000	60,889	+4.11%
2011	65,206	+0.62%
2022	71,026	+0.78%
Source: Instituto Nacional de Estadística y Censos; Centro Centroamericano de Población

Curridabat had an estimated 71,026 inhabitants in 2022, up from 65,206 at the time of the 2011 census.

In 2022, Curridabat had a Human Development Index of 0.835, the sixth highest nationwide.

== Notable residents ==
- Rafael Ángel Calderón Fournier, former president, lives in Pinares; also son of former president Rafael Ángel Calderón Guardia
- Karen Olsen Beck, wife of former president José Figueres Ferrer; also mother of former president José Figueres Olsen

== Transportation ==
=== Road transportation ===
The canton is covered by the following road routes:

- National Route 2
- National Route 210
- National Route 211
- National Route 215
- National Route 221
- National Route 251
- National Route 252
- National Route 306

=== Rail transportation ===
The Interurbano Line operated by Incofer goes through this canton.
