= Curridabat =

District in Curridabat canton, San José province, Costa Rica

- District
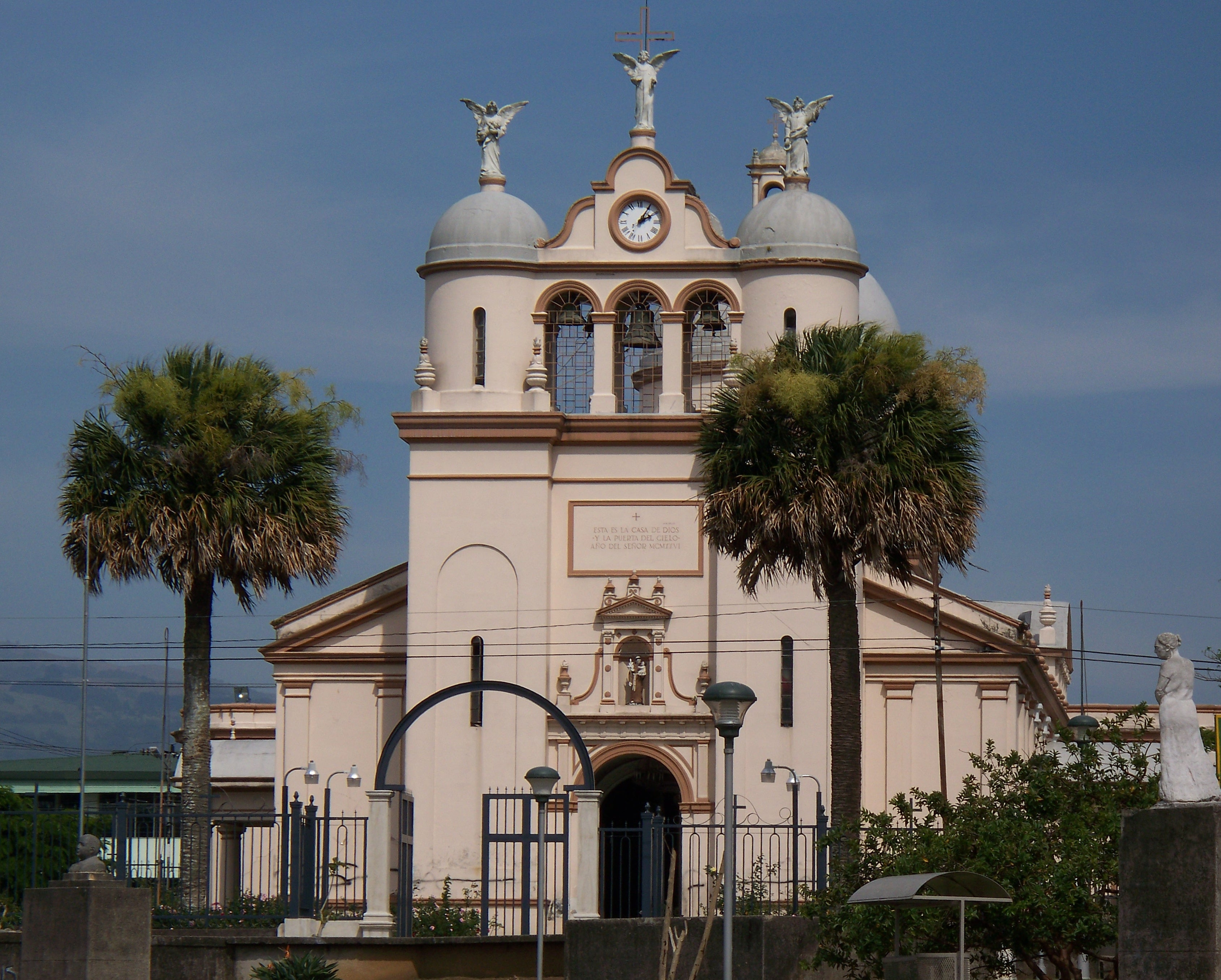
- Parroquia San Antonio de Padua Catholic church in downtown Curridabat
- Interactive map of Curridabat
- Curridabat district location in Costa Rica
- Coordinates: 9.9160278°N 84.0347619°W
- Country: Costa Rica
- Province: San José
- Canton: Curridabat

Area
  - Total: 6.16 km^{2} (2.38 sq mi)
- Elevation: 1,208 m (3,963 ft)

Population (2011)
  - Total: 28,817
  - Density: 4,680/km^{2} (12,100/sq mi)
- Time zone: UTC−06:00
- Postal code: 11801

Curridabat is a district of the Curridabat canton, in the San José province of Costa Rica.

== Geography ==
Curridabat has an area of 6.16 km^{2} and an elevation of 1,208 metres.

It is situated on the eastern border of the San José capital city, north of Desamparados Canton, and south of Montes de Oca Canton.

== Demographics ==
Historical population
Census	Pop.	±% p.a.
1864	1,026	—
1883	1,227	+0.95%
1892	1,930	+5.16%
1927	2,551	+0.80%
1950	2,485	−0.11%
1963	5,764	+6.69%
1973	9,581	+5.21%
1984	19,821	+6.83%
2000	30,316	+2.69%
2011	28,817	−0.46%
2022	30,574	+0.54%
Source: Instituto Nacional de Estadística y Censos; Centro Centroamericano de Población

For the 2011 census, Curridabat had a population of 28,817 inhabitants.

== Transportation ==
=== Road transportation ===
The district is covered by the following road routes:

- National Route 2
- National Route 210
- National Route 211
- National Route 215
- National Route 221
- National Route 251
- National Route 252

=== Rail transportation ===
The Interurbano Line operated by Incofer goes through this district.
