= List of universities in Costa Rica =

Costa Rica has both public and private universities, such as the University of Costa Rica and the University for Peace.

Public universities are some of the largest academic institutions in Costa Rica. There are four public universities in the country, each assigned to emphasize certain academic disciplines. A fifth university, Technical National University (UTN) was recently established in the city of Alajuela. All public universities are members of the Consensus Nacional de Rectores (CONARE, National University Presidents' Council).

== Public universities in Costa Rica ==
- Distance State University (UNED) is focused on distance learning. Its main offices are in Sabanilla district, Montes de Oca canton, and it has many local branch campuses for classes and exams.
- National Technical University (UTN) in Alajuela.
- National University of Costa Rica (UNA) is located in Heredia and has a strong department of life sciences. About 30,000 students attend UNA.
- Costa Rica Institute of Technology (TEC) has its main campus in Dulce Nombre district of Cartago canton, is modeled as an institute of technology.
- University of Costa Rica (UCR) its main campus is in San Pedro district, Montes de Oca canton. It is the oldest, largest, and most prestigious institution of higher learning in Costa Rica. Its origins can be traced back to 1832. Approximately 40,000 students are enrolled at UCR. It is a research institution with more than 25 research units.

== Private universities ==
- Invenio is a campus-based science and technology university, using the Dual Education model from the Baden-Württemberg Cooperative State University (Germany). Invenio Campus GML is on the road to Los Ángeles, Tilarán, in Cañas, Guanacaste.
- UAM (Universidad Americana): Universidad Americana's main campus is in Los Yoses, Montes de Oca, where the Goethe Institute used to be. It was created in 1997 and officially started simultaneously in San José and Cartago in 1998. A few months later, another campus opened in Heredia.
- ULACIT (Universidad Latinoamericana de Ciencia y Tecnología): ULACIT is a private, bilingual institution located in San José, Costa Rica offering programs in both Spanish and English. Established in 1987, ULACIT has positioned itself as a leader in higher education within the Central American region, emphasizing innovation, entrepreneurship, and a global perspective.
- Universidad CENFOTEC is a specialized university focusing on ICT-related careers. It was founded in 2000 by a group of software development exporting companies to train highly specialized and rapidly operational technicians in software development to meet the increasing demand of this type of professionals. Founded as a Technical Training Center focused solely on software development, it has evolved and was awarded university status in 2011 by CONESUP. Nowadays it includes careers in telecommunications, software development, development for the Web, and ICT infrastructure. Its campus is in Montes de Oca, San José. It is only a teaching institution.
- UCIMED (Universidad de Ciencias Médicas) is a medical school in San José. UCIMED was founded in 1978 and is solely dedicated to the teaching of medicine.
- Universidad Cristiana del Sur is in San José.
- Texas Tech University - Costa Rica is in San Rafael District, Escazú.
- Universidad EARTH is in Pocora, Limón. It specializes in agriculture and the environment. It enrols approximately 400-500 students. It attracts a whole range of nationalities including American and British interns who often study at the university for a semester to a year.
- Universidad Empresarial de Costa Rica (UNEM): The Business University of Costa Rica is a private university. UNEM is an institution of higher learning in Costa Rica. This university is listed in the UNESCO International Association of Universities Directory of Higher Education. UNEM is authorized by the Asesoría Legal del Ministerio de Educación No. ATJ-167-CONESUP to operate internationally, to offer international programs, and to grant bachelor's, master's and doctorate degrees with agreements with foreign universities. Even though it offers graduate programs, this institution is only a teaching university with no research function.
- Universidad Hispanoamericana is a private university based in San José with campuses in several other cities including Cartago and Heredia. Like other private universities it is only a teaching university, with no research conducted at the institution.
- Universidad de La Salle (ULaSalle) is a private Catholic university in Costa Rica. The university is accredited by Consejo Nacional de Enseñanza Superior Universitaria Privada and recognized by the Ministry of Education. ULaSalle has four faculties in Administration, Law, Education and Psychology, offers programs to grant bachelor's, master's and doctorate degrees, as well as Chairs of Human Rights, Bioethics and St. John Baptist de La Salle, Research and Extension Programs.
- Universidad Latina (ULatina) is a private university in Costa Rica. The university has several campuses around Costa Rica, although the main campus is in San Pedro, San José. Like most, if not all, private universities in Costa Rica it has remained solely as a teaching university. It does not have an admission exam and even admits students who have not passed the "Bachillerato" exams (education exams high school students must pass to graduate).
- Universidad San Juan de la Cruz (SJDLC) is a private university in Costa Rica. The university is accredited by Consejo Nacional de Enseñanza Superior Universitaria Privada and recognized by the Ministry of Education. SLDLC offers courses in criminal justice, business, law, accounting and technology through campus and distance learning programs.
- The University for Peace was created in 1980 by the United Nations. It has eight master's programs related to conflict resolution and peace building. Its main campus is in Ciudad Colón, Costa Rica, about 40 minutes outside of San José.
