= Tres Ríos, Cartago =

District in Cartago, Costa Rica

Tres Ríos
- District
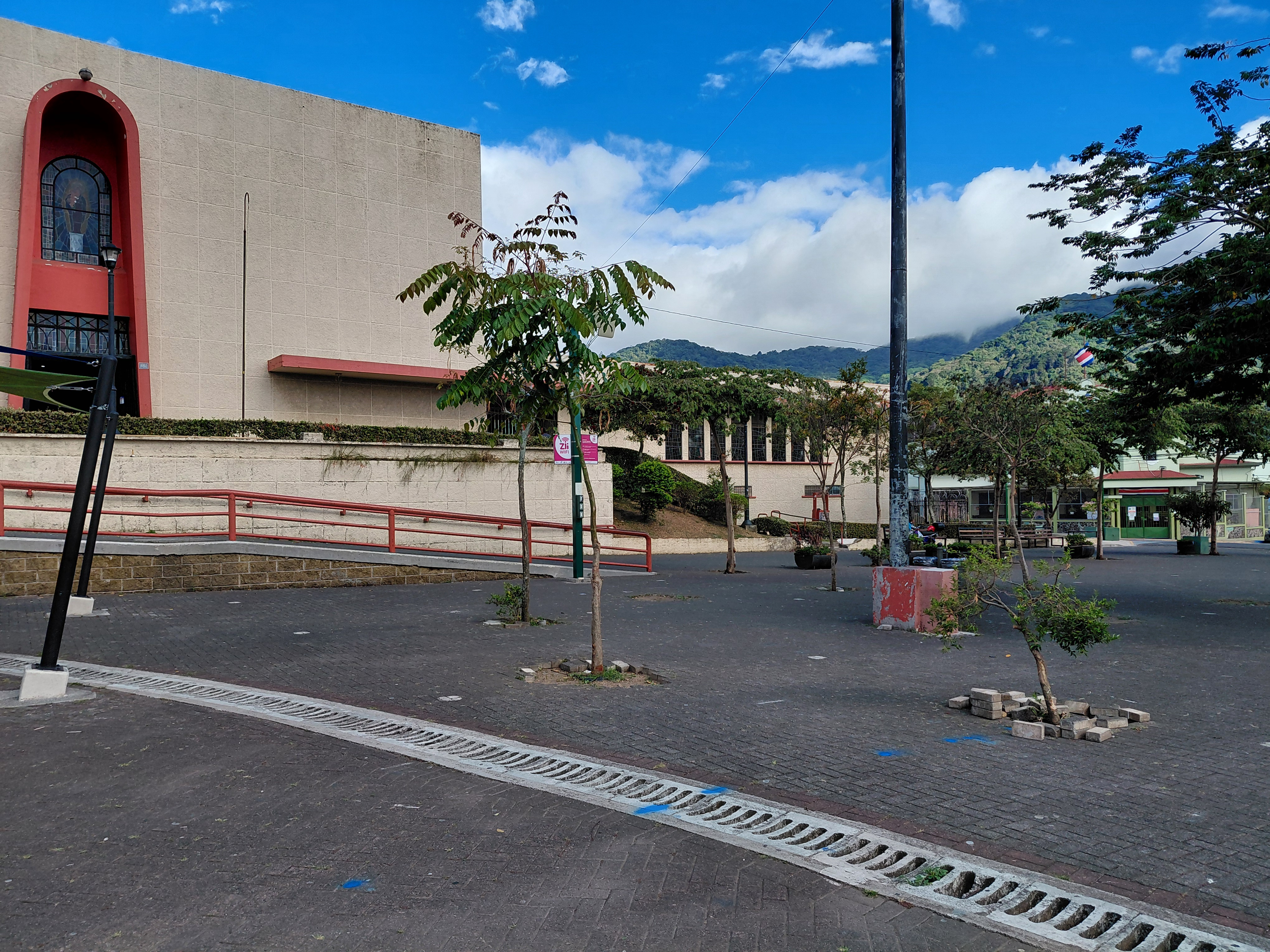
- Tres Ríos church and park
- Tres Ríos district
- Tres Ríos district location in Costa Rica
- Coordinates: 9.907172°N 83.9864611°W
- Country: Costa Rica
- Province: Cartago
- Canton: La Unión

Area
  - Total: 2.19 km^{2} (0.85 sq mi)
- Elevation: 1,345 m (4,413 ft)

Population (2011)
  - Total: 9,331
  - Density: 4,260/km^{2} (11,000/sq mi)
- Time zone: UTC−06:00
- Postal code: 30301

Tres Ríos (lit. 'Three Rivers') is a district of the La Unión canton, in the Cartago province of Costa Rica. Its name is derived from its location at the confluence of the Tiribí, Chiquito and Cruz rivers.

According to the 2011 census, Tres Ríos had a population of 9,331 inhabitants. The district has an area of 2.19 km^{2} and an elevation of 1,345 metres.

== History ==
During the pre-Columbian era, the region of La Unión was part of the Eastern Huetar Kingdom and was inhabited by the Huetar people. At the time of the arrival of Spanish conquistadores, the region's chief was Correque.

Significant colonial settlement of the region did not take place until the 18th century when priests from the Church of the Holy Spirit of Esparza settled in the area. The priests had been traveling with indigenous peoples from the Salamanca region towards Cartago and stopped in what was then known as the Valley of Three Rivers (Spanish: Valle de los Tres Ríos). The priests built a small chapel which they dedicated to the Our Lady of the Pillar, whose image had been given to them by Bishop Heredia. Their presence in the area attracted permanent settlement and a stable population, and the fledgling town became known as Nuestra Señora del Pilar de los Tres Ríos (English: Our Lady of the Pillar of the Three Rivers).

== Infrastructure ==
=== Education ===
Tres Ríos has one school, the Escuela Central de Tres Ríos.

Historical population
Census	Pop.	±% p.a.
1883	852	—
1892	1,077	+2.64%
1927	1,540	+1.03%
1950	2,837	+2.69%
1963	4,694	+3.95%
1973	6,804	+3.78%
1984	8,661	+2.22%
2000	10,009	+0.91%
2011	9,331	−0.64%
2022	7,480	−1.99%
Source: Instituto Nacional de Estadística y Censos; Centro Centroamericano de Población

=== Road transportation ===
The district is covered by the following road routes:

- National Route 2
- National Route 202
- National Route 221
- National Route 251
- National Route 409

=== Rail transportation ===
The district is covered by the passenger Interurbano Line operated by Incofer. There is an unstaffed platform stop in the north of the district at Plaza Barcelona shopping center.

== Economy ==
The agricultural area surrounding Tres Ríos is one of the eight recognized coffee production areas in the country. The regional coffee flavor is associated with high fertility soil that is enriched by minerals from eruptions of the Irazú Volcano. The volcano last erupted in 1963. This flavor is balanced by moisture from the rain and warm summers.

Due to dynamic urban growth in the metropolitan area of Costa Rica in the late twentieth century, land use has progressively changed from agricultural to suburban development. The expansion of urban areas has force the closure of dozens of coffee farms. However, regions within La Unión, including Tres Ríos, Concepción and San Ramón, continue to grow coffee beans for the gourmet market.

The economy of Tres Ríos has become increasingly diversified and is no longer solely dependent on coffee production. Because of the region's location between the cities of San José and Cortago, the economy has become linked to their outward development and now caters to trade and development. Urban development has also led to the foundation of several private schools.
