= Heredia railway station =

Railway station in Costa Rica

Heredia railway station Estación de Heredia
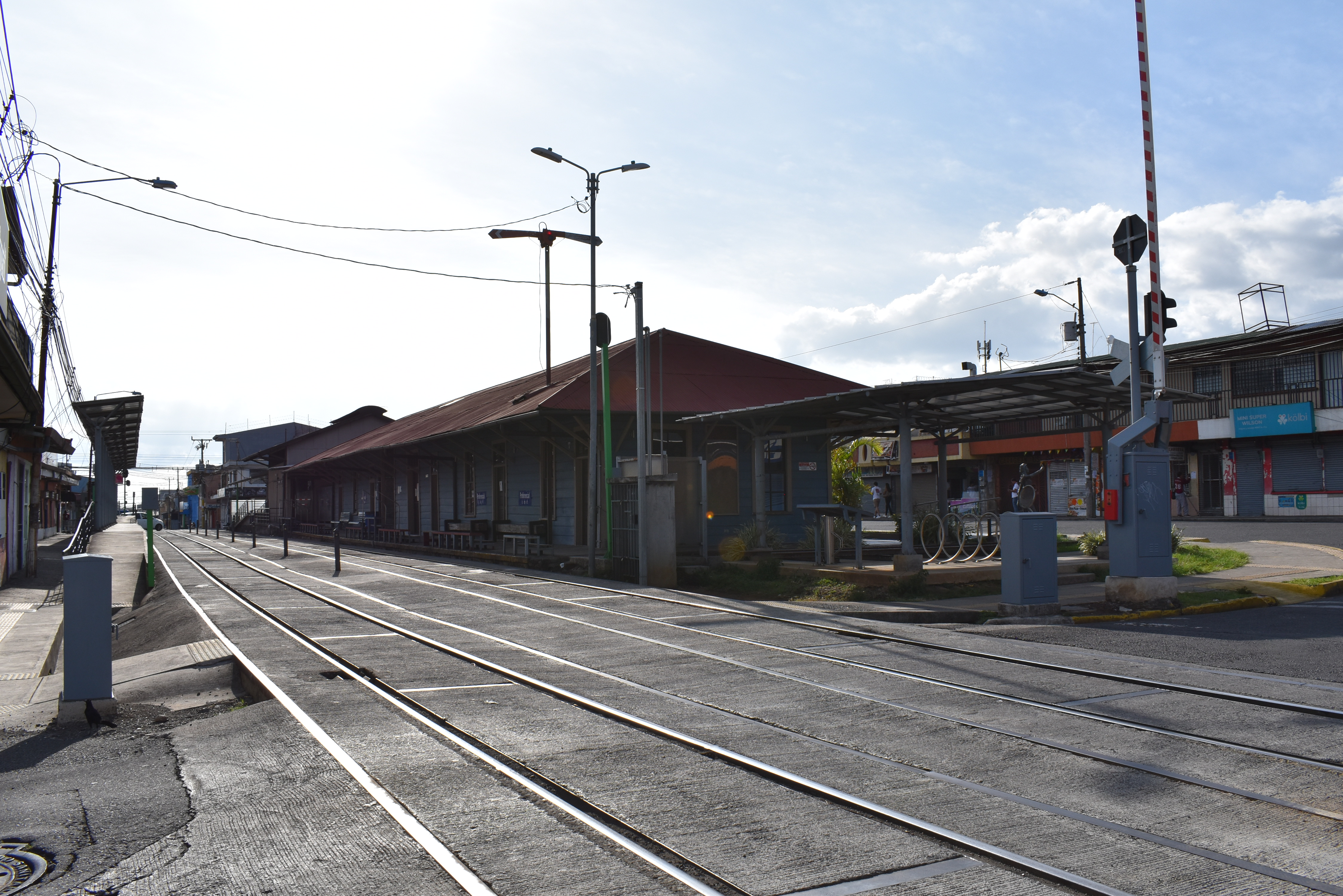
- The station in May 2023

General information
- Location: Calle Ruben Darío (Calle 2) and Calle Franklin D. Roosevelt (Calle Central), Avenida 8A; Heredia district, Heredia canton, Heredia province Costa Rica
- Coordinates: 9.99478°N 84.11712°W
- Operator: Incofer
- Line: Interurbano
- Platforms: 1

Construction
- Structure type: Bahareque and wood.

History
- Opened: 1870s
Location

Heredia railway station is a staffed train station, managed by Incofer, located in the Heredia province of Costa Rica.

== Station layout ==
Two tracks at ground level with platforms on both sides.

== History ==
The station building was built in the 1870s with es:bahareque and structurally improved in 1905 by adding wood panels, it was used for freight and passenger transportation, and fell to disrepair in the middle of the 20th century. In 1992 the passenger service from the station towards San José was reestablished, which then in 1995 was stopped due to the closure of Incofer, and reopened for service again in 2009.

The station received a major restoration effort between 2018 and 2019, financed by the local government, the Heredia municipality, at a cost of CRC ₡348 million, and designed by architects from the Costa Rica Institute of Technology. The station was reopened on July 5, 2019.

It is an historical patrimony building of Costa Rica since 2003.

== Around the station ==
To the north of the station is the Mercado Florense, and nearby is the Mercado Municipal de Heredia.

== Adjacent stations ==
Bus stops towards other areas of Heredia province.

== See also ==
- Atlántico railway station
- Rail transport in Costa Rica
- Interurbano Line
