= San Rafael District, La Unión =

District in La Unión canton, Cartago province, Costa Rica

San Rafael
- District
- San Rafael district
- San Rafael district location in Costa Rica
- Coordinates: 9.9035934°N 83.9698058°W
- Country: Costa Rica
- Province: Cartago
- Canton: La Unión

Area
  - Total: 9.46 km^{2} (3.65 sq mi)
- Elevation: 1,340 m (4,400 ft)

Population (2011)
  - Total: 14,247
  - Density: 1,510/km^{2} (3,900/sq mi)
- Time zone: UTC−06:00
- Postal code: 30304

San Rafael is a district of the La Unión canton, in the Cartago province of Costa Rica.

== Geography ==
San Rafael has an area of 9.46 km² and an elevation of 1,340 metres.

== Demographics ==
Historical population
Census	Pop.	±% p.a.
1883	476	—
1892	661	+3.72%
1927	648	−0.06%
1950	812	+0.99%
1963	1,775	+6.20%
1973	2,703	+4.30%
1984	5,064	+5.87%
2000	10,961	+4.94%
2011	14,247	+2.41%
2022	14,201	−0.03%
Source: Instituto Nacional de Estadística y Censos; Centro Centroamericano de Población

For the 2011 census, San Rafael had a population of 14,247 inhabitants.

== Transportation ==
=== Road transportation ===
The district is covered by the following road routes:

- National Route 2
- National Route 251

=== Rail transportation ===
The Interurbano Line operated by Incofer goes through this district.
