= San Ramón District =

San Ramón District may refer to:

- Peru
  - San Ramón District, Chanchamayo, in Chanchamayo province
- Costa Rica
  - San Ramón District, La Unión, in La Unión Canton, Cartago province
  - San Ramón District, San Ramón, in San Ramón (canton), Alajuela province
