= San Juan District, La Unión =

District in La Unión canton, Cartago province, Costa Rica

San Juan
- District
- San Juan district
- San Juan district location in Costa Rica
- Coordinates: 9.9103018°N 84.0069046°W
- Country: Costa Rica
- Province: Cartago
- Canton: La Unión

Area
  - Total: 3.94 km^{2} (1.52 sq mi)
- Elevation: 1,260 m (4,130 ft)

Population (2011)
  - Total: 13,729
  - Density: 3,480/km^{2} (9,020/sq mi)
- Time zone: UTC−06:00
- Postal code: 30303

San Juan is a district of the La Unión canton, in the Cartago province of Costa Rica.

== Geography ==
San Juan has an area of 3.94 km² and an elevation of 1,260 metres.

== Demographics ==
Historical population
Census	Pop.	±% p.a.
1883	255	—
1892	481	+7.31%
1927	514	+0.19%
1950	661	+1.10%
1963	971	+3.00%
1973	1,490	+4.38%
1984	1,941	+2.43%
2000	8,139	+9.37%
2011	13,729	+4.87%
2022	13,956	+0.15%
Source: Instituto Nacional de Estadística y Censos; Centro Centroamericano de Población

For the 2011 census, San Juan had a population of 13,729 inhabitants.

== Transportation ==
=== Road transportation ===
The district is covered by the following road routes:

- National Route 2
- National Route 251

=== Rail transportation ===
The Interurbano Line operated by Incofer goes through this district.
