= Belén railway station =

Railway station in Costa Rica

Belén railway station Estación de Belén
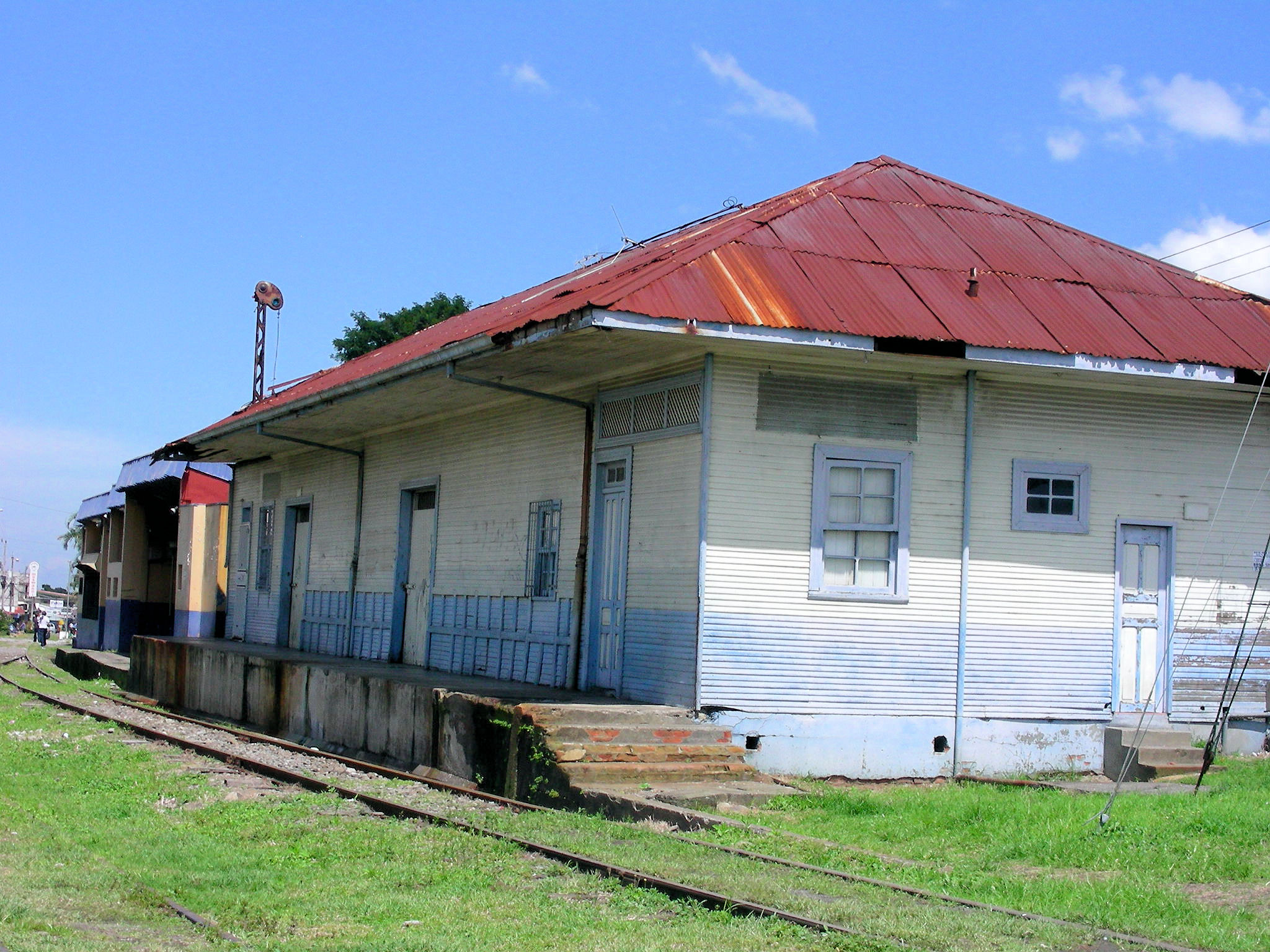
- Belén station before restoration efforts.

General information
- Location: Calle 150 y Calle 152, Avenida 44; San Antonio, Belén, Heredia; Costa Rica
- Coordinates: 9.978454°N 84.185014°W
- Operator: Incofer
- Line: Interurbano
Location

Belén railway station (Spanish: Estación de Belén) is a railway station managed by Incofer and located in San Antonio district, Belén canton, Heredia province, of Costa Rica.

The building, of Victorian inspired design, was built in 1900 as part of the railway to the Pacific, on such decommissioned line, the station was the Number 5. It was restored by the Belén Municipality and Incofer in 2011 for the Interurbano line, at a cost of CRC ₡73.6 million.
