= Pacific station (disambiguation) =

The Pacific Station was an operating unit of the Royal Navy in the nineteenth century. It could also refer to:

- Maritime Forces Pacific, also known as the Canadian Pacific Station, an operating unit of the Royal Canadian Navy
- Pacific station (British Columbia), a train station in Pacific, British Columbia, Canada
- Pacific Avenue station, a light rail station in Long Beach, California, United States
- Estación Pacífico, one of two primary downtown train stations in San José, Costa Rica
- Pacific Squadron, a former operating unit of the United States Navy
- Pacific Station (TV series), a television series
