= Río Azul District =

District in La Unión canton, Cartago province, Costa Rica

Río Azul
- District
- Río Azul district
- Río Azul district location in Costa Rica
- Coordinates: 9.8872402°N 84.0204979°W
- Country: Costa Rica
- Province: Cartago
- Canton: La Unión
- Creation: 15 July 1968

Area
  - Total: 4.89 km^{2} (1.89 sq mi)
- Elevation: 1,200 m (3,900 ft)

Population (2011)
  - Total: 12,010
  - Density: 2,460/km^{2} (6,360/sq mi)
- Time zone: UTC−06:00
- Postal code: 30308

Río Azul is a district of the La Unión canton, in the Cartago province of Costa Rica.

== History ==
Río Azul was created on 15 July 1968 by Ley 4148. Segregated from San Diego.

== Geography ==
Río Azul has an area of 4.89 km² and an elevation of 1,200 metres.

== Demographics ==
Historical population
Census	Pop.	±% p.a.
1973	1,787	—
1984	6,206	+11.98%
2000	10,427	+3.30%
2011	12,010	+1.29%
2022	11,617	−0.30%
Source: Instituto Nacional de Estadística y Censos; Centro Centroamericano de Población

For the 2011 census, Río Azul had a population of 12,010 inhabitants.

== Transportation ==
=== Road transportation ===
The district is covered by the following road routes:

- National Route 409
