= La Unión (canton) =

Canton in Cartago province, Costa Rica

- Canton
- Flag Seal
- Interactive map of La Unión
- La Unión canton location in Costa Rica
- Coordinates: 9.9135636°N 83.9944093°W
- Country: Costa Rica
- Province: Cartago
- Creation: 7 December 1848
- Head city: Tres Ríos
- Districts: Districts: Tres Ríos; San Diego; San Juan; San Rafael; Concepción; Dulce Nombre; San Ramón; Río Azul

Government
  - Type: Municipality
  - Body: Municipalidad de La Unión

Area
  - Total: 44.83 km^{2} (17.31 sq mi)
- Elevation: 1,331 m (4,367 ft)

Population (2011)
  - Total: 99,399
  - Density: 2,217/km^{2} (5,743/sq mi)
- Time zone: UTC−06:00
- Canton code: 303
- Website: launion.go.cr

La Unión is a canton in the Cartago province of Costa Rica. The head city is in Tres Ríos district.

== Toponymy ==
A story tells of a group of Spanish missionaries from a convent in Guatemala, arriving accompanied by Indians of different cultural groups. The small town they established was called La Unión, meaning The Union, to commemorate their friendliness and brotherhood.

== History ==
La Unión was created on 7 December 1848 by decree 167.

== Geography ==
La Unión has an area of 44.83 km^{2} and a mean elevation of 1,331 metres. La Unión is a compact canton situated midway between the national capital of San José and the former colonial capital city of Cartago.

== Districts ==
The canton of La Unión is subdivided into the following districts:

1. Tres Ríos
2. San Diego
3. San Juan
4. San Rafael
5. Concepción
6. Dulce Nombre
7. San Ramón
8. Río Azul

== Demographics ==
Historical population
Census	Pop.	±% p.a.
1864	2,046	—
1883	2,916	+1.88%
1892	4,256	+4.29%
1927	4,972	+0.45%
1950	7,789	+1.97%
1963	14,074	+4.66%
1973	23,352	+5.19%
1984	41,005	+5.25%
2000	80,279	+4.29%
2011	99,399	+1.96%
2022	99,539	+0.01%
Source: Instituto Nacional de Estadística y Censos; Centro Centroamericano de Población

For the 2011 census, La Unión had a population of 99,399 inhabitants.

== Education ==
The Lycée Franco Costaricien, a French international school, is in Concepción district.

== Transportation ==
=== Road transportation ===
The canton is covered by the following road routes:

- National Route 2
- National Route 202
- National Route 221
- National Route 251
- National Route 409

=== Rail transportation ===
The Interurbano Line operated by Incofer goes through this canton.
