= Calle de la Amargura =

Street in San José, Costa Rica

- Calle 61
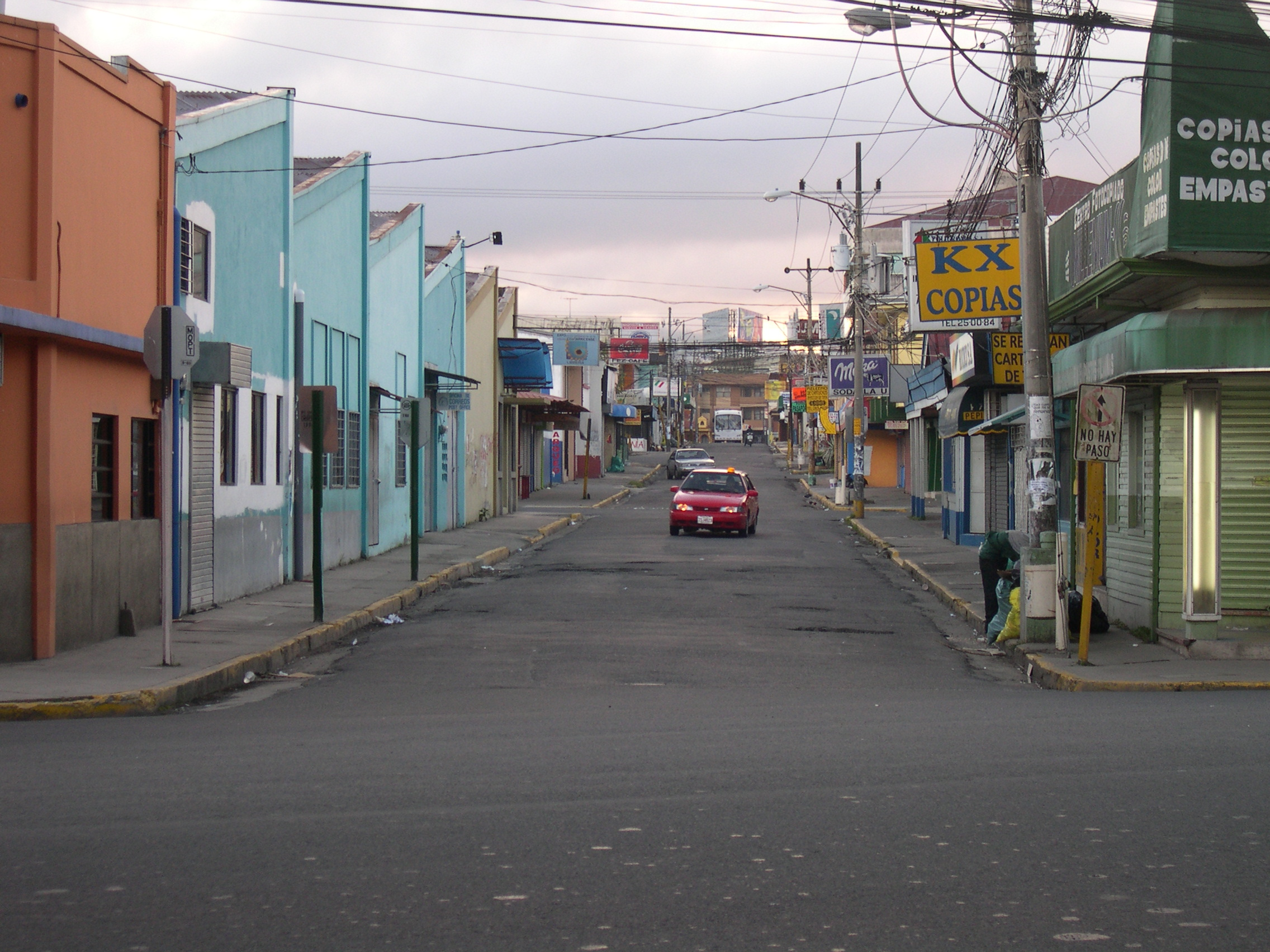
- Interactive map of Calle de la Amargura
- Type: Cantonal street
- Maintained by: Municipality of Montes de Oca
- Length: 640 m (2,100 ft)
- Location: San Pedro, Montes de Oca, San José, Costa Rica
- Postal code: 11501
- Coordinates: 9°56′00″N 84°03′03″W
- North end: Avenida 7
- South end: Route 2

The Calle de la Amargura ("Bitterness Street") is a four-block-long street located in San Pedro district, Montes de Oca canton, and is one of the best-known zones near San José city. La Calle, as it is often called, is very close to the University of Costa Rica (UCR) and other important higher education centers.

== Services ==
La Calle consists of small stores, nightclubs, and bars, most of which are open every day. The area is mostly known for its extensive nightlife scene.

Besides its infamous nightlife (see below) it is frequented by UCR students due to the cheap food and photocopying services.

== Name Origin ==
The name "Calle de la Amargura" is a reference to another street of the same name located in San Lucas Island through which incoming prisoners at the dock had to traverse in order to get to the administrative building of the prison. Because the condemned knew they would not be able to escape after reaching the end of the road, an analogy was made for its counterpart in San Pedro, since this road is also long, full of distractions, and preceded the entrance to the University of Costa Rica, the final destination.

== Nightlife ==
There are many bars and discos on the main road, known for their late night operations. It used to be one of the epicenters of nightlife in downtown San José until the early 2020s, however, nightlife has been moving to other neighbourhoods in the city, like Barrio Escalante and Barrio La California.

== Crime ==
La Calle is often thought to be a dangerous place at night. Drug dealing is a very common activity and police officers usually come heavily armed. Petty theft and pickpocketing are very common, and visitors are advised to carry few valuables. Suggestions for visitors would be to only bring an identification card and just enough money for drinks and a ride home, to stay in a group on the main road, and to not start any type of fighting or respond to any remarks.
