= Pacífico station =

Pacífico station may refer to:

- Pacífico railway station, San Jose, Costa Rica
- Pacífico (Madrid Metro), Spain
