= National Route 221 (Costa Rica) =

National Road Route in Costa Rica

National Secondary Route 221
- Ruta nacional secundaria 221

Route information
- Maintained by Ministry of Public Works and Transport
- Length: 7.965 km (4.949 mi)

Location
- Country: Costa Rica
- Provinces: San José, Cartago

Highway system
- National Road Network of Costa Rica
← Route 220	→ Route 222

National Secondary Route 221, or just Route 221 (Spanish: Ruta Nacional Secundaria 221, or Ruta 221) is a National Road Route of Costa Rica, located in the San José, Cartago provinces.

== Description ==
In San José province the route covers Curridabat canton (Curridabat, Granadilla, and Sánchez districts).

In Cartago province the route covers La Unión canton (Tres Ríos, Concepción, and Dulce Nombre districts).
