= National Route 202 (Costa Rica) =

National Road Route in Costa Rica

National Secondary Route 202
- Ruta nacional secundaria 202

Route information
- Maintained by Ministry of Public Works and Transport
- Length: 13.430 km (8.345 mi)

Location
- Country: Costa Rica
- Provinces: San José, Cartago

Highway system
- National Road Network of Costa Rica
← Route 201	→ Route 203

National Secondary Route 202, or just Route 202 (Spanish: Ruta Nacional Secundaria 202, or Ruta 202) is a National Road Route of Costa Rica, located in the San José, Cartago provinces.

== Description ==
In San José province the route covers Montes de Oca canton (San Pedro, Sabanilla, Mercedes, and San Rafael districts).

In Cartago province the route covers La Unión canton (Tres Ríos, Concepción, Dulce Nombre, and San Ramón districts).
