= National Route 306 (Costa Rica) =

National Road Route in Costa Rica

National Tertiary Route 306
- Ruta nacional terciaria 306

Route information
- Maintained by Ministry of Public Works and Transport
- Length: 3.615 km (2.246 mi)

Location
- Country: Costa Rica
- Provinces: San José

Highway system
- National Road Network of Costa Rica
← Route 304	→ Route 307

National Tertiary Route 306, or just Route 306 (Spanish: Ruta Nacional Terciaria 306, or Ruta 306) is a National Road Route of Costa Rica, located in the San José province.

== Description ==
In San José province the route covers Montes de Oca canton (San Pedro, San Rafael districts), Curridabat canton (Granadilla district).
