= Mercedes District, Montes de Oca =

District in Montes de Oca canton, San José province, Costa Rica

Mercedes
- District
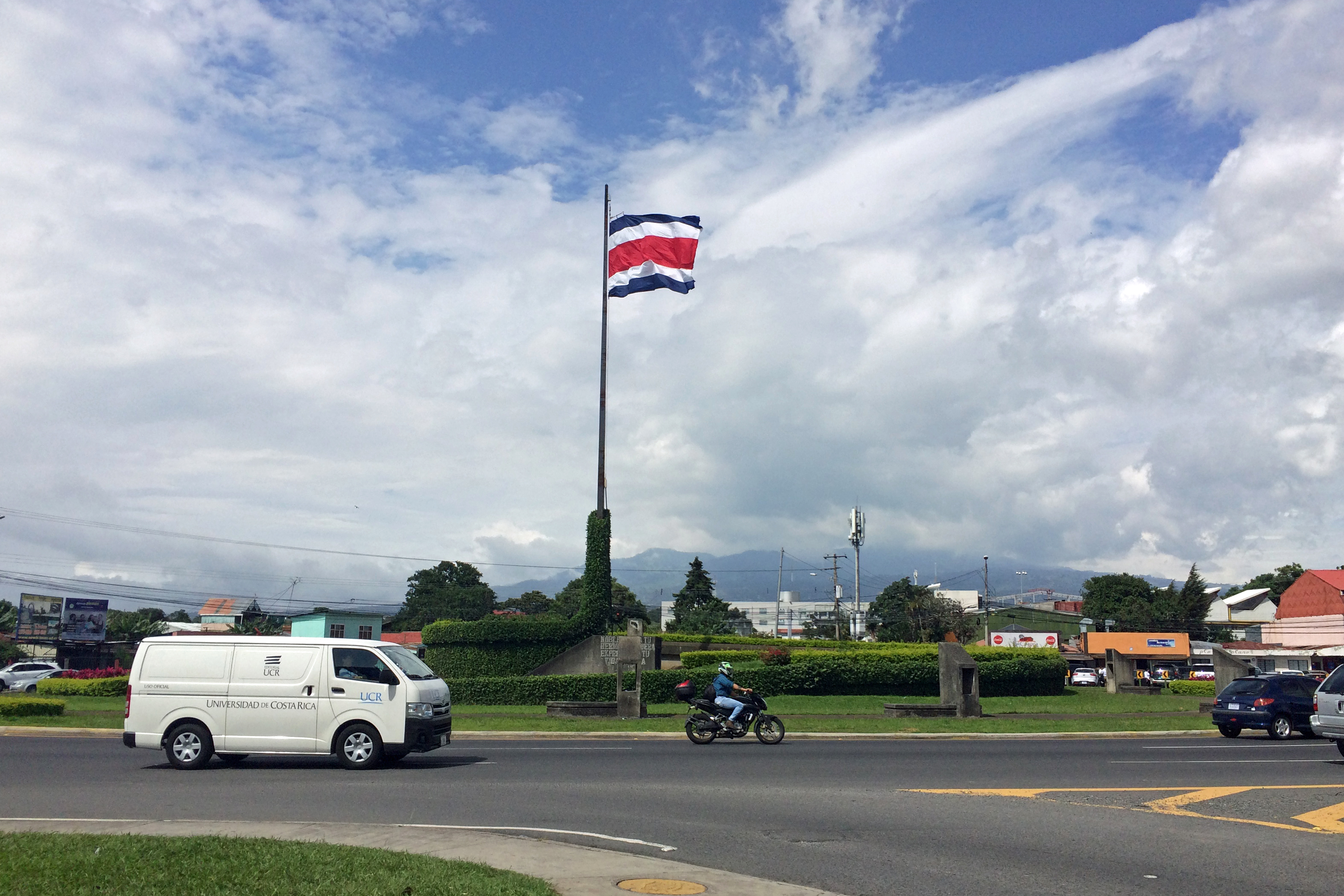
- La Bandera roundabout in 2016, on Route 39 in this district.
- Interactive map of Mercedes
- Mercedes district location in Costa Rica
- Coordinates: 9.9436866°N 84.0503309°W
- Country: Costa Rica
- Province: San José
- Canton: Montes de Oca

Area
  - Total: 1.44 km^{2} (0.56 sq mi)
- Elevation: 1,200 m (3,900 ft)

Population (2011)
  - Total: 4,688
  - Density: 3,260/km^{2} (8,430/sq mi)
- Time zone: UTC−06:00
- Postal code: 11503

Mercedes is a district of the Montes de Oca canton, in the San José province of Costa Rica.

== Geography ==
Mercedes has an area of 1.44 km^{2} and an elevation of 1,200 metres.

== Locations ==
Barrios (neighborhoods): Betania, Alma Máter, Damiana, Dent (part), Guaymí, Paso Hondo, Paulina, Profesores

== Demographics ==
Historical population
Census	Pop.	±% p.a.
1927	413	—
1950	1,358	+5.31%
1963	2,800	+5.72%
1973	3,815	+3.14%
1984	4,419	+1.35%
2000	4,872	+0.61%
2011	4,688	−0.35%
2022	4,189	−1.02%
Source: Instituto Nacional de Estadística y Censos; Centro Centroamericano de Población

For the 2011 census, Mercedes had a population of 4,688 inhabitants.

== Transportation ==
=== Road transportation ===
The district is covered by the following road routes:

- National Route 39
- National Route 201
- National Route 202
