= National Route 203 (Costa Rica) =

National Road Route in Costa Rica

National Secondary Route 203
- Ruta nacional secundaria 203

Route information
- Maintained by Ministry of Public Works and Transport
- Length: 3.620 km (2.249 mi)

Location
- Country: Costa Rica
- Provinces: San José

Highway system
- National Road Network of Costa Rica
| ← Route 202 | → Route 204 |

National Secondary Route 203, or just Route 203 (Spanish: Ruta Nacional Secundaria 203, or Ruta 203) is a National Road Route of Costa Rica, located in the San José province.

== Description ==
In San José province the route covers Montes de Oca canton (San Pedro, Sabanilla, and San Rafael districts).
