= Sánchez District =

District in Curridabat canton, San José province, Costa Rica

Sánchez
- District
- Sánchez district
- Sánchez district location in Costa Rica
- Coordinates: 9.9130792°N 84.0167642°W
- Country: Costa Rica
- Province: San José
- Canton: Curridabat

Area
  - Total: 4.53 km^{2} (1.75 sq mi)
- Elevation: 1,250 m (4,100 ft)

Population (2011)
  - Total: 5,364
  - Density: 1,180/km^{2} (3,070/sq mi)
- Time zone: UTC−06:00
- Postal code: 11803

Sánchez is a district of the Curridabat canton, in the San José province of Costa Rica.

== Geography ==
Sánchez has an area of 4.53 km^{2} and an elevation of 1,250 metres.

== Demographics ==
Historical population
Census	Pop.	±% p.a.
1950	564	—
1963	816	+2.88%
1973	872	+0.67%
1984	1,418	+4.52%
2000	3,147	+5.11%
2011	5,364	+4.97%
2022	6,942	+2.37%
Source: Instituto Nacional de Estadística y Censos; Centro Centroamericano de Población

For the 2011 census, Sánchez had a population of 5,364 inhabitants.

== Transportation ==
=== Road transportation ===
The district is covered by the following road routes:

- National Route 2
- National Route 221
- National Route 251
- National Route 252

=== Rail transportation ===
The Interurbano Line operated by Incofer goes through this district.
