= National Route 251 (Costa Rica) =

National Road Route in Costa Rica

National Secondary Route 251
- Ruta nacional secundaria 251

Route information
- Maintained by Ministry of Public Works and Transport
- Length: 6.905 km (4.291 mi)

Location
- Country: Costa Rica
- Provinces: San José, Cartago

Highway system
- National Road Network of Costa Rica
← Route 250	→ Route 252

National Secondary Route 251, or just Route 251 (Spanish: Ruta Nacional Secundaria 251, or Ruta 251) is a National Road Route of Costa Rica, located in the San José, Cartago provinces.

== Description ==
In San José province the route covers Curridabat canton (Curridabat and Sánchez districts).

In Cartago province the route covers La Unión canton (Tres Ríos, San Juan, and San Rafael districts).
