= San Rafael District, Montes de Oca =

District in Montes de Oca canton, San José province, Costa Rica

San Rafael
- District
- San Rafael district
- San Rafael district location in Costa Rica
- Coordinates: 9.9454726°N 83.9929725°W
- Country: Costa Rica
- Province: San José
- Canton: Montes de Oca

Area
  - Total: 7.74 km^{2} (2.99 sq mi)
- Elevation: 1,340 m (4,400 ft)

Population (2011)
  - Total: 9,692
  - Density: 1,250/km^{2} (3,240/sq mi)
- Time zone: UTC−06:00
- Postal code: 11504

San Rafael is a district of the Montes de Oca canton, in the San José province of Costa Rica.

== Geography ==
San Rafael has an area of 7.74 km^{2} and an elevation of 1,340 metres.

== Locations ==
Barrios (neighborhoods): Alameda, Andrómeda, Begonia, Cuesta Grande (part), El Cristo (parte), Estéfana (part), Europa, Liburgia, Mansiones (part), Maruz, Salitrillos

== Demographics ==
Historical population
Census	Pop.	±% p.a.
1950	967	—
1963	1,454	+3.19%
1973	2,622	+6.07%
1984	3,365	+2.29%
2000	7,713	+5.32%
2011	9,692	+2.10%
2022	14,187	+3.52%
Source: Instituto Nacional de Estadística y Censos; Centro Centroamericano de Población

For the 2011 census, San Rafael had a population of 9,692 inhabitants.

== Economy ==
One of its main economic activities is the plantation of cypress, used as Christmas trees in Costa Rica. Along with its immediate neighbors San Ramón District and Mata de Plátano District, it forms one of the main cypress production areas in all the Costa Rican Central Region.

== Transportation ==
=== Road transportation ===
The district is covered by the following road routes:

- National Route 202
- National Route 203
- National Route 306
