= Latin University of Costa Rica =

Private university in Costa Rica

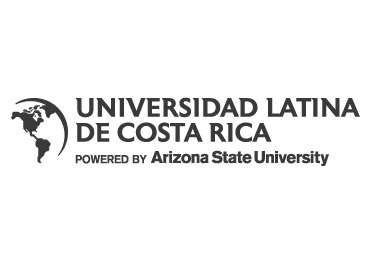
- Logo of the Latin University of Costa Rica
- Latin: Universitas Latina Costaricae
- Type: Private university
- Established: November 29, 1989; 36 years ago
- Rector: Rosa Monge Monge
- Location: San Pedro, Montes de Oca, Costa Rica; 9°55′57.36″N 84°02′36″W
- Website: www.ulatina.ac.cr

Latin University of Costa Rica (Spanish: Universidad Latina de Costa Rica), commonly called ULatina, is the largest private university in Costa Rica, with more than 16,000 students enrolled in undergraduate and graduate programs in Business, Education, Engineering, Health Sciences, and Social Sciences. It was founded in 1989. The university is accredited by the National Council of Higher Education (CONESUP).

== Campus ==
The university has two main campuses: Campus San Pedro, that is in San Pedro, San José, in the central area of private and state universities; and Campus Heredia (former Universidad Interamericana de Costa Rica) which is in the city of Heredia.

The university has 6 regional offices throughout Costa Rica: Grecia, Cañas, Santa Cruz, Guápiles, Pérez Zeledón and Ciudad Neily.

In October of 2020 the Universidad Latina and Arizona State University (ASU) formed a partnership creating ULatina/ASU Dual Degrees, other aspects of this partnership include both online or at the ASU Campus opportunities, implementing English in all their programs, access to ASU faculty student and faculty abroad, and much more.

== History ==
=== Campus San Pedro ===
Universidad Latina de Costa Rica was founded in 1979 as the “Collegium Latinum”, being part of the Autonomous University of Central America (UACA), Costa Rica's oldest private higher learning institution. The collegium separated from UACA ten years after its foundation, becoming a separate university.

On November 29, 1989, it was recognized as a university of higher education by the National Council of Higher Education Private University (CONESUP) in the session 146-89.

Since then the university has been known for its academic commitment at the courses offered to become the largest private university in the country. In 2005 it was acquired by Pro-Education Consortium; until June 2008 it was acquired by the network of private universities, Laureate International Universities, opening a new outlook of opportunities for university students, with a global network to continue graduate studies.

=== Campus Heredia ===
Universidad Latina de Costa Rica (former Universidad Interamericana de Costa Rica) was founded in 1986 with 28 students in Business Administration, later implementing technical careers and undergraduate levels.

In 1997 the university moved to its new and current campus in Heredia. Since 2004 the school has been owned by the Laureate International Universities. In 2007, it expanded its facilities in Mercedes Tower on Paseo Colon in San Jose downtown. In 2010 the 'Universidad Interamericana de Costa Rica' merged with the 'Latina de Costa Rica' to form the new 'Universidad Latina de Costa Rica'.

== Admissions ==
Universidad Latina de Costa Rica enrolls approximately 19,000 undergraduate and 2,000 graduate students. For undergraduate levels, students must have a High School Diploma granted by passing the national examinations by the MEP or its equivalent before enrolling. (Latin University of Costa Rica does not have an entrance examination.)

The university offers bachelor, licentiate, master and doctorate degrees.

== Campuses ==
The geographical coverage of the university is expanded thanks to the integration of both campuses. It is present in 7 provinces with 10 regional offices, and 2 main campuses in Heredia and in San Pedro, San José.

Regional offices of the Universidad Latina de Costa Rica:

- North Pacific, in Santa Cruz and Cañas, Guanacaste
- Central Pacific, in the central county of the province of Puntarenas
- South Pacific, in San Isidro del General and the City of Paso Canoas in the province of Puntarenas
- Atlantic, in Turrialba, Guápiles and the central canton of the province of Limon
- North West, in Palmares and Grecia

== Accredited degrees ==
The Universidad Latina de Costa Rica holds six official accredited degrees that have been accredited by the National Accreditation System for Higher Education (SINAES):

- Bachelor of Business Administration with majors in:
  - Marketing
  - Finance
  - Human Resources
  - International Trade
- Bachelor's in Public Relations
- Bachelor's and Licentiate in Industrial Engineering
- Bachelor's in Computer Systems Engineering
- Bachelor's in Hospitality Management
- Bachelor's and Licentiate in Nursing

In August 2016, the university officially presented its plan and commitment to make all degrees accredited by 2021.

== Undergraduate degrees ==
=== Health Sciences ===
- Medicine
- Dentistry
- Optometry
- Physical Therapy
- Nursing
- Pharmacy
- Social Work
- Psychology

=== Social Sciences ===
- Law
- Journalism
- Advertising
- Advertise with major in
  - Creativity and Media Production
  - Advertising Strategy
- International Relations
- Public Relations
- Marketing Communication
- Media Production
- Graphic Design

=== Engineering Technologies ===
- Systems Engineering
- Software Engineering
- Information Technology for Business Management
- Network Engineering and Telematics

=== Hotel Management and Gastronomy ===
- Hotel Business Management
- Diploma in Culinary Arts
- Biology with major in Ecology and Sustainable Development
- Tourism with major in Hotels and Restaurants

=== Education ===
- Special Education with major in:

Emotional Disorders
Communication Disorders
Mental Retardation
Speech Therapy, Speech and Voice
Education I and II Cycle

- Education with major on

Integration for Students with Disabilities
Computer Education

- Bilingual Preschool
- Computer Science Education
- English Teaching
- Educational Administration

=== Economic Sciences ===
- Business Administration
- Business Administration with major in:

Marketing
Human Resources
Economics
International Trade
Finance
Computing
Insurance
Financial Institutions
Development of Your Own Company
Accounting
Economics

=== Engineering and Architecture ===
- Architecture
- Civil Engineering
- Electric Engineering
- Electronic Engineering
- Industrial Engineering
- Mechanical Engineering
- Electronics and Communications Engineering
- Electromechanical Engineering
- Design and Interior Decoration
