= Montes de Oca (canton) =

Canton in San José province, Costa Rica

- Canton
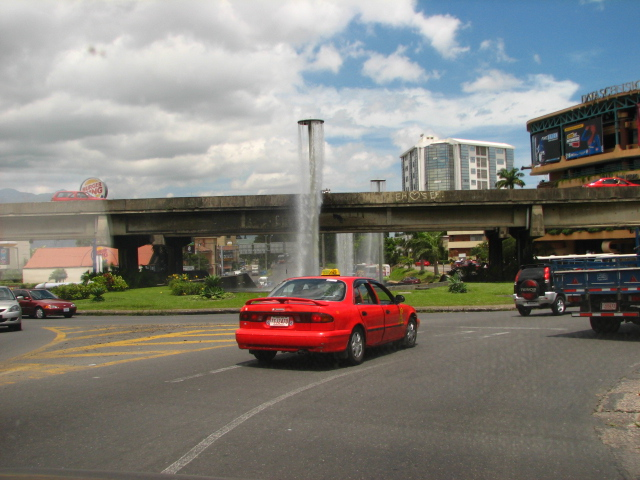
- Fuente de la Hispanidad, roundabout under Route 39 and on Route 2

- Flag Seal
- Motto(s): Cuna de la Educación Superior (Cradle of Higher Education)
- Montes de Oca canton
- Montes de Oca canton location in San José Province Montes de Oca canton location in Costa Rica
- Coordinates: 9.940046°N 84.0110652°W
- Country: Costa Rica
- Province: San José
- Creation: 1 August 1915
- Named for: Don Faustino Montes de Oca
- Head city: San Pedro
- Districts: Districts: San Pedro; Sabanilla; Mercedes; San Rafael

Government
  - Type: Municipality
  - Body: Municipalidad de Montes de Oca
  - Mayor: Domingo Arguello García (PUSC)

Area
  - Total: 15.78 km^{2} (6.09 sq mi)
- Elevation: 1,262 m (4,140 ft)

Population (2011)
  - Total: 49,132
  - Estimate (2022): 53,862
  - Density: 3,114/km^{2} (8,064/sq mi)
- Time zone: UTC−06:00
- Canton code: 115
- Website: montesdeoca.go.cr

Montes de Oca is a canton in the San José province of Costa Rica. The head city of the canton is San Pedro.

== Toponymy ==
Its name honors a former congressional representative from the area, Don Faustino Montes de Oca (1859–1902).

== History ==
Montes de Oca was created on 1 August 1915 by decree 45.

== Government ==
=== Mayor ===
According to Costa Rica's Municipal Code, mayors are elected every four years by the population of the canton. As of the latest municipal elections in 2024, the Social Christian Unity Party (PUSC) candidate, Domingo Arguello García, was elected mayor of the canton with 25.56% of the votes, with Haydee Castillo Castro (Note: Also legally named Heidi Castillo Castro.) and Andrés Vesalio Guzmán Gómez as first and second vice mayors, respectively.

Mayors of Montes de Oca since the 2002 elections
Period	Name	Party
2002–2006	Sonia María Montero Díaz	PAC
2006–2010	Fernando Trejos Ballestero	UPC
2010–2016	Fernando Trejos Ballestero	PRC
2016–2020	Marcel Soler Rubio	CGMO
2020–2024	Marcel Soler Rubio	CGMO
2024–2028	Domingo Arguello García	PUSC

=== Municipal Council ===
Like the mayor and vice mayors, members of the Municipal Council (called regidores) are elected every four years. Montes de Oca's Municipal Council has 7 seats for regidores and their substitutes, who can participate in meetings but not vote unless the owning regidor (regidor propietario) is absent. The current president of the Municipal Council is National Liberation Party regidor Enrique Sibaja Granados, with Social Christian Unity Party regidora Jeiny Lizano Vargas as vice-president. The Municipal Council's composition for the 2024–2028 period is as follows:

Composition of the Municipal Council of Montes de Oca after the 2024 municipal elections
Political parties in the Municipal Council of Montes de Oca
Political party	Regidores		
Political party	№	Owner	Substitute
Social Christian Unity Party (PUSC)	2	Jeiny Lizano Vargas^{(VP)}	Jessica Viviana Mora Romero
Social Christian Unity Party (PUSC)	2	Jeison Francisco Salazar López	Jorge Antonio Mora Portuguez
Montes de Oca People Coalition (CGMO)	2	Carolina Monge Castilla	Kimberly María Ortiz Villalta
Montes de Oca People Coalition (CGMO)	2	Jorge Luis Espinoza Camacho	Gustavo Campos Alfaro
National Liberation Party (PLN)	1	Enrique Sibaja Granados^{(P)}	Danilo Rodríguez Arias
We Are Montes de Oca Coalition (CSMO)	1	Marta Cleotilde Corrales Sánchez	Irene Salazar Carvajal
In Common Party (PEC)	1	Kattia López Alvarado	Maritere Alvarado Achio

== Geography ==
Montes de Oca has an area of 15.78 km^{2} (6.09 sq mi) and a mean elevation of 1,262 m (4,140 ft).

The elongated canton reaches from the suburbs of the national capital of San José eastward to the province of Cartago, and neighbors the cantons of Curridabat, San José, Cartago, and Goicoechea. The Torres River delineate a portion of the northern boundary, while the Ocloro River and Poró Creek mark the southern boundary.

== Districts ==
The canton of Montes de Oca is subdivided into the following districts:

1. San Pedro
2. Sabanilla
3. Mercedes
4. San Rafael

== Demographics ==
Historical population
Census	Pop.	±% p.a.
1927	3,676	—
1950	9,916	+4.41%
1963	24,043	+7.05%
1973	33,633	+3.41%
1984	39,065	+1.37%
2000	50,433	+1.61%
2011	49,132	−0.24%
2022	53,862	+0.84%
Source: Instituto Nacional de Estadística y Censos; Centro Centroamericano de Población

Montes de Oca had an estimated 53,862 inhabitants in 2022, up from 49,132 at the time of the 2011 census.

The canton is known for its high level of commercial development, the number of universities and other centers of higher education, and its active night life. It is one of the most urbanized and vibrant cantons in the San José area, both day and night.

In 2022, Montes de Oca ranked fourth highest in the Costa Rican cantonal Human Development Index, with a score of 0.857.

== Education ==
Montes de Oca is known in Costa Rica as the Cradle of Higher Education as it is home to the University of Costa Rica as well as other university-level centers of study, such as the Universidad Latina and the Universidad Americana (UAM) Escuela Laboratorio. The canton can boast of 99% literacy, compared with 95% in Costa Rica at large.

== Points of interest ==
Mall San Pedro

- Fuente de la Hispanidad (The Fountain of Hispanity), a large fountain in a major roundabout built in the mid-80s that focuses on Costa Rica's cultural heritage. It is a major landmark in the area.
- Mall San Pedro, a shopping center built in the mid-90s, contains tattoo parlors, a movie theater, a food court, video game shops, and clothing stores.
- Iglesia de San Pedro (San Pedro Catholic Church)
- Calle de la Amargura (Bitterness Street) a street centered around the nightlife of the University of Costa Rica.

== Transportation ==
=== Road transportation ===
The canton is covered by the following road routes:

- National Route 2
- National Route 39
- National Route 201
- National Route 202
- National Route 203
- National Route 306

=== Rail transportation ===
The Interurbano Line operated by Incofer goes through this canton.
