= Atlántico railway station =

Major railway station in Costa Rica

Atlántico railway station Estación del Ferrocarril al Atlántico
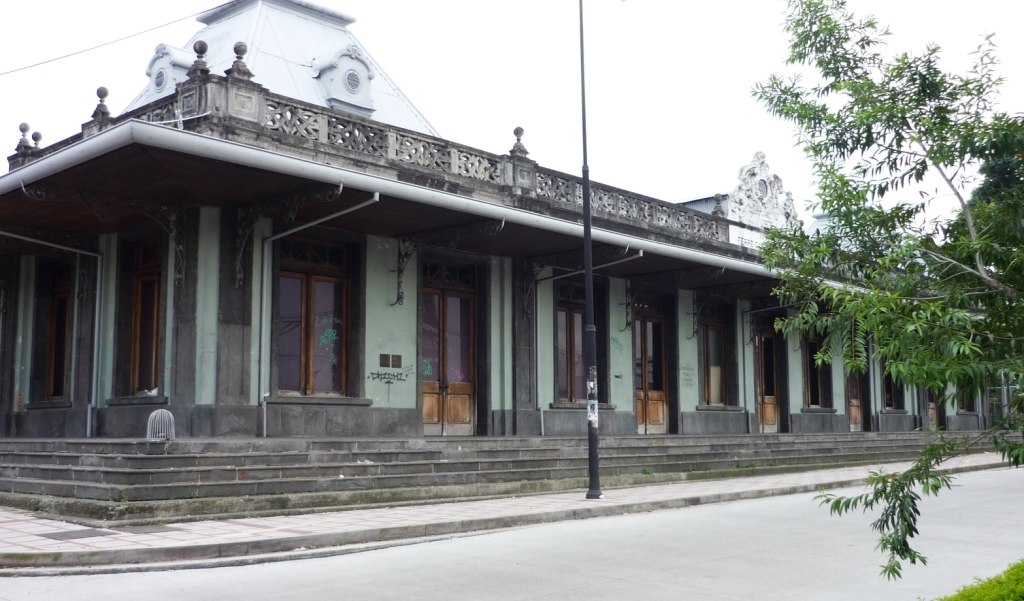
- Exterior of Atlántico station, 2010

General information
- Location: Avenida Jenaro Cardona, Carmen, San José; Costa Rica
- Coordinates: 9.93459°N 84.06886°W
- Operator: Incofer
- Line: Interurbano

History
- Opened: 1908, 2011
- Closed: 1996-2011
Location

Atlántico railway station (Spanish: Estación del Ferrocarril al Atlántico) is a railway station and historic building located in San José, Costa Rica, declared as Architectural Patrimony of Costa Rica by decree 11664-C of 29 July 1980.

Built in 1908 and open until 1996, it was the main railway station between San José and Limón, where the main freight port is located.

The emblematic building combines victorian, neoclassical, and baroque architectures, with some modernist details.

In 2011, a restoration effort by the Ministry of Culture and Youth took place to reopen the station as a railway station for the urban train between the cantons of San José, Alajuela, Cartago, and Heredia.

== Shapes, Spaces, and Sounds Museum ==
Between 2002 and 2008, the station was the location of the Shapes, Spaces, and Sounds Museum (Spanish: Museo de Formas Espacios y Sonidos). The museum closed in October 2007.

== See also ==
- Rail transport in Costa Rica
- Interurbano Line
- List of museums in Costa Rica
