= National Route 201 (Costa Rica) =

National Road Route in Costa Rica

National Secondary Route 201
- Ruta nacional secundaria 201

Route information
- Maintained by Ministry of Public Works and Transport
- Length: 1.550 km (0.963 mi)

Location
- Country: Costa Rica
- Provinces: San José

Highway system
- National Road Network of Costa Rica
← Route 200	→ Route 202

National Secondary Route 201, or just Route 201 (Spanish: Ruta Nacional Secundaria 201, or Ruta 201) is a National Road Route of Costa Rica, located in the San José province.

== Description ==
In San José province the route covers Goicoechea canton (Guadalupe and Calle Blancos districts) and Montes de Oca canton (Mercedes district).
