= San Antonio District, Belén =

District in Belén canton, Heredia province, Costa Rica

San Antonio
- District
- San Antonio district
- San Antonio district location in Costa Rica
- Coordinates: 9.9781433°N 84.1879207°W
- Country: Costa Rica
- Province: Heredia
- Canton: Belén

Area
  - Total: 3.54 km^{2} (1.37 sq mi)
- Elevation: 912 m (2,992 ft)

Population (2011)
  - Total: 9,942
  - Density: 2,810/km^{2} (7,270/sq mi)
- Time zone: UTC−06:00
- Postal code: 40701

San Antonio is a district of the Belén canton, in the Heredia province of Costa Rica.

== Geography ==
San Antonio has an area of 3.54 km^{2} and an elevation of 912 metres.

== Locations ==
- Barrios: Chompipes (part), Escobal, Labores (part), San Vicente, Zaiquí

== Demographics ==
Historical population
Census	Pop.	±% p.a.
1864	593	—
1883	1,560	+5.22%
1892	1,207	−2.81%
1927	1,554	+0.72%
1950	1,678	+0.33%
1963	2,429	+2.89%
1973	4,334	+5.96%
1984	5,895	+2.84%
2000	10,256	+3.52%
2011	9,942	−0.28%
2022	11,784	+1.56%
Source: Instituto Nacional de Estadística y Censos; Centro Centroamericano de Población

For the 2011 census, San Antonio had a population of 9,942 inhabitants.

== Transportation ==
=== Road transportation ===
The district is covered by the following road routes:

- National Route 111
- National Route 122

=== Rail transportation ===
The Interurbano Line operated by Incofer goes through this district.
