= National Route 409 (Costa Rica) =

National Road Route in Costa Rica

National Tertiary Route 409
- Ruta nacional terciaria 409

Route information
- Maintained by Ministry of Public Works and Transport
- Length: 8.675 km (5.390 mi)

Location
- Country: Costa Rica
- Provinces: San José, Cartago

Highway system
- National Road Network of Costa Rica
← Route 408	→ Route 411

National Tertiary Route 409, or just Route 409 (Spanish: Ruta Nacional Terciaria 409, or Ruta 409) is a National Road Route of Costa Rica, located in the San José, Cartago provinces.

== Description ==
In San José province the route covers Desamparados canton (San Antonio district).

In Cartago province the route covers La Unión canton (Tres Ríos, San Diego, Río Azul districts).
