= Lycée Franco-Costaricien =

Lycée Franco Costaricien
- Liceo Franco-Costarricense
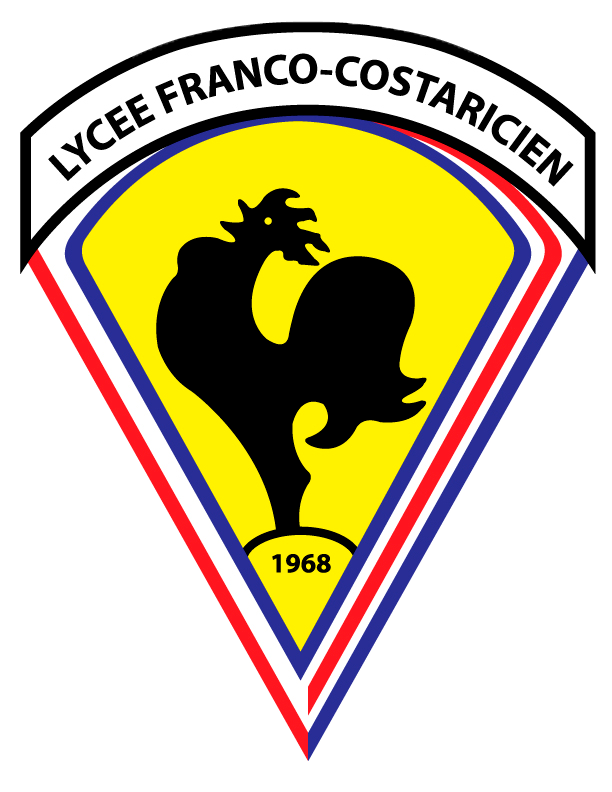

Location
- De la casa de Don José Figueres, 4.5 Km. Noreste, carretera a Concepción de Tres Ríos [[Curridabat (canton)|Curridabat]] Costa Rica
- Coordinates: 9.9279735°N 84.00485200000003°W

Information
- Type: K-12 school
- Established: November 30th, 1967
- Founders: French Government and Costa Rican Government
- Director: Marie-Laure Petton
- Grades: K-12
- Years taught: 15
- Enrollment: 1000+
- Average class size: 27
- Language: French, Spanish and English
- Mascot: Rooster
- Nickname: "El Franco" in Spanish
- Tuition: 263.000₡
- Website: franco.ed.cr
- Institución Benemérita de la Educación y la Cultura Costarricense

The Benemérito Lycée Franco-Costaricien (Spanish: Benemérito Liceo Franco-Costarricense) is a French international school in Sánchez District, Curridabat, San José Province, Costa Rica. It serves levels until the final year of senior high school, terminale.

In the year 2023, it was named Institución Benemérita de la Educación y la Cultura Costarricense, by the law 10355

== Timeline ==
1967: Cultural cooperation agreement between Costa Rica and France, by exchange of notes N° 62 RE and number 53335-AE of 30 November 1967.

1968: Installation of the high school in the "Casa de los Leones" (Paseo Colón).

1969: Promulgation of Law 4481 of 9 December 1969 and opening of the primary school.

1972: First graduating class (33 diplomas).

1975: Opening of a preparatory course.

1976-1977: Transfer to Concepción de Tres Ríos.

1980: Opening of a second level in nursery school.

1982: Inauguration of scientific laboratories.

1988: Inauguration of the gymnasium and sports fields.

1990: Opening of the "Petite Section" in the nursery and of the Terminale classes.

1995: Inauguration of the new CDI, the Students' House and the Theatre Hall.

1997: Unification of programmes and reorganisation of the primary school. Inauguration of the school canteen and the new changing rooms in the gymnasium.

2003: Opening of the high school website.

2009: Reform of the cultural cooperation agreement, by exchange of notes DM-DGPE-289-09 and 218 of 28 April 2009.

2012: Amendment to the 2009 agreement, by decree No. 36969-RE of 26/03/2012.

2016: Approval of the Modernisation Plan of the Franco-Costa Rican high school, by exchange of letters 2016-679937 of 21/09/2016.

2018: Fiftieth anniversary of the high school, inauguration of the athletics track and renovation of the nursery area.

2019: Inauguration of new classrooms in secondary school.

2020-2021: Renovation of the exterior wall of the high school.

2022: Inauguration of the new school canteen and transformation of the old canteen into classrooms.

2023: Awarded the Benemeritazgo and named Institución Benemérita de la Educación y la Cultura Costarricense.

== See also ==
- Institut français d'Amérique centrale
