= Dulce Nombre District, La Unión =

District in La Unión canton, Cartago province, Costa Rica

Dulce Nombre
- District
- Interactive map of Dulce Nombre
- Dulce Nombre district location in Costa Rica
- Coordinates: 9.9325767°N 83.9693953°W
- Country: Costa Rica
- Province: Cartago
- Canton: La Unión

Area
  - Total: 8.35 km^{2} (3.22 sq mi)
- Elevation: 1,445 m (4,741 ft)

Population (2011)
  - Total: 7,893
  - Density: 945/km^{2} (2,450/sq mi)
- Time zone: UTC−06:00
- Postal code: 30306

Dulce Nombre is a district of the La Unión canton, in the Cartago province of Costa Rica.

== Geography ==
Dulce Nombre has an area of 8.35 km² and an elevation of 1,445 metres.

== Demographics ==
Historical population
Census	Pop.	±% p.a.
1883	245	—
1892	367	+4.59%
1927	483	+0.79%
1950	696	+1.60%
1963	1,312	+5.00%
1973	2,120	+4.92%
1984	3,734	+5.28%
2000	6,598	+3.62%
2011	7,893	+1.64%
2022	7,177	−0.86%
Source: Instituto Nacional de Estadística y Censos; Centro Centroamericano de Población

For the 2011 census, Dulce Nombre had a population of 7,893 inhabitants.

== Transportation ==
=== Road transportation ===
The district is covered by the following road routes:

- National Route 202
- National Route 221
