= Universidad San Juan de la Cruz =

- Other names: San Juan de la Cruz University
- Established: 1996
- Location: San José, Costa Rica, Costa Rica
- Website: www.sjdlc-university.ac

Universidad San Juan de la Cruz, also known as San Juan de la Cruz University, is a private university located in Costa Rica. It is authorized and accredited by the Consejo Nacional de Enseñanza Superior Universitaria Privada, the national council of higher education of Costa Rica. It has been authorized to award degrees in accounting and business administration since 1996, and in law since 1998.
