= Pacífico railway station =

Railway station in Costa Rica

Pacífico railway station Estación de Ferrocarril al Pacífico
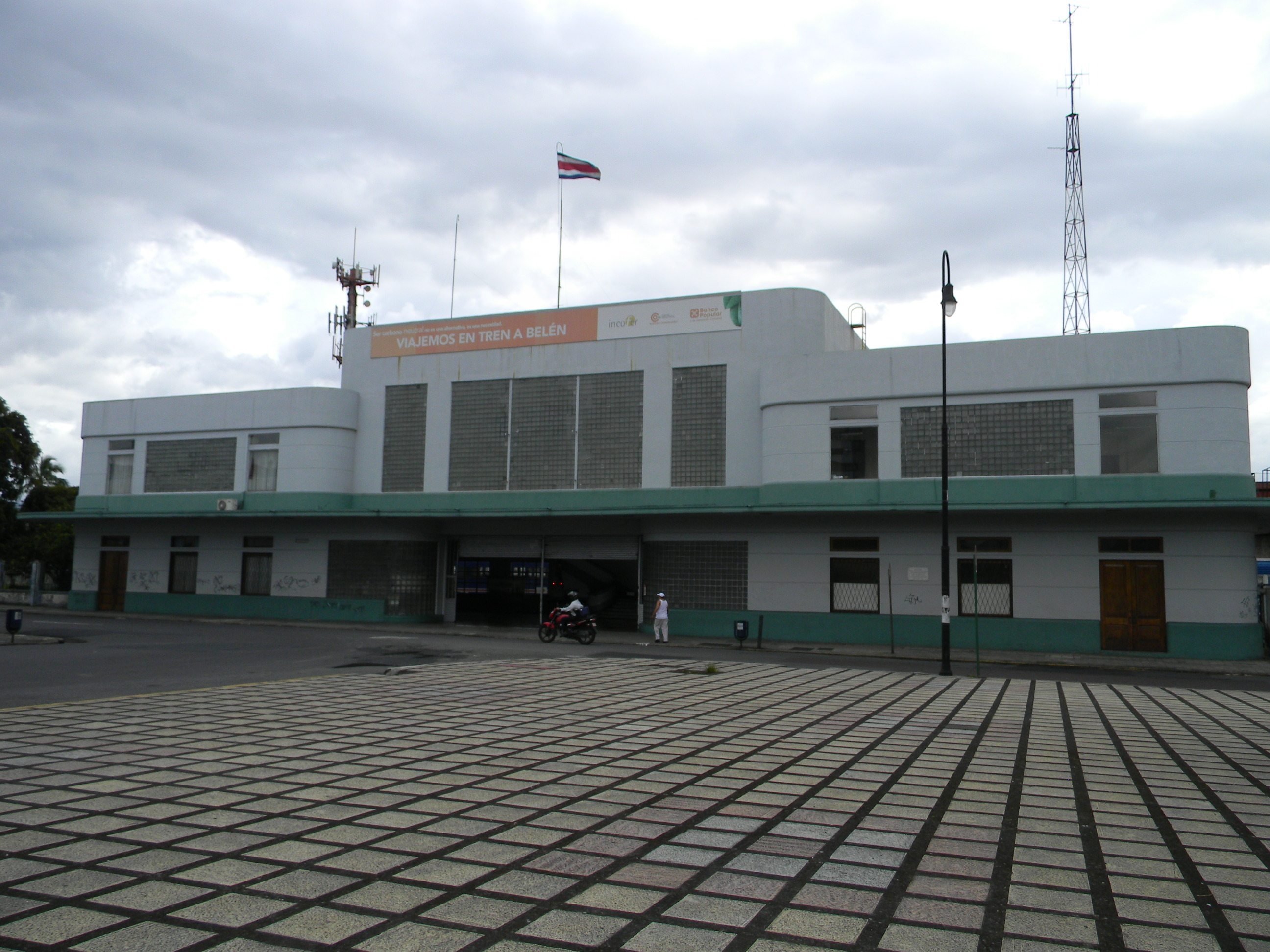
- Pacífico station seen from the park across the street.

General information
- Location: Calle Enrique Echandi y Calle Alfredo Volio, Avenida República de Panamá; San José; Costa Rica
- Coordinates: 9.92547°N 84.08101°W
- Operator: Incofer
- Line: Interurbano
Location

Pacífico railway station (Spanish: Estación de Ferrocarril al Pacífico), is a railway station, managed by Incofer, located in Hospital district, San José canton in Costa Rica. It holds the main office of the Incofer railway operator.

The main building was built in 1941 with functionalism architecture design, there is a wide lobby in the entrance with prominent staircases at both sides. It is an Historic Interest building since 26 November 1997.

== See also ==
- Rail transport in Costa Rica
- Interurbano Line
