= San Diego District =

District in La Unión canton, Cartago province, Costa Rica

San Diego
- District
- San Diego district
- San Diego district location in Costa Rica
- Coordinates: 9.8921182°N 83.994738°W
- Country: Costa Rica
- Province: Cartago
- Canton: La Unión

Area
  - Total: 8.01 km^{2} (3.09 sq mi)
- Elevation: 1,270 m (4,170 ft)

Population (2011)
  - Total: 21,620
  - Density: 2,700/km^{2} (6,990/sq mi)
- Time zone: UTC−06:00
- Postal code: 30302

San Diego is a district of the La Unión canton, in the Cartago province of Costa Rica.

== Geography ==
San Diego has an area of 8.01 km² and an elevation of 1,270 metres.

== Demographics ==
Historical population
| Census | Pop. | ±% p.a. |
|---|---|---|
| 1883 | 527 | — |
| 1892 | 802 | +4.78% |
| 1927 | 850 | +0.17% |
| 1950 | 1,451 | +2.35% |
| 1963 | 2,581 | +4.53% |
| 1973 | 2,797 | +0.81% |
| 1984 | 6,256 | +7.59% |
| 2000 | 16,595 | +6.29% |
| 2011 | 21,620 | +2.43% |
| 2022 | 22,714 | +0.45% |
Source: Instituto Nacional de Estadística y Censos; Centro Centroamericano de Población

For the 2011 census, San Diego had a population of 21,620 inhabitants.

== Transportation ==
=== Road transportation ===
The district is covered by the following road routes:

- National Route 2
- National Route 409
