= Concepción District, La Unión =

District in La Unión canton, Cartago province, Costa Rica

Concepción
- District
- Interactive map of Concepción
- Concepción district location in Costa Rica
- Coordinates: 9.9235661°N 83.9911201°W
- Country: Costa Rica
- Province: Cartago
- Canton: La Unión

Area
  - Total: 3.8 km^{2} (1.5 sq mi)
- Elevation: 1,350 m (4,430 ft)

Population (2011)
  - Total: 16,515
  - Density: 4,300/km^{2} (11,000/sq mi)
- Time zone: UTC−06:00
- Postal code: 30305

Concepción is a district of the La Unión canton, in the Cartago province of Costa Rica.

== Geography ==
Concepción has an area of 3.8 km² and an elevation of 1,350 metres.

== Demographics ==
Historical population
Census	Pop.	±% p.a.
1883	433	—
1892	552	+2.73%
1927	706	+0.71%
1950	820	+0.65%
1963	1,550	+5.02%
1973	3,846	+9.51%
1984	6,638	+5.09%
2000	12,910	+4.25%
2011	16,515	+2.26%
2022	17,755	+0.66%
Source: Instituto Nacional de Estadística y Censos; Centro Centroamericano de Población

For the 2011 census, Concepción had a population of 16,515 inhabitants.

== Transportation ==
=== Road transportation ===
The district is covered by the following road routes:

- National Route 202
- National Route 221
