= Sabanilla District, Montes de Oca =

District in Montes de Oca canton, San José province, Costa Rica

Sabanilla
- District
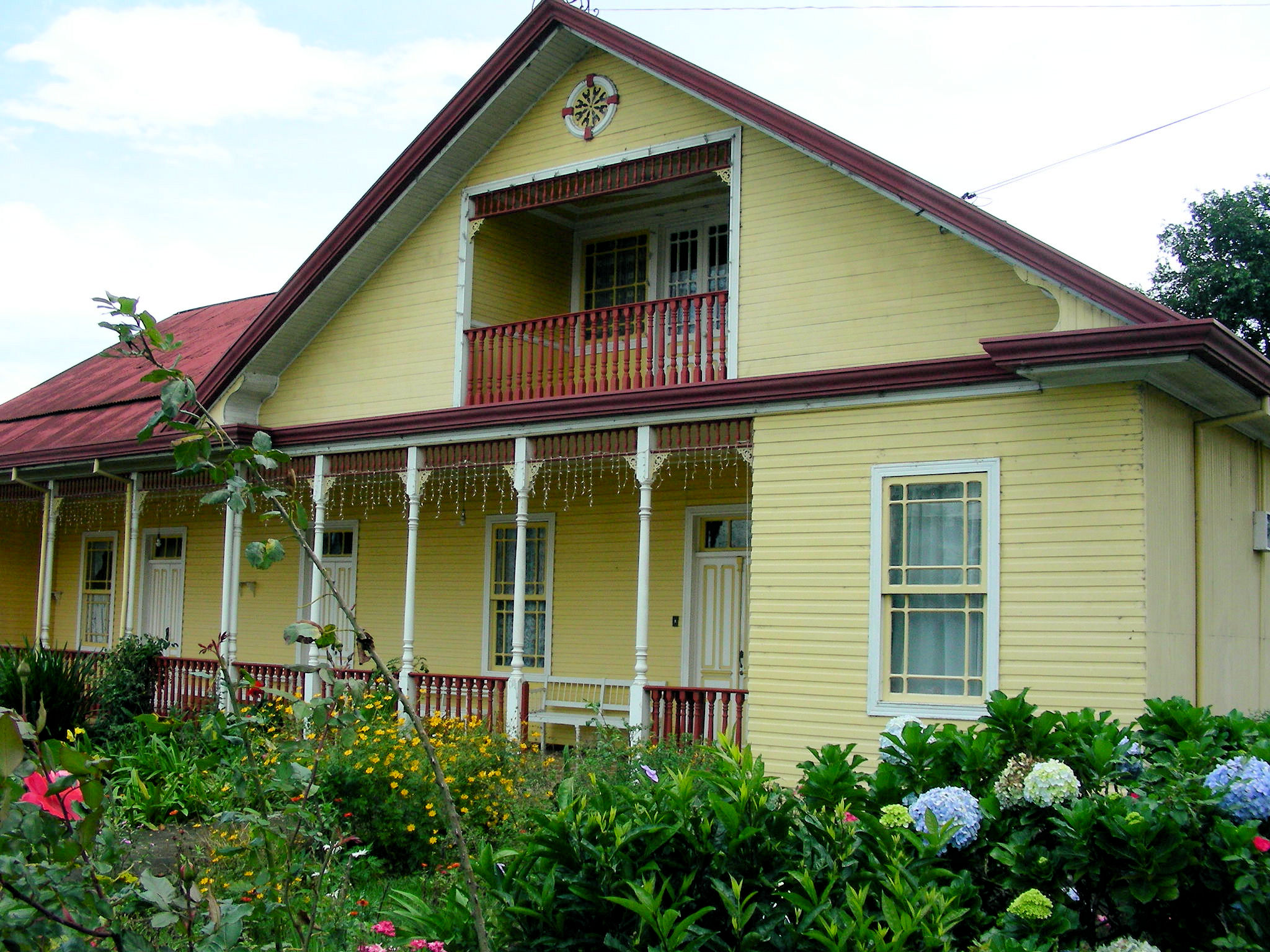
- Wood house in Sabanilla.
- Sabanilla district
- Sabanilla district location in Costa Rica
- Coordinates: 9.9431284°N 84.0332456°W
- Country: Costa Rica
- Province: San José
- Canton: Montes de Oca

Area
  - Total: 1.78 km^{2} (0.69 sq mi)
- Elevation: 1,305 m (4,281 ft)

Population (2011)
  - Total: 10,775
  - Density: 6,050/km^{2} (15,700/sq mi)
- Time zone: UTC−06:00
- Postal code: 11502

Sabanilla is a district of the Montes de Oca canton, in the San José province of Costa Rica.

== Toponymy ==
Sabanilla comes from the root word sabana, which translates as savanna and the diminutive suffix -illa, therefore the meaning becomes little savanna, a small area without a thick tree canopy.

== History ==
By the end of the 19th century, finishes the construction of the Iglesia San Ramón Nonato, it was a work promoted by a visit to the coffee producing town by Monsignor Bernardo Augusto Thiel, second bishop of Costa Rica between 1880 and 1991.

On August 2, 1915, the Montes de Oca canton is founded by law decree 45, under the Alfredo González Flores administration. On April 24, 1977, Franz Hinkelammert established in Sabanilla the Departamento Ecuménico de Investigaciones (DEI), which is visited annually by many liberation theologians and community culture workers from all the Latin American region.

== Geography ==
Sabanilla has an area of 1.78 km^{2} and an elevation of 1,305 metres.

== Locations ==
There are many residential projects completed:

- Barrio Arboledas
- Barrio Cedros
- Barrio Damiana
- Barrio El Rodeo
- Barrio Emmanuel
- Barrio Españolita
- Barrio Frutos Umaña
- Barrio La Familia
- Barrio Luciana
- Barrio Málaga
- Barrio Maravilla
- Barrio Marsella
- Barrio Paso Real
- Barrio Prado
- Barrio Rosales
- Barrio Sabanilla (downtown of the district)
- Barrio San Marino
- Barrio Toscana
- Barrio Tulin

== Demographics ==
Historical population
Census	Pop.	±% p.a.
1927	1,194	—
1950	1,178	−0.06%
1963	2,447	+5.78%
1973	3,475	+3.57%
1984	6,762	+6.24%
2000	11,324	+3.28%
2011	10,775	−0.45%
2022	11,712	+0.76%
Source: Instituto Nacional de Estadística y Censos; Centro Centroamericano de Población

For the 2011 census, Sabanilla had a population of 10,775 inhabitants.

== Transportation ==
=== Road transportation ===
The district is covered by the following road routes:

- National Route 202
- National Route 203
