= San Pedro, Costa Rica =

District in Montes de Oca canton, San José province, Costa Rica

San Pedro
- District
- San Pedro district
- San Pedro district location in Costa Rica
- Coordinates: 9.9331667°N 84.0469973°W
- Country: Costa Rica
- Province: San José
- Canton: Montes de Oca

Area
  - Total: 4.7 km^{2} (1.8 sq mi)
- Elevation: 1,205 m (3,953 ft)

Population (2011)
  - Total: 23,977
  - Density: 5,100/km^{2} (13,000/sq mi)
- Time zone: UTC−06:00
- Postal code: 11501

San Pedro is a district of the Montes de Oca canton, in the San José province of Costa Rica.

== Geography ==
San Pedro has an area of 4.7 km^{2} and an elevation of 1,205 metres.

== Demographics ==
Historical population
Census	Pop.	±% p.a.
1883	764	—
1892	2,691	+15.02%
1927	2,069	−0.75%
1950	6,413	+5.04%
1963	17,342	+7.95%
1973	23,721	+3.18%
1984	24,519	+0.30%
2000	26,524	+0.49%
2011	23,977	−0.91%
2022	23,774	−0.08%
Source: Instituto Nacional de Estadística y Censos; Centro Centroamericano de Población

For the 2011 census, San Pedro had a population of 23,977 inhabitants.

== Locations ==
The district is home to the University of Costa Rica, Universidad Latina de Costa Rica, and other institutions of higher learning.

The San Pedro district has experienced significant residential and commercial development growth, with modern commercial buildings gradually replacing the once-quiet suburbs, a testament to its rapid urbanization.

Barrios (neighborhoods): Alhambra, Azáleas, Carmiol, Cedral, Dent (part), Francisco Peralta (part), Fuentes, Granja, Kezia, Lourdes, Monterrey, Nadori, Oriente, Pinto, Prados del Este, Roosevelt, San Gerardo (part), Santa Marta, Saprissa, Vargas Araya, Yoses

== Transportation ==
=== Road transportation ===
The following road routes cover the district:

- National Route 2
- National Route 39
- National Route 202
- National Route 203
- National Route 306

=== Rail transportation ===
The San Pedro district benefits from the Interurbano Line, a key rail service operated by Incofer. This service provides convenient and efficient transportation options for the district's residents and visitors.
