= San Ramón District, La Unión =

District in La Unión canton, Cartago province, Costa Rica

San Ramón
- District
- San Ramón district
- San Ramón district location in Costa Rica
- Coordinates: 9.9372874°N 83.9886681°W
- Country: Costa Rica
- Province: Cartago
- Canton: La Unión

Area
  - Total: 3.47 km^{2} (1.34 sq mi)
- Elevation: 1,440 m (4,720 ft)

Population (2011)
  - Total: 4,054
  - Density: 1,170/km^{2} (3,030/sq mi)
- Time zone: UTC−06:00
- Postal code: 30307

San Ramón is a district of the La Unión canton, in the Cartago province of Costa Rica.

== Geography ==
San Ramón has an area of 3.47 km^{2} and an elevation of 1,440 metres.

== Demographics ==
Historical population
Census	Pop.	±% p.a.
1883	128	—
1892	316	+10.56%
1927	231	−0.89%
1950	512	+3.52%
1963	1,191	+6.71%
1973	1,805	+4.25%
1984	2,505	+3.02%
2000	4,640	+3.93%
2011	4,054	−1.22%
2022	4,639	+1.23%
Source: Instituto Nacional de Estadística y Censos; Centro Centroamericano de Población

For the 2011 census, San Ramón had a population of 4,054 inhabitants.

== Transportation ==
=== Road transportation ===
The district is covered by the following road routes:

- National Route 202

== Economy ==
One of its main economic activities is the plantation of cypress, used as Christmas trees in Costa Rica. Along with its immediate neighbors San Rafael District and Mata de Plátano District, it forms one of the main cypress production areas in all the Costa Rican Central Region.
