= Interurbano Line (Costa Rica) =

Railway line in Costa Rica

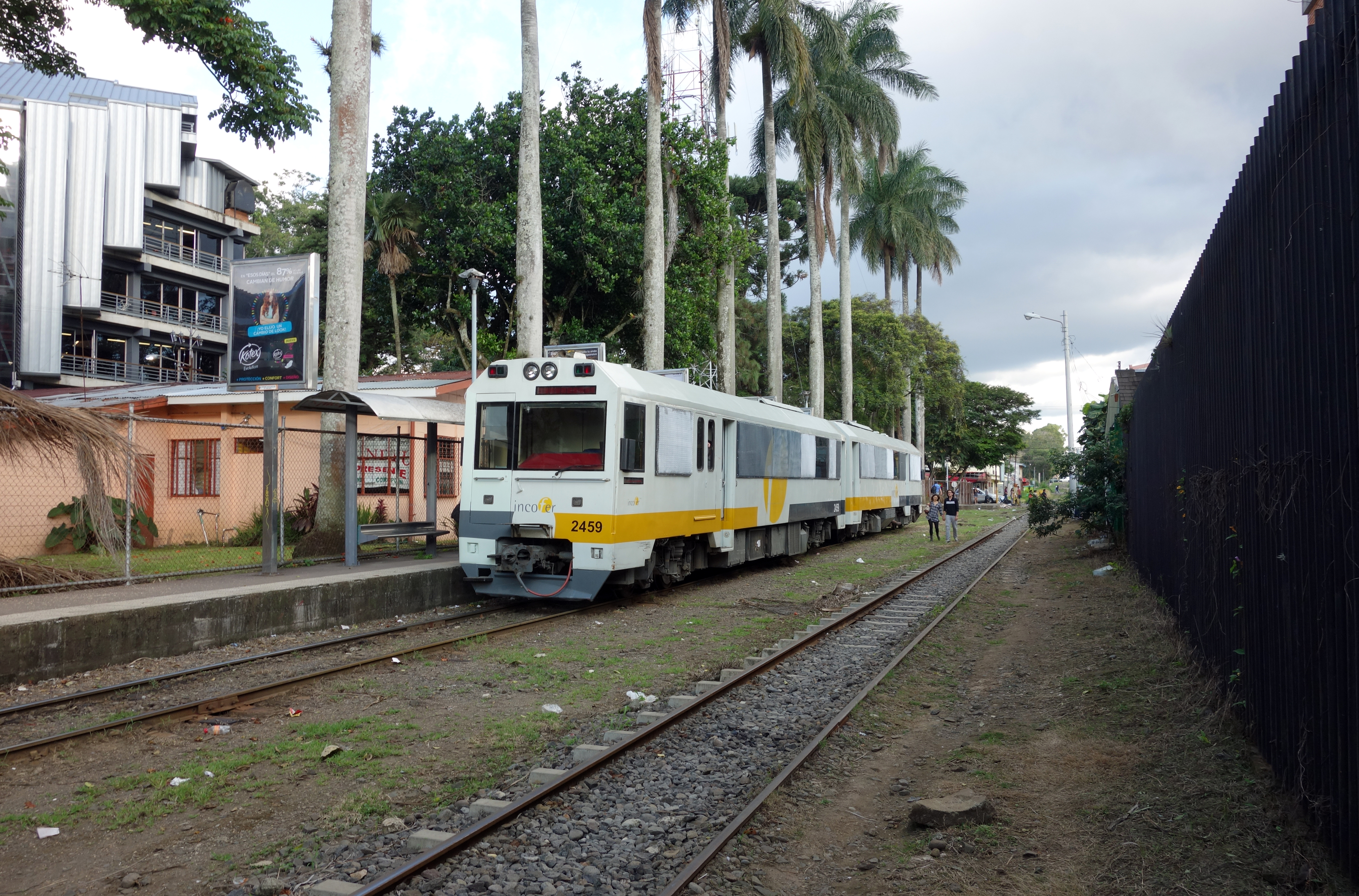
- Train making a stop at Universidad de Costa Rica (UCR) platform.

Overview
- Native name: Tren Interurbano
- Owner: Incofer
- Locale: Greater Metropolitan Area, Costa Rica
- Stations: 32

Service
- Type: Commuter rail
- Operator: Incofer

Technical
- Track gauge: 1,067 mm (3 ft 6 in)
- Electrification: No
Route map

Interurbano Line (Spanish: Tren Interurbano), is a commuter railway line in Costa Rica, operated by the national public railway operator Incofer. The line connects the provinces of Alajuela, Heredia, San José, and Cartago.

== History ==
Costa Rica had two main lines for freight and passenger transportation, the Pacific line (between San José and Puntarenas) and the Atlantic line (between Alajuela, through Heredia and San José to Limón), both of which converge in the San José canton, with the eponymous terminus station of each line a mere 2 kilometer apart, which are connected by rail.

Between 1993 and 1995 a brief passenger service made use of the tracks, but it was not enough to keep Incofer working, as the institution have been running in a deficit for a long time, for which it was technically closed in 1995.

Incofer then recreated the Interurbano as a commuter single line making use of this available infrastructure.

The initial train line was between Pavas and Montes de Oca, in 2005.

In 2008 the announcement of extending the line to Heredia started works on cleaning up the old line, trial runs were executed with derails being common, the initial service of the current rebooted Interurbano was between the Atlántico station and Heredia station, which started on 2009. New rolling stock from Spain, the Apolo 2400 units, were imported in 2009.

=== Future ===
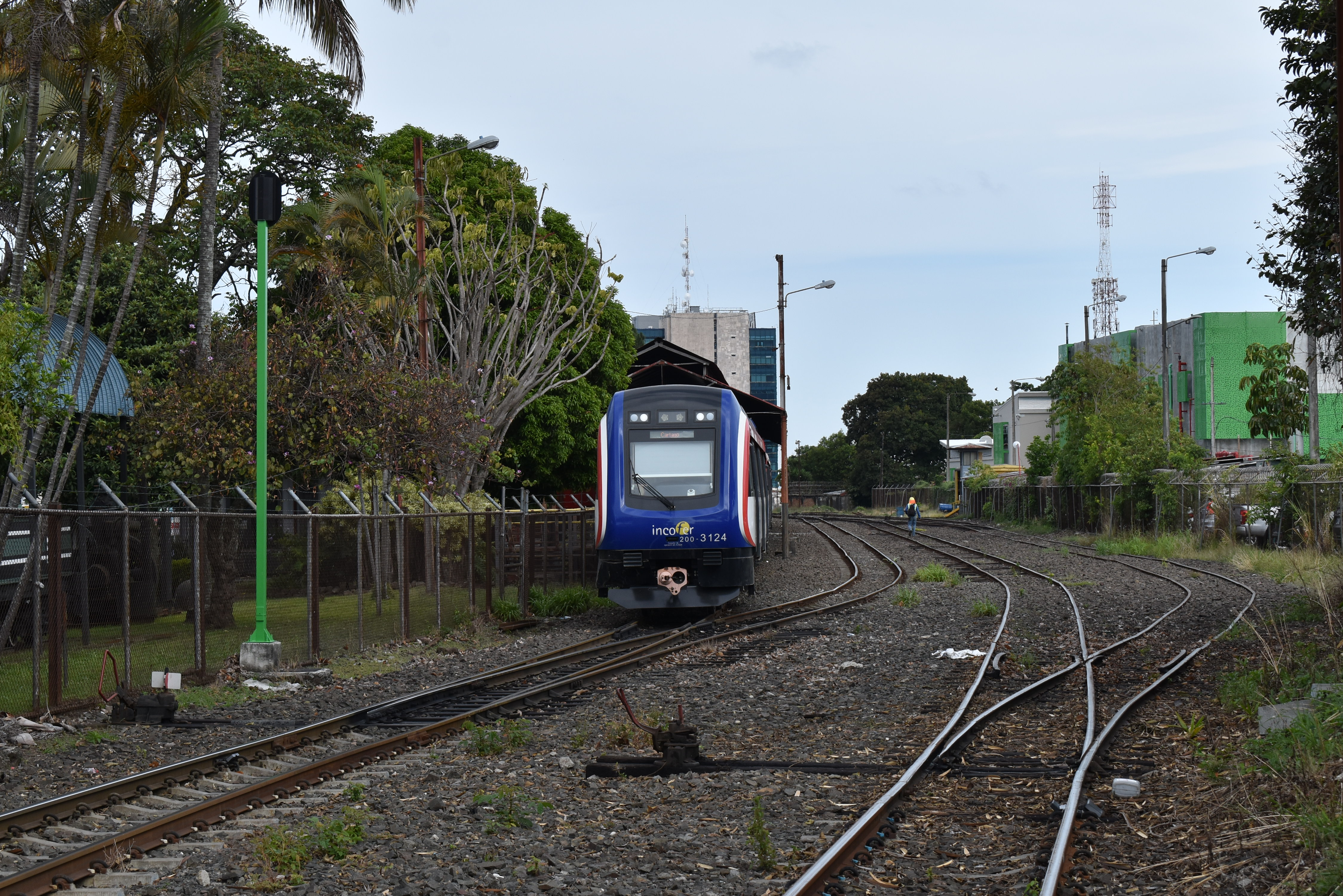
New DMU from CRRC

There are plans to reconstruct the whole passenger line with an electric railroad, including elevated segments to improve the vehicular road flow, with forty-six stations (five would be elevated, the remaining thirty-seven at ground level), and service every three to five minutes, under the Sistema de Transporte Rápido de Personas (Fast Passenger Transportation System) project.

==== Stage Zero of electrification ====
New plans to electrify the passenger lines are in place, beginning with a "Stage Zero" which means to start with new more efficient diesel powered rolling stock. These eight new units were ordered from the Chinese company CRRC Qingdao Sifang; they will have more space and the seats are arranged along the walls of the units, a first in the country.

With the new units it will be possible to extend and provide the service to Paraíso, Cartago and San Rafael, Alajuela.

A projected start date for a bidirectional electric railway line is set for around the year 2025, with bidding offers starting in 2022.

== Line data ==
The line is operated at street level, which makes it difficult to achieve an optimum speed due to frequent encounters with busy streets, at average the speed is at about 20 km/h (12 mph).

From its reopening the train crossings at street level didn't have barriers, bells or any other security measure; despite a lot of honking accidents between the train and cars are common, as well as accidents with pedestrians, in 2018 security measures were installed at 45 crossings, with plans to grow to 136, but vandalism and accidents against the barriers are common.

Street running trains are common in several places; the track(s), As well as some stations lay directly in/on (the middle of) the narrow streets.

== Services ==
There are three services running on the Interurbano line, all of them use the same rolling stock interchangeably, and the range of a service might include part of another. There is no express services, all stops are served.

=== Cartago ===
Making use of the old railroad line to the Atlantic, the line finished in Los Ángeles neighborhood of Cartago as of October 2019, but by May 2023 was extended to Oreamuno, with plans to continue towards Paraíso. Shaded stops are only served at rush hour.

Name	Distance	Station Type	Other services	District, Canton
Atlántico	0.00 km (0 mi)	building, staffed	Belén-Pavas–Curridabat, Alajuela-Río Segundo-Heredia-San José	Carmen, San José
UCR	1.94 km (1.21 mi)	platform	Belén-Pavas–Curridabat	San Pedro, Montes de Oca
ULatina	2.88 km (1.79 mi)	platform	Belén-Pavas–Curridabat	San Pedro, Montes de Oca
CFIA	3.78 km (2.35 mi)	platform	Belén-Pavas–Curridabat	Curridabat, Curridabat
UACA	5.72 km (3.55 mi)	platform		Sánchez, Curridabat
Tres Ríos	10.21 km (6.34 mi)	platform		Tres Ríos, La Unión
Cartago	20.52 km (12.75 mi)	building, staffed		Occidental, Cartago
Los Ángeles (Basílica)	21.76 km (13.52 mi)	platform		Oriental, Cartago
Oreamuno	24.26 km (15.07 mi)	platform with shops		San Rafael, Oreamuno

==== Planned extension ====
Railway tracks clearing and recovery, as well as new bridges and infrastructure is under construction for extending the Cartago service to Paraiso.

Name	Distance	Station Type	Other services	District, Canton
Paraíso	2.80 km (1.74 mi) east of Los Ángeles platform.	abandoned station building		Paraíso, Paraíso

=== Belén-Pavas–Curridabat ===
Using the railroad line to the Pacific, with a small segment of the line to the Atlantic. Shaded stops are only served at rush hour.

Name	Milepost		Station Type	Other services	District	Canton
Name	km	mi	Station Type	Other services	District	Canton
Belén	0.00	0.00	building, staffed		San Antonio	Belén
Pedregal	0.98	0.61	platform		San Antonio	Belén
Metrópoli	4.88	3.03	platform		Pavas	San José
Demasa	5.85	3.64	platform		Pavas	San José
Pecosa	6.78	4.21	platform		Pavas	San José
Pavas Centro	7.77	4.83	platform		Pavas	San José
Jacks	8.97	5.57	platform		Pavas	San José
Tubo Tico (AyA)	9.54	5.93	platform		Pavas	San José
La Salle	10.85	6.74	platform		Mata Redonda	San José
Contraloría	11.74	7.29	platform		Mata Redonda	San José
Cementerio	13.08	8.13	platform		Hospital	San José
Pacífico	14.41	8.95	building, staffed		Hospital	San José
Plaza Víquez	15.15	9.41	platform		Catedral	San José
La Corte	15.91	9.89	platform		Catedral	San José
Atlántico	17.94	11.15	building, staffed	Cartago, Alajuela-Río Segundo-Heredia-San José	Carmen	San José
UCR	19.88	12.35	platform	Cartago, Alajuela-Río Segundo-Heredia-San José	San Pedro	Montes de Oca
ULatina	20.82	12.94	platform	Cartago, Alajuela-Río Segundo-Heredia-San José	San Pedro	Montes de Oca
CFIA	21.72	13.50	platform	Cartago	Curridabat	Curridabat

==== Planned extension ====
Railway tracks clearing and recovery is under way to provide access to this stop in the Belén-Pavas–Curridabat service.

Name	Milepost		Station Type	Other services	District	Canton
Name	km	mi	Station Type	Other services	District	Canton
San Rafael, Ojo de Agua	4.26	2.65	abandoned station building		San Rafael	Alajuela
San Rafael, Ojo de Agua	west of Belén station		abandoned station building		San Rafael	Alajuela

=== Alajuela-Río Segundo-Heredia-San José ===
Uses the segment from Alajuela through Heredia toward the Atlantic station. Darker shaded stops are only served at rush hour.

Name	Distance	Station Type	Other services	District, Canton
Alajuela	0.00 km (0 mi)	platform		Alajuela, Alajuela
Bulevar Aeropuerto	2.09 km (1.30 mi)	platform		Río Segundo, Alajuela
Río Segundo	3.40 km (2.11 mi)	platform		Río Segundo, Alajuela
San Joaquín	7.14 km (4.44 mi)	platform		San Joaquín, Flores
San Francisco	9.84 km (6.11 mi)	platform		San Francisco, Heredia
Heredia	11.24 km (6.98 mi)	building, staffed		Heredia, Heredia
Miraflores	12.61 km (7.84 mi)	platform		Rincón de Sabanilla, San Pablo
Santa Rosa	14.69 km (9.13 mi)	platform		Santa Rosa, Santo Domingo
Colima	16.94 km (10.53 mi)	platform		Colima, Tibás
Calle Blancos	19.22 km (11.94 mi)	platform		Calle Blancos, Goicoechea
Atlántico	20.86 km (12.96 mi)	building, staffed	Cartago, Belén-Pavas–Curridabat	Carmen, San José
UCR	22.80 km (14.17 mi)	platform	Cartago, Belén-Pavas–Curridabat	San Pedro, Montes de Oca
ULatina	23.74 km (14.75 mi)	platform	Cartago, Belén-Pavas–Curridabat	San Pedro, Montes de Oca

== Rolling stock ==
The lines runs on diesel locomotives and units:

- Serie 2400 de Renfe, from Renfe Operadora, Spain.
- GE Universal 11B
- Some of the passenger cars were built in the country by COOPESA.

== See also ==
- Rail transport in Costa Rica
