= Rail transport in Costa Rica =

- Rail network right-of-way of Costa Rica Tren Interurbano Ferrocarril al Pacífico Ferrocarril al Atlántico Banana transportation Ferrocarril del Sur (Quepos) Ferrocarril del Sur (Golfito)

Operation
- Major operators: Instituto Costarricense de Ferrocarriles (Incofer)

System length
- Total: 516.65 km (321.03 mi)

Track gauge
- Main: 1,067 mm (3 ft 6 in)

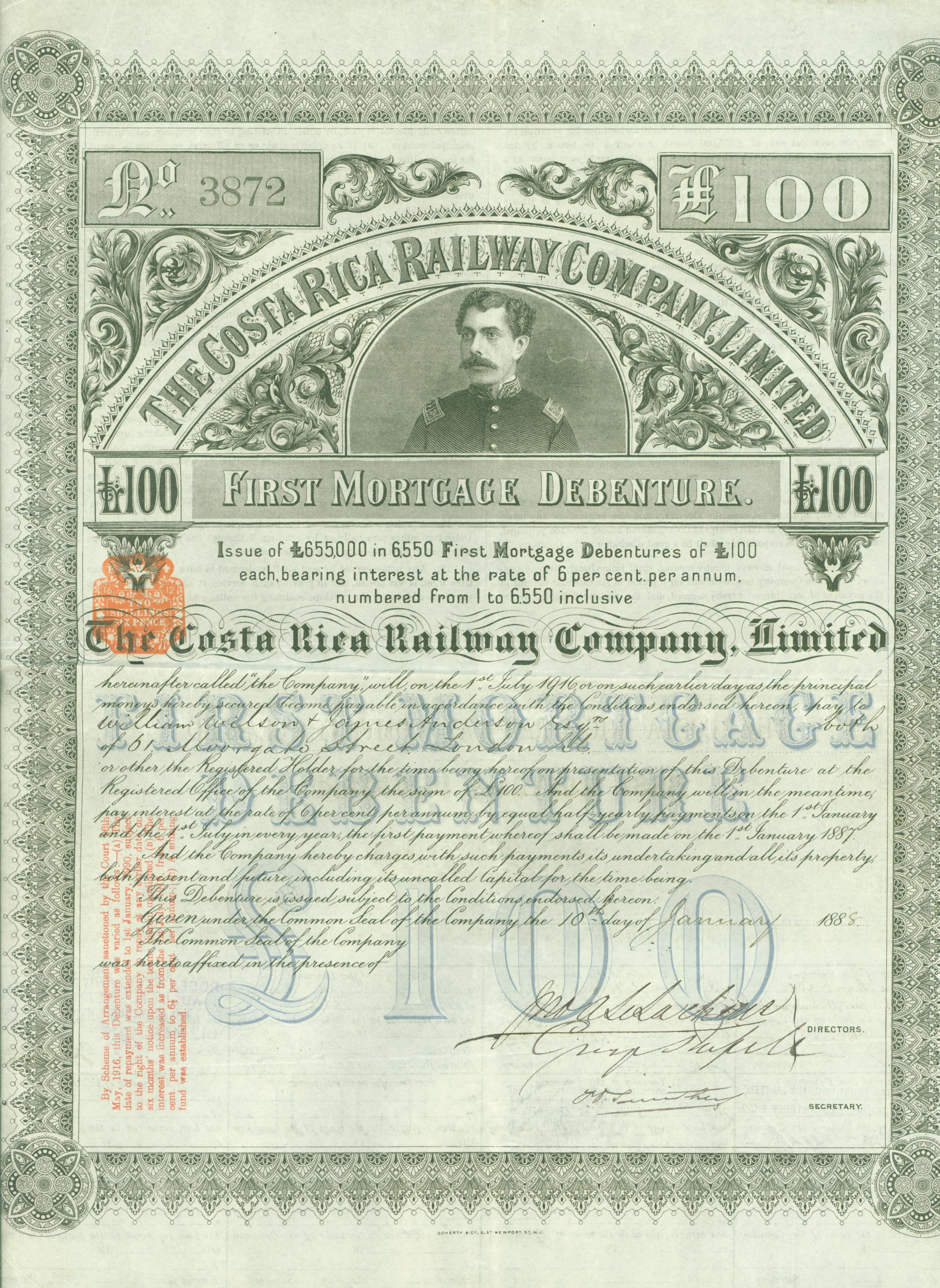
First Mortgage Debenture of the Costa Rica Railway Company Ltd., issued 10 January 1888

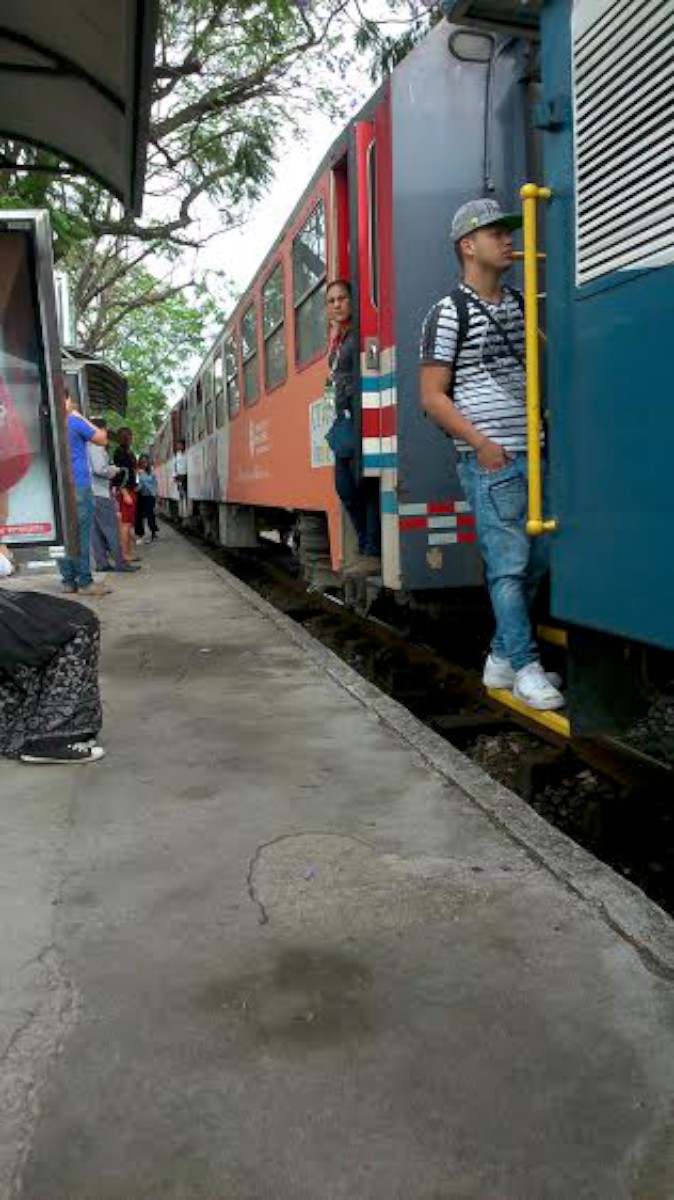
Train arriving into the Sabana-Contraloria station in San Jose.

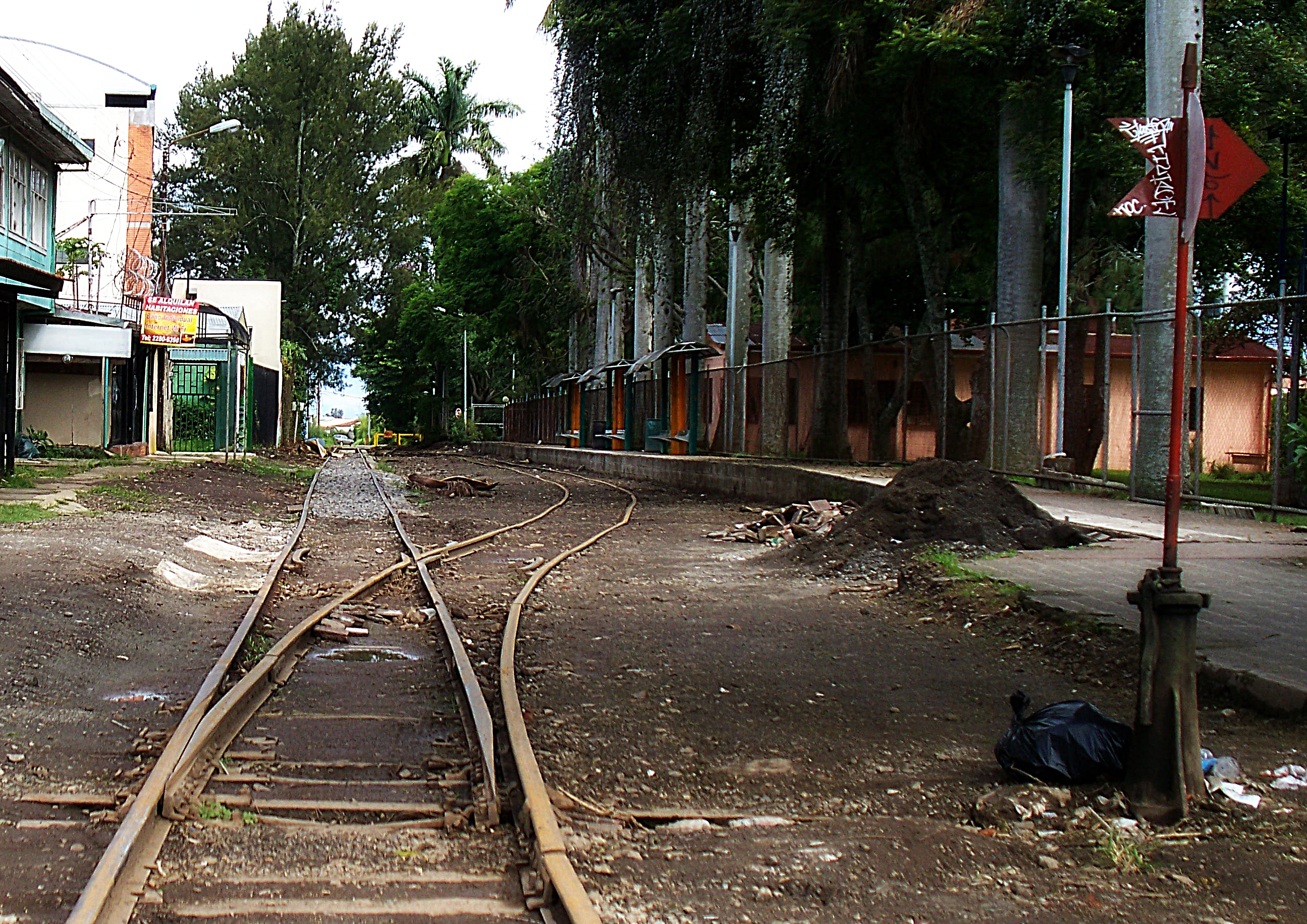
Universidad de Costa Rica station, San Pedro, Montes de Oca

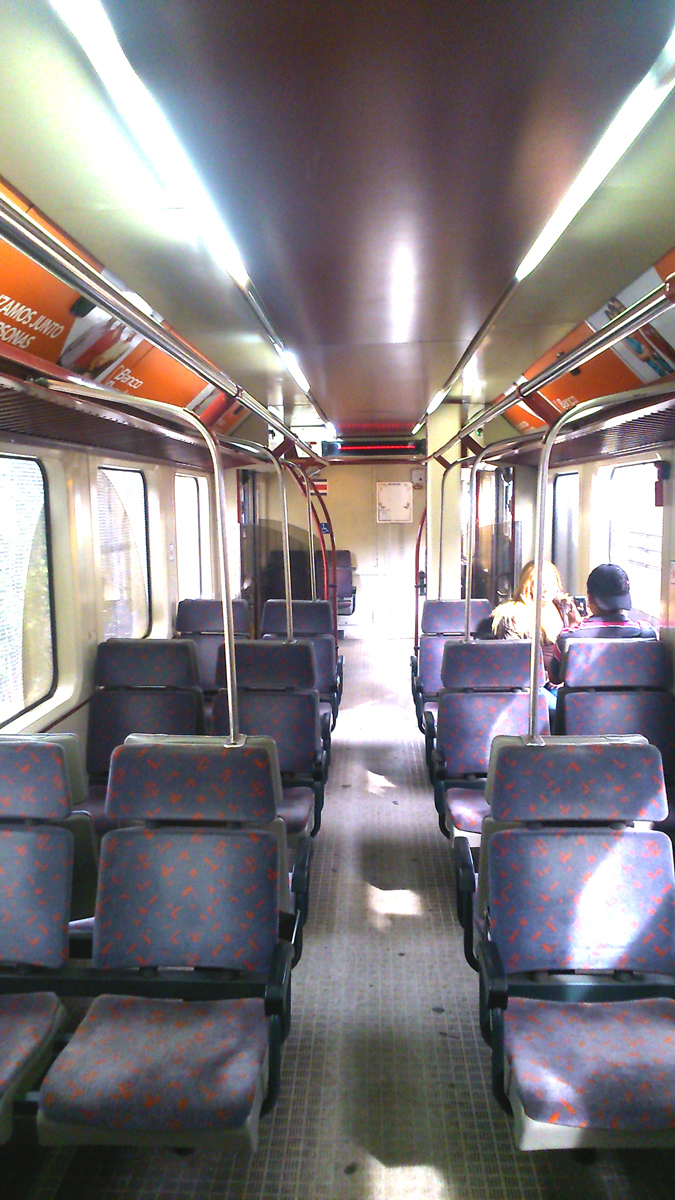
Interior of an Incofer Apolo 2400 type DMU

Rail transport in Costa Rica is primarily under the stewardship of Incofer (Instituto Costarricense de Ferrocarriles), an autonomous institution of the state. Incofer owns the national railway infrastructure and operates virtually all freight and passenger services, which consist primarily of commuter trains through the highly populated Central Valley. The whole Incofer network is 1,067 mm (3 ft 6 in) narrow gauge, although there are small tourist railways of other gauges.

Much of the railway system requires major repairs. An August 2016 OECD report provided this summary about the infrastructure, including the railways:

The road network is extensive but of poor quality, railways are in disrepair and only slowly being reactivated after having been shut down in the 1990s ... Internal transportation overly relies on private road vehicles as the public transport system, especially railways, is inadequate.

== History ==
In 1871, construction was started on a railroad from Alajuela to Puerto Limón, via San José, on the Caribbean coast; the project was initiated by the government of General Tomás Guardia Gutiérrez and was surveyed in 1868 by the British civil engineer Edmund Wragge. The railroad from Alajuela to San José was completed by the beginning of 1873 and later continued until Cartago. Materials and equipment were brought into Alajuela from Puntarenas by oxen-powered carts. Due to a shortage of finances and natural obstacles (especially around Río Sucio), the construction of the remaining sections was delayed, and the entire line did not become operational until December 7, 1890.

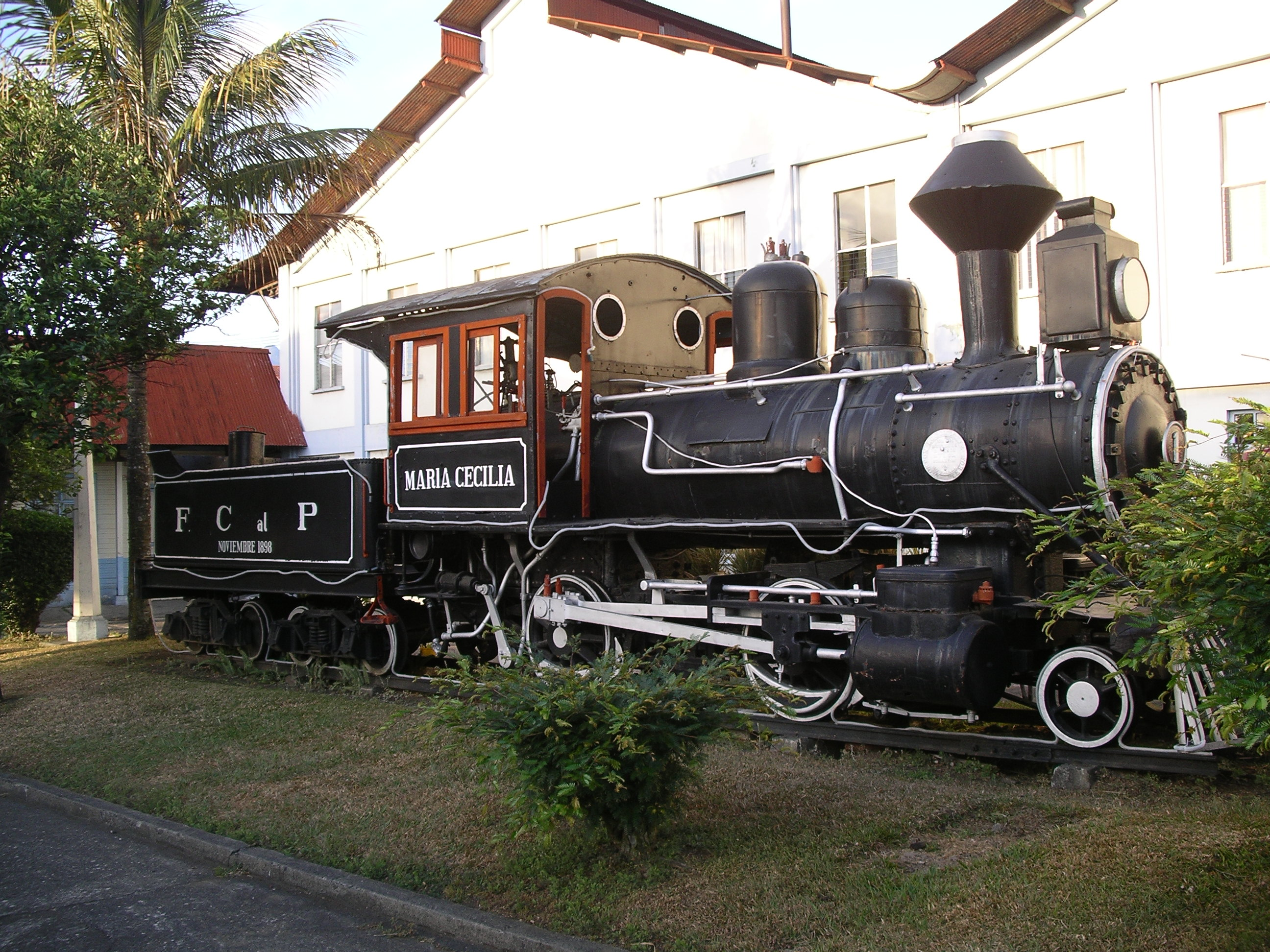
Steam locomotive F.C. al P. no 1 Maria Cecilia in San Jose

A contract for the building of the Pacific Railroad was signed in 1897, but again, the enterprise faced natural, financial and political difficulties. The Pacific Railroad was officially launched on July 23, 1910, when the first Pennsylvania-built steam locomotive, María Cecilia, named after the granddaughter of former President Rafael Iglesias, departed from Puntarenas to San José with passengers and cargo.

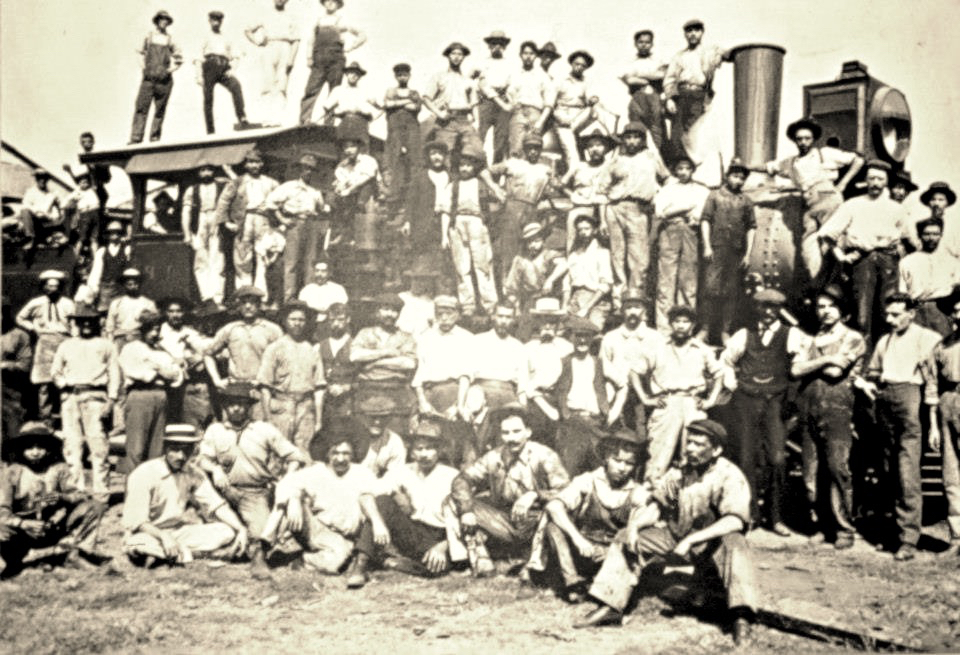
Italians working in a Costa Rica's railway. A few of them remained to live in Costa Rica and their descendants resettled in the San Vito area.

Due to the required hard labor and lack of personnel in the country, workers from Jamaica, Italy and China, immigrated to Costa Rica.

The transcontinental railway from Limón to Puntarenas became operational in 1910 and was central for the connection of the various fertile regions of the country. The route followed the Atlantic coast until the small port of Matina, before it passed inland to Reventazón River. From there the original intention was to run close to Irazú. A more southerly route traversing the Ochomogo Pass was ultimately built. From San José the railway continued onto Alajuela, the small Pacific port of Tivives and Puntarenas. The railroad was jointly owned by the state and the Costa Rica Railway Company, with the latter behind the 1904 arrangement to build several branch lines through the banana districts of the Atlantic littoral.

In 1926, a decision was made to electrify the Pacific line, and the first electric train ran from San José to Puntarenas on April 8, 1930.

The Costa Rican railroad network was damaged during an earthquake in 1991 and its operation was suspended in 1995. Since 2000, Incofer has been working to recommence and popularize rail transport again.

=== Accidents ===
On 14 March 1926, the El Virilla train accident happened on the Atlantic line, in a religious pilgrimage from Heredia to Cartago, out of around a thousand passengers, there were 385 deaths and 93 injured passengers, so far the worst train accident in the country's railroad history.

=== Current status ===
Although it once connected the Caribbean ports of Limón and Moín with the Pacific port of Caldera and the Nicoya Gulf ferries in Puntarenas, traversing the Central Valley area and Costa Rica's largest cities along the route, the system fell into disrepair towards the end of the 20th century following a financial crisis that saw the President of Costa Rica, José María Figueres, order the cessation of Incofer's commercial activity, resulting in the redundancies of most of its workforce except for a select few who were charged with preserving railway assets.

However, operations were never fully suspended, and there was always at least the occasional freight and maintenance traffic along certain parts of the network. Some other parts, on the other hand, were essentially abandoned until 2005 when urban passenger services were reintroduced along a corridor between the suburbs of Pavas, to the west of San José, and San Pedro, to the east. Since then, services have been greatly increased following investment in second-hand DMUs imported from Spain and the rehabilitation of dozens of kilometres of previously inoperative track. As of May 2014, the bulk of railway operations occur in the Central Valley area and consist of passenger services between:

- The San José suburbs of Pavas, Curridabat and Belen.
- San José and the cities of Heredia and Cartago.

As shown in the current (2024) INCOFER schedules, further sections, between Heredia and Alajuela and from Cartago to Paraiso, extended the services existing in 2014.

Trains (particularly freight trains, as well as a privately operated tour train) ran between San José and the port of Caldera until 2011, when a short section of the line was compromised following the construction of Route 27. This prompted a dispute between Incofer and the highway developer, Autopistas del Sol. This dispute has not yet been resolved and Incofer officials have been quoted as saying that while they are technically able to run trains over the damaged section, it is dangerous to do so. The resulting lack of regular traffic on this line has facilitated the theft of rails.

Visitors to Costa Rica may perceive the railway as being somewhat limited compared to other forms of transport, due to the current lack of anything except a basic commuter service.

==== Passenger services ====
While mainly freight lines, there were passenger services to the Pacific since 1910 and to the Caribbean since 1890 from San José, but these were abandoned and under maintained. Only the remnants of the urban areas remain.

==== Freight services ====
- Freight trains San José - Caldera (Incofer)
- Freight trains from Puerto Limón to Fortuna and towards Guápiles, mainly for banana transportation, as from 2007 on steel and construction materials have been added to the freight transported

== Lines ==
Detailed maps of the former routes can be accessed via the guiascostarica.info portal - see External Links below. The talk page for this Wikipedia page lists the maps required.

=== Pacific Railroad ===
The currently abandoned Ferrocarril al Pacífico first started in 1857 by implementing a mule-drawn railroad, between Puntarenas and Barranca, the construction of the current right-of-way occurred from 1895 to 1903, which was halted due to lack of foreign funds and then proceeded with national funds until 1910. From 1926 to 1930, the railroad was converted to electrical, which then changed its name to Pacific Electric Railroad (Ferrocarril Electrico al Pacífico, F.E. al P.). It was in use until 1995. The railroad of this line in the Greater Metropolitan Area was re-purposed to create the Interurbano Line.

=== Atlantic Railroad ===
Works started in 1871 for the Ferrocarril al Atlántico, and ended in 1890, currently the railroad between Cartago and the Caribbean plains is abandoned, but there are steel freight operations on the Caribbean ocean side.

The railroad of this line in the Greater Metropolitan Area was re-purposed to create the Interurbano Line, which covers the East of the Central Valley up to Cartago.

=== Interurbano Line ===
By reconditioning and restoring the railway tracks in the Greater Metropolitan Area, Incofer, the Instituto Costarricense de Ferrocarriles (Costa Rican Railway Institute in English) was able to put into work a commuter line, the Tren Interurbano, which connects the provinces of Alajuela, Heredia, San José and Cartago. There are street running trains in several places.

Incofer runs the following routes (San Jose is the nation's capital):

- San Jose–Cartago
- Curridabat–Pavas–Belén
- San Jose–Heredia–Alejuela

=== Quepos Railroad / Ferrocarril de Quepos (United Fruit) ===
Currently abandoned and dismantled, the Ferrocarril de Quepos was an essential part of the banana production in the Central Pacific coast of the country. The principal route ran from La Palma (northern branch) via Quepos to Portalon (southern branch). Multiple branches served the plantation areas. Right-of-way is now owned by Incofer.

=== Golfito Railroad / Compania Bananera de Costa Rica (United Fruit) ===
Now abandoned, the Ferrocarril de Golfito was used for banana freight transportation. One line ran from Golfito to Coto Junction then north to Palmar Sur. This line was 89 km (55 mi) long. A second line ran from Coto Junction to Puerto Gonzalez where there was a connection with the Chiriquí railway, allowing produce to be exported through Puerto Armuelles in Panama. This line was 39.5 km (24.5 mi) long. Multiple branches served the plantation areas.

Hamlets served included Palmar Sur, Piedras Blancas, Coto 47, Laurel and Golfito. Right-of-way is now owned by Incofer. Several locomotives were cosmetically restored and can be seen in Golfito.

=== Changuinola Railway (United Fruit) ===
This line ran from the Suretka area to Sixaola where it crossed the Sixaola River to reach Guabito in Panama. From there the railway continued to Almirante on the Caribbean coast.

== International connections ==
There were formerly two railway connections between Costa Rica and Panama, both are now closed. There were no connections to Nicaragua.

One connection was on the Golfito Railroad, the second was on the Changuinola Railway. Both were on privately owned and operated plantation networks. The Sixaola bridge on the Changuinola line collapsed in 2017.

In 2018, China donated to Panama a feasibility plan to open a high speed train between Panama and Costa Rica, but by 2019, the plan was rejected.

As of 2020 there are no current or planned connections to Panama or Nicaragua. In 2025, plans were announced for a freight railway to connect Panama and Costa Rica.

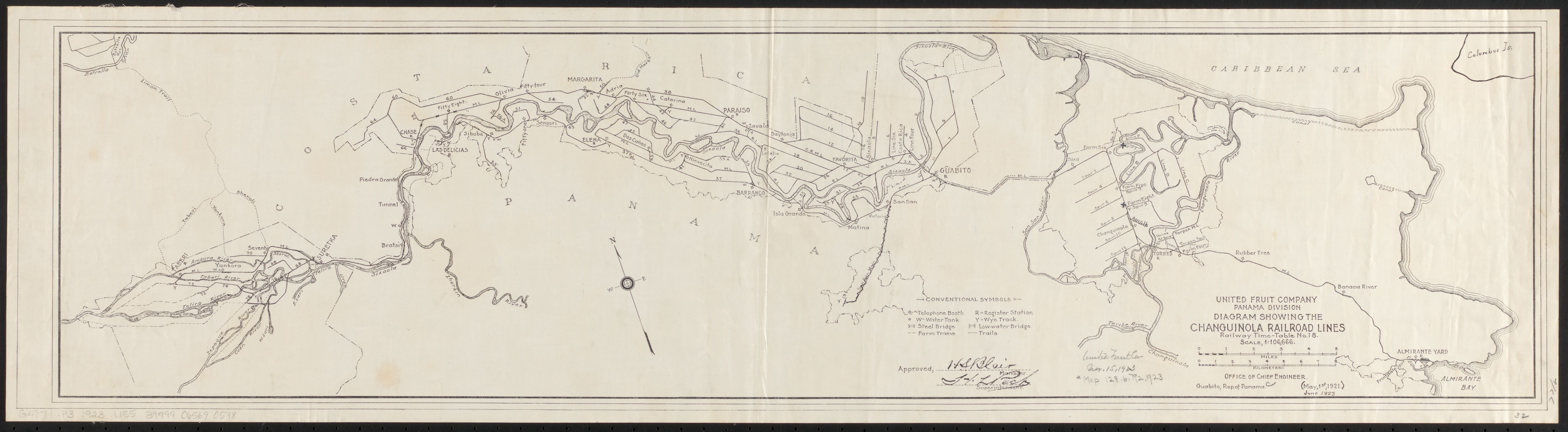
1923 Diagram showing the Changuinola Railroad

== Inter-oceanic Dry Canal ==
There are plans and studies regarding the construction of an inter-oceanic dry canal (Spanish: Canal Seco Interoceánico) across the country, from the Caribbean sea to the Pacific Ocean, through the northern plains of the country, in a similar and parallel route to the Route 4 road. The main way of merchandise transportation would be using railroad to transport container, with plans to build ten road lanes alongside the railroad tracks, two new ports on each coast terminus.

In April 2020 the National Concessions Council (Spanish: Consejo Nacional de Concesiones, CNC) rejected and archived the plans for the dry canal.

== Private railways ==
There are very few private railways, in small loops.

=== Swiss railroad ===
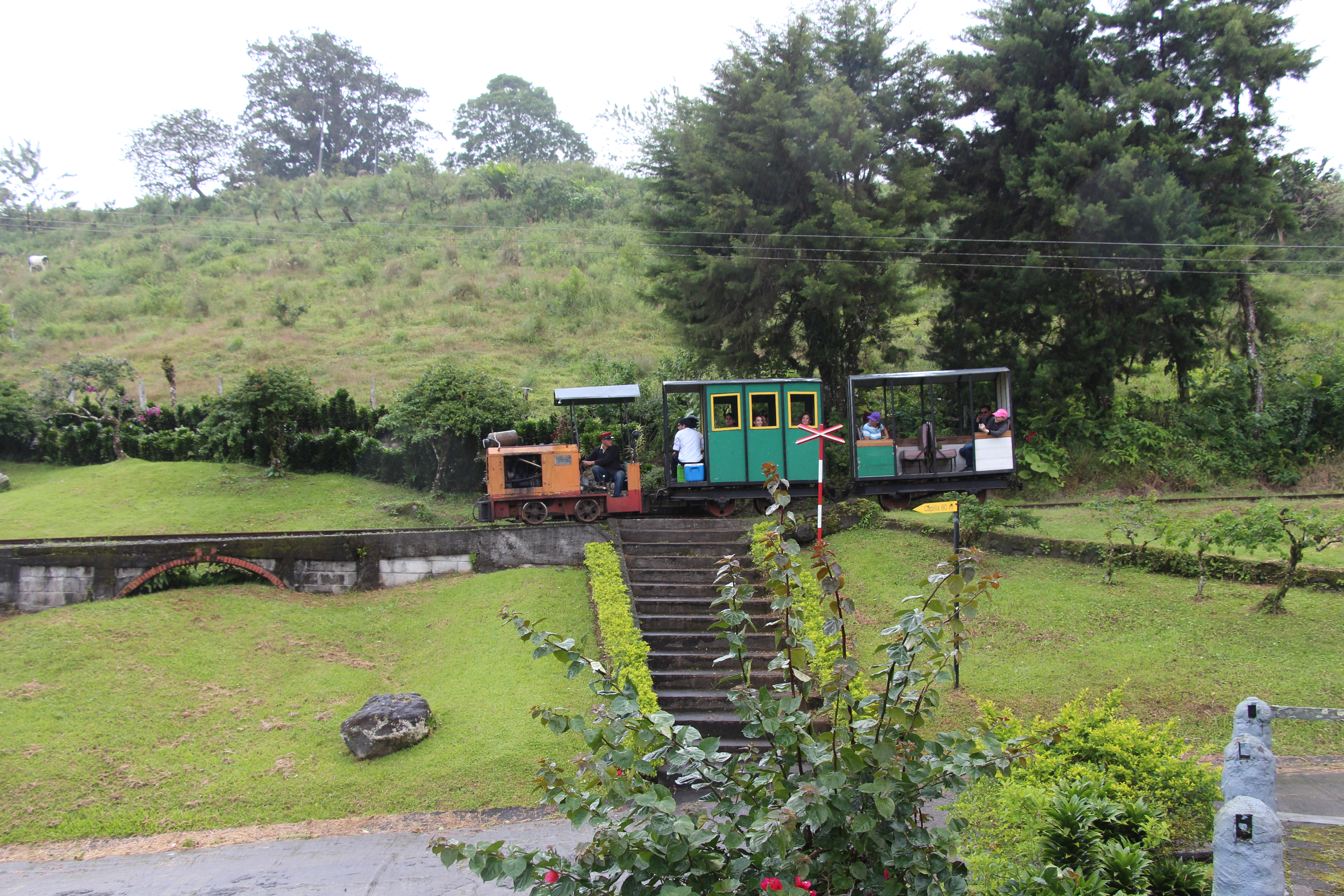
Tren Turistico Arenal

At the Hotel Los Héroes in Nuevo Arenal, Tilarán Canton (Guanacaste Province), a Swiss hotelier has built a mountain railway for the guests of his panorama restaurant, Pequeña Helvecia (little Switzerland). The rolling stock had been originally used by a Swiss farmer from Chéseaux, who built a 600 mm (1 ft 11 5/8 in) field railway but never got a permission to run it. The hotelier bought it in 1999 and put in operation in 2000 as a tourist attraction under the name "Tren Turistico Arenal". As of 2004 and 2017, it is 3.5 km (2.2 mi) long, with an elevation of 200 m (660 ft) and two tunnels.

=== Castillo Country Club ===
Built in the 1970s, this is a small 1.2 kilometer loop railroad with a diesel engine and three passenger cars for family entertainment purposes inside the club. It was built by engineers that previously worked on the rail to the Pacific.

== See also ==
- Costa Rica
- Transportation in Costa Rica
- Rail transport in Central America
- Rail transport by country
- Afro Costa Rican
