= International parrot trade =

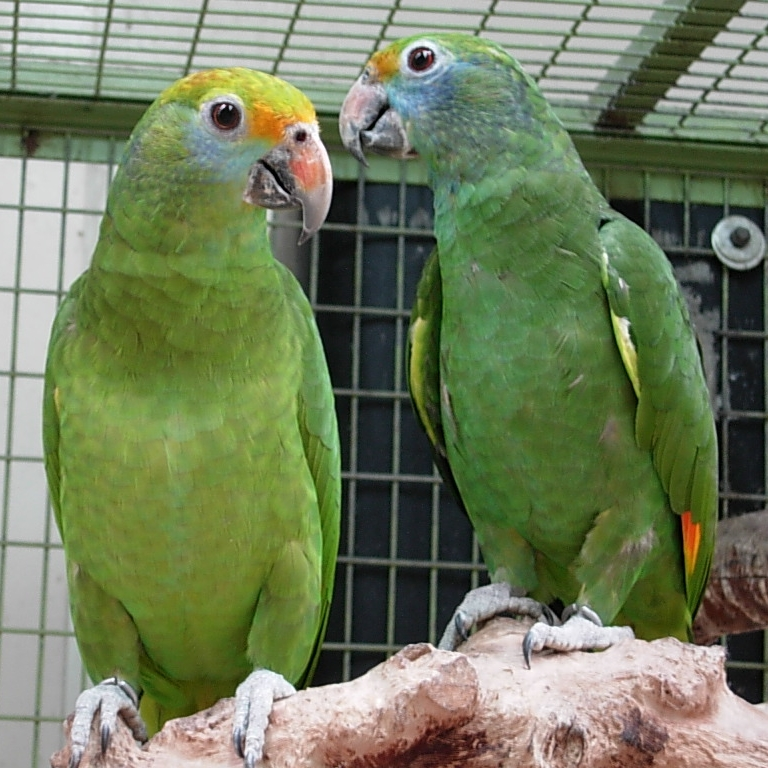
Captive blue-cheeked amazon parrots

The international trade in parrots is a lucrative enterprise, and forms an important part of the international wildlife trade. As parrots have become increasingly endangered, many countries have placed restrictions on the trade and/or prohibited the trade altogether. Despite the restriction on trade in many countries however, the market still operates both legally and illegally. A big factor that attempts to keep the control in international trade is CITES. The Convention of International Trade in Endangered Species of Wildlife Fauna and Flora was established in 1975, and consists of 184 parties which includes 183 countries along with the European Union. CITES offers three different degrees of protection for around 38,000 species around the world.

Approximately 2,600 of the more than 9,600 bird species in existence are subject to trade, and 20% of these species belong to the order Psittaciformes (parrots). In 2009, 3.9% of households in the United States owned birds, which equated to 11,199,000 pet birds in total, and 75% of these belonged to the Psittaciforme order.

== CITES ==
CITES organization aims to restrict the import and export of endangered species. In appendix I CITES lists species are threatened by extinction, and that trade within these species is only permitted in exceptional circumstances. Appendix II species listed are not immediately threatened by extinction but trading must be controlled. Appendix III are species that are protected in at least one country. Specifically for appendix I CITES restricts the trading of wild birds, species within can only be traded if a permit is granted. In a study done in Singapore in 2016, they found that 23% (54,207) of CITES Appendix I, II, and III listed birds and 35.2% (78,406) of CITES Appendix I, II, and III listed Parrots were not re-exported after their arrival. Tracking where parrots go after they have been imported and exported can help determine whether or not the birds are being breed at the locations that are importing, or whether they are being sold as pets.

== International trade ==
The pet trade is a large contributor to the legal and illegal sides of wild animal consumption every year. There are many ways that legal wild life trade are regulated to try and ensure sustainable biodiversity. However, illegal trade is still an immense issue today. It's estimated that pet trade is worth, at a global level, $30.6-42.8 billion annually. It is also estimated that $8.6-20.8 of the total is obtained through illegal trade. All over the world animals are being captured, breed, transported, and sold. There are two main ways that Parrots are brought into trade. The first is that they will be caught from the wild and then transported to places where they are then sold. The second being that they are captively breed from wild populations, and are then sold into the trade. With both of these during the capture, transport and breeding process the mortality rate of birds is high.

When looking wild caught and also captive breed animals involved in the wildlife trade. Birds are among the highest in the number of species that are involved in trade and also the ones that have a large number of threatened species are affected by the pet trade. Birds are one of the most commonly traded taxonomic groups worldwide, with ca. 4000 of both wild-caught and captive-bred origin species sold and kept as pets. In fact, approximately a third (>400) of all globally threatened bird species are thought to be affected by overexploitation for food or cage bird trade.

=== Top exporters ===
The greatest number of parrots came from Latin American countries (mostly Guyana, Suriname and Argentina). The top bird exporting countries are: Argentina, Tanzania, Senegal, and Indonesia

=== Top importers ===
The largest importers of parrots are: the European Union, the United States, Singapore, Central America, and the Caribbean.

Prior to 1992, the United States was the largest importer, but after the Wild Bird Conservation Act was passed in 1992, the European Union emerged as the leading importer. In the 2000-2003 period, the EU imported 2.8 million wild bird species, accounting for 93% of imports worldwide.

The chart below graphs the gross exports of true parrots, members of the family Psittacidae, a subtaxon of the order Psittaciformes.

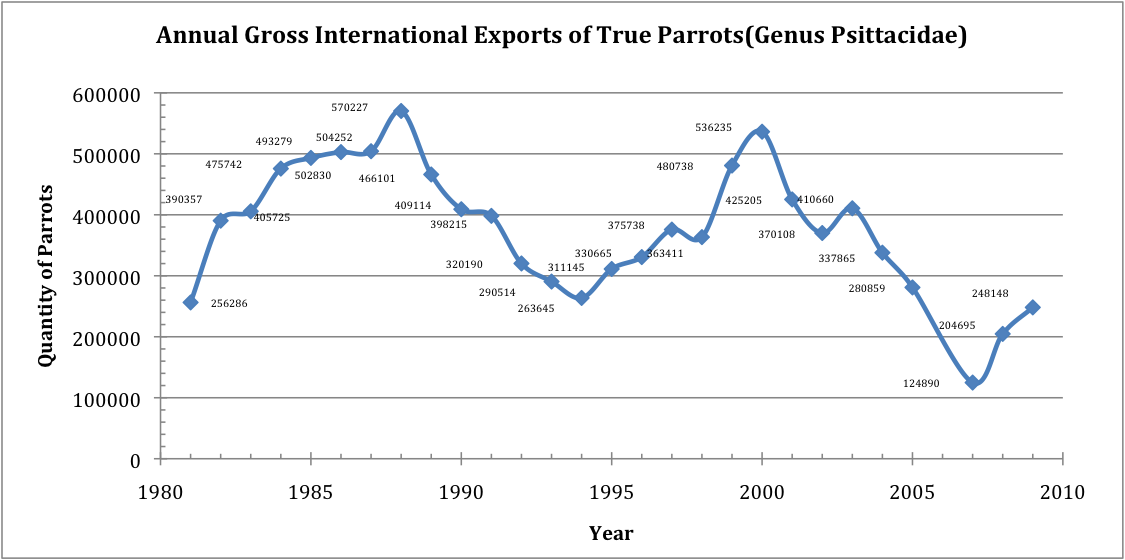
Gross exports of true parrots

However, the statistics greatly underestimate the quantity of birds channeled into the pet trade. Mortalities that occur prior to export are excluded. An estimated 60% of the birds taken from the wild for trade may perish before reaching the market and many die in transport.

The parrot trade has grown in Latin America, due to the wide availability of species in this area and the high global demand for exotic pets. The trade regulations vary between countries and are difficult to enforce, which has led to this continued practice despite the issues it causes. There is a lack of knowledge about the husbandry of exotic pets, particularly parrots, leading to inadequate care in captivity and illnesses, such as hypovitaminosis A disorder, which can be fatal. Additionally, the escape and owner release of these birds into the wild can also threaten species by establishing non-native populations.

== Trade in the United States ==
Although most parrots in the United States are imported (see chart below), some appear to be captured domestically. Florida's wild blue-and-yellow macaws are not native to the state and therefore are not protected under Florida law. Pam Wright explained, "Florida's wild parrots are being poached, sold on the internet, and it's perfectly legal." In the documentary Parrots in Peril, Neil Losin argues, "Wherever you find wild animals that have commercial value in the pet trade—cities included—poaching can become a problem".

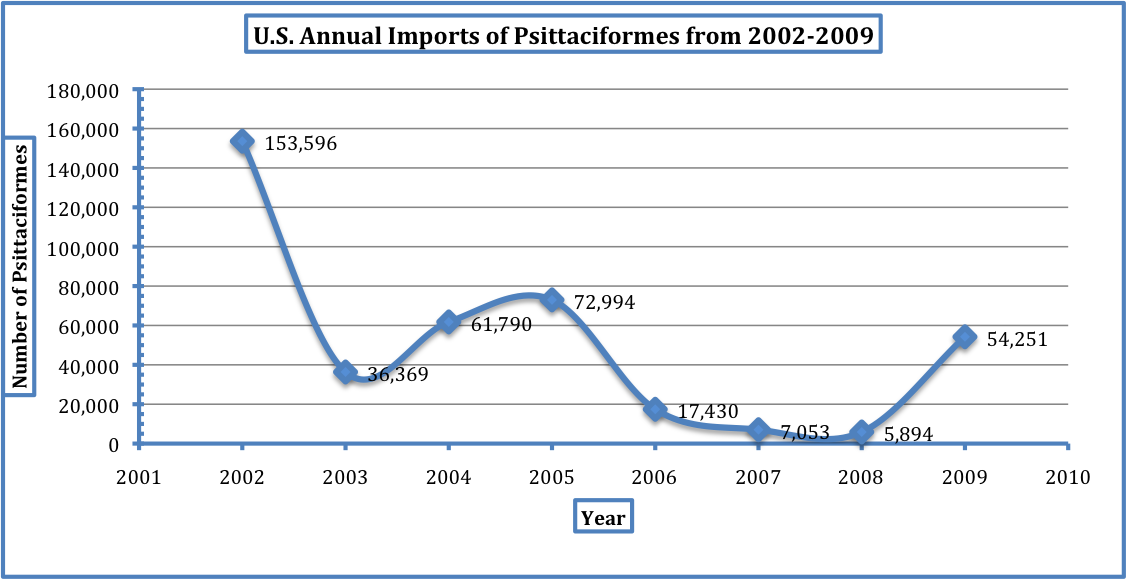
United States parrot trade

== Legal rules and restrictions regarding Psittacidae trade ==
The Wild Bird Conservation Act (WBCA) was enacted on October 23, 1992, to protect exotic bird species from international trade. The Act maintains that wild-caught birds may only be imported into the United States if they are produced in accordance with service-approved management plans for sustainable use of the species. After the WBCA, the number of parrots imported in the US declined from over 100,000 annually to only hundreds annually.

The European Union placed a temporary ban on wild bird imports in October 2005 after imported birds died from the H5N1 bird flu. The ban was made permanent in 2007, allowing only captive-bred birds from approved countries to be imported.

The Convention on International Trade in Endangered Species (CITES) protects certain species from the effects of international trade. Several true parrots from the genus Ara (great green macaw, blue-throated macaw, scarlet macaw, military macaw), are all protected under Appendix 1 of CITES, meaning that commercial international trade in wild-sourced birds is prohibited.

== Trade in Mexico ==
Although it is difficult to account for the exact number of birds trafficked each year, a comprehensive survey of parrot trappers by Defenders of Wildlife, a US-based wildlife advocacy group, estimates that anywhere from 65,000 to 78,500 birds are captured and traded annually. The same report indicates that Psittacidae populations have declined as much as 30% in Mexico over the past century due to a combination of habitat loss and overexploitation of the trade of these animals.

=== History ===
Although declining parrot populations in Mexico are a modern worry, the Psittacine trade is deeply rooted in the country's history and culture. The Aztecs often kept parrots and macaws as pets, and their feathers were used to make ceremonial tokens. Smaller tribes taken over by the Aztec empire often provided their conquerors with Macaw feathers as a form of tribute and a symbol of submission. The Aztecs, who occupied Mesoamerica, also most likely traded Psittacidae feathers and animals with Pueblo peoples living in modern-day New Mexico. It is evident that a culture of internal and international trade of these birds existed even before the Spanish conquest. The international parrot trade increased as Spanish colonization opened the region to new trade routes. However, the illegal trade and smuggling of these birds only became recognized as an environmental issue and subsequently legislated in the 20th century.

=== Export ===
In September 1982 Mexico banned the commercial export of Psittacines, but because demand still existed in the United States, trade across the border continued illegally. Throughout the 1980s the majority of birds captured in Mexico were smuggled across the U.S. border to be sold as exotic pets. Beginning in the 1990s two major factors prompted the decrease of the flow of these birds into the U.S. First, the passage of the Wild Bird Conservation Act in the United States in 1992 led to a dramatic increase in the regulation of exotic birds entering the United States, naturally followed by a decrease in trade. Second, the Wild Bird Conservation Act authorized the creation of captive breeding centers in the United States. Although captive bred birds are usually more expensive due to the costs of being raised in captivity, Americans looking for exotic pets are generally able to afford these higher prices. The sale of captive bred parrots has largely overtaken that of illegal exotics in the U.S. A common misconception is that animal trafficking in Mexico today is fueled by demand from the United States similar to that of the drug trade. However, it has been determined that internal trade of Psittacines within Mexico is now actually far more detrimental and widespread than international smuggling.

=== Illegal Trade Within Mexico ===
The regulation of the parrot trade in Mexico has proven to be a problematic process. Until 2003, the parrot trade was authorized on a species by species basis. The number of species that could be legally trapped and sold had steadily declined since 1979, and in 2003 the Mexican government banned the trade of all Psittacines. However, in 2006 permits were once again issued for the capture and trade of select species. Although some trade in Psittacines was legal between 2006 and 2008, the absence of law enforcement for wildlife crimes meant that even trade in authorized species was usually perpetrated illegally. Before 2008, many parrots were captured and sold by bird trapper and salesman unions. These unions were often registered with the state, and agreed to terms that attempted to protect parrot populations in return for official trapping authorizations. Although these stipulations aimed to protect Psittacine populations, they proved to be largely ineffective in practice. For instance, federal law mandated that capture of authorized parrot species had to be performed inside UMA's, or Wildlife Conservation, Management, and Sustainable Utilization Units, which are areas of land registered with the federal Office of wildlife regulated under a specific species management plan. The law also set quotas and other specific rules for trappers within these UMA's. However, the Mexican wildlife law enforcement agency, PROFEPA, was too understaffed and underfunded to enforce these laws. It was not capable of monitoring each UMA for illicit activity. Instead, it visited a select group of predetermined UMA's each year, and performed inspections of UMA's where illegal activity had been reported. In 2005 only 54 out of the 6,446 UMA's in Mexico received visits from wildlife regulatory agencies. An absence of a concrete body of knowledge regarding Psitaccine populations and the activity of trappers within these areas meant that quotas were often exceeded and authorizations were bypassed. Consequently, it has been demonstrated that as much as 75% of the parrot trade, even in authorized species, was being perpetrated illegally.

A 2006 report by Cantu et al. report demonstrated that the illegal trade of Psittacines actually increased when trapping was authorized by government agencies. This was because illegal activity was much more easily concealed under the auspices of legal trade. The report suggested that the Mexican government stop issuing trapping authorizations for all species of parrots and macaws, and so a ban on the Psittacine trade was placed into effect in October 2008.

Although this ban might be successful in deterring some of the organized trade in Psittacines, the illegal parrot trade is still a major problem today. Psittacines are poached from the wild by opportunistic peasants who use the animals they sell as a primary or secondary source of income. This poaching is difficult to trace or regulate because it is widespread and performed without any sort of record-keeping. The captured parrots are often sold to middlemen called itinerant fences who travel to different locations to purchase parrots from villagers and later sell them to open air markets located in more densely populated areas.

PROFEPA attempts to combat the illegal parrot trade using several methods including directly attending to reports regarding illegal activity; making scheduled inspections of markets, pet shops, zoos, and UMA's; pinpointing identified locations for sale and transport; and patrolling ports, airports, and borders. However, these efforts do not make a significant impact. Much of PROFEPA's enforcement activity is concentrated on the point of sale, but the high rate of mortality in trafficked parrots means that intervention efforts often occur too late to save the smuggled birds. The agency also lacks the resources to conduct raids on warehouses and markets that are used to store and sell parrots. Even when these operations can be implemented, PROFEPA is hindered by insiders who tip off the bird traders so that they can hide their animals before the raids occur. (new info, defenders, 54) Because of its ineffective system of management, it has been estimated that PROFEPA's seizures of wildlife represent only 2% of the total annual Psittacine trade.

=== Solutions To Illegal Trade ===
Today, the illegal parrot trade continues because it is a low risk, high reward criminal activity. Intervention is problematic because there is a limited body of knowledge regarding the topic, and records kept by government agencies are sparse.

A 2006 report by Cantu. et al. is one of the only comprehensive and concentrated bodies of knowledge regarding the extent of the Psittacine trade in Mexico. This report is largely based on interviews with bird traders and union leaders, and attempts to organize data collected by a variety of Mexican agencies regarding the issue. However, the document is limited by a lack of concrete evidence specifically regarding the number of birds taken from the wild each year, and relies on interviews and speculation to fill in the gaps left by the absence of scientific data. It advocates for an increase in Psittacine population studies to regulate trade and to be able to formulate effective measures for reducing the exploitation of Psittacine populations. Because of the widespread and disorganized nature of the Psitaccine trade, literature suggests that improved enforcement of current regulatory methods is not feasible due to the financial limitations of PROFEPA and other wildlife administration agencies.

Alternative forms of prevention were suggested in several different studies. A 2011 report by Pires and Moreto advocates a system of situational crime prevention in which enforcement is targeted on a community basis. They write, "…in areas where parrot poaching is concentrated, possible solutions to poaching include: removing ladders from trees, keeping a watch out by citizens/police during breeding periods, shutting down illegal pet markets, and CCTV for the most poached species." They conclude that a concentration of resources in the areas where they are most needed would prove most effective in reducing illegal trade.

A similar study by Pires and Clarke suggests that campaigns to build national pride for the Psitaccines of Mexico could be effective in lowering trafficking rates, but they acknowledge that the campaign may not be successful due to Mexico's large urban population and diversity of parrot species. A more comprehensive and concrete suggestion, also by Pires and Clarke, is to promote and invest in ecotourist lodges that partner with local communities in order to conserve Psittacine populations by using them to attract tourists who stimulate the local economy. If these lodges were effective in providing adequate support to surrounding communities, it is foreseeable that the parrot trade in those areas would decrease as opportunistic trappers realize the value of psittacines as a natural resource. Need based trapping would decline as primary or secondary incomes would become dependent on the ecotourism business.

== Illegal market ==
Smuggling reached its peak in the 1980s when an estimated 50,000 to 150,000 neotropical parrots were smuggled annually into the United States.

=== Sample market prices ===
- A Lear's macaw sells for approximated $60,000-$90,000
- Hyacinth macaws sell for $5000–$12,000 per mature breeding pair
- Captive bred blue-and-yellow macaw were sold for around $1,800 in the United States in the early 1980s, and for $650 to $900 in the early 1990s
- Live birds and bird eggs are the second most common major seizure by the Australian Customs Service
- The price of a blue and gold macaw could be as high as $1200 in the early 1990s

== See also ==
- Environmental agreements
- Wildlife Enforcement Monitoring System
- Wildlife conservation
- Wildlife management
- Wildlife smuggling
- Poaching
