= Río San Juan =

Río San Juan (Spanish for St. John's River) may refer to:

== Rivers ==
- San Juan River (Argentina)
- Río Grande de San Juan, Argentina
- San Juan River (Vancouver Island), Canada
- San Juan River (Colombia)
- San Juan River (Guatemala)
- Río San Juan (Querétaro), Mexico, affected by the 2021 Tula River floods
- San Juan River (Tamaulipas), Mexico
- San Juan River (Veracruz), Mexico
- San Juan River (Nicaragua)
- San Juan River (Calamba), Philippines
- San Juan River (Metro Manila), Philippines
- St. Johns River, Florida, U.S.
- San Juan River (Colorado River tributary) Utah, U.S.
- San Juan River (Uruguay)
- San Juan River (Venezuela)

== Other ==
- Río San Juan, Dominican Republic, a municipality
- Río San Juan Department, Nicaragua
- Río San Juan Wildlife Refuge, Nicaragua

== See also ==
- San Juan River (disambiguation)
