= Cerro Blanco Forest =

Forest in Ecuador

Cerro Blanco Forest Spanish: Bosque Protector Cerro Blanco

Geography
- Location: Ecuador

Administration
- Website: www.bosquecerroblanco.ec

Cerro Blanco Forest (Spanish: Bosque Protector Cerro Blanco) is a tropical dry forest reserve in the Guayas Province of Ecuador. It belongs to the company Holcim Ecuador and is administered by the foundation Fundación Pro-Bosque. It can be visited. More than 200 species of birds, more than 50 species of mammals (more than twenty of them bats), more than 10 species of reptiles and 10 species of amphibians can be seen, along with a variety of spiders, butterflies and other animals. It is known for its howler monkeys. Jaguars are also said to be found here.

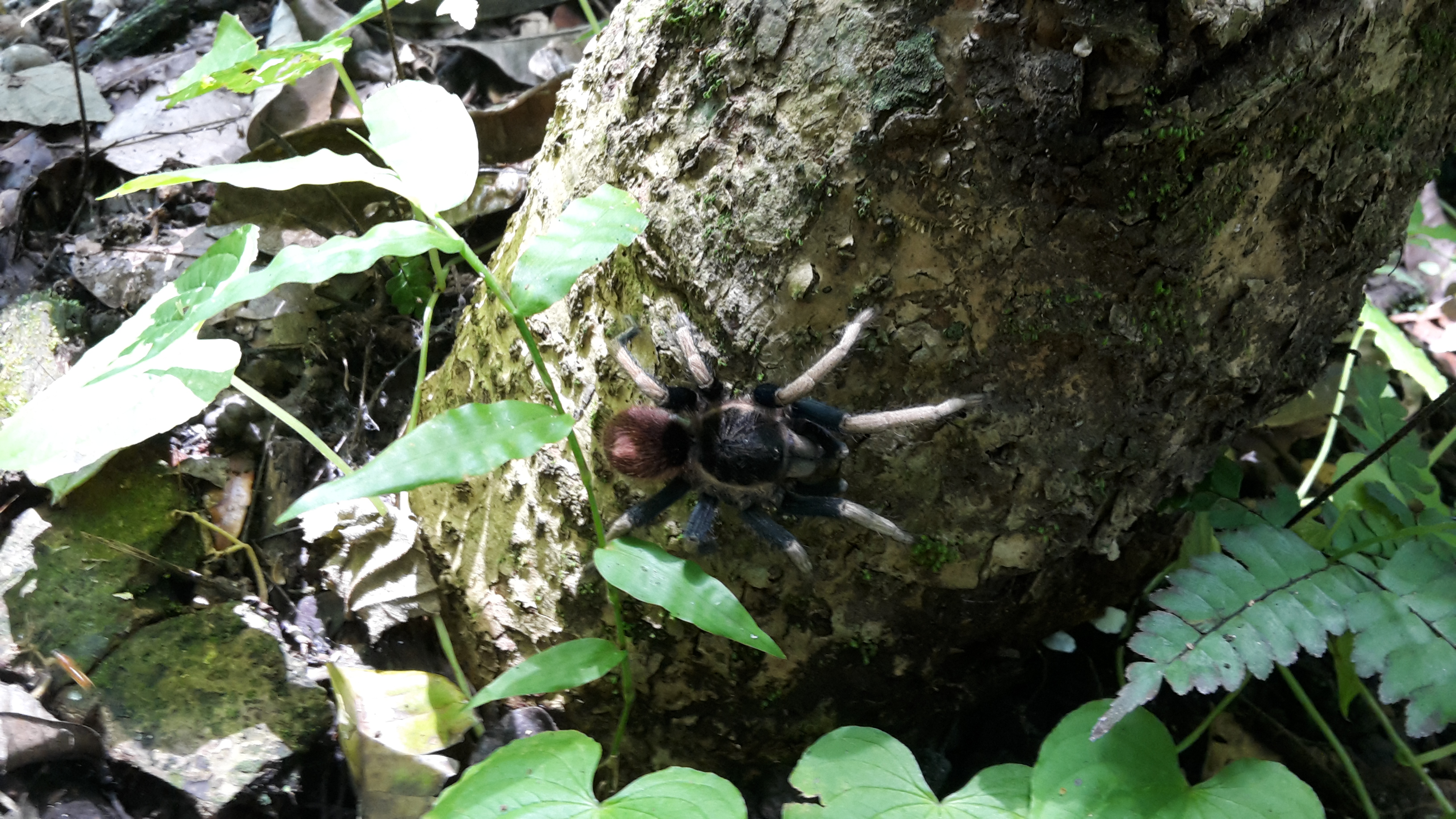
Tarantula

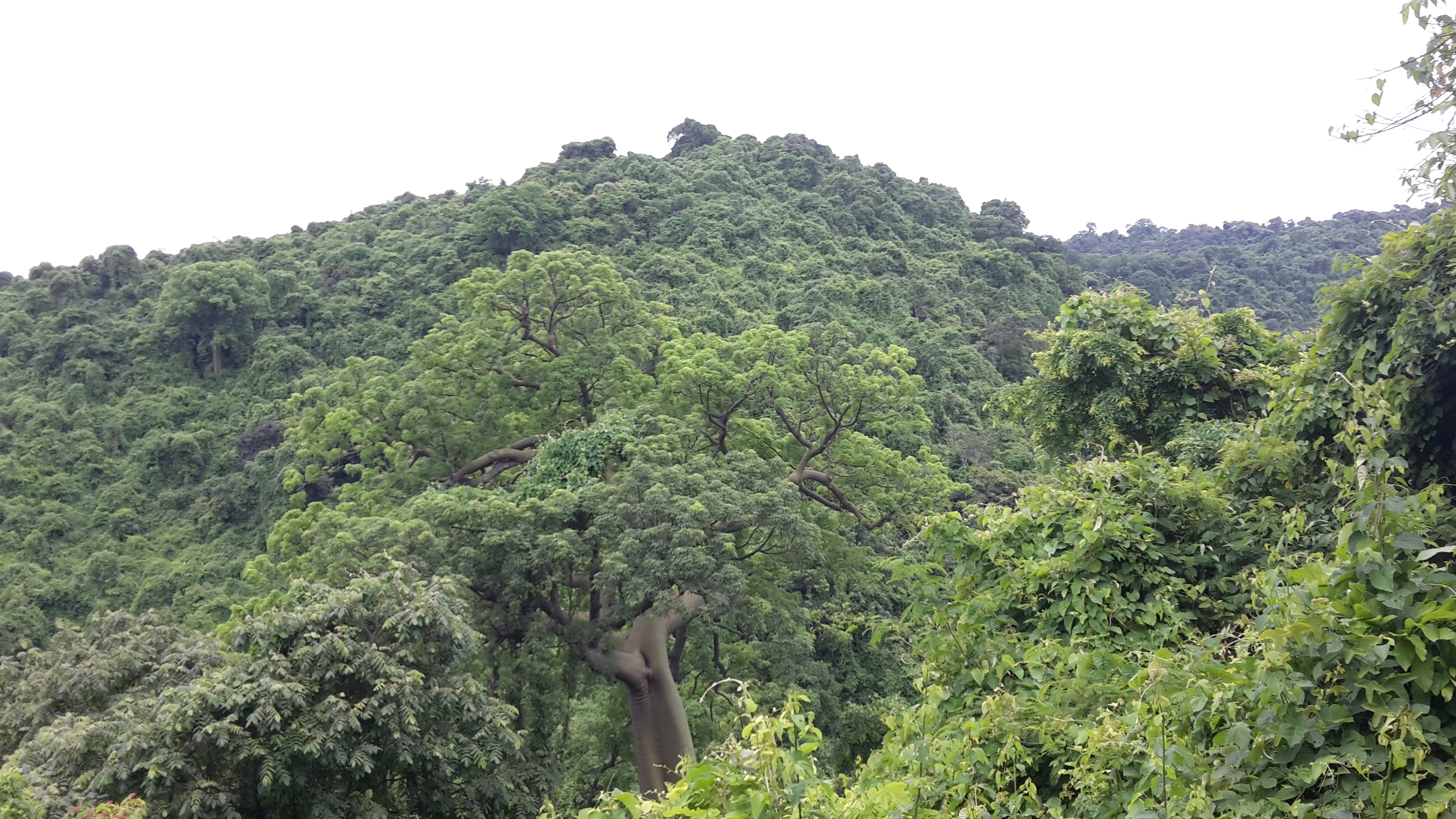

It is the most important conservation area for the southern population of the Guayaquil macaw, Ara ambiguus ssp. guayaquilensis, endemic to western coastal Ecuador.
