= The Ara Project =

- Interactive map of The Ara Project
- 9°51′42.92″N 85°24′13.06″W
- Date opened: 1992
- Location: Punta Islita, Guanacaste, Costa Rica
- No. of animals: 200
- No. of species: 2
- Website: http://www.thearaproject.org

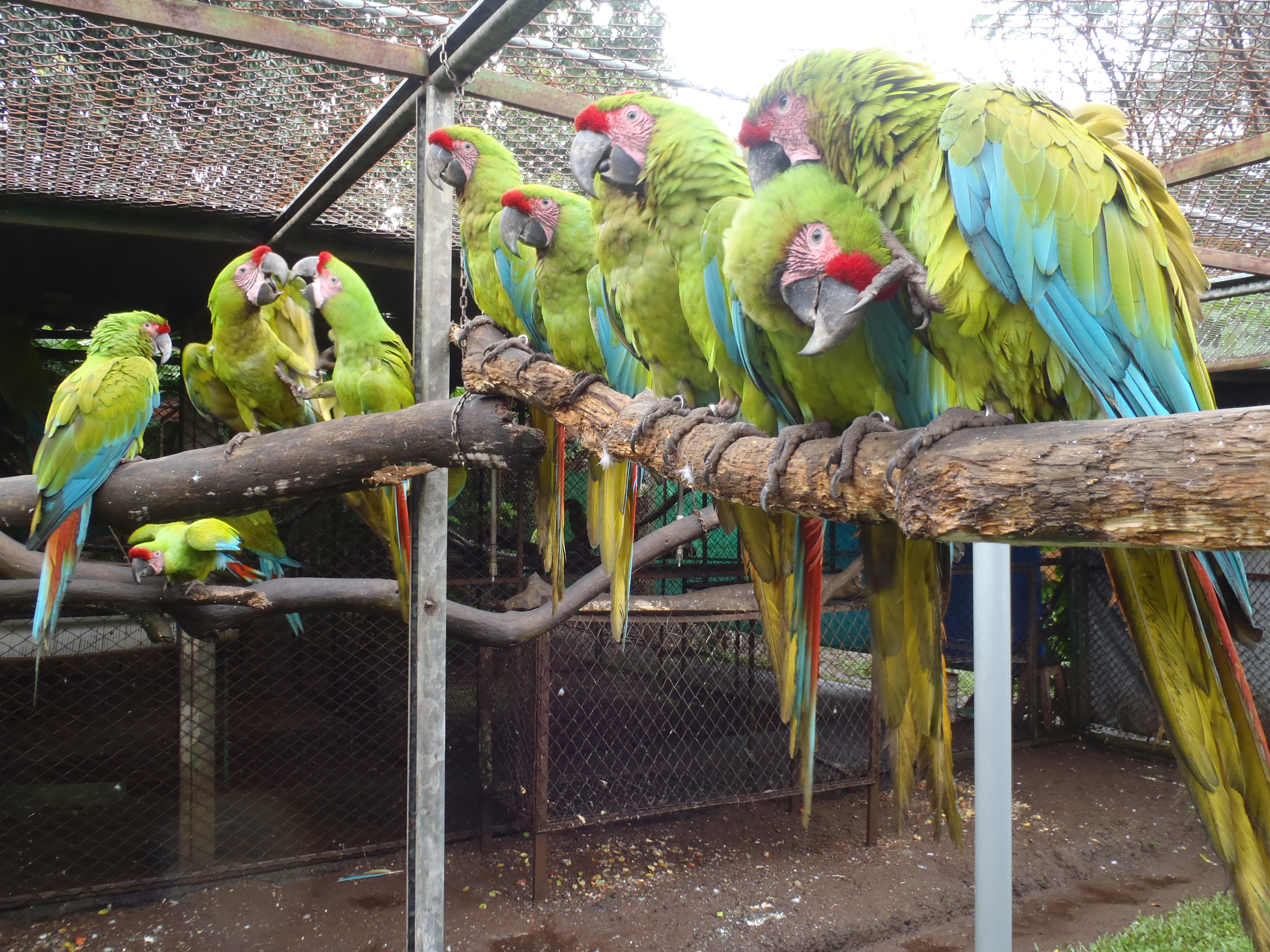
Great green macaws at the Breeding Center The Ara Project

The Ara Project was an NGO and former zoo run by a retired United States expatriate couple that existed in from the 1980s to 2008 as a private zoo under the name Amigos de las Aves. It was re-branded from 2009 to 2018 as "The Ara Project" with the goal of conserving the two native macaw species of Costa Rica: the great green macaw (Ara ambiguus), known locally as lapa verde, and the scarlet macaw (Ara macao), known locally as lapa roja. It has since re-branded again.

== History ==
In the 1980s retired American expatriate couple Margot and Richard Frisius started a zoo called "Amigos de las Aves". Over the years they created what had become the biggest collection of great green macaws in captivity.

Amigos de las Aves launched a scarlet macaw reintroduction program in 1999 on the property of Tiskita Jungle Lodge, although as of 2010 these released birds had not bred.

In January 1999 Amigos de las Aves released 13 scarlet macaws at a forested site at an ecolodge calling itself the Curú Wildlife Refuge on the southern Nicoya Peninsula of northwestern Costa Rica. As of 2004 these had not bred in the wild.

In 2008 Margot Frisius died and the Frisius family decided to hand over the organization to a trust fund known since 2009 as "The Ara Project". To comply with new Costa Rican wildlife laws imposed by MINAE (Ministry of Environment, Energy and Telecommunications) further controlled release programs were initiated.

At a forested site near Golfito the Alajuela Costa Rica Zoo Ave, a zoo near the city of Alajuela which houses rescued animals captured from poachers or smugglers by the government, 38 scarlet macaws were released by 2002. These were raised free of human contact, unlike those at Curú. As of 2004 these had also not bred in the wild. Rescate Animal Zoo Ave still exists, but The Ara Project macaw breeding centre was moved in 2013 to Punta Islita. Ten birds were released in the Punta Islita area in 2012, of which seven survived as of 2013.

Over 150 scarlet macaws have been released, with its latest population in Punta Islita where over 50 macaws have been released since 2011. Released populations are now breeding successfully.

Between 2011 and 2016, 45 great green macaws were released in Manzanillo de Limon. Nest boxes are installed and education activities take place in the local region. The population is now an established population that is breeding in the wild.

Between 2015 and 2018, The Ara Project was run by Sam Williams. It busied itself with captive breeding, reintroductions, wild population management, making artificial nest boxes, education and habitat management. As of 2019 the project has branched into two NGOs, the Macaw Recovery Network based in Punta Islita and Ara Manzanillo, each entity existing independently. Williams now runs the Macaw Recovery Network, which focusses primarily on researching and protecting wild Macaw populations, captive breeding to re-establishing populations where they went extinct, inspiring local communities and reforestation in the North of Costa Rica.

As of 2019 macaw populations in Costa Rica appear to be slowly recovering. According to the Macaw Recovery Network there are about 300 green macaws in the north and the Caribbean coast of Costa Rica, while the red macaws reach about 2,000 animals. According to Ara Manzanillo there are some 350 in Costa Rica (E. Monge 2010).
