= Fundación de Conservación Jocotoco =

Ecuadorian non-governmental organization

Fundación de Conservación Jocotoco (Jocotoco Conservation Foundation) is an Ecuadorian non-governmental environmental organization. It was established to purchase and protect land important to the conservation of endangered birds in Ecuador.

Fundación de Conservación Jocotoco established its first reserve, the Tapichalaca Biological Reserve, in 1998 to protect the type locality and main range of the newly discovered Jocotoco antpitta (Grallaria ridgelyi). The reserve now protects more than 2870 hectares of forest and an associated 380+ species of birds and numerous range-restricted plants, amphibians, mammals, and invertebrates.

Fundación de Conservación Jocotoco has established eleven reserves protecting 16,000 hectares (40,000 acres):

- Ayampe, Dry forest near the Pacific Ocean. Esmeraldas woodstar, great green macaw.
- Buenaventura, wet upper foot hill forest on west slope of Andes. One of only a few localities for El Oro parakeet, and El Oro tapaculo. Also the Giant Caecilian has been found here.
- Chakana (formerly Antisanilla), highland paramo southeast of Quito. Andean condor and spectacled bear.
- Copalinga, wet foot hill forest on eastern slope of Andes, very close to Zamora and Podocarpus National Park.
- Jorupe, Tumbesian dry forest. Henna-hooded foliage-gleaner, rufous-necked foliage-gleaner, blackish-headed spinetail, gray-headed antbird.
- Narupa, wet foothill forest on the east slope of the Andes. Coppery-chested jacamar, Napo sabrewing, many other foothill species.
- Río Canandé, wet Chocó lowlands of the northwest. Scarlet-breasted dacnis, banded ground-cuckoo, great curassow, golden-chested tanager.
- Tapichalaca, wet lower subtropical forest up to páramo on east slope of Andes. Jocotoco antpitta, golden-plumed parakeet, white-necked parakeet, Peruvian antpitta, bicolored antvireo, masked saltator, greater scythebill.
- Utuana, temperate forest on slopes above inter-Andean valley. Piura hemispingus, rainbow starfrontlet, black-crested tit-tyrant.
- Yanacocha, upper temperate forest on Volcán Pichincha. Black-breasted puffleg (one of the few remaining world localities for this critically endangered species), imperial snipe, rainbow-bearded thornbill.
- Yunguilla, woodland south of Cuenca. Only known locality for the critically endangered pale-headed brush-finch.

Fundación de Conservación Jocotoco supports an active research program at the reserves. Projects include:

- Documenting reproductive biology and identifying critical breeding habitat of Esmeraldas woodstar in coastal Ecuador
