= The Macaw Society =

Research project at Texas A&M University

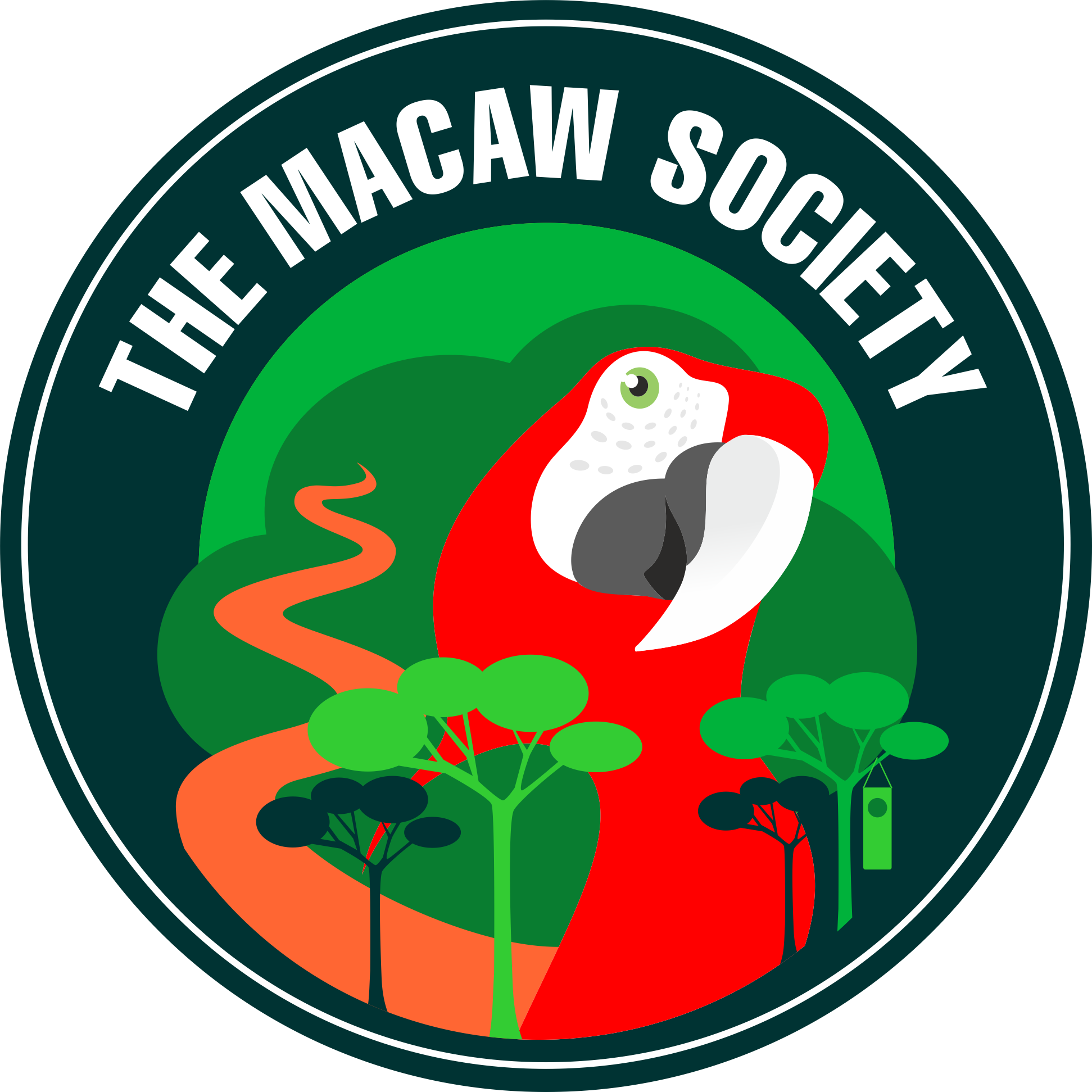
- Formation: January 1, 1989; 37 years ago
- Location: Tambopata National Reserve / Bahuaja-Sonene National Park, Madre de Dios Region, Peru
- Directors: Donald Brightsmith and Gabriela Vigo
- Website: themacawsociety.org
- Formerly called: Tambopata Macaw Project

The Macaw Society (formerly known as the Tambopata Macaw Project) is a long-term research project on the ecology and conservation of macaws and parrots under the direction of Donald Brightsmith and Gabriela Vigo of the Schubot Center for Avian Health at the Texas A&M University. The project has been working with wildlife and local communities since 1989. The long-term research and monitoring have provided many insights into various aspects of parrot and wildlife of south-eastern Peru. Macaws are among the most effective flagship species for ecosystem conservation in the Amazonian rainforest.

== Location ==
The main operation of The Macaw Society focuses on a large uninhabited track of primary tropical lowland forest surrounding the Colorado Clay Lick, which is situated in the Tambopata National Reserve on the upper Tambopata River, very near to the Bahuaja-Sonene National Park, in the Madre de Dios Region of Peru. From 1989 until March 2020 the project was headquartered in the Tambopata Research Center (TRC), a tourist lodge operated by the company Rainforest Expeditions.

The Madre de Dios Region hosts a unique forest environment, with the highest concentrations of avian clay licks in the world. A range of animals comes to satisfy their need for salt along the river banks of the region. Sometimes hundreds of macaws can be seen at the Colorado and Chuncho clay licks near to the Tambopata National Reserve.

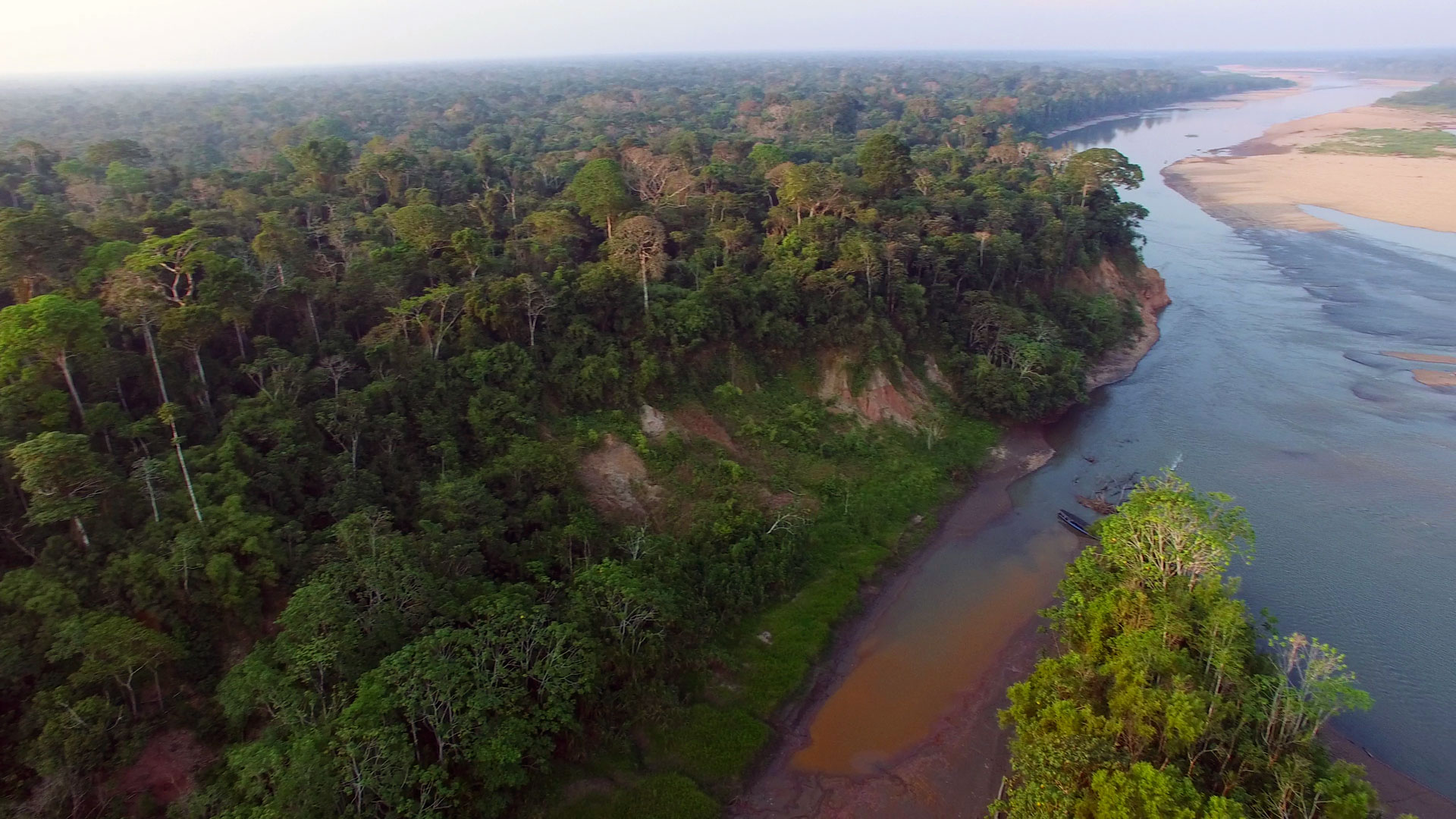
The Colorado Clay Lick (Collpa Colorado)

== History ==
The project, which was established by Peruvian Eduardo Nycander, grew out of and was based on previous research by Charles A. Munn III done in the nearby Manu National Park. In 1991 and 1992, the researchers accelerated the formation of natural dead palm cavities by cutting off the crowns of 23 live maurita palms (Mauritia flexuosa) in a natural monoculture of thousands of these palms in a 0.5 km^{2} swamp near the Tambopata Research Center (TRC), as blue-and-yellow macaws in the region almost exclusively nest in dead mauritia palms. Decapitating these palms began the process of rotting the interior of the trunks, which eventually provides nesting sites for these macaws.

With the aim of providing nesting sites for large macaws in 1990, nest boxes made of palm (Iriartea ventricosa) were hung on branches of Dipteryx micrantha trees. Between 1992 and 1993, a total of eight wooden boxes made of tropical cedar (Cedrela odorata) and 21 artificial nests made from large PVC pipes were built and hung around TRC.

Based on field experience working with wild macaw chicks, researchers were able to determine which nestlings would die. These nestlings were removed, handfed for months and released, thereby increasing the reproductive output of the wild population.

Between 1992 and 1994, breeding seasons a variety of methods of rescuing and hand-raising of otherwise doomed nestlings were tested. In the period of 1992–1995, six blue-and-yellow macaws (Ara ararauna), 5 red-and-green macaws (Ara chloropterus), and 21 scarlet macaws (Ara macao) were hand-raised and released into the wild population. These individuals later were called "Chicos" (the kids). These birds fledged and gradually integrated themselves into the wild macaw population.

In November 1999, Donald Brightsmith became the director of the research project. Under his leadership, a broad spectra of scientific research has been carried out by the project.

Since 2006, the project's leading patron is the Schubot Center for Avian Health, College of Veterinary Medicine, Texas A&M University. Gabriela Vigo joined the project's leadership team in 2005. In 2020, the name of the project was changed to The Macaw Society (Sociedad Pro Guacamayos in Spanish).

== Research objectives ==
The principal aim of The Macaw Society is to study the various aspects of the ecology of large macaws and parrots in the Neotropics to help better understand the interactions among clay lick use, food supply, breeding season, breeding success, abundance, and movements. This information can aid conservation-focused projects on parrots worldwide.

A great interest to the project was that clay lick use by large macaws at the Colorado Clay Lick was very low in 2009 due to the changes in vegetation and soil conditions. However, in early 2010 the Peruvian government, together with the members of the research project managed the clay lick to help restore the large macaw usage. As a result, there was a unique opportunity to study the same populations of macaws both with and without clay lick use.

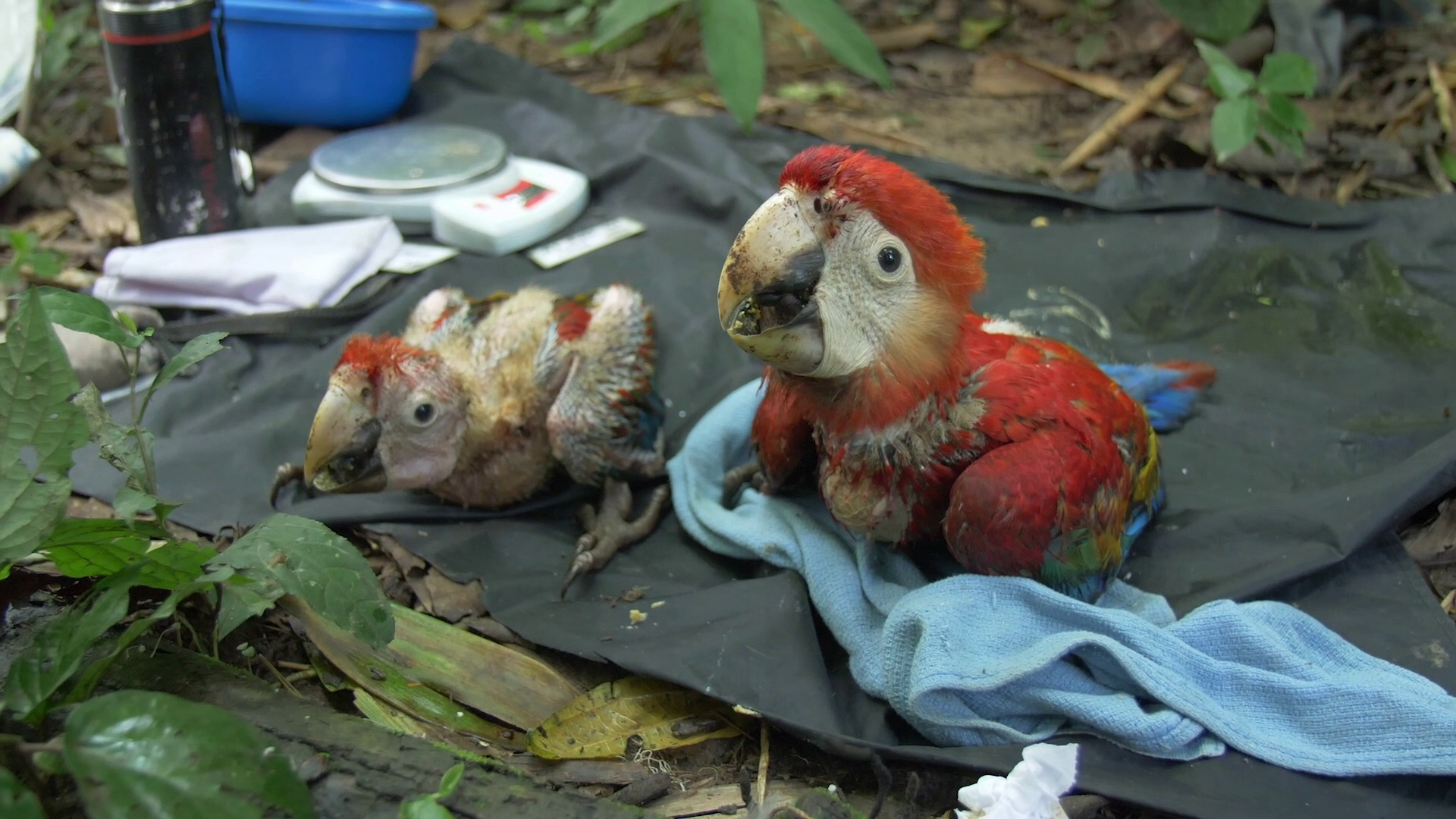
Scarlet macaw (Ara macao) juveniles examined by biologists in Tambopata

Another important aim of the project is to help train new generations of conservation scientists. As a result, the project works closely with young Peruvian and foreign assistants and helps them gain the skills they need for conducting research. Students interested in conducting their own independent studies as parts of independent study classes, or theses at the undergrad, M.Sc. or Ph.D. levels are encouraged to apply to study one of the many aspects of macaw and parrot biology at the sites.

== Studies ==
The staff of The Macaw Society monitors year round the clay lick activity at the Colorado Clay Lick, conducts parrot census in the forest, collects data on foraging of wild macaws, and records climate data in the Tambopata National Reserve. For more than a decade, the project has systematically recorded breeding biology data from large macaws. This study is carried out during the reproductive season of the macaws between November and March, by climbing natural and artificial nests in the region.

Since 2009, extensive veterinary research was carried out during the breeding seasons on adult and young macaws under the direction of Sharman Hoppes. These studies determined the health status of adult and young parrots to use this information to help manage parrots in captivity. Studies on psittacine diseases were also carried out with avian vets including Ian Tizard, David Phalen, and Jeff Musser.

In 2008, with the support of Janice Boyd, the project started a satellite telemetry study on captured macaws in the wild to investigate their home-range use and seasonal movements. George Olah studied the ecology and population genetics of large macaws in the Tambopata-Candamo region. Gustavo Martínez studied phenology, interaction between climate, food availability and parrot abundance in Tambopata. His study determined how large macaw nest success varied with relation to food supply and climate. Gabriela Vigo studied the nesting ecology and nesting behaviour of scarlet macaws, and proposed recommendations with implications for their conservation management.

From 2017 to 2019 (three breeding seasons), as part of Vigo’s PhD research, the project started the "wild macaws as foster parents" program by testing wild macaws to increase chick survival. The technique was categorically successful, as all relocated foster chicks were accepted by their foster parents (as of 2019).

== Ecotourism and voluntarism ==
The presence of macaws in an area destined for ecotourism in tropical America greatly increases its value. The presence of clay licks and nests where macaws are predictable and can be habituated to human presence increases the value of each macaw and therefore of the whole area.

Wild macaws habituate readily to noisy, exposed groups of tourists and are excellent subjects for wildlife photographers. Until 2018, the project has worked closely with Rainforest Expeditions, an ecotourism company that hosted the project at their TRC eco-lodge, and provided the project with partial salaries, transportation, food, lodging, and logistics.

In March 2020, The Macaw Society has moved out of the Tambopata Research Center, and it is no longer working with the commercial company Rainforest Expeditions nor using the name Tambopata Macaw Project.

The project also has attracted over 800 national and international volunteers, many of whom are now associated with the project on an ongoing basis. The project has been also serving as an effective mechanism to find and train talented young conservation professionals and activists.

== Media coverage ==
Since its beginning as The Tambopata Macaw Project, it has received substantial magazine and media coverage within Peru and internationally, thanks to its volunteers, the visiting tourists, tour operators, journalists, photographers and filmmakers.

The work of the project was featured in the documentary movie The Macaw Project – Biologists, Ecotourists and Local Communities for the Amazonian Rainforest, produced by Wildlife Messengers.
