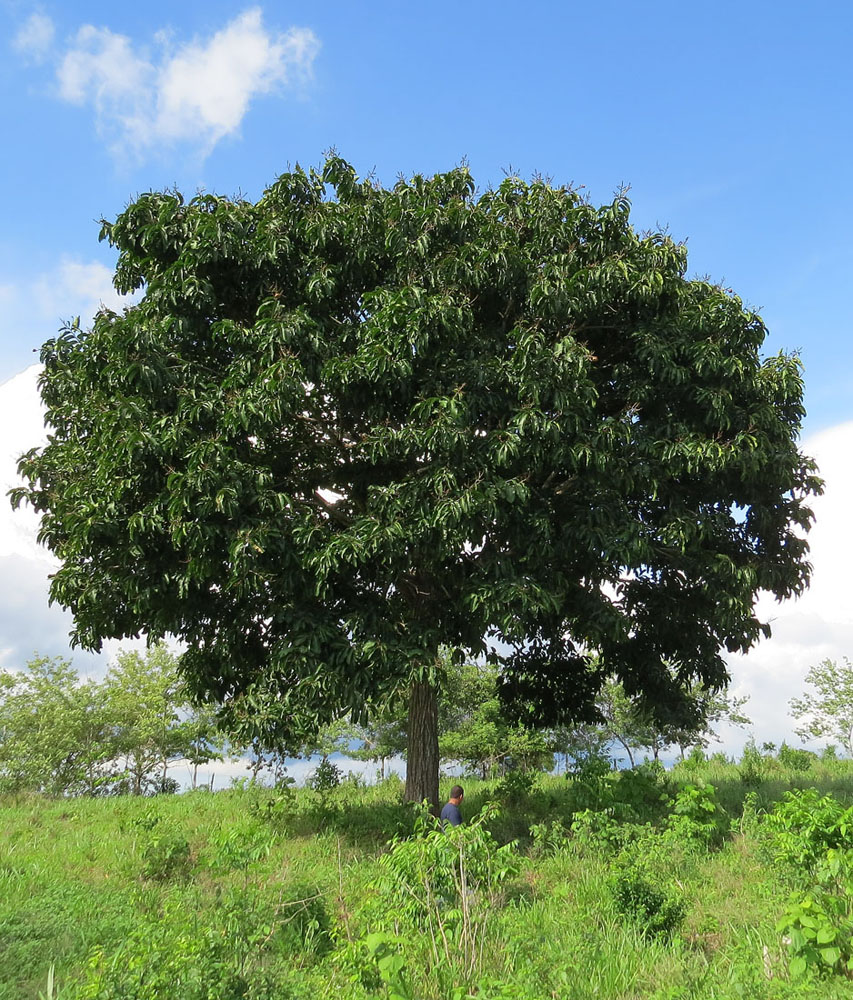

Scientific classification
- Kingdom: Plantae
- Clade: Tracheophytes
- Clade: Angiosperms
- Clade: Eudicots
- Clade: Asterids
- Order: Ericales
- Family: Lecythidaceae
- Genus: Lecythis
- Species: L. ampla

Binomial name
- Lecythis ampla Miers

Synonyms
- Lecythis ampullaria Miers; Lecythis armilensis Pittier; Lecythis bogotensis Miers; Lecythis boyacensis R.Knuth; Lecythis costaricensis Pittier; Lecythis curranii Pittier

= Lecythis ampla =

Species of tree

Lecythis ampla is a species of woody plant in the family Lecythidaceae, which also includes the Brazil nut (Bertholletia excelsa). Common names include coco, olla de mono, jicaro and salero. It is found in Central and South America. It has been considered an endangered species in Costa Rica (IUCN, 1988).

== Description ==
Lecythis ampla is a large tree growing to 45 m (148 ft) in height with no branches on its lower part. It is deciduous with most of the leaves dropping before it blooms and new leaves appearing in flushes with the flowers. The bark is greyish brown and vertically furrowed. The glossy leaves are alternate and elliptical with wavy edges. The flowers appear between May and July and are pollinated by bees. They have six petals that are either pink or pale mauve, but fade to white as the flower ages. The fruit is a woody capsule up to 20 by 30 cm (7.9 by 11.8 in) that hangs from the branch. It resembles a little pot and when it is ripe, after about ten months, the lid comes off and the nuts fall to the forest floor.

== Distribution ==
Lecythis ampla is endemic to Central America, extending from Nicaragua to Ecuador and Brazil. It is common in wet forests on the Atlantic slope in Nicaragua, Costa Rica, and Panama, and is found near the Pacific coast in Ecuador and in Colombia's Cauca and Magdalena valleys.

== Ecology ==
In Costa Rica, this tree grows at low densities in the forest, but the seedlings are shade tolerant, and natural regeneration rates are high. It often grows in association with the oil tree Pentaclethra macroloba, the almond Dipteryx panamensis and the mahogany Carapa guianensis. The seeds are eaten by pacas, agoutis and deer and are believed to be dispersed by rodents and bats. The fruit pulp is consumed by parrots and peccaries. The wet forest in which it grows has a biodiverse fauna of reptiles and amphibians.

== Uses ==
The sapwood is a creamy colour and fibrous, while the heartwood is dark brown when fresh and reddish brown when dried. The timber is resistant to marine boring invertebrates and is used for shipbuilding, bridges, and general and marine construction. It is also used to make furniture, tool handles, and posts. The bark can be used in tanning and has various other uses. The seeds can be eaten, but excessive consumption causes loss of hair. They are also used in northern Costa Rica to make sweets and caramel and in Panama as folk medicine to treat pneumonia and diarrhoea.
