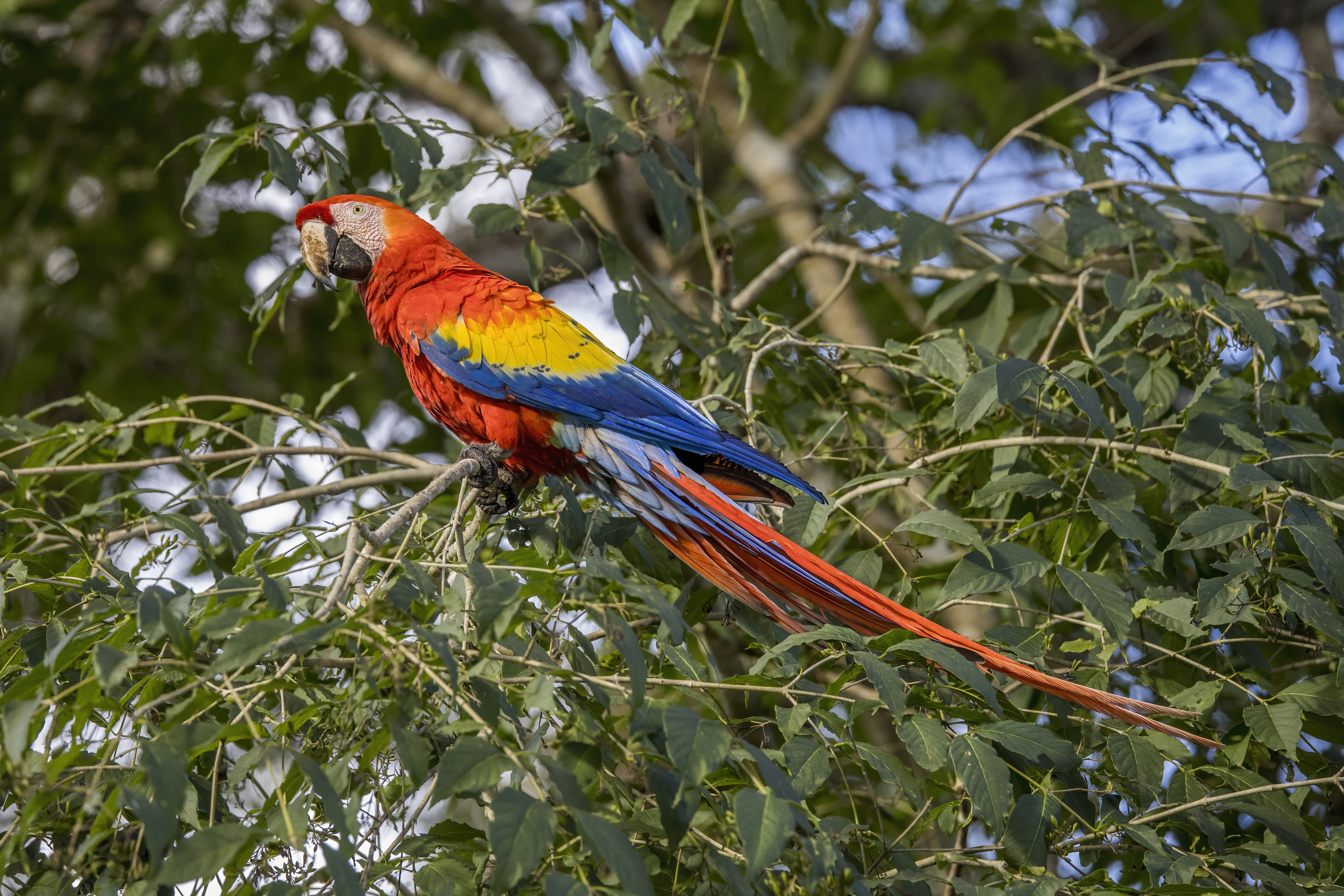
- A. m. cyanopterus Copan, Honduras

Conservation status
- Least Concern (IUCN 3.1)
- CITES Appendix I

Scientific classification
- Kingdom: Animalia
- Phylum: Chordata
- Class: Aves
- Order: Psittaciformes
- Family: Psittacidae
- Genus: Ara
- Species: A. macao

Binomial name
- Ara macao (Linnaeus, 1758)
- Extant distribution of the scarlet macaw

Synonyms
- Psittacus macao Linnaeus, 1758

= Scarlet macaw =

Species of bird

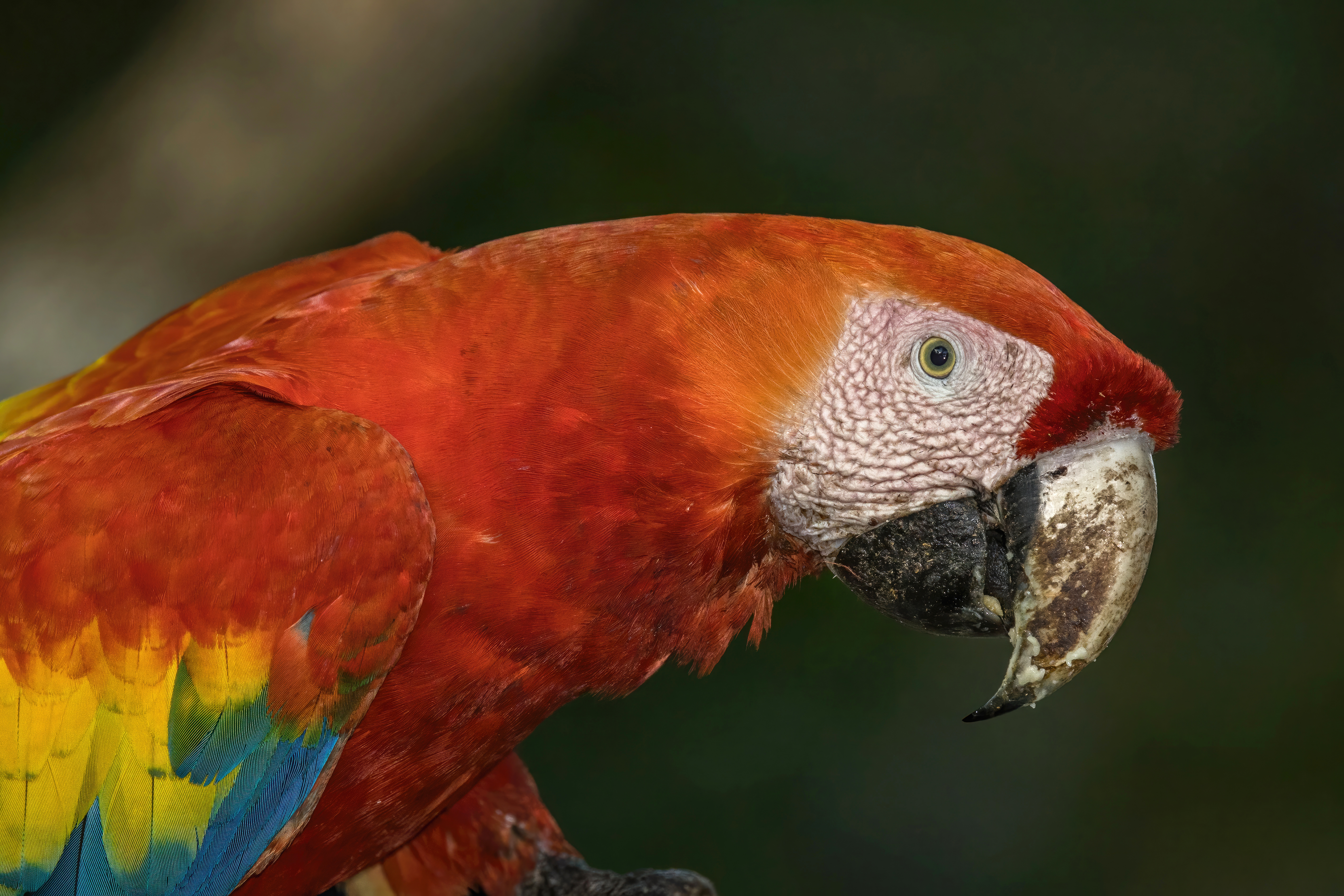
Copan, Honduras

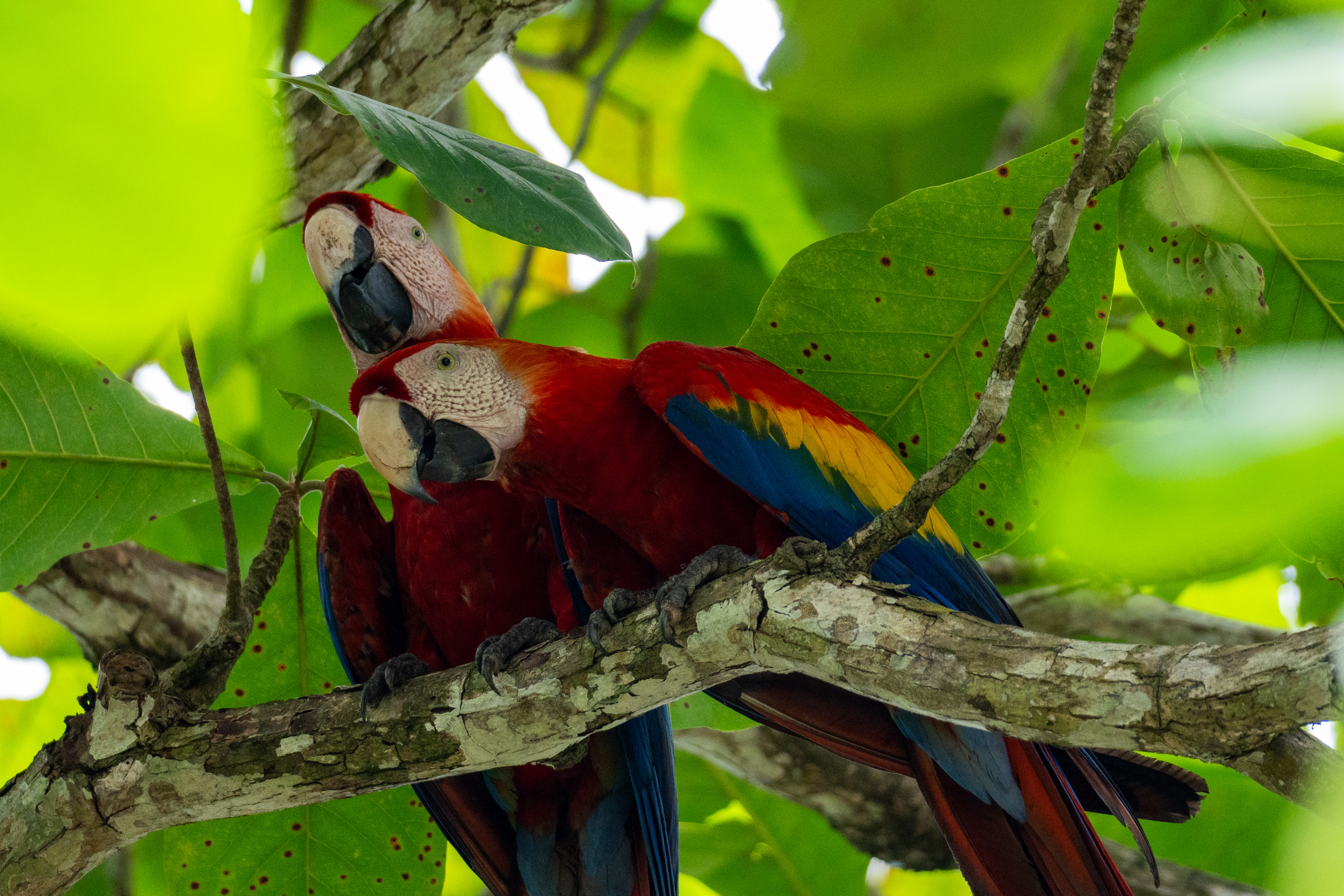
A partnered pair of wild scarlet macaws rub against each other in Costa Rica.

The scarlet macaw (Ara macao) also called the red-and-yellow macaw, red-and-blue macaw or red-breasted macaw, is a large yellow, green, red and blue Neotropical parrot native to humid evergreen forests of the Americas. Its range extends from southeastern Mexico to Peru, Ecuador, Colombia, Bolivia, Venezuela, Honduras, and Brazil in lowlands of 500 m (1,600 ft) (at least formerly) up to 1,000 m (3,300 ft), the Caribbean island of Trinidad, as well as the Pacific island of Coiba. Formerly, the northern extent of its range included southern Tamaulipas. In some areas, it has suffered local extinction because of habitat destruction, or capture for the parrot trade, but in other areas, it remains fairly common. It is the national bird of Honduras. Like its relative the blue-and-yellow macaw, the scarlet macaw is a popular bird in aviculture as a result of its striking plumage. It is the third most common macaw species in captivity after the blue-and-yellow and red-and-green macaw respectively. In recent years it has become much rarer in captivity and much more expensive due to stricter laws, its price being higher than even red-and-green macaws.

== Taxonomy ==
The scarlet macaw was formally described by the Swedish naturalist Carl Linnaeus in 1758 in the tenth edition of his Systema Naturae under the binomial name Psittacus macao. The scarlet macaw is now placed in the genus Ara (Lacépède, 1799), one of six genera of Central and South American macaws.

The two subspecies can be recognized by size and color detail in the feathers on the wings:

- Ara macao macao (Linnaeus, 1758): South American scarlet macaw, the nominate subspecies. In the wings the medium and secondary coverts have green tips.
- A. m. cyanopterus Wiedenfeld, 1995: North Central American scarlet macaw. The Central American scarlet macaw is larger and has blue on its wings instead of green.

=== Genetics ===
In May 2013, it was announced that a team of scientists, led by Dr. Christopher M. Seabury and Dr. Ian Tizard of Texas A&M University had sequenced the complete genome of the scarlet macaw. Based on this genome, species-specific microsatellite genetic markers were developed to aid genetic studies throughout the range of the species. These genetic markers were later validated on the trace amount of DNA acquired from feathers, and applied to study red-and-green macaws in a tropical landscape where DNA can degrade very quickly. These markers were proven to be useful to study their population genetics and identification of individuals in the landscape of the Peruvian Amazon.

== Description ==
It is about 84 centimeters (33 in) long, of which more than half is the pointed, graduated tail typical of all macaws, though the scarlet macaw has a larger percentage of tail than the other large macaws. The average weight is about 1 kilogram (2 lb 3 oz). The plumage is mostly scarlet, but the rump and tail-covert feathers are light blue, the greater upper wing coverts are yellow, the upper sides of the flight feathers of the wings are dark blue as are the ends of the tail feathers, and the undersides of the wing and tail flight feathers are dark red with metallic gold iridescence. Some individuals may have green in the wings. The Central American subspecies is larger and averages 89 cm or (35 in) in length.

There is bare white skin around the eye and from there to the bill. Tiny white feathers are contained on the face patch. The upper mandible is mostly pale horn in color and the lower is black. Juveniles have dark eyes; adults have light yellow eyes.

It is frequently confused with the slightly larger green-winged macaw, which has more distinct red lines in the face and no yellow in the wing.

Scarlet macaws make very loud, high and sometimes low-pitched, throaty squawks, squeaks and screams designed to carry many kilometers to call for their groups.

The scarlet macaw can live up to 75 or even 90 years in captivity, although a more typical lifespan is 40 to 50 years.

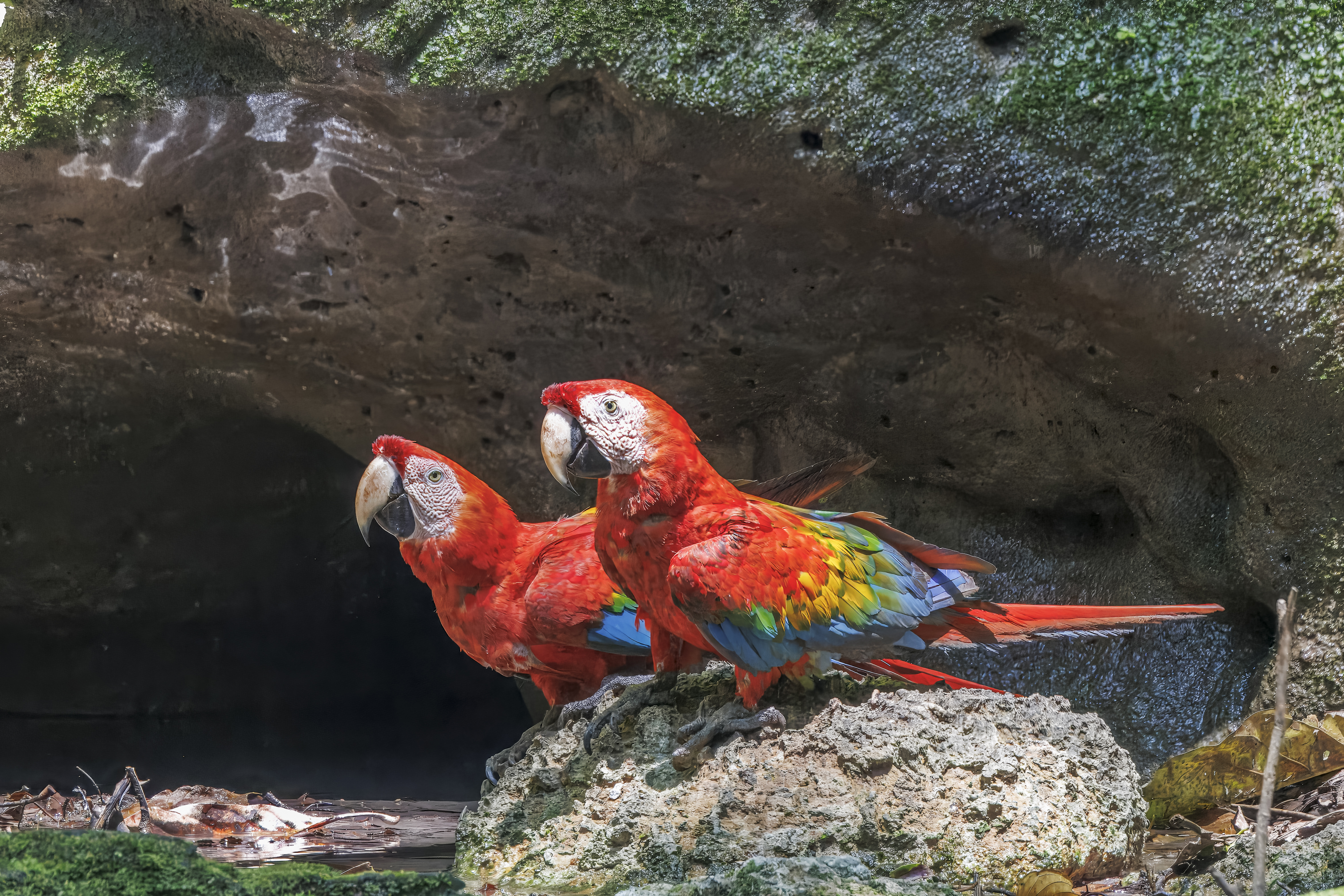
Pair of scarlet macaws

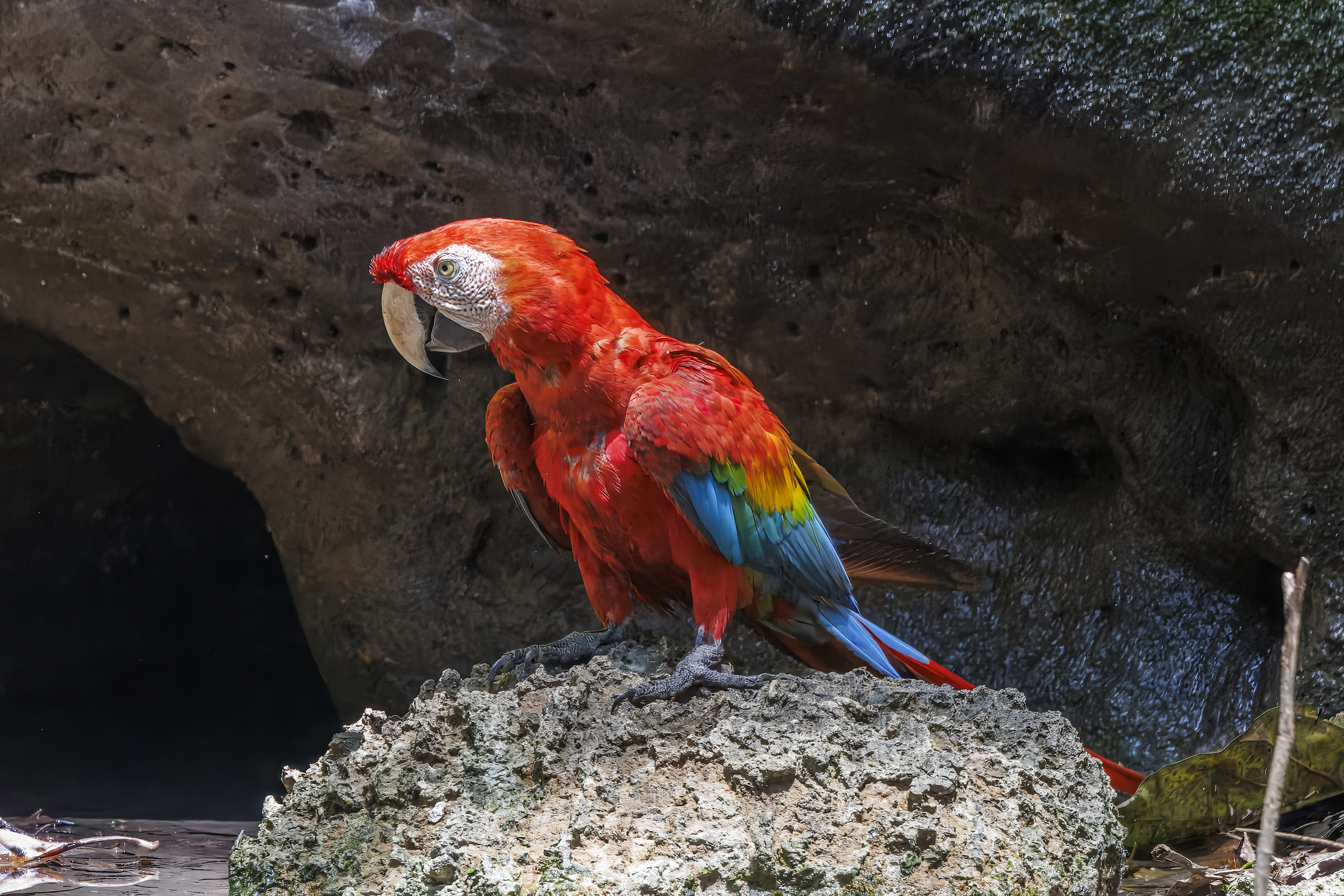
A. m. macao (all three images)
Saladero de Añangu, Ecuador

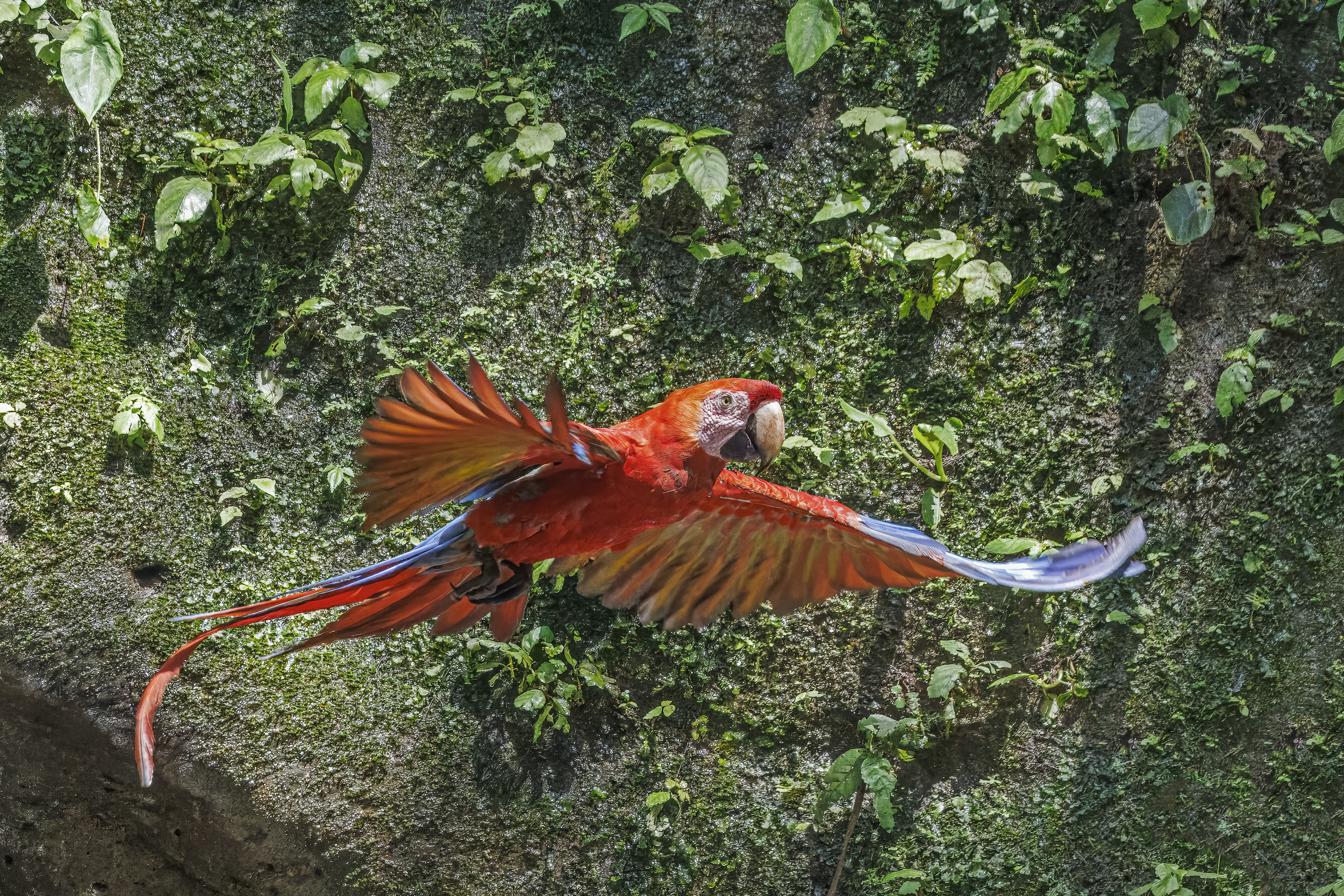
Scarlet macaw in flight

== Behavior ==
A typical sighting is of a single bird or a pair flying above the forest canopy, though in some areas flocks can be seen. Field observations in Costa Rica found that scarlet macaws spend nearly all their time high in the forest canopy, usually more than 10 m above the ground, and are rarely seen near or on the ground, likely to reduce predation risk and because most of their food sources occur in the canopy. They often gather at clay licks. Scarlet macaws communicate primarily through raucous honks; however, vocal communication is highly variable, and captive macaws are known to be adept mimics of human speech.

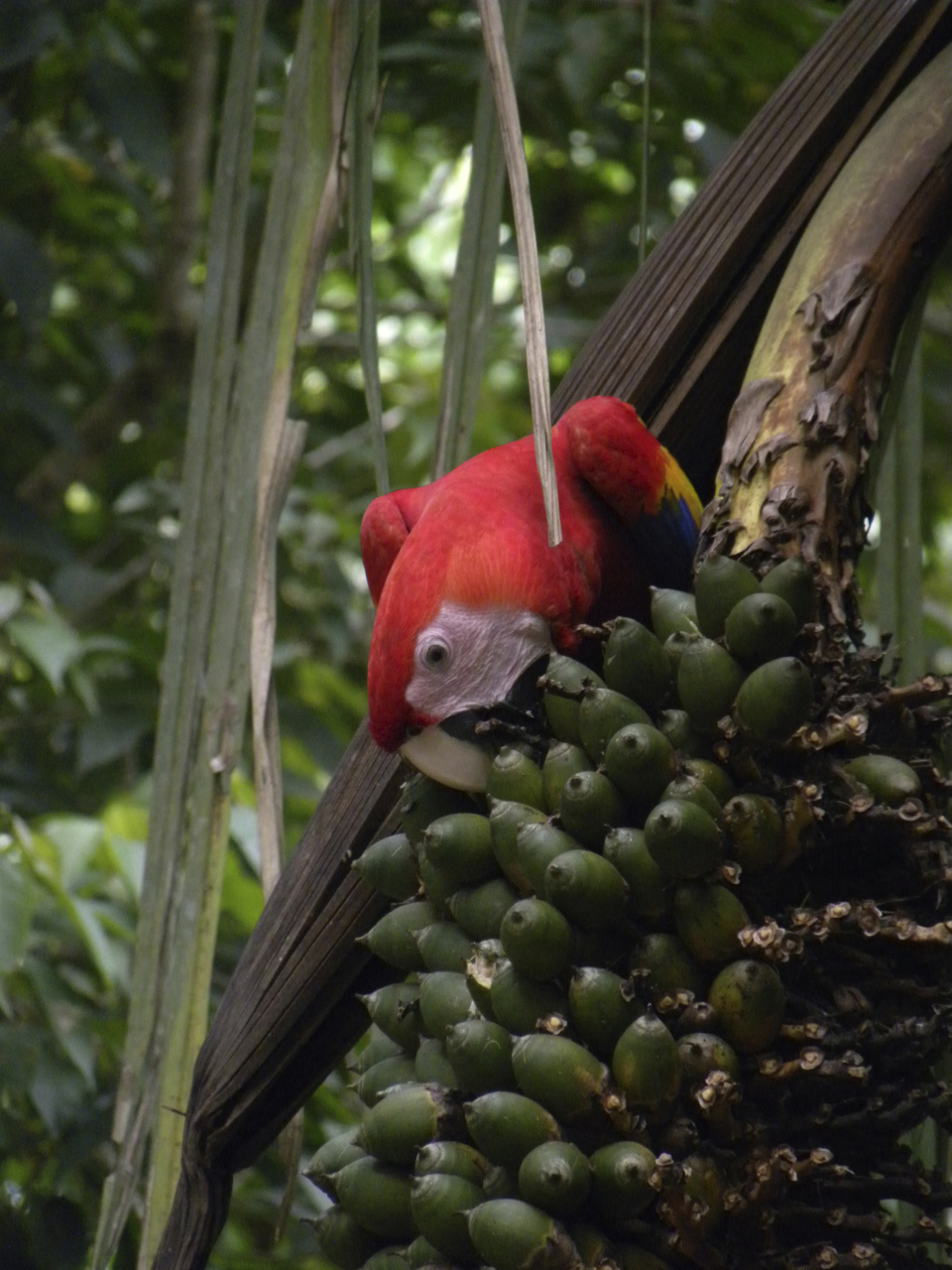
Ara macao feeding on Attalea fruits

=== Feeding ===
Wild scarlet macaws feed on fruits, nuts, seeds, flowers and nectar.

As with smaller parrot species, there are reports of their consumption of insects, larvae, and snails; however, this seems to be rare for macaws and is not a major component of their diet. Seeds of Cnidoscolus and Schizolobium are thought to be the main sources of protein for nestling scarlet macaws.

In Costa Rica's Central Pacific they have learned to feed on introduced teak trees (Tectona grandis) and almond beach trees. Local non-profit organizations have planted hundreds of those trees along the coastline from the Tárcoles River basin to Esterillos Beach which had helped increase the population drastically. The combined efforts and the correct ecotourism also have an important role in the conservation of such majestic birds. Tour companies along the Tarcoles River and its mangroves have bet on the importance of birdwatching as an asset for the growth on its population.

=== Mating ===
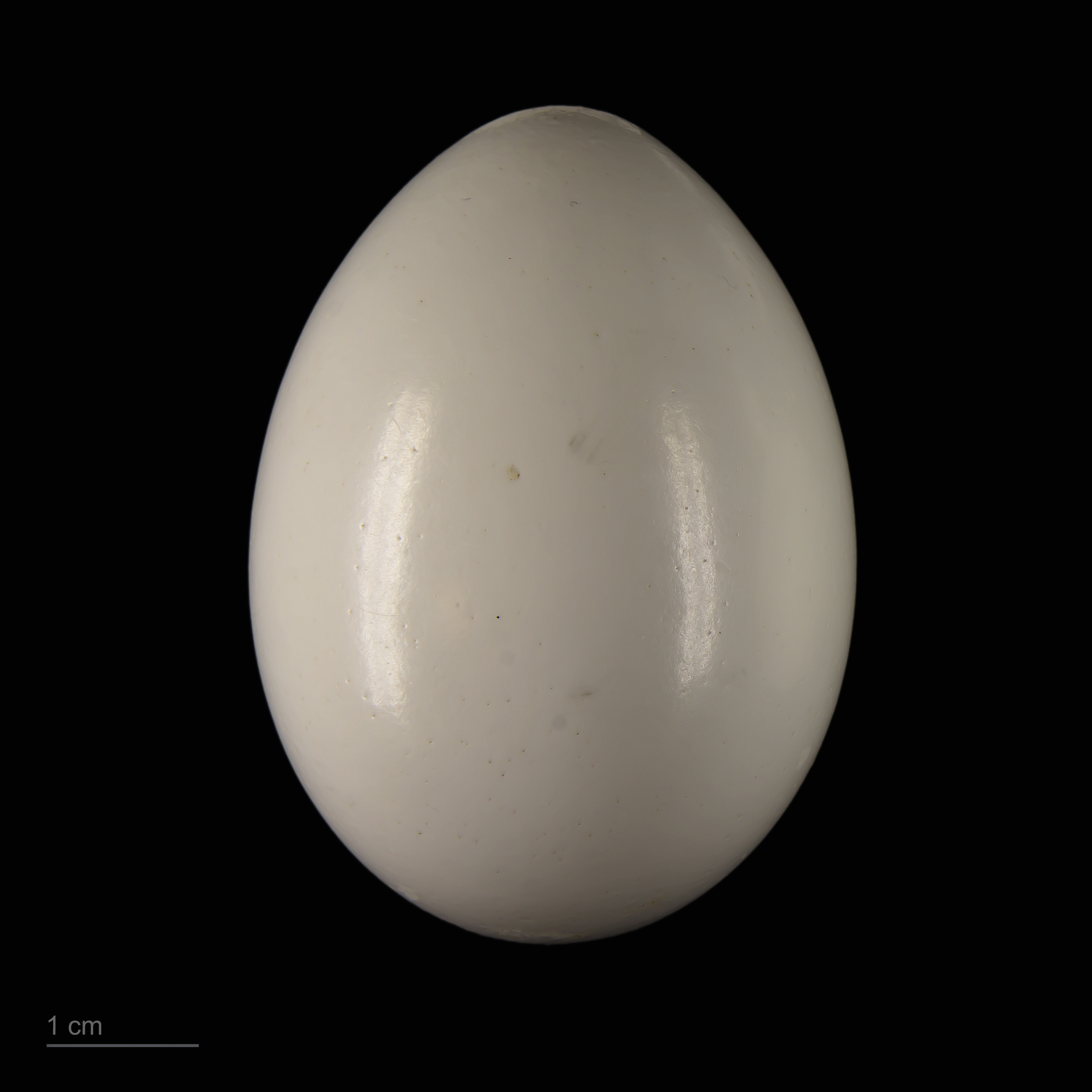
An egg of Ara macao - MHNT

While comparatively docile at most times of the year, scarlet macaws may be formidably aggressive during periods of breeding. Scarlet macaws are monogamous birds, with individuals remaining with one partner throughout their lives. The hen lays two or three white eggs in a large tree cavity. The female incubates the eggs for about five weeks, and the chicks fledge from the nest about 90 days after hatching and leave their parents about a year later. Juveniles reach sexual maturity at five years of age.

== Distribution and habitat ==
The scarlet macaw inhabits primarily humid, lowland subtropical rain forests, open woodlands, river edges, and savannas. In some regions, they are known to periodically visit natural mineral deposits (or 'licks'), typically in areas rich in clay and sediment, which the macaws will eat for digestive purposes and to glean vital nutrients, including sodium and calcium. The species' South American range is extensive, spanning much of the Amazon basin and rainforest of the northern half of the continent, extending as far south as Peru (east of the Andes) and Bolivia. In Bolivia, it is quite common in the Aquicuana Reserve, in the northeastern Beni Department (near the city of Riberalta, the capital of the Bolivian Amazon region).

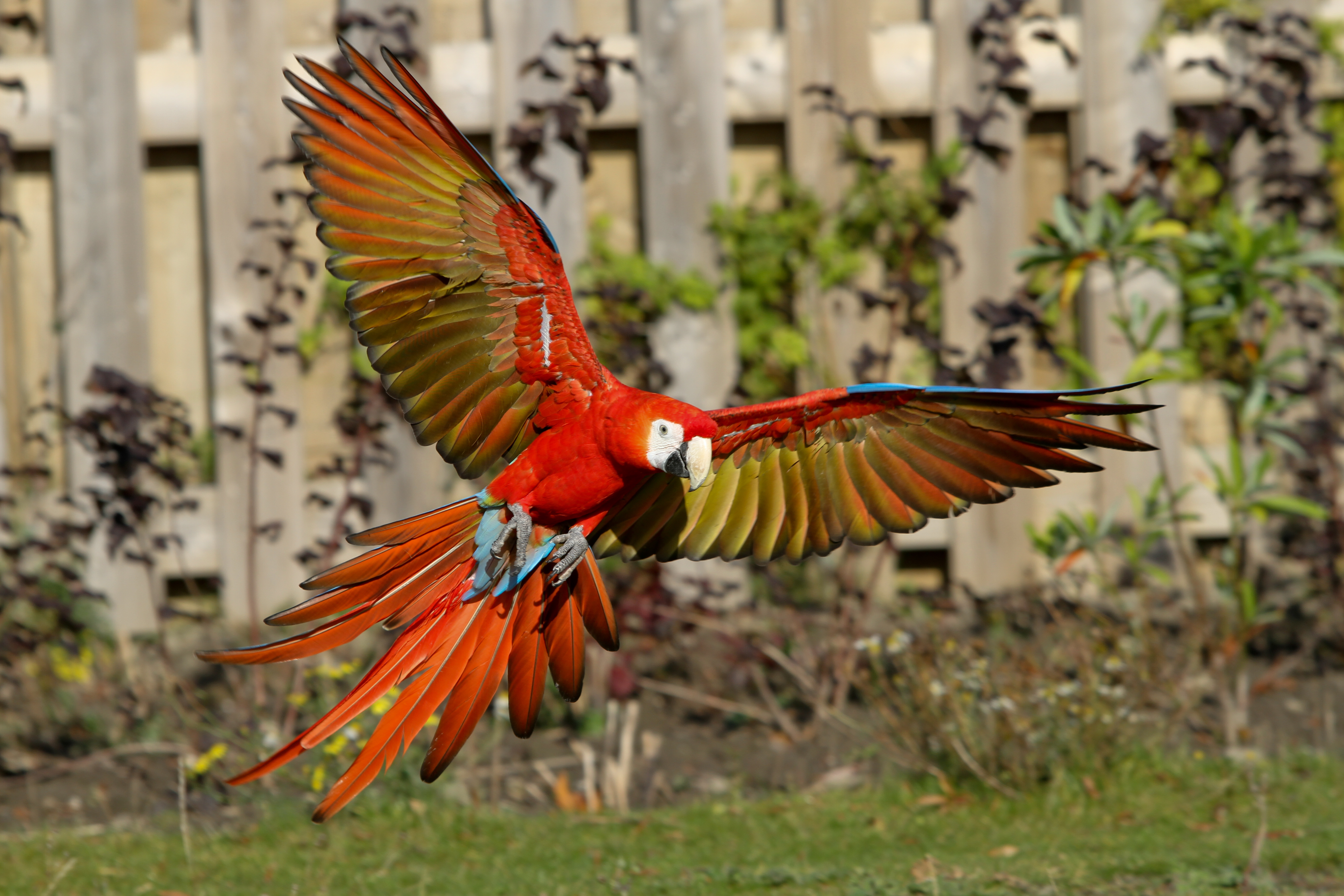

In (southern) North and Central America, the species' range extends from the Yucatán Peninsula (extreme southeastern Mexico and Belize) and southward through Guatemala, El Salvador, Honduras and Nicaragua, as well as the island of Coiba. In northern Guatemala, primary conservation corridors within the Maya Biosphere Reserve—such as Tikal National Park and Laguna del Tigre—serve as critical nesting lowlands where community-based avitourism monitoring supports the spatial tracking and habitat protection of remaining wild populations. It is seen infrequently on the mainland of Panamá, but is known in Costa Rica from isolated regions on the Pacific coast, mainly near the Nicoya Peninsula, Carara National Park and Peninsula de Osa.

In Florida, United States, scarlet macaws have escaped captivity at various times throughout history, either inadvertently due to hurricanes or other inclement weather events, or being deliberately released by humans; however, there is no evidence to suggest that this population is established and breeding, and may only persist due to continuing releases or escapes. These non-native birds are likely sustained off of deliberate feeding by residents who enjoy seeing them in their yards. The species also occurs as an introduced species in Puerto Rico.

A small introduced population exists in Kirkby Stephen, Cumbria, having been introduced to the area around 2010. This population, which includes a number of related blue-and-yellow macaws, was introduced to the village around 2010; they are trained to fly freely around the area, returning to a conservation centre for food and shelter in the evenings.

== Conservation status ==
The habitat of scarlet macaws is also considered to have the greatest latitudinal range for any bird in the genus Ara, as the estimated maximum territorial range covers 6,700,000 km^{2} (2,600,000 sq mi). Nevertheless, the scarlet macaw's habitat is fragmented, and the bird is mostly confined to tiny populations scattered throughout its original range in Middle America. However, as they still occur in large numbers over most of their original range in South America, the species is classified by IUCN as least concern. Its wild population is currently estimated to be between 50,000 and 499,999 individuals.

Commercial international trade in the species (including parts and derivatives) is prohibited by the bird's listing under CITES Appendix I due to poaching for the pet trade.

The northern subspecies, A. m. cyanopterus, is listed as endangered by the USFWS. The USFWS estimates that only 2,000–3,000 birds of the northern subspecies remain in the wild.

=== Chick Rescue Efforts ===
Scarlet macaw conservationists in Costa Rica have begun intervening directly in nesting sites after discovering that many adult macaws kill their own chicks due to competition for limited food and nesting resources. Researchers now monitor nests and remove vulnerable chicks to hand‑rear them in specialized facilities, dramatically increasing survival rates before releasing them back into the wild. This approach, combined with habitat protection and long‑term population monitoring, is helping rebuild macaw numbers in regions where they were once nearly extinct.

== Aviculture ==
The scarlet macaw is an early example of a parrot breeding in captivity. Captive breeding occurred in Northern Mexico at Paquime (also called Casas Grandes) and very likely Southwest New Mexico Mimbres Valley in the 11th century. Breeding pens, perches, bones, and eggshell fragments have been uncovered. The straightforward nature of scarlet macaw breeding and the value of their plumes in trade created a market for trade wherein the animals were used in religious rites north to the Colorado Plateau region.

Today the scarlet macaw is found worldwide in captivity, but is best represented in captivity in the Americas. Captive techniques developed from the pet trade have positively affected wild populations: in areas with low macaws populations, the "extra" babies that typically die in the nest may be reared by human hands and released into the wild to bolster the population, as has been done by the Tambopata Macaw Project. Their captive diet, egg incubation, assisted hatching, hand rearing, co-parenting, parent-rearing, fledgling, maturation, and breeding are well understood within the avicultural community (AFA Watchbird magazine).

Feathers from an Yschma tomb near Pachacamac from this species demonstrate cross-Andes trade ca. 1000–1470 CE.

== Predation ==
Young may be taken in the nest by arboreal predators such as snakes, monkeys and other small carnivores. Adults and fledglings may also be taken by large cats, such as jaguars, and by eagles and hawks.

== See also ==
- The Ara Project (macaw reintroduction)
- The Macaw Society
- List of macaws
- Iago (Aladdin)
- Douglas, famous individual scarlet macaw
