= Punta Gorda Natural Reserve =

Nature reserve in Nicaragua

Punta Gorda Natural Reserve is a nature reserve in Nicaragua. It is one of the 78 reserves that are under official protection in the country.
