= Vitex gigantea =

Scientific classification
- Kingdom: Plantae
- Clade: Tracheophytes
- Clade: Angiosperms
- Clade: Eudicots
- Clade: Asterids
- Order: Lamiales
- Family: Lamiaceae
- Genus: Vitex
- Species: V. gigantea

Binomial name
- Vitex gigantea Kunth

Species of tree

Vitex gigantea is a species of tree in the family Lamiaceae. It is native to Panama and South America.
