= Dipteryx oleifera =

Scientific classification
- Kingdom: Plantae
- Clade: Tracheophytes
- Clade: Angiosperms
- Clade: Eudicots
- Clade: Rosids
- Order: Fabales
- Family: Fabaceae
- Subfamily: Faboideae
- Genus: Dipteryx
- Species: D. oleifera

Binomial name
- Dipteryx oleifera Benth.

Synonyms
- Coumarouna oleifera (Benth.) Taub.; Coumarouna panamensis Pittier; Dipteryx panamensis (Pittier) Record & Mell; Oleiocarpon panamense (Pittier) Dwyer

Species of tree

Dipteryx oleifera (syns. Dipteryx panamensis and Coumarouna panamensis), the tonka bean, eboe, choibá, or almendro tree (almond in Spanish), is a species of emergent rainforest tree up to 55 m (180 ft) tall in the family Fabaceae (the subfamily Papilionoideae), native to Honduras, Nicaragua, Costa Rica, Panama, Colombia, and Ecuador.

A valuable hardwood timber tree, its almond-flavored seeds are edible and sold in local markets. Its seedpods are so oily that locals use them as torches. It has "great potential" as an ornamental due to its spectacular bloom of pink flowers which lasts for weeks, and is used as a street tree in Medellín, Colombia. The flowers are followed by green fruit up to 6 cm (2.4 in) with seeds which are a critical food item for the great green macaw (Ara ambigua).

Remarkably, this species has been identified as benefiting from being struck by lightning: it is almost undamaged while its parasitic vines and nearby competitors are killed. The trees’ unusual height and wide crown make them up to 68 percent more likely to be struck by lightning relative to other similar trees, and trees living near a large almendro tree are 48 percent more likely to be killed by lightning than those living near another species.
