= Río San Juan Wildlife Refuge =

Nature reserve in Nicaragua

Río San Juan Wildlife Refuge is a nature reserve in Nicaragua. It is one of the 78 reserves which are officially under protection in the country. It consists of 430 km^{2} (170 sq mi).

As of 2009 it is one of only two places in Nicaragua where the toad Incilius melanochlorus has been recorded. The world's only freshwater shark, Nicaragua shark, known elsewhere in the world as the bull shark or Zambesi shark is also present in the San Juan River. Nicaragua has recently banned freshwater shark fishing because of population declines.
