= Maquenque National Wildlife Refuge =

Protected area in Costa Rica

- Refugio de Vida Silvestre Maquenque
- Location within Costa Rica
- Location: Costa Rica
- Nearest city: Puerto Viejo de Sarapiquí, Pital
- Coordinates: 10.70°N 84.15°W
- Area: 518.61 km^{2} (200.24 sq mi)
- Established: 2005
- Governing body: National System of Conservation Areas (SINAC)

Ramsar Wetland
- Official name: Humedal Maquenque
- Designated: 22 May 2010
- Reference no.: 1918

Maquenque Wildlife Refuge (Spanish: Refugio de Vida Silvestre Maquenque), is a protected area in Costa Rica, managed under the Arenal Huetar Norte Conservation Area, it was created in 2005 by decree 32405-MINAE.

It connects Tortuguero National Park and La Selva Biological Station in the Cordillera Central in Costa Rica, with the Barra del Colorado Wildlife Refuge, the Indio-Maíz Biological Reserve, Punta Gorda Natural Reserve and the Cerro Silva Natural Reserve in Nicaragua, thereby allowing animals to move between the regions. This region is now known as the San Juan-La Selva Biological Corridor, located between the San Carlos River and the Sarapiquí River and other areas near the Nicaraguan border.

The nearest towns and villages are Puerto Viejo de Sarapiquí and Pital.

== History ==
The refuge was created in 2005 from existing reserves such as El Jardín Hill Forest Reserve (Spanish: Reserva Forestal Cerro El Jardín), Cureña Forest Reserve (Spanish: Reserva Forestal Cureña), Laguna Maquenque Wetlands (Spanish: Humedal Laguna Maquenque) and the Tamborcito Lacustrine Wetlands (Spanish: Humedal Lacustrino Tamborcito), which were deprecated and assimilated into the current refuge.

In 1998 a number of ornithologists proposed creating a new national park in this area, in order to help link other existing neighbouring areas in Costa Rica and Nicaragua, and thus protect the great green macaw population. Instead, the Costa Rican government created a wildlife refuge in 2005.

The concept of this area as a biological corridor was already proposed in 1985 by the first revolutionary Sandinista government as the "Sistema Internacional de Areas Protegidas para la Paz" (SI-A-PAZ). It became Ramsar Site 1918 in 2010. The area is administratively part of the Arenal Huetar Norte Conservation Area.

== Habitats ==
It features a very wet, non-seasonal, evergreen rainforest environment with a yearly precipitation of 3,000-3,600mm. 70.21% is primary forest, 6.17% is secondary forest or scrubland, and 20.13% is devoted to agriculture. There are many epiphytes, vines and climbing plants, and a dense understory.

The reserve included wetlands and protected an example of the virgin tropical moist forest that once blanketed the territory alongside the San Juan River.

It also has a lake complex and palustrine ecosystems. The lake complex consists of at least four major lakes: Canacas, Colpachi, Maquenque and Tamborcito.

== Species ==
=== Flora ===
The permanently inundated swamps are home to stands of the palm Raphia taedigera and are surrounded by thickets of species in the family Melastomataceae. Other plants associated with this habitat are the trees Vochysia ferruginea and Pentaclethra macroloba and the palm Socratea exorrhiza. Pachira aquatica grows in this habitat in more inland swamps. Zygia confusa borders lakes in dense stands. Dry land contains large amounts of almendro trees (Dipteryx oleifera), a favoured food source of the great green macaw, which may grow to 60m high. Another emergent tree is Ceiba pentandra. Other common trees here are Calophyllum brasiliense, Vochysia ferruginea, Pentaclethra macroloba and the palm Socratea exorrhiza. Intermediate succession lowland woodlands are home to the threatened taxa Carapa guianensis, Terminalia amazonica, Minquartia guianensis and Qualea paraensis. Non-native trees in secondary woodland are primarily Gmelina arborea, teak Tectona grandis and Terminalia ivorensis (locally known as acacia). Endangered plants include the conifer Podocarpus guatemalensis and the trees Cedrela fissilis, Sclerolobium costarricense, Platymiscium pinnatum and Hymenolobium mesoamericanum. Rare endemic plants include Quararibea pumila, Trichilia adolfi and Vochysia allenii. Rare plants furthermore include Aspidosperma spruceanum, and threatened lowland trees Handroanthus guayacan, Ceiba pentandra, Sideroxylon capiri, Copaifera aromatica, Dalbergia glomerata, D. melanocardium, Prioria copaifera, Terminalia oblonga and the very uncommon Cynometra retusa.

Lake Canaca is surrounded by tall trees of Pentaclethra macroloba, Vochysia ferruginea and Dialum guianense, the bush Palicourea tomentosa, and smaller trees of Calophyllum brasiliense, Cespedesia macrophylla, Couma macrocarpa and Virola koschnyi. The palm Raphia taedigera is dominant, and the palms Socratea exorrhiza and Welfia regia grow here too.

Lake Colpachi has the large trees Brosimum utile, Inga alba, Pentaclethra macroloba, Vochysia ferruginea and Pouteria durlandii surrounding it, interspersed with smaller trees of Alibertia atlantica, Byrsonima crispa, Casearia arborea, Cordia bicolor, Croton smithianus, C. schiedeanus, Ferdinandusa panamensis, Laetia procera, Stryphnodendron microstachyum, Vismia macrophylla and the pioneer tree species Simarouba amara, Tapirira guianensis and Jacaranda copaia in former clearings, and shrubs of Zygia confusa. Invasive species include Gmelina arborea.

Lake Maquenque is fringed with shrubs of Zygia confusa, the large herbaceous Maranthes panamensis, the shrubs Miconia punctata and Mouriri gleasoniana, the walking palm (Socratea exorrhiza), the smallish trees Virola sebifera, Byrsonima crispa, Eschweilera costaricensis and E. panamensis, and large trees of Terminalia amazonica, Pentaclethra macroloba and Vochysia ferruginea.

Lake Tamborcito has in its surroundings the tall trees Brosimum utile, Pentaclethra macroloba, Swartzia maquenqueana and Vochysia ferruginea, the smaller trees Eschweilera costaricensis, |E. panamensis, Ferdinandusa panamensis, Laetia procera, Licania affinis and L. belloi, the smallish pioneer tree species Jacaranda copaia, Simarouba amara and Tapirira guianensis, the palm Socratea exorrhiza, and the shrubs Hirtella media, Miconia punctata and Mouriri gleasoniana. Rare plants include Elaeoluma glabrescens and Vantanea barbourii.

Fifty meters from the lakes the following plants have been recorded as food plants for the great green macaw: the palms Iriartea deltoidea, Raphia taedigera, Socratea exorrhiza and Welfia regia, the large shrub Solanum rugosum, the emergent trees Balizia elegans and Dipteryx oleifera, the trees Byrsonima crispa, Cespedesia macrophylla, Croton schiedeanus, Dialum guianense, Guarea rhopalocarpa, Laetia procera, Pentaclethra macroloba, Qualea paraensis, Sacoglottis tricogyna, Vantanea barbourii, Virola koschnyi, Virola sebifera and Vochysia ferruginea.

=== Fauna ===
==== Fish ====
There have been 80 fish species registered as of 2008. The bobo mullet (Joturus pichardi), Brachyrhaphis olomina, knife livebearer fish (Alfaro cultratus) and the tetra (Astyanax fasciatus) are quite common. The endangered tropical gar (Atractosteus tropicus), known locally as pez gaspar, occurs here. The large bull shark (Carcharhinus leucas) and the sawfish Pristis pristis and P. pectinata can also occur. An endemic fish species is Priapichtys annectens, found at a range of altitudes here. Threatened fish species include Cynodonichthys isthmensis and Dajaus monticola. Other fish include the common snook (Centropomus undecimalis) and the chiclids Parachromis dovii, Parachromis loisellei, Parachromis managuensis and Hypsophrys nicaraguensis.

==== Amphibians ====
The following amphibians, all considered threatened in Costa Rica, occur here (as of 2001): the caecilians Dermophis parviceps and Gymnopis multiplicata, the toad Bufo melanochloris, the low elevation glass frogs Sachatamia ilex, Teratohyla spinosa and Centrolenella magna, the endemic glass frog Hyalinobatrachium vireovittatum restricted to higher elevations, the low elevation poison dart frogs Dendrobates auratus, D. pumilio and Phyllobates lugubris, the salamanders Bolitoglossa alvaradoi and B. arborescandens both endemics found only in the higher elevations and B. colonnea in the canopy at all elevations, and the salamanders Oedipina alfaroi (endemic), O. carablanca (endemic), O. collaris and O. cyclocauda at low elevations. Threatened tree frogs include the high elevation Hyla colymba, H. miliaria, H. rufioculis (endemic) and the endangered Agalychnis annae, the low elevation A. calcarifer and A. saltator and those tree frogs with no particular elevation preferences: A. lemur, Hyla microcephala and the spiny-headed tree frog (Anotheca spinosa). There are particularly many rare species of rain frogs including Eleutherodactylus altae with low to mid elevation preferences, E. andi (mid elevations), the endemic E. angelicus of mid to higher elevations, the low elevation E. biporcatus, E. fleischmanni from mid to very high elevations, E. gollmeri from low to mid elevations, the low elevation E. mimus, E. noblei from low to mid elevations, E. podiciferus from mid to high elevations and E. rugosus with no particular elevation preferences.

==== Reptiles ====
Crocodilians are represented by the endangered American crocodile (Crocodylus acutus) and in reduced numbers the caiman Caiman crocodilus. Turtles include the Central American mud turtle (Kinosternon angustipons) and the locally endangered common snapping turtle (Chelydra serpentina). Snakes include Boa constrictor, the endemic Sibon argus, the endemic earth snake Geophis ruthveni and the pit viper-eating mussurana (Clelia clelia). Other boas are the small Ungaliophis panamensis, and the larger Corallus annulatus ssp. annulatus and rainbow boa (Epicrates cenchria). Tropical ground snakes include Trimetopon gracile, T. pliolepis, T. simile and T. viquezi, all endemics to Costa Rica. Lizards include the green iguana (Iguana iguana), the endemic Yautepec tropical night lizard (Lepidophyma reticulatum), the gecko Thecadactylus rapicauda, Ptychoglossus plicatus, Celestus hylaeus (endemic) and the anoles Polychrus gutturosus, Norops carpenteri, N. fungosus, N. lemurinus, N. pentaprion, N. sericeus, Dactyloa frenata and D. insignis.

==== Birds ====
Endangered birds include the great green macaw, the stork Jabiru mycteria, sungrebe (Heliornis fulica), the motmot Electron carinatum and the scarlet macaw which is reasonably common here. Other parrots considered locally threatened which occur are Amazona autumnalis and A. farinosa. An uncommon bird is the rufous-vented ground cuckoo (Neomorphus geoffroyi ssp. salvini). Other birds include dusky antbird (Cercomacroides tyrannina), rufescent tiger-Heron (Tigrisoma lineatum), keel-billed toucan (Ramphastos sulfuratus), Psittacara finschi parakeets, scaled pigeon (Patagioenas speciosa), the doves Geotrygon violacea and G. veraguensis, the hummingbird Lophornis helenae, the threatened South American bittern (Botaurus pinnatus) and least bittern (Ixobrychus exilis), the vulnerable agami heron (Agamia agami), sunbittern (Eurypyga helias), Muscovy duck (Cairina moschata), masked duck (Nomonyx dominicus), the trogon Trogon clathratus , the quetzal Pharomachrus mocinno at higher altitudes, the green-and-rufous kingfisher (Chloroceryle inda) and the great jacamar (Jacamerops aureus) at the lowest altitudes, the motmot Hylomanes momotula, the locally threatened green ibis (Mesembrinibis cayennensis) and roseate spoonbill (Platalea ajaja), and the locally threatened tinamous Tinamus major and Crypturellus boucardi ssp. costaricensis. The only bird endemic to Costa Rica found here is the hummingbird Orcha cupreiceps.

Locally endangered birds of prey include the solitary eagle (Buteogallus solitarius), the harpy eagle (Harpia harpyja), the eagle Morphnus guianensis, the hawk-eagle Spizastur melanoleucus, red-throated caracara (Ibycter americanus) and the falcon Falco deiroleucus. Locally threatened birds of prey include the falcons F. peregrinus and Micrastur mirandollei, the king vulture (Sarcoramphus papa), crested owl (Lophostrix cristata), hook-billed kite (Chondrohierax uncinatus), snail kite (Rostrhamus sociabilis), fishing hawk Busarellus nigricollis, tiny hawk (Accipiter superciliosus), semiplumbeous hawk (Leucopternis semiplumbeus), great black hawk (Buteogallus urubitinga), crane hawk (Geranospiza caerulescens) and the hawk-eagles Spizaetus ornatus and S. tyrannus.

Galliformes include the vulnerable great curassow (Crax rubra), the threatened crested guan (Penelope purpurascens) and the quails Odontophorus melanotis and Rhynchortyx cinctus.

Passerine birds which occur here and are rare for Costa Rica are the yellow-tailed oriole (Icterus mesomelas), tawny-chested flycatcher (Aphanotriccus capitalis), lovely cotinga (Cotinga amabilis), strong-billed woodcreeper (Xiphocolaptes promeropirhynchus); the mid-elevation brown-billed scythebill (Campylorhamphus pusillus) and long-tailed woodcreeper (Deconychura longicauda); the speckled mourner (Laniocera rufescens), Piprites griseiceps, Carpodectes nitidus and Lanio leucothorax at lower altitudes; and the three-wattled bellbird (Procnias tricarunculatus) and bare-necked umbrellabird (Cephalopterus glabricollis) usually found at higher altitudes.

==== Mammals ====
As of 1997 mammals included endangered manatees, the paca Cuniculus paca, the agouti Dasyprocta punctata, the squirrel Sciurus deppei, the nationally uncommon opossum Metachirus nudicaudatus, the locally endangered giant anteater (Myrmecophaga tridactyla), silky anteater (Cyclopes didactylus), the locally reduced Hoffmann's two-toed sloth (Choloepus hoffmanni), brown-throated sloth (Bradypus variegatus), the locally threatened armadillo (Cabassous centralis), jaguar (Panthera onca), puma (Puma concolor), jaguarundi (Herpailurus yagouaroundi), margay (Leopardus wiedii), ocelot (Leopardus pardalis), cacomistle (Bassariscus sumichrasti), olingo (Bassaricyon gabbii), grison (Galictis vittata), the locally endangered otter Lontra longicaudis, tapir (Tapirus bairdii), the deer Mazama americana and Odocoileus virginianus, and both the locally endangered white-lipped peccary and the collared peccary. Monkeys included the locally endangered howler monkey Alouatta palliata, the spider monkey Ateles geoffroyi and the locally uncommon Cebus imitator, White-nosed coati, Bats included the vampire bat Vampyrum spectrum , and only at low elevations the rare Cyttarops alecto, the rare disk-winged bat Thyroptera discifera, the very rare Micronycteris daviesi and the uncommon Caribbean white tent-making bat (Ectophylla alba).

== Socioeconomic activities ==
The nearby town of Boca Tapada in Pital, has an abundance of ecolodges,.

Land surrounding the area is either wooded or used for agriculture. Cattle ranching is important, as are hundreds of pineapple and sugar cane plantations. Other crops are bananas, heart of palm, plantains and cassava. Due to the wildlife refuge status, development is restricted for the residents.
