= Bactris polystachya =

Conservation status
- Vulnerable (IUCN 3.1)

Scientific classification
- Kingdom: Plantae
- Clade: Embryophytes
- Clade: Tracheophytes
- Clade: Spermatophytes
- Clade: Angiosperms
- Clade: Monocots
- Clade: Commelinids
- Order: Arecales
- Family: Arecaceae
- Genus: Bactris
- Species: B. polystachya

Binomial name
- Bactris polystachya H.Wendl. ex Grayum

Species of flowering plant

Bactris polystachya is a species of flowering plant in the family Arecaceae. It is a shrub or tree with spiny stems, compound leaves, and orange fruits. The species is endemic to Costa Rica.

The name Bactris polystachya was first used in 1857, though it was not validated until 1999. The species is listed as Vulnerable by the IUCN.

== Taxonomy ==
In 1857, Hermann Wendland became the first botanist to collect specimens of Bactris polystachya, though he published the name invalidly. It remained a nomen nudum until Michael Howard Grayum validated the name in 1999.

Grayum listed Bactris caudata, Bactris grayumii, and Bactris longiseta as probably close relatives of Bactris polystachya.

== Distribution ==
Bactris polystachya is endemic to the wet tropical biome of Costa Rica. It grows mainly in northern Costa Rica, and has en estimated extent of occurrence of 6,126 square kilometres (2,365 sq mi).

The species grows in lowland tropical rainforests, on the Atlantic slope of the Cordillera de Guanacaste, and on nearby coastal plains, at elevations up to 700 metres (2,300 ft).

== Description ==
Bactris polystachya is a shrub or tree. The stems are spiny, 3–6 metres (9.8–19.7 ft) tall, and 2–2.5 centimetres (0.79–0.98 in) wide. The leaf stems are 14–49 centimetres (5.5–19.3 in) long. The leaves are compound, 1.35 metres (4.4 ft) long, and have fifteen to thirty-one regularly spaced pinnae on each side.

The inflorescence stem is curved, around 10 centimetres (3.9 in) long, and has a spiny bract. The male flowers are 4–5 millimetres (0.16–0.20 in) long, and the female flowers are 2.5–3 millimetres (0.098–0.118 in) long. The calyx is nearly as long as the corolla.

The fruits are oblate to obovoid, orange when ripe, 1.5–1.8 centimetres (0.59–0.71 in) long, and 1.5–1.8 centimetres (0.59–0.71 in) wide. The plant fruits in August and November.

Bactris polystachya is similar to Bactris major, though the latter has thinner leaflets, longer inflorescence stems, and purplish fruits.

== Conservation ==
In 2020, the IUCN assessed Bactris polystachya as Vulnerable. It is threatened by deforestation and habitat loss, including for the cultivation of pineapples. The species is present in protected areas, including the Barra del Colorado Wildlife Refuge, the Maquenque National Wildlife Refuge, and Braulio Carrillo National Park.
