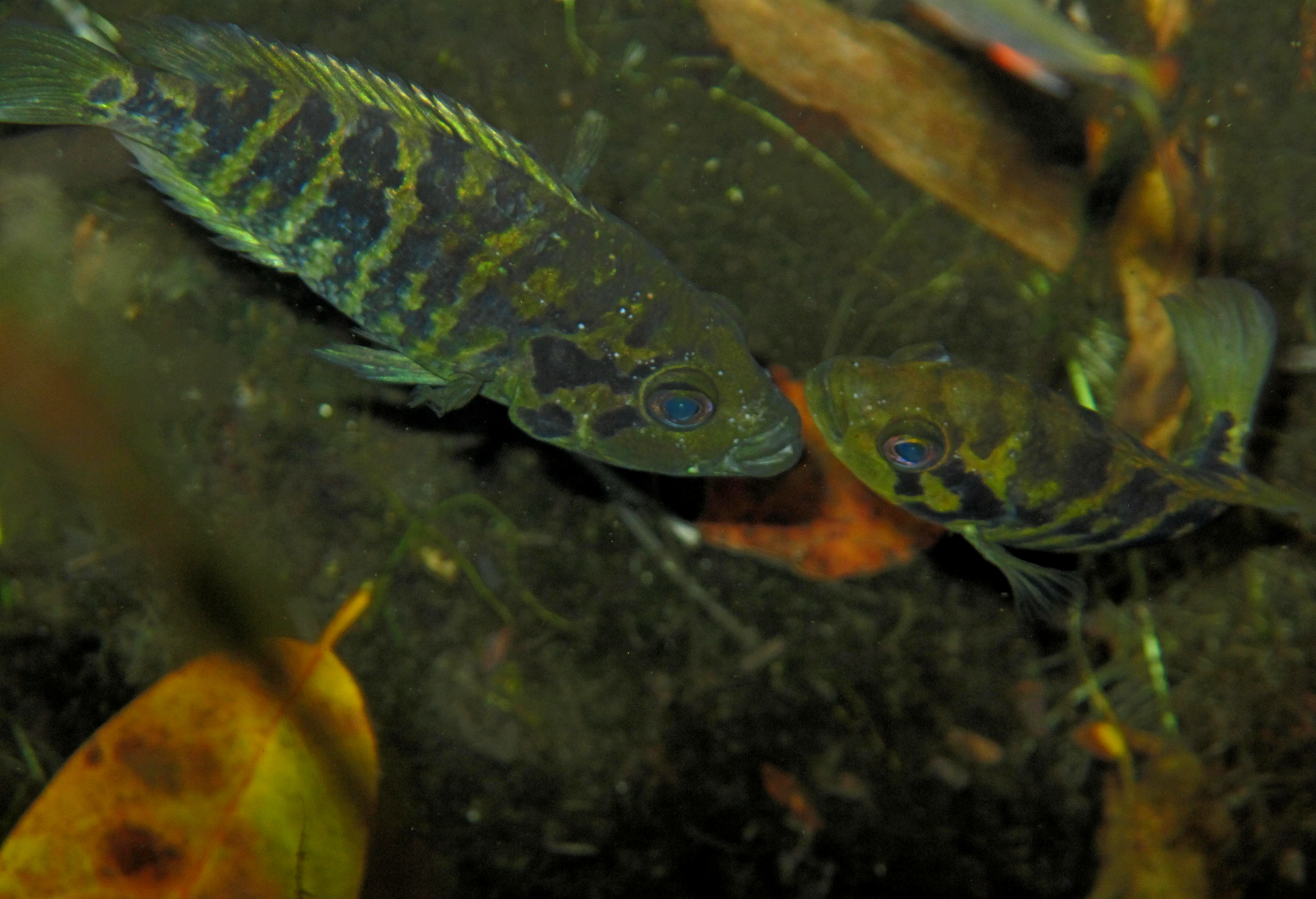

Conservation status
- Least Concern (IUCN 3.1)

Scientific classification
- Kingdom: Animalia
- Phylum: Chordata
- Class: Actinopterygii
- Order: Cichliformes
- Family: Cichlidae
- Genus: Parachromis
- Species: P. friedrichsthalii

Binomial name
- Parachromis friedrichsthalii (Heckel, 1840)

Synonyms
- Heros friedrichsthalii Heckel, 1840; Astronotus friedrichsthalii (Heckel, 1840); Cichlasoma friedrichsthalii (Heckel, 1840); Parapetenia friedrichsthalii (Heckel, 1840); Cichlosoma multifasciatum Regan, 1905; Cichlasoma multifasciatum Regan, 1905; Parapetenia multifasciata (Regan, 1905)

= Parachromis friedrichsthalii =

Species of cichlid fish

Parachromis friedrichsthalii, the yellowjacket cichlid, is a species of cichlid native to Central America, where it is found along the Atlantic Slope from western Honduras to northern Guatemala. This species grows to a length of 28 centimetres (11 in) SL. This species is popular with anglers as a gamefish and can also be found in the aquarium trade. The specific name honours the Austrian explorer, botanist and archaeologist Emanuel von Friedrichsthal (1809-1842), who sent many specimens to Vienna from Central America, including the type of this fish.

P. friedrichsthalii has an unusual hunting mechanism. The species has been observed to lie immobile near the bottom, feigning death. When smaller fish approach and attempt to pick at the dead fish, P. friedrichsthalii ambush the smaller fish. Similar behaviour has also been observed in some species of Lake Malawi cichlids, particularly from the genus Nimbochromis.

== Description ==
Physically similar to other members of the genus, especially P. managuensis and P. motaguensis, P. freidrichsthalii holds the broken band which runs horizontally. The most distinct characteristic which enables the correct identification of this fish, is the golden-yellow colouration which is more prominent in this fish than the others.

However, P. loiselli also possesses such gold and yellow colouration. A distinct characteristic which enables these two fish to be easily separated is the distinctly un-broken dark band seen on P. friedrichsthalii. The dark spots which is found on P. loiselli ıs often so closely grouped that it appears to be a single solid band. P. loiselli can also be identified by its main colouration. Unlike all other members ın the genus, P. loiselli's main color is a solid yellow colouration.
