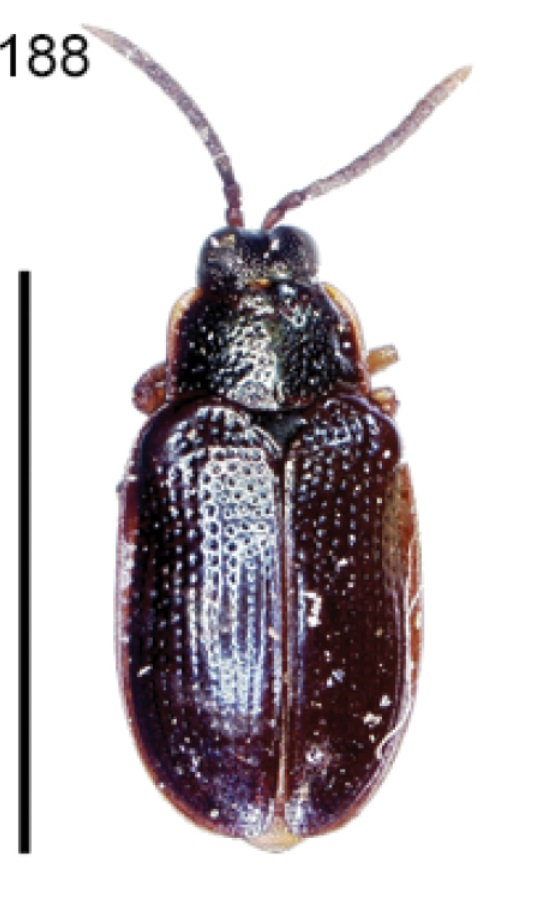

Scientific classification
- Kingdom: Animalia
- Phylum: Arthropoda
- Class: Insecta
- Order: Coleoptera
- Suborder: Polyphaga
- Infraorder: Cucujiformia
- Family: Chrysomelidae
- Genus: Cephaloleia
- Species: C. metallescens

Binomial name
- Cephaloleia metallescens Baly, 1885

= Cephaloleia metallescens =

Species of beetle

Cephaloleia metallescens is a species of beetle of the family Chrysomelidae. It is found in Costa Rica, Guatemala, Nicaragua and Panama.

== Description ==
Adults reach a length of about 3.1–3.3 mm. Adults are metallic blue. The pronotum has a paler lateral margin and the legs are yellowish-red.

== Biology ==
The recorded food plant is Bactris major and Chamaedorea wendlandiana.
