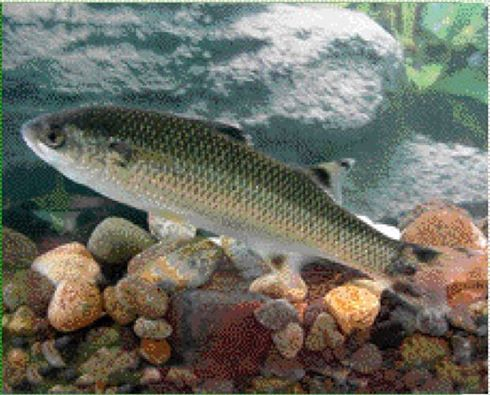

Conservation status
- Least Concern (IUCN 3.1)

Scientific classification
- Kingdom: Animalia
- Phylum: Chordata
- Class: Actinopterygii
- Order: Mugiliformes
- Family: Mugilidae
- Genus: Joturus; Poey, 1860
- Species: J. pichardi

Binomial name
- Joturus pichardi Poey, 1860

Synonyms
- Agonostoma globiceps Günther, 1874; Juturus globiceps (Günther, 1874); Joturus stipes D.S. Jordan and Gilbert, 1882

= Bobo mullet =

Species of fish

The bobo mullet (Joturus pichardi), is a species of ray-finned fish of the mullet family Mugilidae. It is the only species in the genus Joturus, one of 17 mullet genera containing altogether about 80 species of ray-finned fish. It occurs in rivers, including brackish waters, in much of the Gulf of Mexico basin from Mexico as far south as Panama and the Caribbean coast of Colombia, as well as the West Indies and the United States state of Florida. The specific name honours the Cuban lexicographer and geographer Esteban Pichardo (1799–1879).

== Distribution ==
In Costa Rica it is found in the east of the country along the Caribbean coast, especially in the north, for example in the drainages of the Parismina River, where it is not abundant, and up to 600 m (2,000 ft) in altitude in the rivers of the Maquenque National Wildlife Refuge, where it is uncommon.

== Ecology ==
It is a fish which lives in warm parts of large mountain streams, but migrates downstream (catadromy) to breed in estuaries. Fry inhabit marine waters of the estuary. It is found around large boulders in clear, swift-flowing waters when adult, sharing this habitat with Sicydium sp. (chupapiedras) and Dajaus monticola (tepemechín) in Costa Rica. It feeds on macroinvertebrates, and on algae carpeting underwater rocks.

== Uses ==
In Costa Rica it is known as bobo or pez bobo. It is fished here for subsistence consumption and sometimes commercially. It is sought for its size and good flavour.

== Conservation ==
Its migration may be interrupted by hydroelectrical projects. It has historically suffered from population decrease and overfishing in Costa Rica. It might be under threat from agricultural run-off from banana or pineapple plantations. It is not under any legal protection in Costa Rica. It is found in the Maquenque National Wildlife Refuge and Tortuguero National Park.
