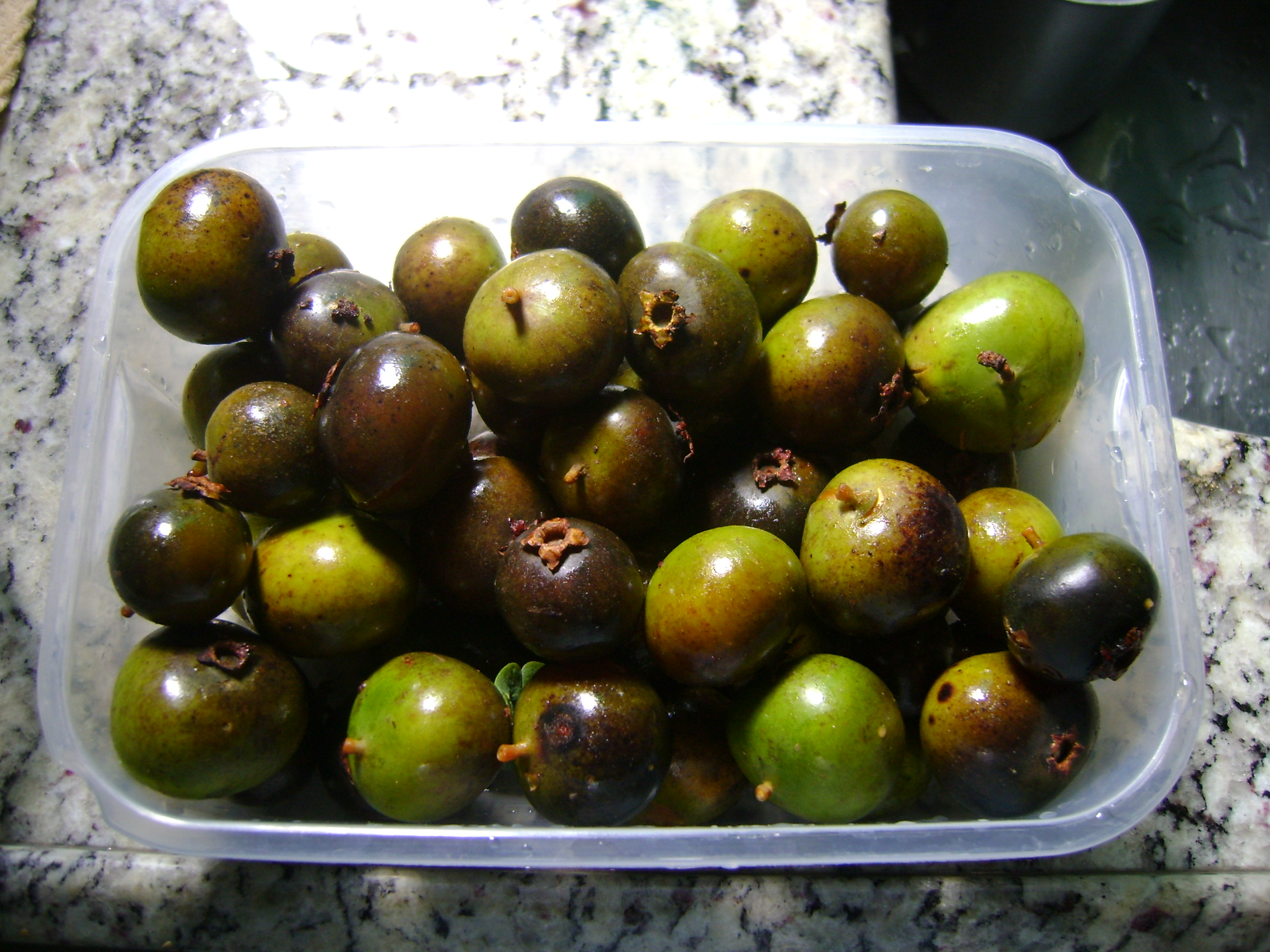
- Mouriri pusa fruits

Scientific classification
- Kingdom: Plantae
- Clade: Tracheophytes
- Clade: Angiosperms
- Clade: Eudicots
- Clade: Rosids
- Order: Myrtales
- Family: Melastomataceae
- Genus: Mouriri

= Mouriri =

Genus of flowering plants

Mouriri is a genus of plants in the family Melastomataceae.

Species include:

- Mouriri completens, (Pitt.) Burret
- Mouriri gleasoniana, Standl.
- Mouriri laxiflora, Morley
- Mouriri panamensis, Morley
- Mouriri guianensis, Aublet
