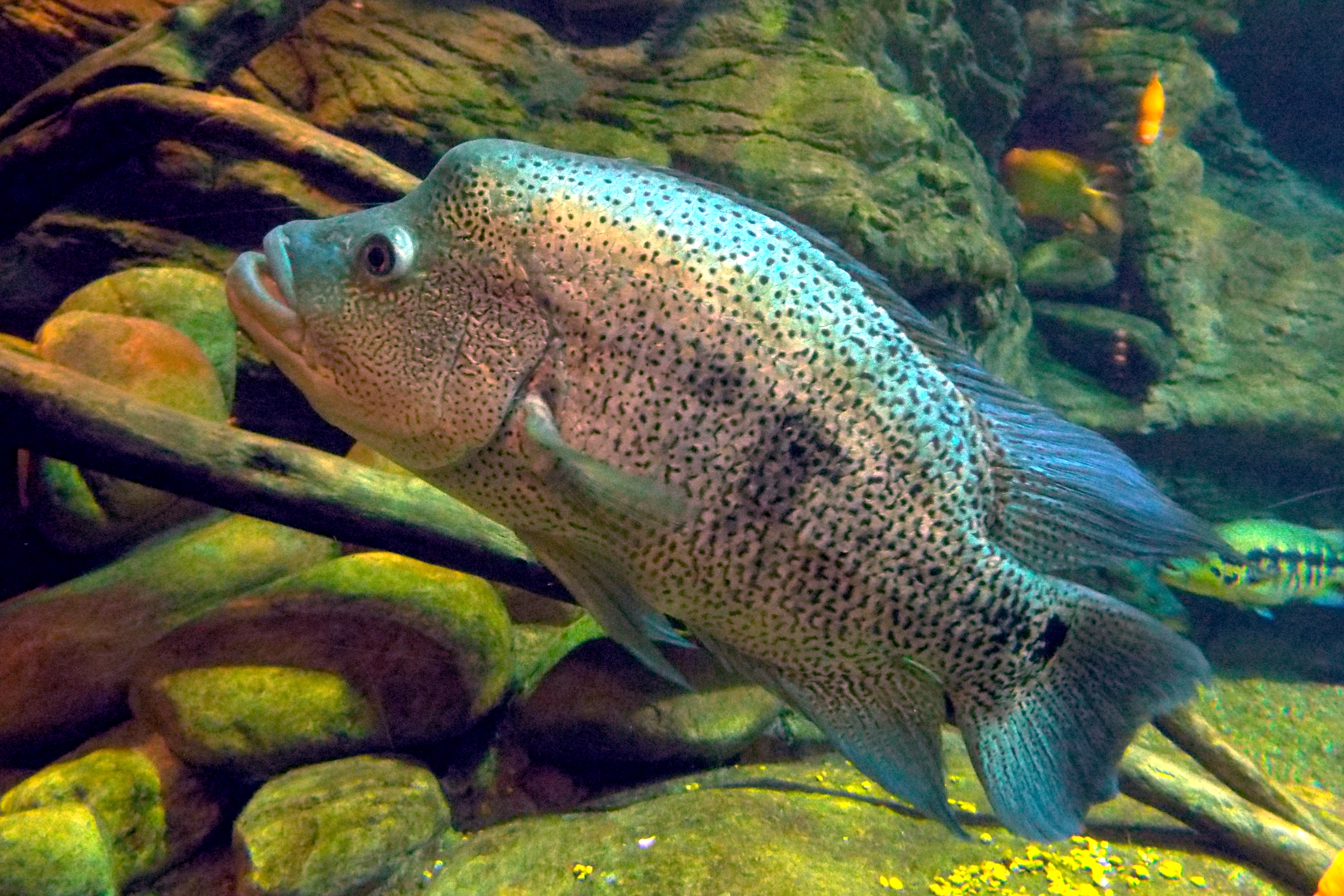
- Male Parachromis dovii at the Tennessee Aquarium

Conservation status
- Least Concern (IUCN 3.1)

Scientific classification
- Kingdom: Animalia
- Phylum: Chordata
- Class: Actinopterygii
- Order: Cichliformes
- Family: Cichlidae
- Genus: Parachromis
- Species: P. dovii

Binomial name
- Parachromis dovii (Günther, 1864)

Synonyms
- Heros dovii Günther, 1864; Cichlasoma dovii (Günther, 1864); Herichthys dovii (Günther, 1864)

= Parachromis dovii =

Species of cichlid fish

Parachromis dovii, the wolf cichlid, rainbow bass, or guapote, is a species of cichlid native to Central America, where it occurs in lakes, rivers and streams in Honduras, Nicaragua and Costa Rica. It is one of the largest cichlids, reaching up to 14 kg (31 lb) in weight and 80 cm (2.6 ft) long. A highly predatory species, it mostly feeds on other fish. P. dovii is important to local commercial fisheries, is sought after as a gamefish, and is sometimes kept in aquariums.

== Etymology ==
The fish is named in honor of John Melmoth Dow (1827–1892) of the Panama Railroad Company. As a ship captain and amateur naturalist, he collected the type specimen.

== As pets ==
Parachromis dovii is sometimes sought after by well experienced aquarists. While they are noted for their relatively high intelligence and lifespan of up to a few decades, they require special care due to their large size and high levels of aggression even by cichlid standards, meaning that few — if any — tank mates are possible.

== Conservation ==
Parachromis dovii is widespread in its native range and generally common. Although it has declined locally due to overfishing and pollution, it is not considered threatened. It occurs in Costa Rica's Maquenque National Wildlife Refuge. The species has been introduced to some locations in Central America where it is not native.
