= San Carlos River (Costa Rica) =

River in the Alajuela Province of Costa Rica

Coordinates: 10°47′03″N 84°11′49″W

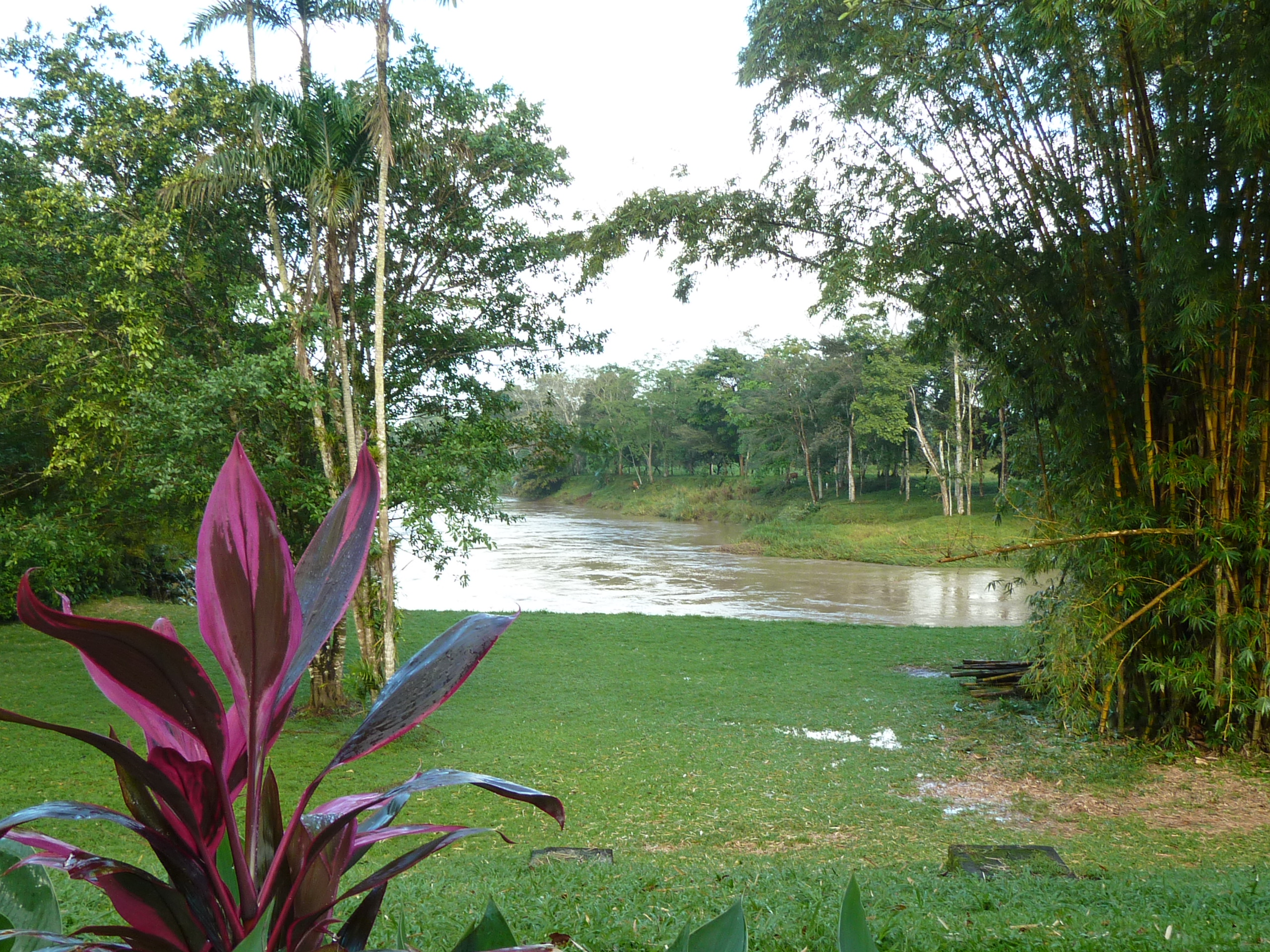
San Carlos River, near Muelle

The San Carlos River (Spanish: Rio San Carlos) is a river in the Alajuela Province of Costa Rica that drains into the San Juan River and thus into the Caribbean Sea. Its basin covers an area of about 3,100 km2. The river has a length of 142 km of which about 60 km allow navigation. The river originates from the confluence of the Jabillos River and Peje River both originating on the eastern side of the Cordillera de Tilarán and traverses the San Carlos Canton. It meets the San Juan River close to Boca San Carlos.

Tributaries include:

- Platanar River, (Rio Platanar)
- Arenal River, (Rio Arenal)
- Penas Blancas River, (Rio Penas Blancas)
- Tres Amigos River, (Rio Tres Amigos)

The basin has both economic and touristic importance. Rice, corn, beans, cane sugar, and pineapple are grown within it, also live stock produces milk and meat. In addition, there are touristic attractions, some are in the area of the Arenal Volcano: hiking, river tours, hot springs, and ecotourism. The average rainfall in the basin ranges from 3.500 to 4,500 mm and the temperature between 22 and 28 degrees C.

A number of wildlife refugee areas are part of the basin, including the Tenorio Volcano National Park, Juan Castro Blanco National Park, Alberto Manuel Brenes Biological Reserve and the Maquenque National Park. Development with deforestation and hunting are a threat to the natural habitat of the basin.
