= Arenal River =

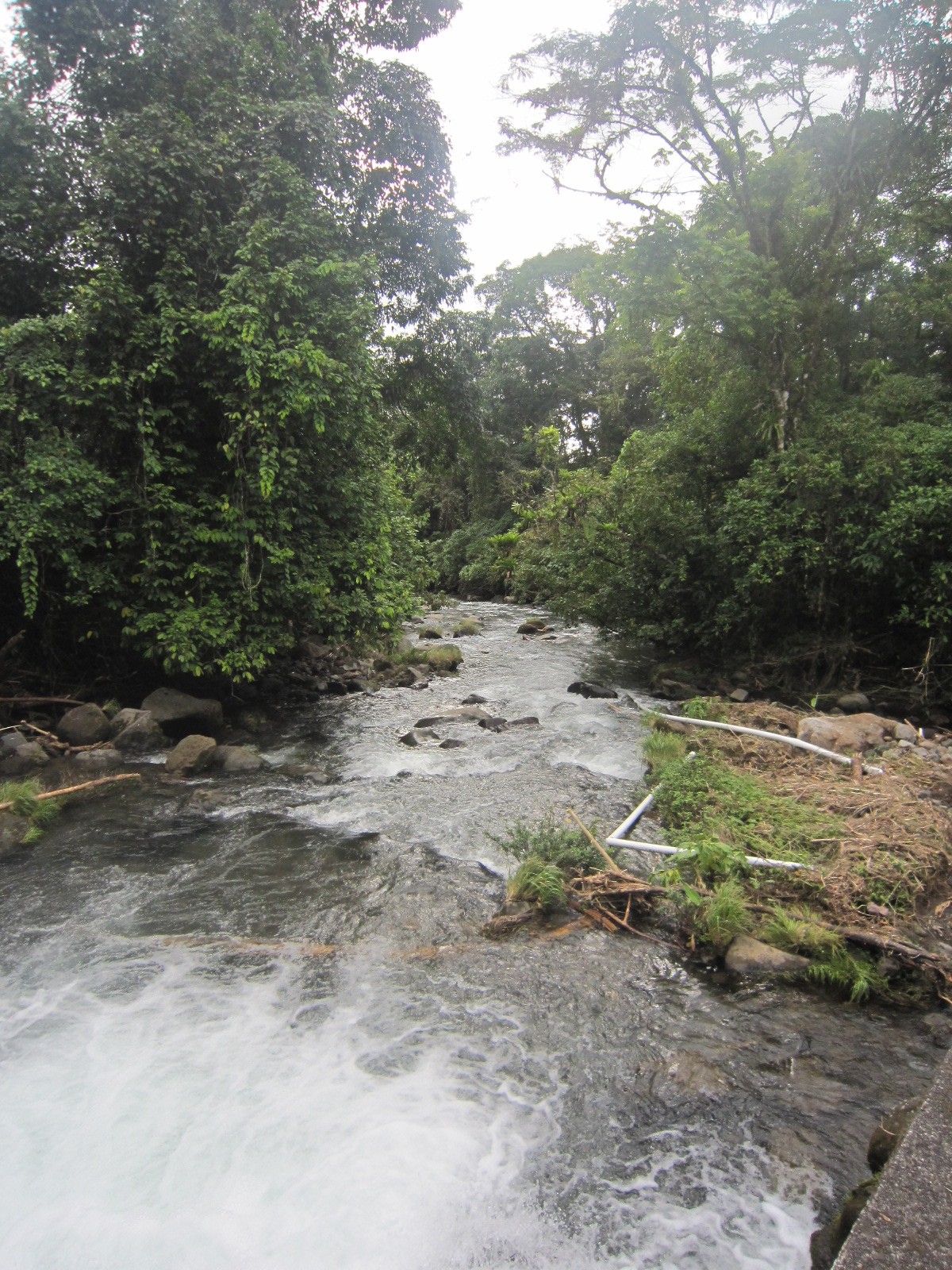
- Picture of the Arenal River

Location
- Country: Costa Rica

Arenal River is a river of Costa Rica that is a tributary of the San Carlos River. Its upper part is dammed by the Presa Sangregado Dam to form the Lake Arenal.
