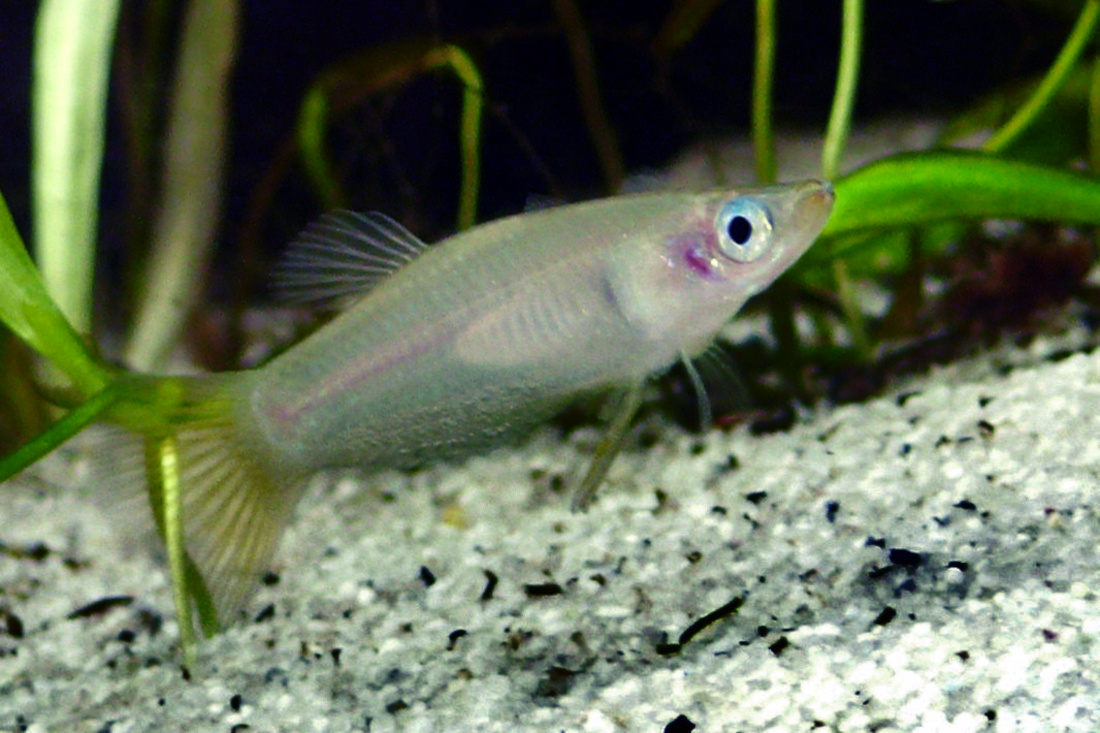
- A. cultratus

Scientific classification
- Kingdom: Animalia
- Phylum: Chordata
- Class: Actinopterygii
- Order: Cyprinodontiformes
- Family: Poeciliidae
- Subfamily: Poeciliinae
- Tribe: Alfarini; Hubbs, 1924
- Genus: Alfaro; Meek, 1912

Type species
- Alfaro acutiventralis Meek, 1912

= Alfaro (fish) =

Genus of fishes

Alfaro is a genus of poeciliid fishes endemic to Central America. The generic name honours the Costa Rican archaeologist, geologist, ethnologist, zoologist and Director of the National Museum of Costa Rica, Anastasio Alfaro (1865-1951).

== Species ==
There are currently two recognized species in this genus:

- Alfaro cultratus (Regan, 1908)
- Alfaro huberi (Fowler, 1923)
