= Mouriri completens =

Conservation status
- Endangered (IUCN 2.3)

Scientific classification
- Kingdom: Plantae
- Clade: Tracheophytes
- Clade: Angiosperms
- Clade: Eudicots
- Clade: Rosids
- Order: Myrtales
- Family: Melastomataceae
- Genus: Mouriri
- Species: M. completens

Binomial name
- Mouriri completens (Pitt.) Burret

Species of flowering plant

Mouriri completens is a species of plant in the family Melastomataceae. It is found in Colombia and Panama.
