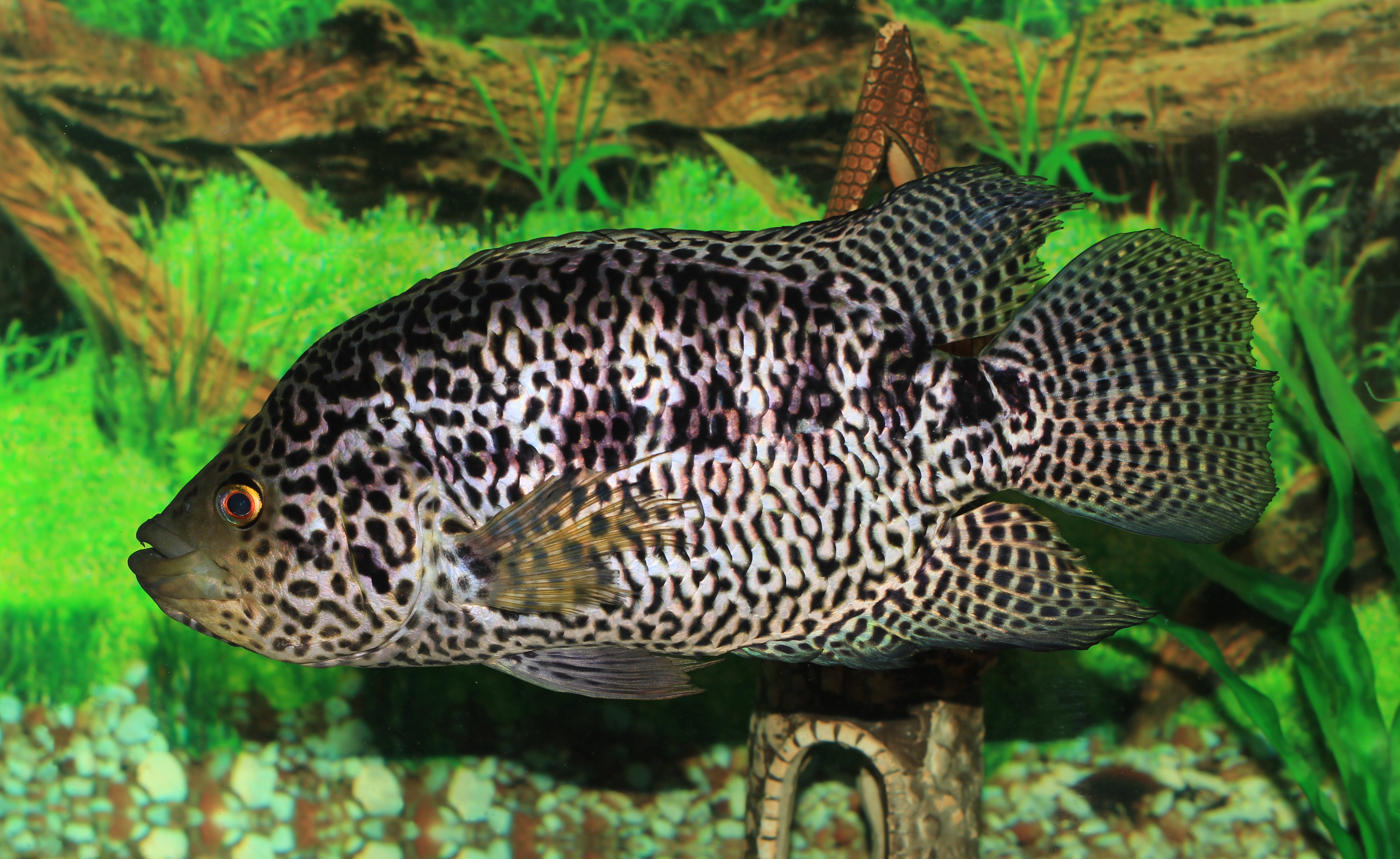
- Jaguar Guapote (P. managuense)

Scientific classification
- Kingdom: Animalia
- Phylum: Chordata
- Class: Actinopterygii
- Order: Cichliformes
- Family: Cichlidae
- Tribe: Heroini
- Genus: Parachromis; Agassiz, 1859

Type species
- Parachromis gulosus Agassiz, 1859

= Parachromis =

Genus of fishes

Parachromis is a genus of cichlids native to Central America. Some species occur in Lake Nicaragua and Lake Managua. All species are predatory and relatively large for cichlids.

== Species ==
There are currently five recognized species in this genus:

- Parachromis dovii (Günther, 1864) (Wolf cichlid, Guapote)
- Parachromis friedrichsthalii (Heckel, 1840) (Yellowjacket cichlid)
- Parachromis loisellei (W. A. Bussing, 1989)
- Parachromis managuensis (Günther, 1867) (Jaguar cichlid, Jaguar guapote)
- Parachromis motaguensis (Günther, 1867) (False yellowjacket cichlid)

Confusingly, a review in 2018 of the type specimen of P. friedrichsthalii showed that this actually is the species that commonly has been referred to as P. loisellei. As a result, P. loisellei becomes a junior synonym of P. friedrichsthalii, while the yellowjacket cichlid that formerly was incorrectly referred to as P. friedrichsthalii should be referred to as P. multifasciatus.
