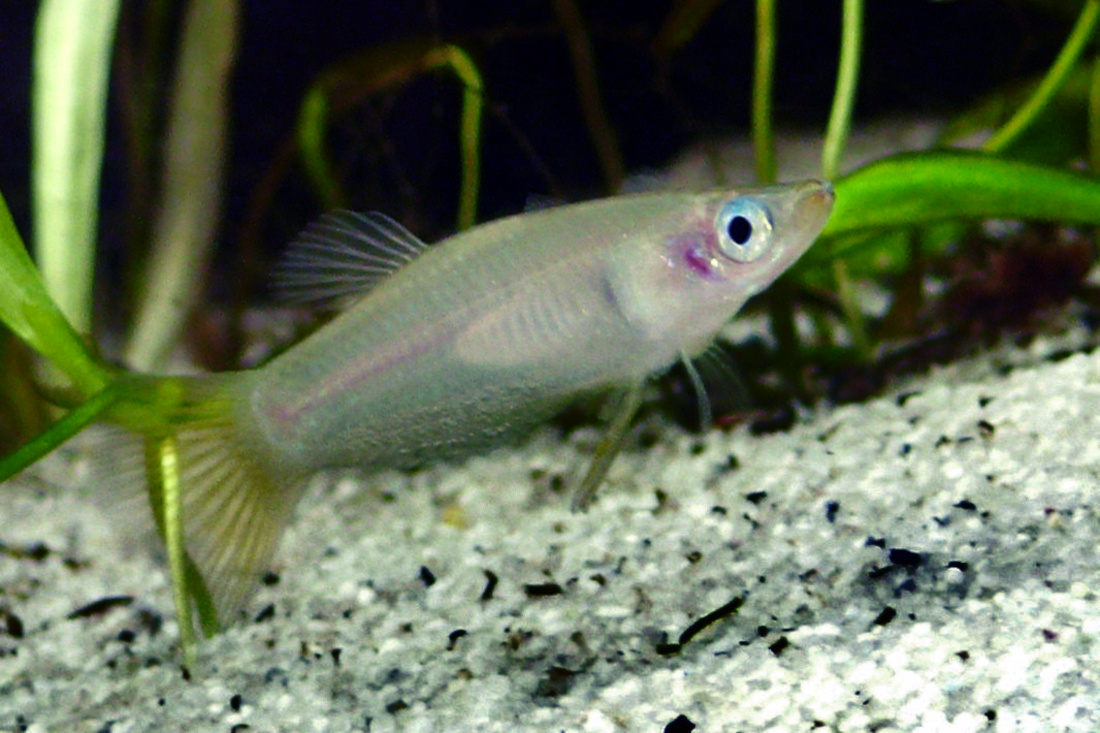

Conservation status
- Least Concern (IUCN 3.1)

Scientific classification
- Kingdom: Animalia
- Phylum: Chordata
- Class: Actinopterygii
- Order: Cyprinodontiformes
- Family: Poeciliidae
- Genus: Alfaro
- Species: A. cultratus

Binomial name
- Alfaro cultratus (Regan, 1908)

Synonyms
- Petalosoma cultratum Regan, 1908; Petalurichthys cultratus (Regan, 1908); Petalosoma amazonum Regan, 1911; Alfaro amazonum (Regan, 1911); Petalurichthys amazonum (Regan, 1911); Alfaro acutiventralis Meek, 1912

= Alfaro cultratus =

Species of fish

Alfaro cultratus, the knife livebearer, is a species of tropical freshwater fish from the family Poeciliidae. It hails from Central America and is often kept in home aquaria.

== Names ==
The scientific name of the species comes from the Costa Rican zoologist Anastasio Alfaro. The vernacular name for Alfaro cultratus, knife livebearer, comes from the two knife-shaped rows of scales near the tail on the lower end of the fish. It is known as olomina in Costa Rica, as are many similar fish.

== Description ==
It has two knife-shaped rows of scales on the lower edge of its caudal peduncle. Its body is overall olive-gray, paler on the belly, while the flanks have blueish or green hues. The fins are transparent, but the caudal fin develops a dark edging as the fish ages. Maximum recorded length of the knife livebearer is 7.5 cm (3.0 in) for males and 8.0 cm (3.1 in) for females.

== Distribution and habitat ==
The knife livebearer is native to the Central American countries of Costa Rica, Panama and Nicaragua. It is usually found in small groups in slow to moderately fast flowing creeks and ditches and in the shorelines of large rivers, but it is a powerful swimmer and has also been recorded inhabiting a fast flowing stream in a rainforest.

It is the most common poeciliid in the rivers of the Maquenque National Wildlife Refuge in Costa Rica.

== Ecology ==
Alfaro cultratus is insectivorous, taking aquatic insects as juveniles and moving onto terrestrial insects in adulthood.

Like most American poeciliids, the knife livebearers reproduce ovoviviparously. After a gestation period of 24 days, the female gives birth to 10 to 30 young, seldom more. For a livebearer, the gestation period is relatively short and the brood size small. The fry reach sexual maturity within six months.

== Fishkeeping ==
Alfaro cultratus is one of numerous livebearers popular in the fishkeeping hobby. It requires a temperature of 24 to 28 °C (75 to 82 °F). The fish is intolerant of stagnant water, being susceptible to bacterial infections, making it necessary to change about 30% of the aquarium water twice a month. Aquatic plants help reduce its natural skittishness.

The knife livebearers are best kept in a single species aquarium. The adults should be fed small live food such as daphnia, but will also take flake food. The fry can be fed brine shrimp nauplii.
