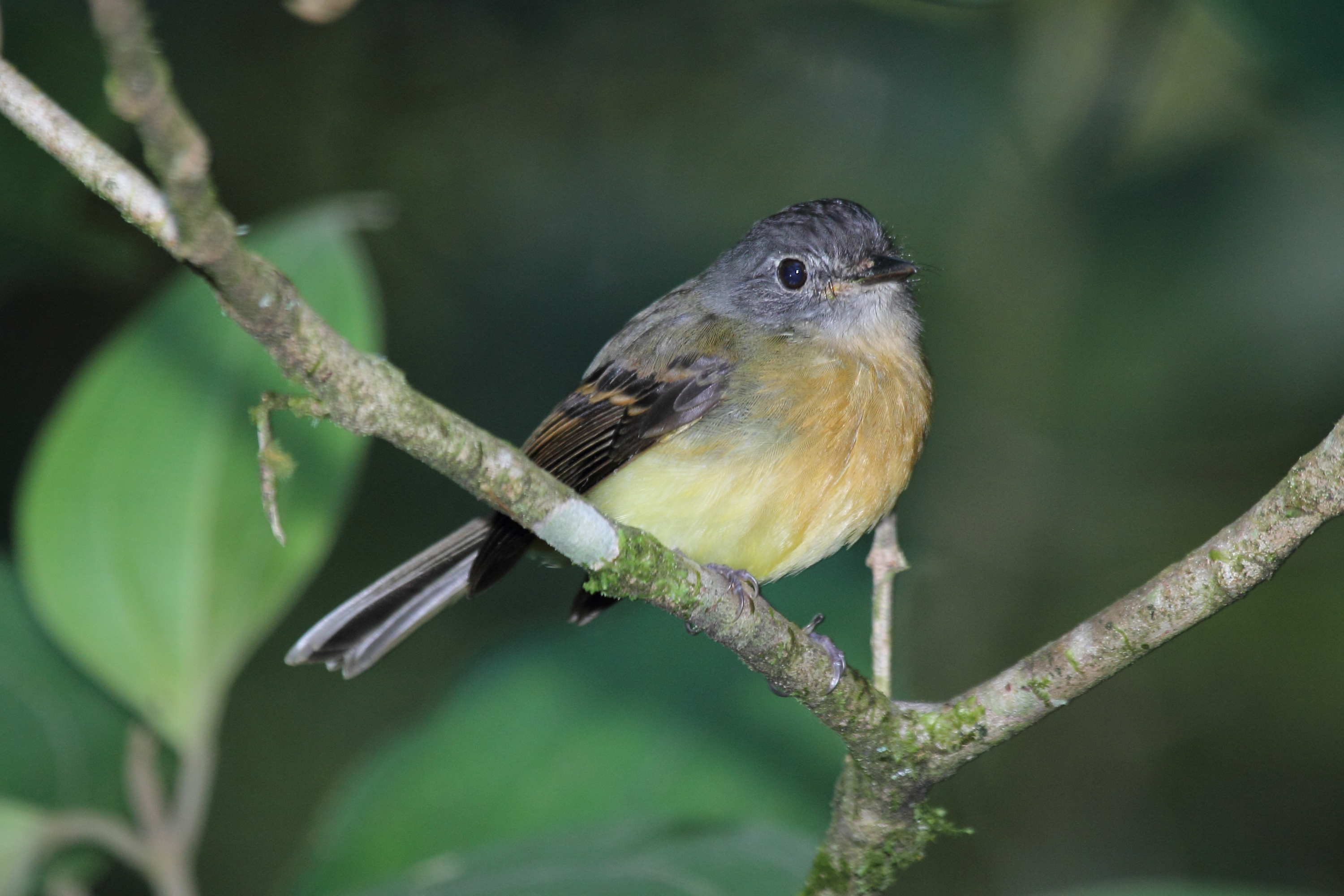
- Tawny-chested flycatcher (Aphanotriccus capitalis)

Scientific classification
- Kingdom: Animalia
- Phylum: Chordata
- Class: Aves
- Order: Passeriformes
- Family: Tyrannidae
- Genus: Aphanotriccus; Ridgway, 1905

Type species
- Myiobius capitalis Salvin, 1865

Species
- A. capitalis A. audax

= Aphanotriccus =

Genus of birds

Aphanotriccus is a small genus of passerine birds in the tyrant flycatcher family. They breed in the Caribbean lowlands and foothills of Central America.

== Species ==
There are just two species:

Image	Common name	Scientific name	Distribution
	Tawny-chested flycatcher or Salvin's flycatcher	Aphanotriccus capitalis	eastern Nicaragua to northeastern Costa Rica, although all Nicaraguan records are historical specimens collected near Lake Nicaragua or its outflow.
	Black-billed flycatcher, or Nelson's flycatcher	Aphanotriccus audax	eastern Panama and northwestern Colombia.

These are uncommon inhabitants of mature evergreen forest and tall secondary growth, usually in dense understory vegetation on the woodland edges, along streams or in clearings.

These flycatchers are seen alone or in pairs seeking insects, especially beetles and ants, picked from the underside of foliage in flight.

Logging, conversion to banana plantations and cattle-ranch expansion have resulted in widespread forest clearance and severe fragmentation, particularly in Costa Rica and Panama. These species' small range and intolerance of forest fragmentation suggest that they are declining, although more research is needed.
