= Mouriri panamensis =

Conservation status
- Vulnerable (IUCN 2.3)

Scientific classification
- Kingdom: Plantae
- Clade: Tracheophytes
- Clade: Angiosperms
- Clade: Eudicots
- Clade: Rosids
- Order: Myrtales
- Family: Melastomataceae
- Genus: Mouriri
- Species: M. panamensis

Binomial name
- Mouriri panamensis Morley

Species of flowering plant

Mouriri panamensis is a species of plant in the family Melastomataceae. It is found in Colombia and Panama. It is threatened by habitat loss.
