= Bolitoglossa indio =

Conservation status
- Endangered (IUCN 3.1)

Scientific classification
- Kingdom: Animalia
- Phylum: Chordata
- Class: Amphibia
- Order: Urodela
- Family: Plethodontidae
- Genus: Bolitoglossa
- Species: B. indio

Binomial name
- Bolitoglossa indio Sunyer, Lotzkat, Hertz, Wake, Aléman, Robleto, and Köhler, 2008

Species of salamander

Bolitoglossa indio is a species of salamander in the family Plethodontidae. It is a rather small salamander for its genus, with females growing to a snout–vent length of 46.8 mm (1.84 in). It is generally brown in color, with a grayish-brown underside and reddish-brown underside of the head. It found in Nicaragua and Costa Rica, where it inhabits leaf litter in pristine lowland rainforest. It is classified as being endangered by the IUCN and is threatened by habitat degradation.

== Taxonomy ==
A specimen belonging to Bolitoglossa indio had been collected from Costa Rica as far back as 1890 by C. F. Underwood, but was successively misidentified as Spelerpes variegatus, Oedipus platydactylus, and Bolitoglossa alvaradoi, only being correctly identified as B. indio in 2012. Bolitoglossa indio was formally described in 2008 based on an adult female specimen collected from near Dos Bocas de Río Indio, in the Department of Río San Juan in northeastern Nicaragua, in 2006. The species is named after the place where it was discovered. The species has the English common names Rio Indio mushroomtongue salamander and Indian's river salamander. In Spanish, it is known as the Salamandra del Río Indio.

It is placed within the subgenus Bolitoglossa. A 2025 review of Costa Rican amphibians postulated that B. indio was synonymous with B. alvaradoi due to the similar appearance of the two species.

== Description ==
Bolitoglossa indio is a rather small salamander for its genus, with females growing to a snout–vent length of 46.8 mm (1.84 in). The back, head, and tail are brown with many dark brown flecks on the head. The underside is pale grayish-brown, paler on the chest. The underside of the head is reddish-brown. The limbs are dark brown above and grayish-brown below. The latter half of the tail is darker brown than the rest of the dorsum.

== Distribution and habitat ==
Bolitoglossa indio is found in Nicaragua and Costa Rica, where it is found only in the department of Río San Juan and the province of Alajuela. In Nicaragua, it has been documented from leaf litter in pristine lowland rainforest.

== Conservation ==
Bolitoglossa indio is classified as being endangered by the IUCN. In the Red Book of Amphibians and Reptiles of Nicaragua, it is classified as being critically endangered. It has a small range which is facing ongoing habitat degradation. The Indio Maíz Biological Reserve, where the species lives, was hit by Hurricane Otto is 2016, damaging much of the old-growth rainforest there. Climatic changes driven by climate change may negatively impact the species. Pathogens such as salamander chytrid fungus, ranavirus, and myiasis are also possible threats to the species.
