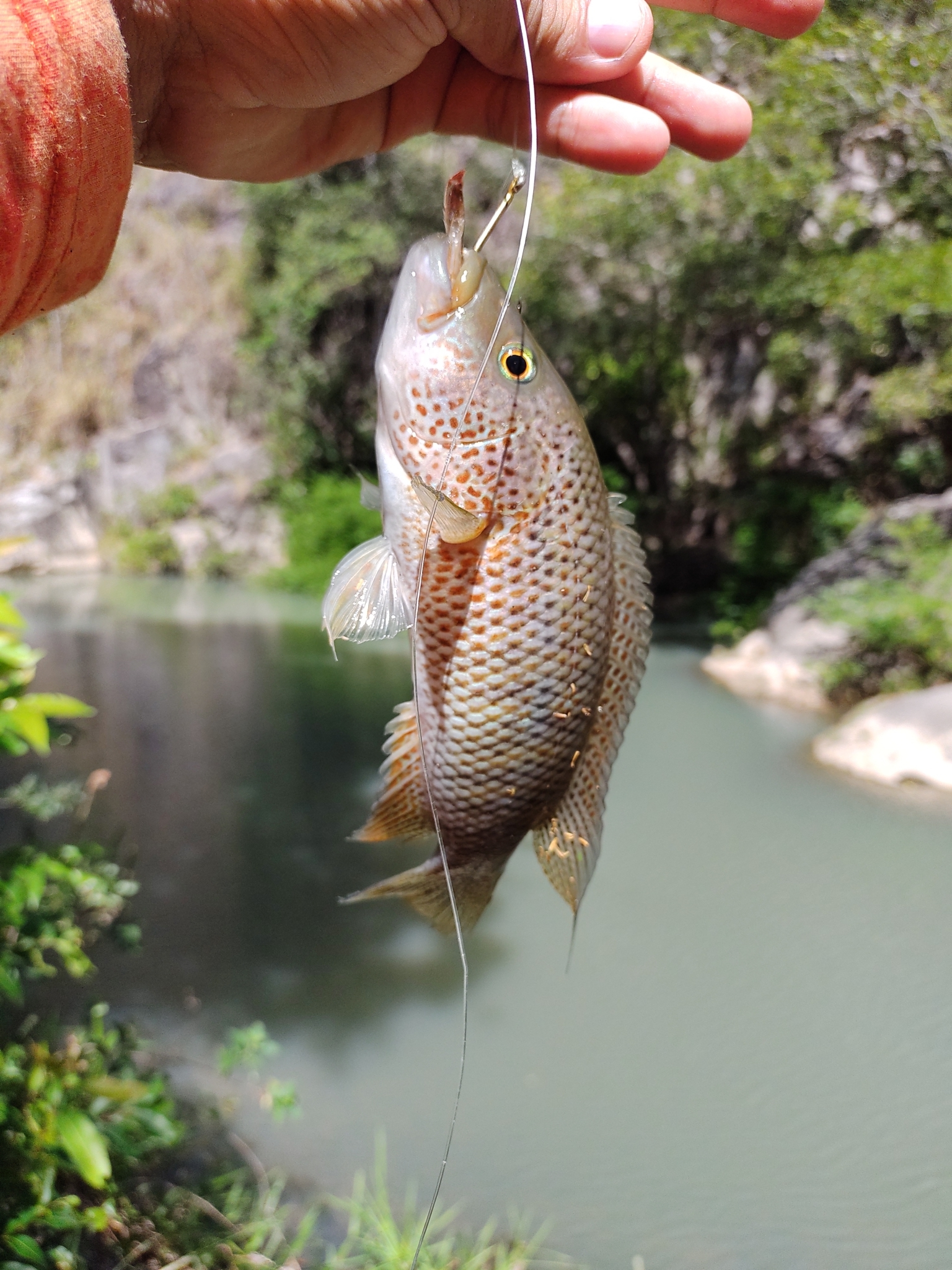

Conservation status
- Least Concern (IUCN 3.1)

Scientific classification
- Kingdom: Animalia
- Phylum: Chordata
- Class: Actinopterygii
- Order: Cichliformes
- Family: Cichlidae
- Genus: Parachromis
- Species: P. motaguensis

Binomial name
- Parachromis motaguensis (Günther, 1867)

Synonyms
- Heros motaguensis Günther, 1867; Cichlasoma motaguense (Günther, 1867); Herichthys motaguense (Günther, 1867)

= Parachromis motaguensis =

Species of cichlid fish

Parachromis motaguensis, the false yellowjacket cichlid, is a species of cichlid native to Central America, where it can be found in Guatemala, El Salvador, and Honduras. This species grows to a length of 30 centimetres (12 in) TL. This species is farmed.

== Aquarium care ==
Unlike its close relative Parachromis managuensis, P. motaguensis isn't as commonly encountered in the aquarium trade. Although their visual appearance is very similar, the motaguensis (traded by many names, including Red tiger, Red dragon cichlid) displays an array of bright red dots, (hence the variants of the common name), which run along the flanks to the base of the caudal fin. An impressive array of this colouration is made distinct on the gills of this fish where such colour is highly pronounced.

The female of this species is even more brilliantly coloured, with a deep shades of red and oranges much more prominent than the males colour. This colour is enhanced further during the breeding period.

=== Breeding ===
Breeding can be achieved with very little effort and no specific requirements are needed for breeding purposes. As long as water conditions are maintained at a desirable high quality, a breeding pair of such fish will readily spawn. To enhance the likelihood of acquiring a breeding pair, purchase several healthy and active juveniles at a young age (between 6 -10) and grow these specimens until sexual maturity. Generally, you should be left with a breeding pair or two. These fish will noticeably become more aggressive and territorial, Remove all other fish at this point and keep the newly formed breeding pair separate. When a breeding pair had been successfully established, the male will begin to court the female by displaying his erect finnage to the female as he tries to impress her in an attempt for her to accept his mating invitation. The pair will begin to clean a flat surface if the female is responsive of the male's previous courting behavior. The female will then lay approximately 1000 - 2000 orange coloured eggs which will then be fertilized by the male. The eggs will be ferociously guarded by both parents and a high degree of parental care is show to the eggs and fry. When the eggs hatch after approximately 5 –7 days, the offspring (known as wrigglers at this stage in development) are defenseless and are unable to swim. They are often transported to pre dug pits by both parents, and are guarded. The fry will begin to swim in approximately 7 days and should be fed with baby brine shrimp or alike. If you would like to rear these fry, they should be removed at this point as they will later be consumed by both parents as the female becomes due to spawn once more. Feed the fry baby brine shrimp until the stage where they are large enough to consume blood worm, daphnia and other live foods. When purchasing fish in an attempt to acquire a breeding pair, try to buy fish from different sources. There is a high probability that when buying fish from the same source, Fish will be from the same parents (Siblings). This should be avoided, as breeding fish in this manner may form offspring with genetic disease usually associated with interbreeding. Also, buy fish of a similar size, the chances of acquiring a breeding pair with fish of a similar size is significant to that of attempting to breed fish of different age and size.

=== Aquarium ===
The aquarium should be large (more than 400 litres (110 US gal)) for a breeding pair of red tiger cichlids. As with all members of its genus, These fish are large and heavily built cichlids who are aggressive and highly territorial. Decor should be kept to a minimum in such an aquarium and a sand or fine gravel should be used as the main substrate. Many pieces of flat slate or rock should also be included for the female to lay her eggs upon.

=== Diet ===
The genus Parachromis are not fussy eaters and will readily accept most food substances offered. Diet should be varied however. Offer a variety of insect, including blood worm, earthworm, mysis, crickets (for larger specimens). Chopped meat can also be offered along with beef heart (offer very sparingly due to its high fat content) along with prawn and fish (live/frozen). Frozen fish is a much preferred method of feeding fish as many "feeder fish" carry the risk of the introducing disease into an aquarium.

=== Sexing ===
Females are smaller than the male and the red pigment seems more prominent in the gill plates. The red colouration is significantly prominent in the female in breeding colours. The male's dorsal and ventral fins are also much more extended and elongated than the female's.

=== Water chemistry ===
pH of 7.0 - 8.0 preferably. Temperature of 27 °C (81 °F).
