= Trimetopon barbouri =

Conservation status
- Data Deficient (IUCN 3.1)

Scientific classification
- Kingdom: Animalia
- Phylum: Chordata
- Class: Reptilia
- Order: Squamata
- Suborder: Serpentes
- Family: Colubridae
- Genus: Trimetopon
- Species: T. barbouri

Binomial name
- Trimetopon barbouri Dunn, 1930

Species of snake

Barbour's tropical ground snake (Trimetopon barbouri), also known commonly as Barbour's pygmy snake, is a species of snake in the family Colubridae. The species is endemic to Panama.

== Etymology ==
The specific name, barbouri, is in honor of American herpetologist Thomas Barbour.

== Geographic range ==
T. barbouri is endemic to the western region of Panama, and occasionally is found on Barro Colorado Island.

== Habitat ==
The preferred natural habitat of T. barbouri is forest, at altitudes of 20–800 m (66–2,625 ft).

== Description ==
T. barbouri has two normal prefrontals, unlike other species of its genus which have the prefrontals fused. The holotype, a male, measures 26 cm (10 in) in total length, which includes a tail 6.5 cm (2.6 in) long.

== Reproduction ==
T. barbouri is oviparous.
