= Craugastor andi =

Conservation status
- Critically Endangered (IUCN 3.1)

Scientific classification
- Kingdom: Animalia
- Phylum: Chordata
- Class: Amphibia
- Order: Anura
- Family: Craugastoridae
- Genus: Craugastor
- Species: C. andi

Binomial name
- Craugastor andi (Savage, 1974)

Synonyms
- Eleutherodactylus andi Savage, 1974

Species of amphibian

Craugastor andi is a species of rain frog in the family Craugastoridae which has not been seen since 1990. It is found in the Caribbean drainage of Costa Rica in the mountains and hills of the Cordillera Central and the far northeastern Cordillera de Talamanca, and in extreme northwestern Panama. Frank and Ramus (1995) give it the vernacular name Atlantic robber frog. It is known locally in Spanish by the generic names, used for many species, of rana de hojarasca, ranita or sapito.

== Taxonomy ==
This species was first described in 1974 by Jay M. Savage as Eleutherodactylus andi, who split it from the no longer recognised waste-basket taxon E. palmatus. The holotype was collected at 1,150 m (3,770 ft), some 0.8 km (0.50 mi) north from the juncture of the Claro River and the Hondura River, in Vázquez de Coronado canton, San Jose Province, Costa Rica. Stephen Blair Hedges classified it in the subgenus Craugastor in 1989. A phylogenetic analysis using DNA by Crawford and Smith, published 2005, indicated it should be moved into a new genus. It was formally moved to genus Craugastor by Frost et al.. in 2006. Hedges, Duellman and Heinicke classified it in subgenus Craugastor of the genus Craugastor in 2008.

It was formerly classified in the family Leptodactylidae, but as of 2014 is placed in the family Craugastoridae.

Lynch and Duellman classified it in the species group of E. fitzingeri in 1997. In 2000 Lynch removed it from said group. Savage places it in a E. fitzingeri series in the E. fitzingeri group in 2002. Hedges, Duellman and Heinicke then place it in the Craugastor fitzingeri series of the species group of C. melanostictus in 2008, which was followed by Padial, Grant, and Frost in 2014.

=== Etymology ===
When he first described it Savage dedicated this species to Dr. Andrew Starrett, his "good friend and Costa Rican field companion"; the specific name andi has no actual meaning in Latin, Savage states the word is just "an arbitrary combination of letters".

== Description ==
Female Craugastor andi are relatively large and can grow to 80 mm (3.1 in) in snout–vent length, whereas males are smaller, up to 55 mm (2.2 in) SVL. The head is rather narrow, with a long, pointed snout. It is 30 to 43% as wide as long. The limbs are only slightly webbed, there is a minute membrane between the third and fourth fingers, which extends at most only a little beyond the first subarticular tubercle of each digit, whereas the feet have a thin web between all five of the digits; it extends to the subarticular tubercle between the first to third digits, from the third to fifth it extends slightly beyond this tubercle. The third and fourth fingers are tipped with enlarged ball or disc-like pads, the other digits have much smaller discs, the feet smaller than the hands. The discs of the hands are equal to or wider than the tubercles. The skin of the back can be either smooth with some warts, but is never tuberculate. Adult males have nuptial pads and vocal slits.

The dorsum (back) is dark brown, sometimes with a thin, light mid-dorsal stripe running down the centre of its back. The ventral surface has a white background colouration, sometimes tinged yellow or reddish on the undersides of the thighs and towards the end of the creature, and is covered with dark splotches. The groin and the back of the thighs are coloured chocolate brown with bright yellow dots or broad stripes on living specimens. The throat is dark brown or solid black, a lighter-coloured stripe runs down it. The iris is coloured coppery gold and is split through the middle with a horizontal dark brown line. Living specimens are more colourful than dead animals, the ventral surface is then described as bright yellow, usually tinged with salmon-pink.

It has a karyotype of 2n=22.

== Distribution ==
As of 2002 it has been collected from the Costa Rican mountain ranges (cordilleras) of the Guanacaste, Tilarán, Volcánica Central and the north of the Talamanca. It was seen in Panama some time before 2010 along the Río Claro in Bocas del Toro Province.

== Ecology ==
=== Habitat ===
The native habitat of Craugastor andi is tropical, wet premontane rainforest with bromeliads, usually close to streams, at elevations of 560 m (1,840 ft) to 1,500 m (4,900 ft) above sea level. Savage (2002) states that it has mostly been collected at an altitude of 1,000–1,200 m (3,300–3,900 ft). In Panama it has been collected at 910 m (2,990 ft).

=== Behaviour ===
It is a nocturnal, probably arboreal species. The frog is usually found near streams and has also been found up to 5m high in the water pools in the centres of many bromeliads growing as epiphytes on trees. Males call from along streams; females descend from trees to mate. Savage describes the call as "a deep glug, repeated several times". Breeding takes place during the first heavy rains of the wet season. Gravid females have been found in bromeliads. The eggs are laid on dry land. This species possesses "direct development", the eggs develop directly into tiny juvenile frogs, skipping a tadpole stage.

=== Diseases ===
This frog is suspected to be susceptible to the deadly pathogenic fungus Batrachochytrium dendrobatidis.

== Conservation ==
It was formerly believed to be endemic to Costa Rica. It was assessed for the IUCN as being "critically endangered" in 2004, and in 2008 it retained this status, due to its "drastic population decline". It is considered threatened in Costa Rica, and is protected by the wildlife conservation law No. 7317, environmental law No. 7554 and the decree No. 26435-MINAE.

The frog was regularly seen in the annual collections of amphibians at least in two of the various nature parks of Costa Rica it was known from, but in the late 1980s this species suddenly declined and disappeared from the amphibian collections. The last record of this species was from 1990, and it has not been seen since (as of August 2007), despite it having been searched for. It has not been seen in Cascajal, San Jose Province, since 1972. Because it has seemingly disappeared from the areas in which it has almost only been collected - otherwise pristine, well-managed nature reserves, infection by the introduced fungal disease chytridiomycosis has been suggested as the reason of decline, as this has also impacted other similar frogs from similar habitats. The IUCN also mentions unspecified possible impacts from climate change.

It is, or was, found in the Monteverde Cloud Forest Reserve, the Alberto Manuel Brenes Biological Reserve and the Maquenque National Wildlife Refuge in Costa Rica from 560–1,400 m (1,840–4,590 ft) in altitude. There is no ex situ population of this species under conservation.
