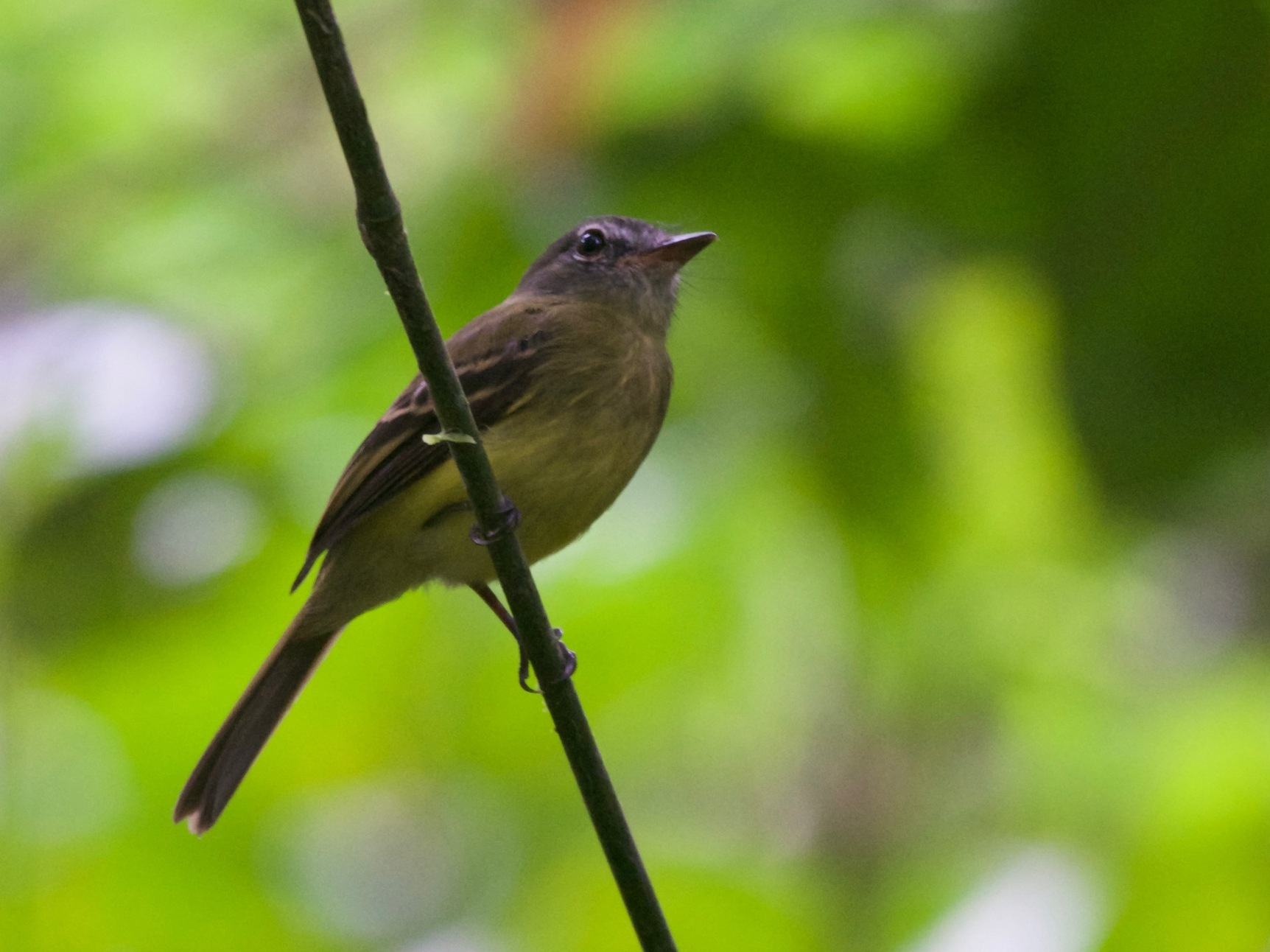

Conservation status
- Near Threatened (IUCN 3.1)

Scientific classification
- Kingdom: Animalia
- Phylum: Chordata
- Class: Aves
- Order: Passeriformes
- Family: Tyrannidae
- Genus: Aphanotriccus
- Species: A. audax

Binomial name
- Aphanotriccus audax (Nelson, 1912)

Synonyms
- Praedo audax

= Black-billed flycatcher =

Species of bird

The black-billed flycatcher (Aphanotriccus audax) is a Near Threatened species of bird in the family Tyrannidae, the tyrant flycatchers. It is found in Colombia and Panama.

== Taxonomy and systematics ==
The black-billed flycatcher was originally described by American naturalist Edward William Nelson in 1912 as Praedo audax. Beginning in about 1935 some authors merged Praedo into Aphanotriccus but as late as 1972 at least one retained the species in Praedo.

The black-billed flycatcher is monotypic. It shares genus Aphanotriccus with the tawny-chested flycatcher (A. capitalis).

== Description ==
The black-billed flycatcher is about 13 cm (5.1 in) long. The sexes are thought to have the same plumage. Adult males have an olive-gray crown, a thin white eye-ring, and a white stripe above the lores. Their upperparts are bright greenish olive. Their wings are dusky with pale buff ends on the coverts that show as two wing bars. Their tail is rather long and dusky brown. Their throat is white, their upper breast white with a faint olive wash, and their lower breast and belly are yellowish to greenish. They have a dark iris, a short black bill, and blackish legs and feet.

== Distribution and habitat ==
The black-billed flycatcher is found from eastern Panamá and Darién provinces in eastern Panama east into northern Colombia as far as the middle reaches of the Magdalena River valley in Santander Department and the Santa Marta Mountains. It is not found continuously within these areas. It inhabits humid primary forest and mature secondary forest in the tropical zone, where it primarily is found in low dense vegetation near streams and swamps. It often associates with stands of bamboo. In elevation it is found from sea level to 600 m (2,000 ft).

== Behavior ==
=== Movement ===
The black-billed flycatcher is a year-round resident.

=== Feeding ===
The black-billed flycatcher feeds on insects. It typically forages in pairs and rarely joins mixed-species feeding flocks. It perches somewhat horizontally, typically up to about 4 m (13 ft) above the ground. It captures prey in mid-air with sallies from the perch ("hawking") or snatches it from foliage after a short flight.

=== Breeding ===
The black-billed flycatcher's breeding season appears to span at least March to June. Nothing else is known about the species' breeding biology.

=== Vocalization ===
The black-billed flycatcher is not highly vocal. Its song is "a loud, sharply enunciated but wheezy or burry bee béé, be-be-be-bez, jee-jee-jew or fainter bee-beez-bez-baw".

== Status ==
The IUCN has assessed the black-billed flycatcher as Near Threatened. Though its range encompasses 222,000 km^{2} (86,000 sq mi) it is estimated to occupy only about 34,000 km^{2} (13,000 sq mi) within it. Its population size is not known and is believed to be decreasing. "Due to its preference for mature forests, the species is threatened by habitat destruction through conversion of forests following road-building. Much of the original forests within the range has already been lost to deforestation, with the main drivers being agriculture and livestock grazing, palm oil plantations and gold mining." It is considered uncommon in Panama and locally common in Colombia. It is found in Darién National Park in Panama.
