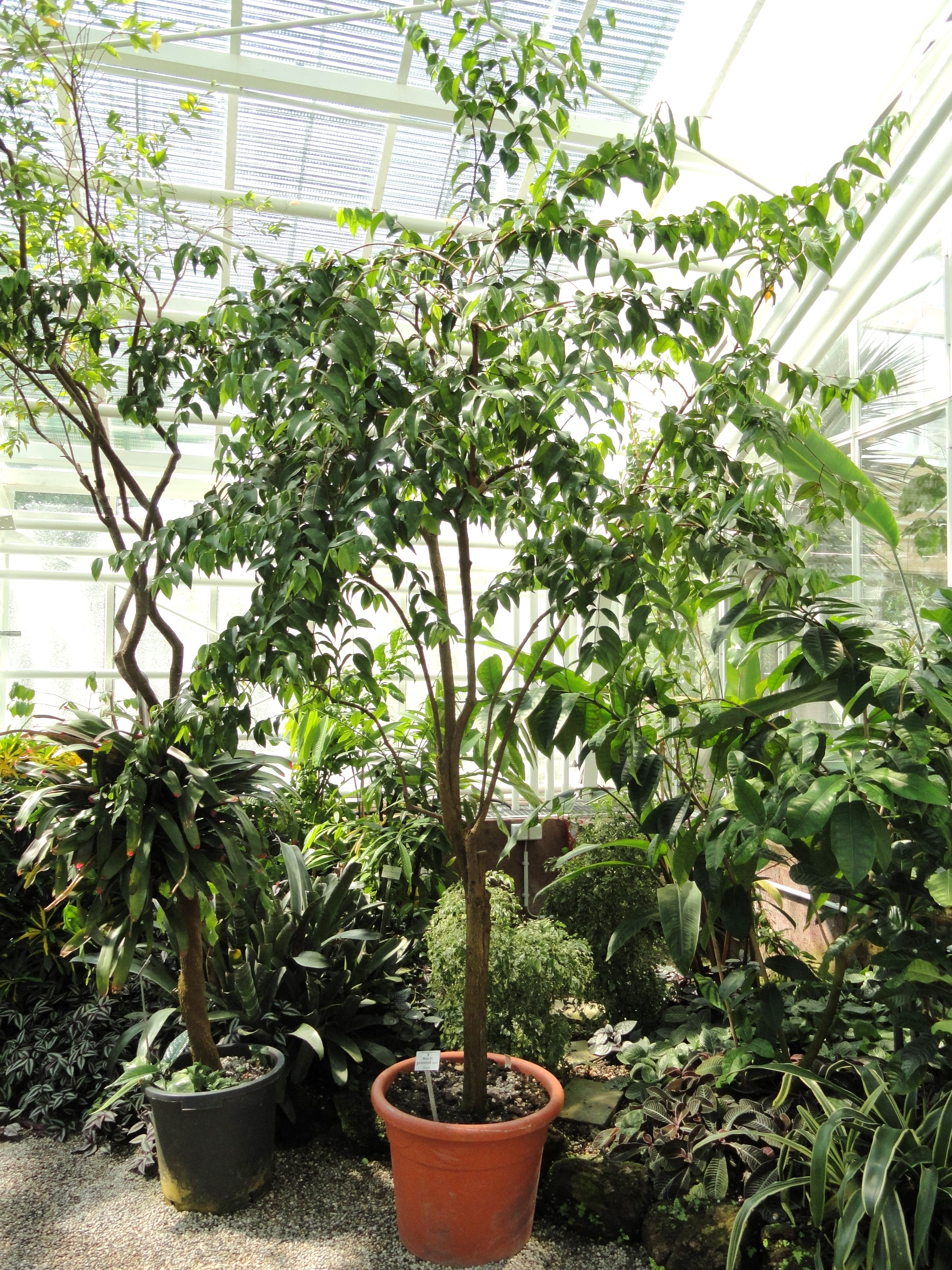

Conservation status
- Least Concern (IUCN 3.1)

Scientific classification
- Kingdom: Plantae
- Clade: Tracheophytes
- Clade: Angiosperms
- Clade: Eudicots
- Clade: Rosids
- Order: Myrtales
- Family: Melastomataceae
- Genus: Mouriri
- Species: M. guianensis

Binomial name
- Mouriri guianensis Aublet

= Mouriri guianensis =

Species of plant

Mouriri guianensis is a plant species in the Melastomataceae family, native to South America.

== Description ==
Mouriri guianensis is an evergreen fruit-bearing tree that can grow up to 4–9 metres (13–30 ft) tall. The bright orange berries are round and around 3 centimetres (1 in) in size.

== Distribution and habitat ==
Mouriri guianensis naturally grows in countries such as Brazil, Bolivia, Peru, Ecuador, Venezuela, Guyana, and French Guiana. They tend to be found in rainforests and savannahs.
