= Alfaro huberi =

Conservation status
- Least Concern (IUCN 3.1)

Scientific classification
- Kingdom: Animalia
- Phylum: Chordata
- Class: Actinopterygii
- Division: Teleostei
- Order: Cyprinodontiformes
- Family: Poeciliidae
- Genus: Alfaro
- Species: A. huberi

Binomial name
- Alfaro huberi (Fowler, 1923)

Synonyms
- Priapichthys huberi Fowler, 1923; Furcipenis huberi (Fowler, 1923)

Species of fish

Alfaro huberi, also known as the Huber's Knife Livebearer, is a species of livebearer in the family Poeciliidae, in the New World subfamily Poeciliinae. It is found in clear, fast flowing streams in Central America where it has been recorded from Honduras, Guatemala and Nicaragua. This fish was formally described in 1923 as Priapichthys huberi by Henry Weed Fowler with the type locality given as Marceligo Creek which is a tributary of the Río Tunky at Miranda in Nicaragua. The specific name honours the Curator of Mammals at the Academy of Natural Sciences of Philadelphia Wharton Huber (1877–1942), a colleague of Fowlers, who collected the type.
