= Bactris caudata =

Conservation status
- Near Threatened (IUCN 3.1)

Scientific classification
- Kingdom: Plantae
- Clade: Tracheophytes
- Clade: Angiosperms
- Clade: Monocots
- Clade: Commelinids
- Order: Arecales
- Family: Arecaceae
- Genus: Bactris
- Species: B. caudata

Binomial name
- Bactris caudata H.Wendl. ex Burret

Synonyms
- Bactris dasychaeta Burret

Species of flowering plant

Bactris caudata is a species of flowering plant in the family Arecaceae. It is a shrub or tree with spiny leaves, compact inflorescences, and orange-red fruits. The species is native to Costa Rica, Nicaragua, and Panama.

Bactris caudata was described in 1934, and is listed as Near Threatened by the IUCN.

== Taxonomy ==
The species was first validly published by Max Burret in 1934, following an earlier invalid publication by Hermann Wendland.

== Distribution ==
Bactris caudata is native to the wet tropical biome of Costa Rica (Alajuela, Cartago, and Heredia), Nicaragua (Río San Juan and Zelaya), and Panama (Bocas del Toro).

Bactris caudata is found in lowland and pre-montane tropical forests, at elevations of up to 1,300 metres (4,300 ft).

== Description ==
Bactris caudata is a shrub or tree with solitary or clustered stems. It grows 1–6 metres (3.3–19.7 ft) high, and 2–2.4 centimetres (0.79–0.94 in) wide. The stems sometimes have spines.

The plant has five to eight leaves, which have nineteen to twenty-six pinnae on each side, and scattered black spines. The pinnae are arranged into irregular clusters. The spines are up to 6.5 centimetres (2.6 in) long. The leaf stems are 40–54 centimetres (16–21 in) long.

The inflorescences are compact, and grow on curved stems that are up to 11 centimetres (4.3 in) long. The female flowers are up to 3.5 millimetres (0.14 in) long. The calyx is cup-shaped, and up to 0.5 millimetres (0.020 in) long. The corolla is tube-shaped, and 2.5–3 millimetres (0.098–0.118 in) long. The plant flowers in February, April, June, August and November.

The fruits are orange-red, obovoid, 0.9–1.3 centimetres (0.35–0.51 in) long, and 1–1.2 centimetres (0.39–0.47 in) wide.

== Conservation ==
In 2021, the IUCN assessed Bactris caudata as Near Threatened. It is threatened by habitat loss. The species is found in protected areas, including Indio Maíz Biological Reserve, Cerro Silva Natural Reserve, La Selva Biological Station, Monteverde Cloud Forest Reserve, and Chagres National Park.
