= Mouriri gleasoniana =

Conservation status
- Least Concern (IUCN 3.1)

Scientific classification
- Kingdom: Plantae
- Clade: Tracheophytes
- Clade: Angiosperms
- Clade: Eudicots
- Clade: Rosids
- Order: Myrtales
- Family: Melastomataceae
- Genus: Mouriri
- Species: M. gleasoniana

Binomial name
- Mouriri gleasoniana Standl.

Species of flowering plant

Mouriri gleasoniana is a species of plant in the family Melastomataceae. It is found in Mexico and Panama.
