= Trimetopon =

Scientific classification
- Kingdom: Animalia
- Phylum: Chordata
- Class: Reptilia
- Order: Squamata
- Suborder: Serpentes
- Family: Colubridae
- Subfamily: Dipsadinae
- Genus: Trimetopon; Cope, 1885

Genus of snakes

Trimetopon is a genus of snakes in the family Colubridae. The genus is native to Costa Rica and Panama. Species in the genus Trimetopon are known commonly as tropical ground snakes.

== Species ==
The following six species are recognised as being valid:

- Trimetopon barbouri Dunn, 1930 – Barbour's tropical ground snake
- Trimetopon gracile (Günther, 1872) – Günther's tropical ground snake
- Trimetopon pliolepis Cope, 1894 – Cope's tropical ground snake
- Trimetopon simile Dunn, 1930 – Dunn's tropical ground snake
- Trimetopon slevini Dunn, 1940 – Slevin's tropical ground snake
- Trimetopon viquezi Dunn, 1937 – Víquez's tropical ground snake

Nota bene: A binomial authority in parentheses indicates that the species was originally described in a genus other than Trimetopon.
