= Trimetopon viquezi =

Conservation status
- Critically Endangered (IUCN 3.1)

Scientific classification
- Kingdom: Animalia
- Phylum: Chordata
- Class: Reptilia
- Order: Squamata
- Suborder: Serpentes
- Family: Colubridae
- Genus: Trimetopon
- Species: T. viquezi

Binomial name
- Trimetopon viquezi Dunn, 1937

Species of snake

Trimetopon viquezi, Viquez's tropical ground snake, is a species of snake in the family, Colubridae. It is found in Costa Rica.
