= Trimetopon gracile =

Conservation status
- Least Concern (IUCN 3.1)

Scientific classification
- Kingdom: Animalia
- Phylum: Chordata
- Class: Reptilia
- Order: Squamata
- Suborder: Serpentes
- Family: Colubridae
- Genus: Trimetopon
- Species: T. gracile

Binomial name
- Trimetopon gracile (Günther, 1872)

Species of snake

Trimetopon gracile, Günther's tropical ground snake, is a species of snake in the family, Colubridae. It is found in Costa Rica.
