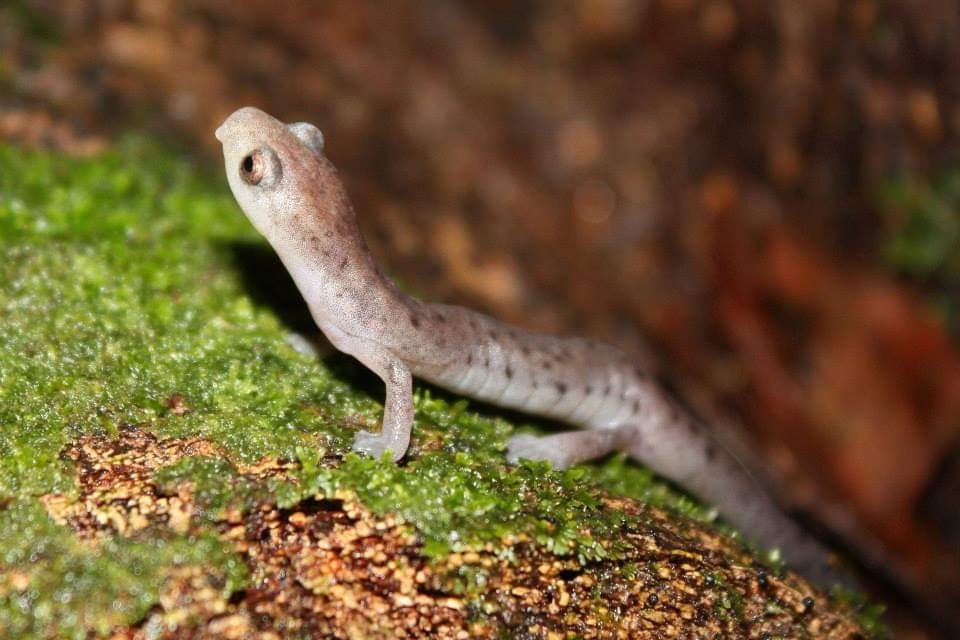

Conservation status
- Vulnerable (IUCN 3.1)

Scientific classification
- Kingdom: Animalia
- Phylum: Chordata
- Class: Amphibia
- Order: Urodela
- Family: Plethodontidae
- Genus: Bolitoglossa
- Species: B. alvaradoi

Binomial name
- Bolitoglossa alvaradoi Taylor,

Synonyms
- Bolitoglossa arborescandens Taylor, 1954

= Alvarado's salamander =

Species of amphibian

Bolitoglossa alvaradoi, also known as the Moravia de Chirripo salamander or Moravia de Chirripo mushroomtongue salamander, is a species of salamander in the family Plethodontidae. It is a medium-sized salamander for its genus, with females growing to a snout–vent length of 68–79 mm (2.7–3.1 in) and males reaching a snout–vent length of 57–65 mm (2.2–2.6 in). It is endemic to Costa Rica, where it is found along the Atlantic slopes in the center of the country. It is classified as being vulnerable by the IUCN and is threatened primarily by habitat loss.

== Taxonomy ==
Bolitoglossa alvaradoi was formally described in 1954 by Edward Harrison Taylor based on a female specimen collected from Moravia de Chirripo in the Limón Province of Costa Rica. Alongside B. alvaradoi, Taylor described another species, B. arborescandens, based on a male specimen collected from the same place. This male was later identified as a B. alvaradoi specimen representing one extreme of the color variation found in this species, leading to B. arborescandens being synonymized with the present species in 2002 by Jay Savage. The species is named after Don Fernando Alvarado Chacón, the owner of the type locality. The species has the English common names Moravia de Chirripo salamander and Moravia de Chirripo mushroomtongue salamander.

It is placed within the subgenus Pachymandra. A 2025 review of Costa Rican amphibians postulated that B. indio was synonymous with B. alvaradoi due to the similar appearance of the two species.

== Description ==
Bolitoglossa alvaradoi is a medium-sized salamander for its genus, with females growing to a snout–vent length of 68–79 mm (2.7–3.1 in) and males reaching a snout–vent length of 57–65 mm (2.2–2.6 in). The back is olive-green to dark brown with black flecking on the head and tail, with a black underside. Much of the back and tail has a pink to fawn hue.

== Distribution and habitat ==
Bolitoglossa alvaradoi is endemic to Costa Rica, where it is found along the Atlantic slopes in the center of the country. It inhabits lowland and premontane rainforests, where it is frequently seen on bromeliads, heart of palm trees, and leaves. It is known from elevations of 15 to 1,116 m (49 to 3,661 ft) and does not inhabit degraded forests.

== Conservation ==
Bolitoglossa alvaradoi is classified as being vulnerable by the IUCN. It has a fairly restricted range which is facing ongoing habitat degradation. It is primarily threatened by habitat degradation caused by agriculture and logging. Climatic changes driven by climate change may negatively impact the species. Salamander chytrid fungus, a pathogen that has devastated European salamander populations post its 2010 introduction to that continent, has not yet spread to the Americas, but still presents a future threat to the species if it ever spreads to Costa Rica. It occurs in several protected areas, including Braulio Carrillo National Park.
