= Trimetopon pliolepis =

Conservation status
- Least Concern (IUCN 3.1)

Scientific classification
- Kingdom: Animalia
- Phylum: Chordata
- Class: Reptilia
- Order: Squamata
- Suborder: Serpentes
- Family: Colubridae
- Genus: Trimetopon
- Species: T. pliolepis

Binomial name
- Trimetopon pliolepis Cope, 1894

Species of snake

Trimetopon pliolepis, also known as Cope's tropical ground snake, is a species of snake in the family Colubridae. It is found in Nicaragua, Costa Rica, and Panama.
