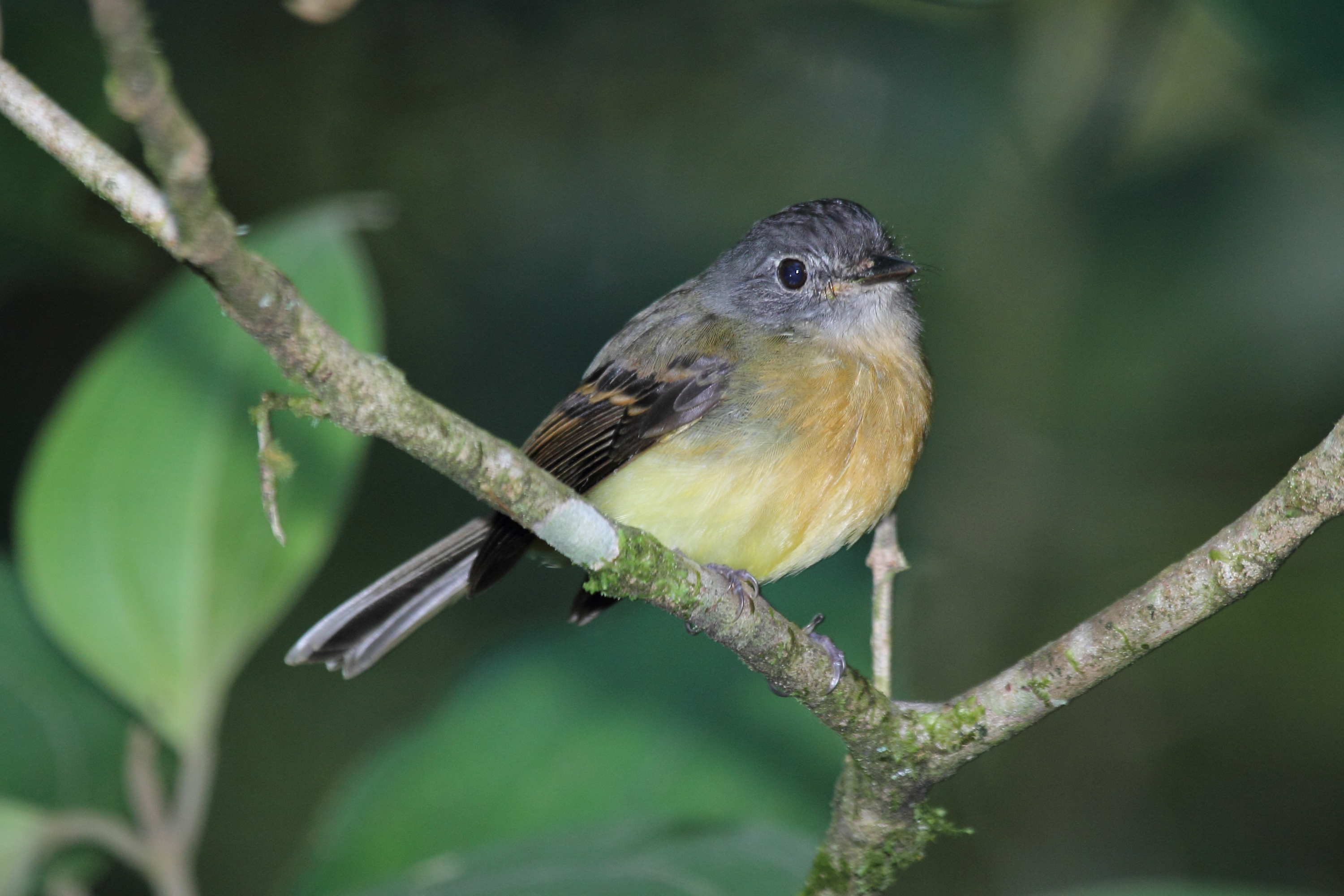

Conservation status
- Vulnerable (IUCN 3.1)

Scientific classification
- Kingdom: Animalia
- Phylum: Chordata
- Class: Aves
- Order: Passeriformes
- Family: Tyrannidae
- Genus: Aphanotriccus
- Species: A. capitalis

Binomial name
- Aphanotriccus capitalis (Salvin, 1865)

= Tawny-chested flycatcher =

Species of bird

The tawny-chested flycatcher (Aphanotriccus capitalis) is a small Vulnerable species of passerine bird in the family Tyrannidae, the tyrant flycatchers. It is found in Costa Rica and previously was also found in Nicaragua.

== Taxonomy and systematics ==
The tawny-chested flycatcher was originally described in 1865 as Myiobius capitalis. It was moved to the newly erected genus Aphanotriccus in 1905 with this species as the type specimen.

The tawny-chested flycatcher is monotypic. It shares genus Aphanotriccus with the black-billed flycatcher (A. audax).

== Description ==
The tawny-chested flycatcher is 12 to 13 cm (4.7 to 5.1 in) long and weighs about 11 g (0.39 oz). The sexes have almost the same plumage and resemble a more brightly colored version of an Empidonax flycatcher. Adult males have a dark gray crown, dark lores with a white stripe above them, and a broken white eye-ring. Females have an olive tinge on their crown. Both sexes have an olive-green nape, back, and rump with an ochraceous tinge on all but the rump. Their wings are dusky with bright ochraceous tips on the coverts that show as two wing bars and bright ochraceous edges on the secondaries and tertials. Their tail is dusky olive. Their throat is white with a buff tinge on its sides, their breast bright cinnamon-ochre, and their belly and undertail coverts yellow. They have a dark iris, a short black bill with a dull pinkish base to the mandible, and gray legs and feet.

== Distribution and habitat ==
The tawny-chested flycatcher is now known only from northeastern Costa Rica, on the Caribbean slope from Alajuela Province south to central Limón Province. There are historical records from near Lake Nicaragua and its outflow the San Juan River, much of which forms the border with Costa Rica. The species inhabits humid mature secondary forest in the upper tropical and subtropical zones. There it favors the forest's edges, natural clearings within it, and the edges of small watercourses. There are also records from cacao plantations. In elevation it ranges from sea level to 1,000 m (3,300 ft).

== Behavior ==
=== Movement ===
The tawny-chested flycatcher is a year-round resident.

=== Feeding ===
The tawny-chested flycatcher feeds on insects. It typically forages singly or in pairs and is not known to join mixed-species feeding flocks. It perches somewhat horizontally, from low to the ground up into the forest's mid-level, and always in dense vegetation. It captures prey with sallies from the perch to snatch it from foliage and branches.

=== Breeding ===
The only two observations of tawny-chested flycatcher breeding biology were reported in a 1999 paper. One nest was in a natural cavity where a branch had broken from a live Alchornea cistaricense tree about 1.5 m (5 ft) above the ground. A pair were carrying moss and other materials into the cavity. The nest was apparently abandoned before completion. The second nest was in a hollow section of a Guadua bamboo stalk about 6 m (20 ft) above the ground. Adults were carrying food into the crevice and were later seen feeding a fledgling near the nest. "This crevice nesting habit may aid in the conservation of the species; Guadua bamboo is widely introduced in the region for use in supporting banana trees on plantations."

=== Vocalization ===
The tawny-chested flycatcher's song is "a rapid chee chee spt’t cheew or chit it-it chee’yew [and] sometimes [a] more extensive choot choot choot ch-ch-ch-chttttree’ih".

== Status ==
The IUCN originally in 1994 ass assessed the tawny-chested flycatcher as Near Threatened and since 2000 as Vulnerable. It has a small range and its estimated population of between 6000 and 15,000 mature individuals is believed to be decreasing. "Logging, conversion to banana plantations and cattle-ranch expansion have resulted in widespread forest clearance and severe fragmentation, particularly in Costa Rica." It is considered "very uncommon" in Costa Rica. It is found in several protected areas. "Although this species has been found in cacao plantations and similar areas, it does not persist in small forest fragments."
