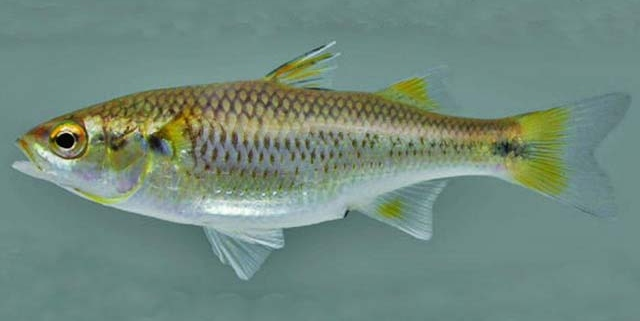
- Juvenile

Conservation status
- Least Concern (IUCN 3.1)

- Secure (NatureServe)

Scientific classification
- Kingdom: Animalia
- Phylum: Chordata
- Class: Actinopterygii
- Order: Mugiliformes
- Family: Mugilidae
- Genus: Dajaus; Valenciennes, 1836
- Species: D. monticola

Binomial name
- Dajaus monticola (Bancroft, 1834)
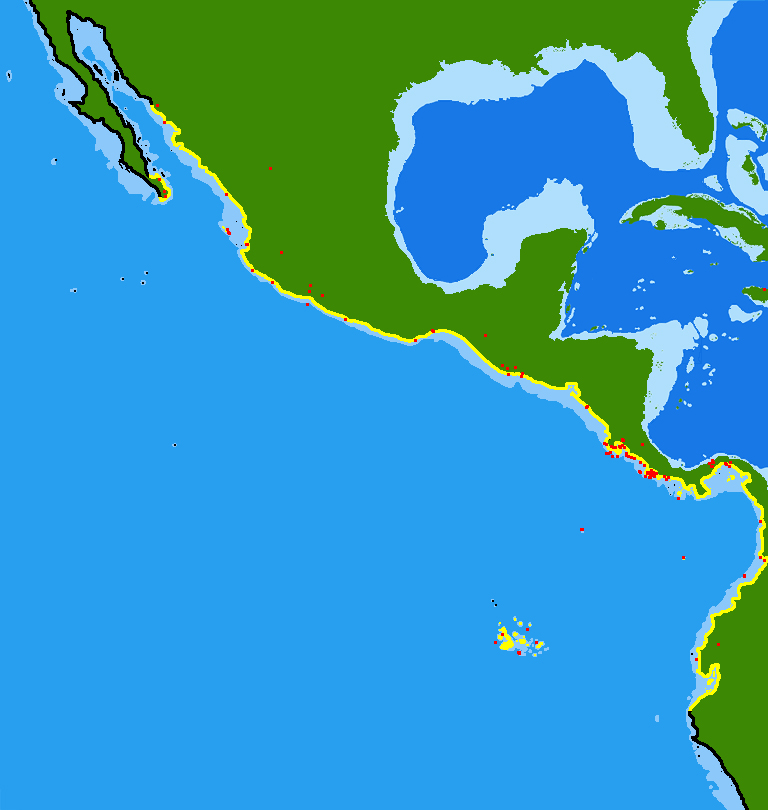

Synonyms
- List: Mugil monticola Bancroft, 1834; Agonostomus monticola (Bancroft, 1834); Mugil irretitus Gosse, 1851; Agonostoma nasutum Günther, 1861; Agonostoma percoides Günther, 1861; Agonostoma microps Günther, 1861; Agonostomus microps (Günther, 1861); Dajaus elongatus Kner, 1863; Neomugil digueti Vaillant, 1894; Agonostomus macracanthus Regan, 1907; Agonostomus salvini Regan, 1907; Joturus daguae C. H. Eigenmann, 1918; Agonostoma squamipinne Mohr, 1927; Agonostomus hancocki Seale, 1932

= Mountain mullet =

Species of ray-finned fish

The mountain mullet (Dajaus monticola) is a freshwater ray-finned fish of the family Mugilidae. It can be found in North and South America, from North Carolina, Florida, Louisiana and Texas in the United States to Colombia and Venezuela, including the West Indies in the Antilles. It is the only species in the monotypic genus Dajaus.

== Conservation ==
It is considered threatened in Costa Rica. It is found from sea level up to 650 m (2,130 ft) in altitude in the rivers of the Maquenque National Wildlife Refuge. It is common in the Toro Negro State Forest in central Puerto Rico. and in mountain rivers of the Dominican Republic.
