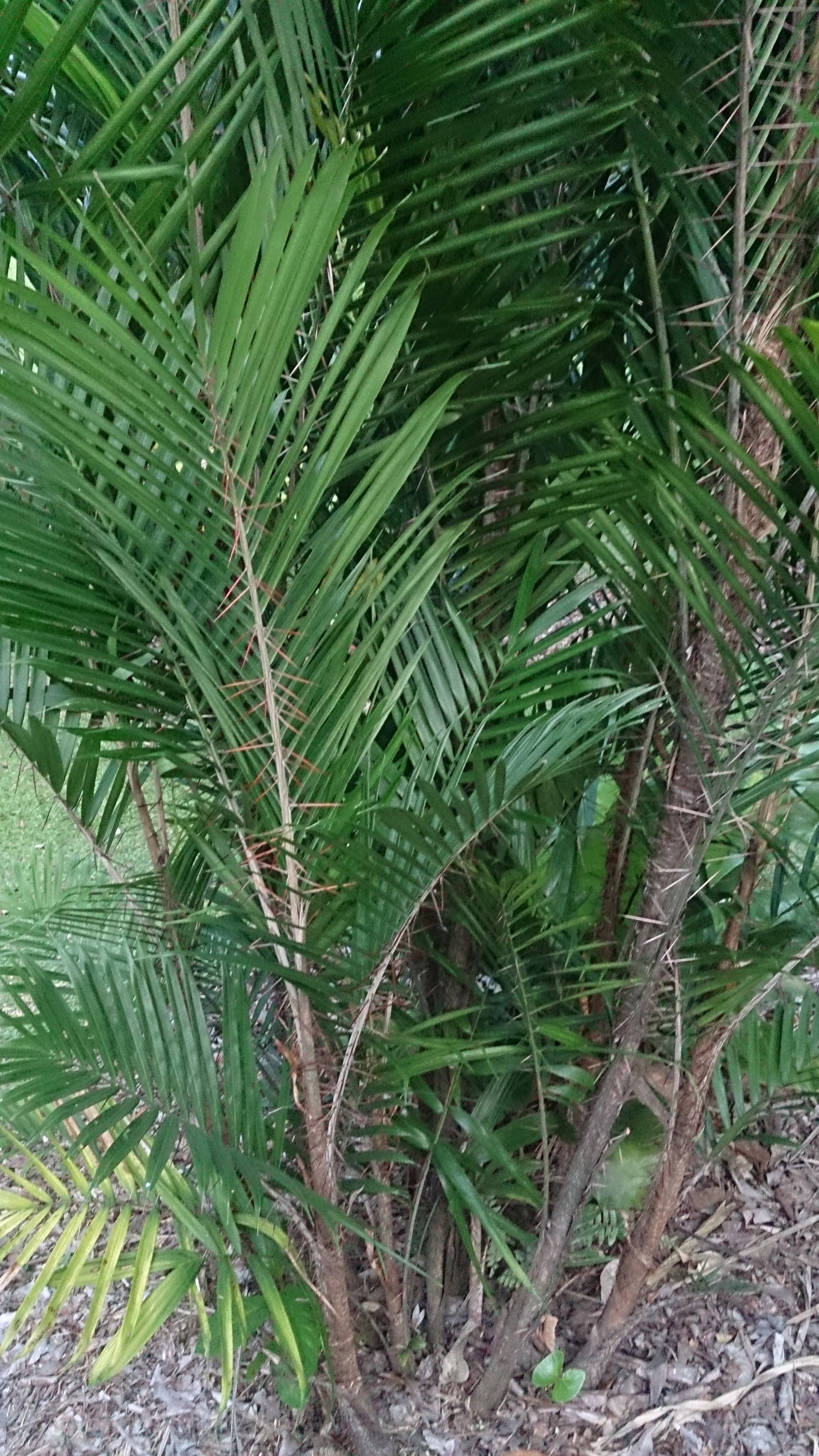

Scientific classification
- Kingdom: Plantae
- Clade: Tracheophytes
- Clade: Angiosperms
- Clade: Monocots
- Clade: Commelinids
- Order: Arecales
- Family: Arecaceae
- Genus: Bactris
- Species: B. major

Binomial name
- Bactris major Jacq.

Synonyms
- Bactris ovata Stokes (nom. illeg.); Augustinea major (Jacq.) H.Karst. Pyrenoglyphis major (Jacq.) H.Karst. (of Bactris major) Bactris chaetorhachis Mart. Bactris minax Miq. Augustinea balanoidea Oerst. Augustinea ovata Oerst. Bactris cruegeriana Griseb. Pyrenoglyphis balanoidea (Oerst.) H.Karst. Pyrenoglyphis ovata (Oerst.) H.Karst. Bactris balanoidea (Oerst.) H.Wendl. Bactris ovata (Oerst.) H.Wendl. (nom. illeg.); Bactris megalocarpa Trail ex Thurn; Bactris ottostapfiana Barb.Rodr. Bactris augustinea L.H.Bailey; Bactris superior L.H.Bailey; Pyrenoglyphis chaetorhachis (Mart.) Burret; Pyrenoglyphis ottostapfiana (Barb.Rodr.) Burret; Pyrenoglyphis superior (L.H.Bailey) Burret; Bactris albonotata L.H.Bailey; Bactris beata L.H.Bailey; Bactris broadwayi L.H.Bailey; Bactris cateri L.H.Bailey; Bactris ellipsoidalis L.H.Bailey; Bactris obovoidea L.H.Bailey; Bactris planifolia L.H.Bailey; Bactris swabeyi L.H.Bailey; Bactris demerarana L.H.Bailey; Pyrenoglyphis cruegeriana (Griseb.) H.Karst. Bactris major var. megalocarpa (Trail ex Thurn) A.J.Hend. (of Bactris major var. major) Bactris infesta Mart. Pyrenoglyphis infesta (Mart.) Burret; Bactris exaltata Barb.Rodr. Bactris nemorosa Barb.Rodr. Bactris socialis subsp. curuena Trail; Bactris socialis subsp. gaviona Trail; Bactris curuena (Trail) Trail ex Drude; Bactris gaviona (Trail) Trail ex Drude; Bactris chapadensis Barb.Rodr. Bactris major var. mattogrossensis Kuntze; Bactris mattogrossensis Barb.Rodr. Pyrenoglyphis chapadensis (Barb.Rodr.) Burret; Pyrenoglyphis curuena (Trail) Burret; Pyrenoglyphis exaltata (Barb.Rodr.) Burret; Pyrenoglyphis gaviona (Trail) Burret; Pyrenoglyphis mattogrossensis (Barb.Rodr.) Burret; Pyrenoglyphis nemorosa (Barb.Rodr.) Burret (of Bactris major var. infesta) Bactris socialis Mart. Pyrenoglyphis socialis (Mart.) Burret (of Bactris major var. socialis)

= Bactris major =

Species of palm

Bactris major is a small to medium-sized (1–10 m tall) spiny palm which ranges from Mexico, through Central America into northern South America and Trinidad. The species is divided into three or four varieties, although the boundaries between varieties is not always clearly defined.

The fruits are eaten or used to flavour drinks.

Spanish names for the palm species include marayaú.

== Varieties ==
Rafaël Govaerts recognised three varieties:

- Bactris major var. major
- Bactris major var. infesta (Mart.) Drude
- Bactris major var. socialis (Mart.) Drude

Andrew Henderson and co-authors recognised a fourth variety, Bactris major var. megalocarpa (Trail ex Thurn) A.J.Hend., but Govaerts considered this to be a synonym of Bactris major var. major.

== Gallery of images ==
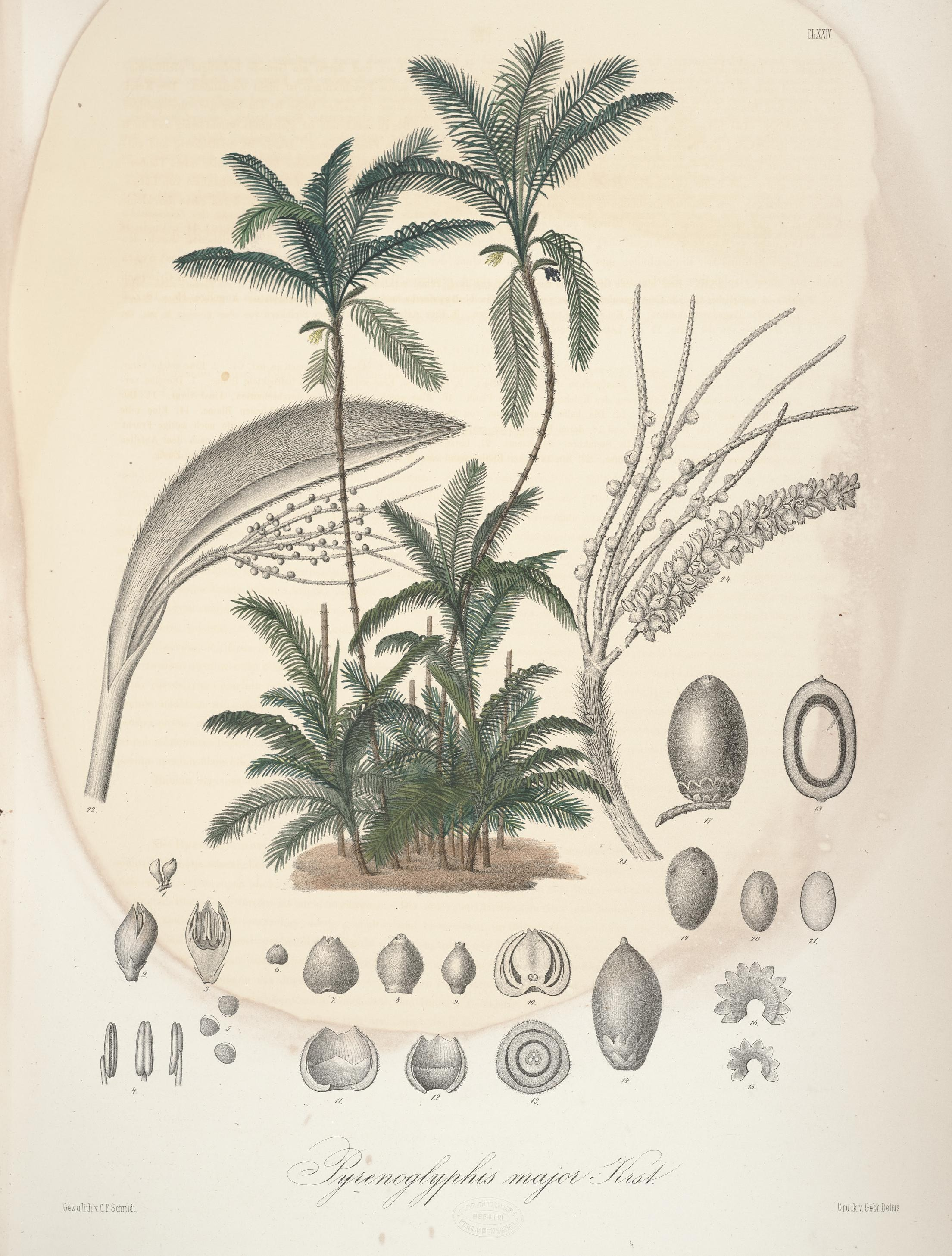

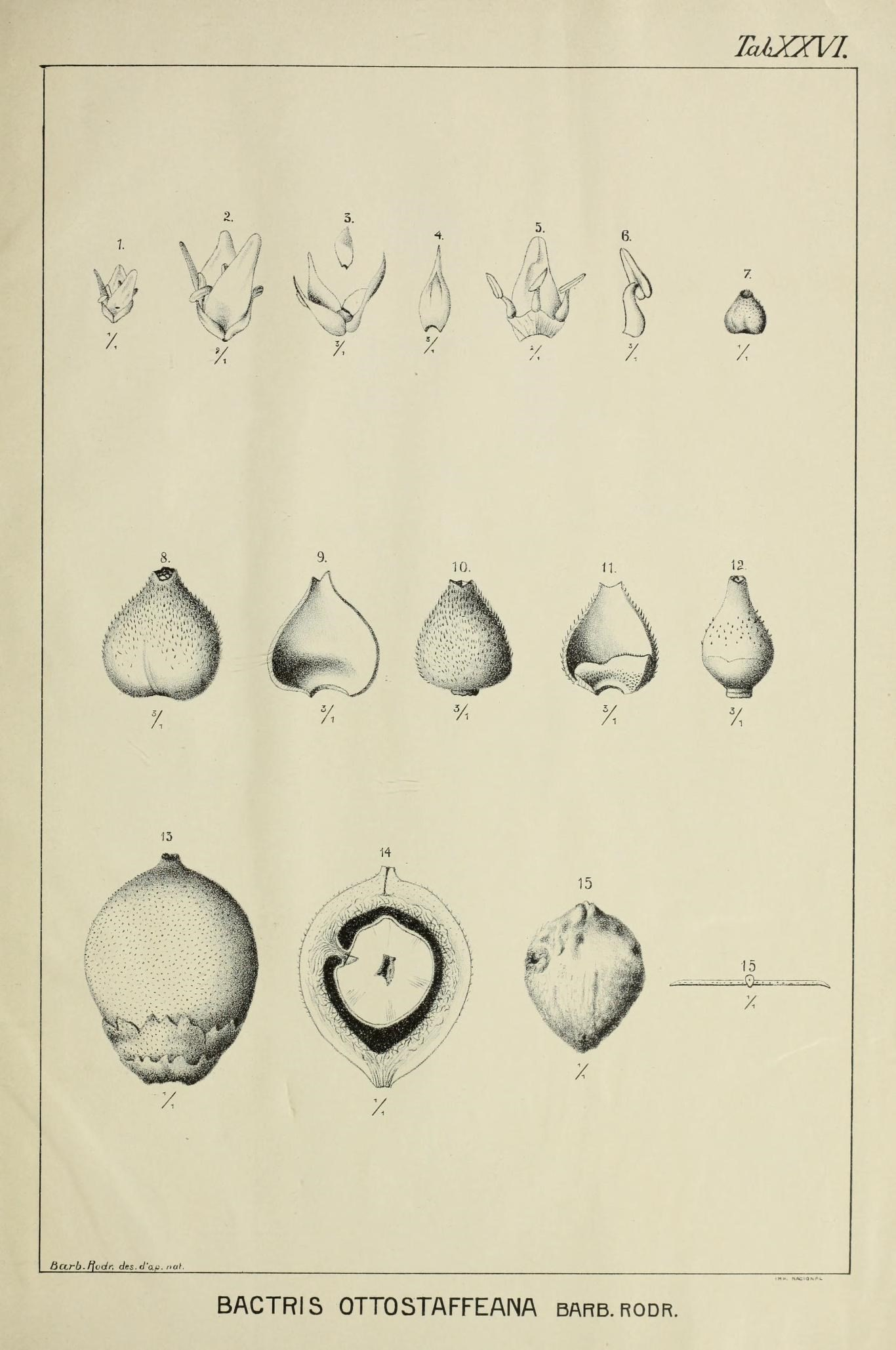

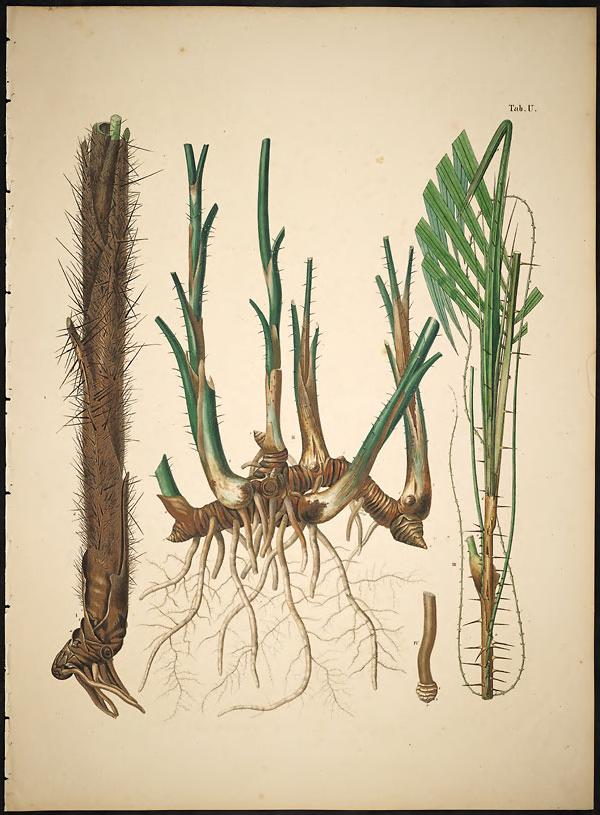
