= Cerro Silva Natural Reserve =

Nature reserve in Nicaragua

Coordinates: 11.7669151°N 84.0058852°W

Cerro Silva Natural Reserve is a nature reserve in Nicaragua. It is one of the 78 reserves that are under official protection in the country.
