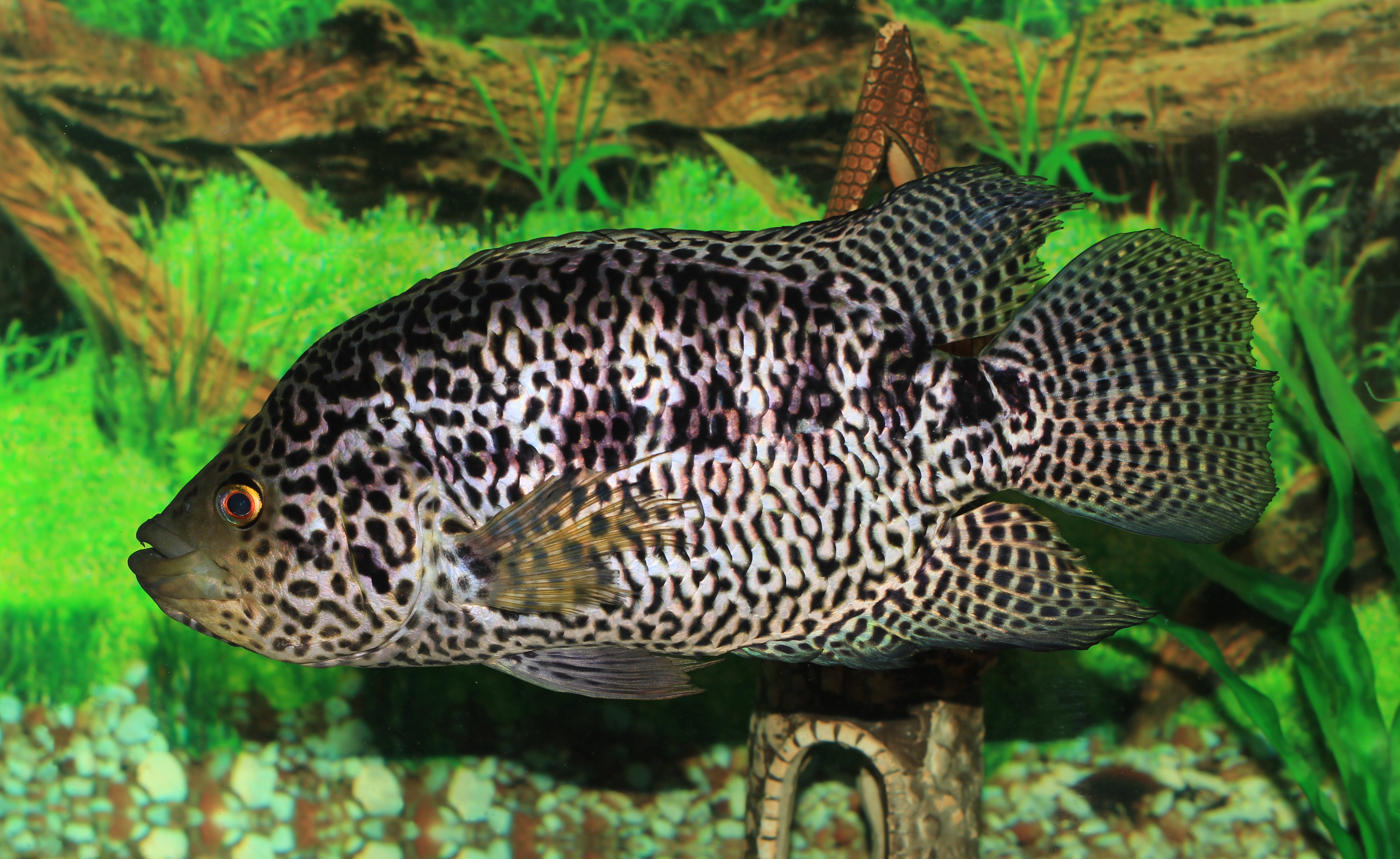

Conservation status
- Least Concern (IUCN 3.1)

Scientific classification
- Kingdom: Animalia
- Phylum: Chordata
- Class: Actinopterygii
- Order: Cichliformes
- Family: Cichlidae
- Genus: Parachromis
- Species: P. managuensis

Binomial name
- Parachromis managuensis (Günther, 1867)

Synonyms
- Parachromis gulosus Agassiz, 1859 (ambiguous synonym); Heros managuensis Günther, 1867; Cichlasoma managuense (Günther, 1867); Herichthys managuense (Günther, 1867); Nandopsis managuense (Günther, 1867)

= Parachromis managuensis =

Species of cichlid fish

Parachromis managuensis is a large species of cichlid native to freshwater habitats in Central America, where it is found from Honduras to Costa Rica. The binomial name refers to Lake Managua in Nicaragua, from which the holotype was obtained. It is a food fish and is also found in the aquarium trade where it is variously known as the jaguar cichlid, managuense cichlid, managua cichlid, guapote tigre, Aztec cichlid, spotted guapote and jaguar guapote. In Costa Rica, it is known as the guapote tigre.

== Description ==
P. managuensis is a robust fish with a silvery or golden-green to purple colour, with a darker moss green shade at the dorsum. The sides show a purple iridescence and the belly is whitish or yellowish. A series of several large black dots then run horizontally along the lateral line area. The fins are often a dark to black coloration, especially when in spawning coloration. The most distinguished feature is a black stripe than run from the eye to the opercular margin. Males grow to a total length of 65 centimetres (26 in) and females to 40 centimetres (16 in). The female also lacks the elongated extensions to the dorsal fins.

== Ecology ==
P. managuensis inhabits lakes and prefers turbid waters with mud bottoms and is tolerant of eutrophic and hypoxic conditions. It is a carnivorous, highly predatory species. Adults feed mainly on small fish, while juveniles rely on a variety of macroinvertebrates. It prefers turbid, eutrophic lakes, often found in warm water depleted of oxygen. Its native substrate is mud-bottoms, but it can also be found in ponds and springs with sandy bottoms covered in plant debris. The species inhabits lakes in a tropical climate and prefers water with a 7.0–8.7 pH, a water hardness of 10–15 dGH, and a temperature range of 25 to 36 °C (77 to 97 °F).

== Distribution ==
The natural distribution of P. managuensis goes from the Ulúa River in Honduras to Matina River basin in Costa Rica. However, it has been introduced in other countries in Central America, as well as in the United States, as a food source, for aquarism and to control fish populations.

=== Conservation status ===
This species has been assessed by the IUCN Red List as least-concern species. It occurs in the Maquenque National Wildlife Refuge.

== See also ==
- List of freshwater aquarium fish species
