= Gert Chesi =

Austrian photographer and author

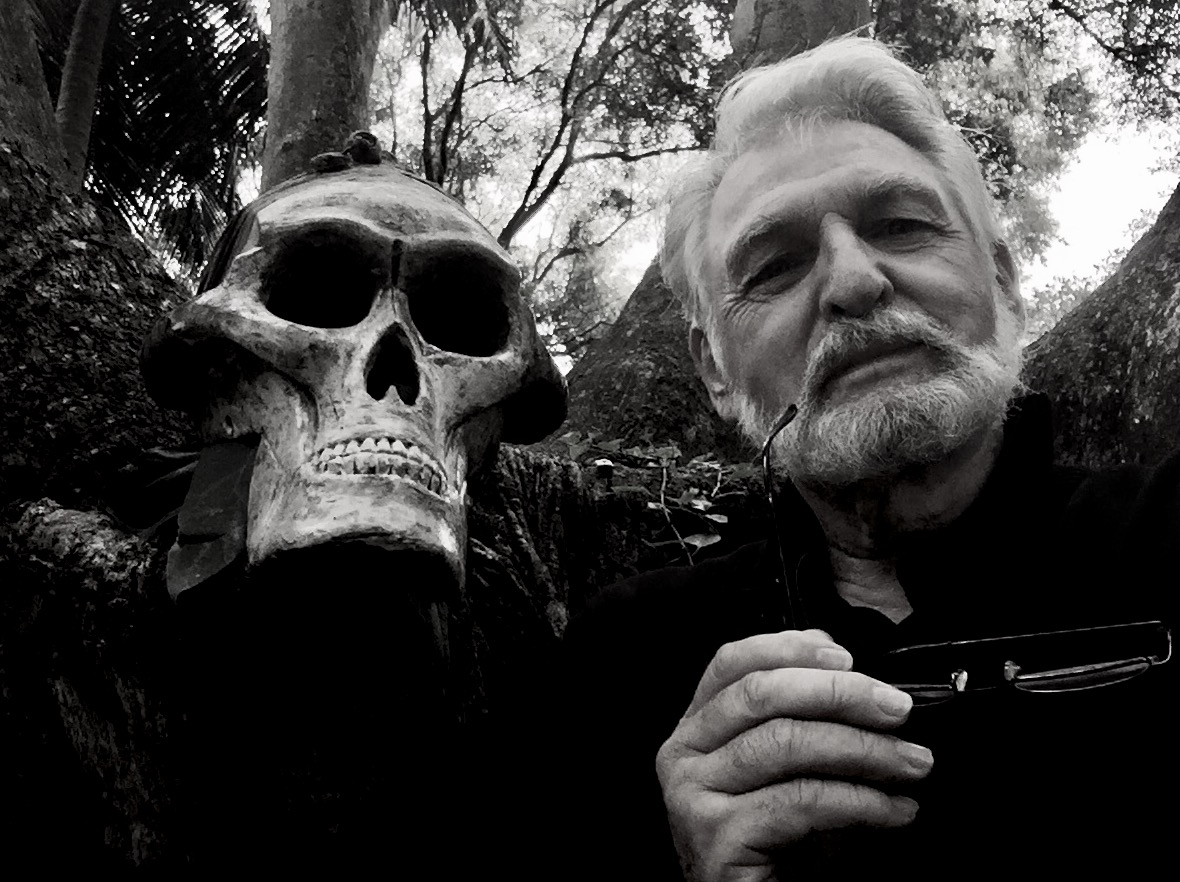
Gert Chesi in the Voodoo forest.

Gert Chesi (born 22 August 1940) is an Austrian photographer, author, journalist and filmmaker. At the end of the 1970s he became internationally famous after publishing the book Last Africans, which was translated into six languages. In 1995 Gert Chesi founded the Haus der Völker in Schwaz, which is a museum for tribal art and ethnography.

Today Gert Chesi lives in Togo, Thailand and Austria.

== Life ==
=== Early life ===
Born in Schwaz, Tyrol, at an early age, Gert Chesi traveled to distant countries.

In 1959 he worked as a freelance journalist and photographer for local newspapers to report on his experiences. In his Tyrolean home he was soon considered a lateral thinker, who refused to nationalist tendencies. His world view did not always correspond to the valid thought patterns.

In the 1970s Chesi and Bert Breit point out the untenable conditions in the Tyrolean country girls' educational center St. Martin in Schwaz. These pictures of his photo documentary are an early testimony of the civil-society protest against state welfare education and forced education in Tyrol. In those days, penal isolation was part of education of state welfare education.

=== Foundation of the jazzclub, Studio 12 & Gallery Eremitage ===
In 1958 Chesi founded the first jazz club in western Austria, the Studio 12 in Schwaz. The Studio 12 played jazz provoked the Schwazer population, who did not know what to do with the "Negro music". For Chesi, jazz meant a commitment to freedom and liberation. He did not fit into the conservative, prudish and restrictive world of the petty bourgeoisie of the post-war era.

In 1963 Gert Chesi became a freelancer for Österreichischer Rundfunk and organized the "Schwazer September," a music and art festival in Schwaz.

1964 saw the opening of the gallery "Eremitage Schwaz". Artists such as Ernst Fuchs (artist), Hilde Goldschmidt and Hans Staudacher exhibited at the Eremitage. In the following years, Chesi transformed this cultural institution from a gallery to a jazz club. The motivation of his work was the desire to make the cultures of the world known locally.

From these beginnings of jazz music in Tyrol developed an international forum in which American, Japanese Brazilian and European jazz greats of this time have occurred. Together with Jup Rathgeber he was one of the pioneers of the avant-garde Schwaz art and culture scene.

For example, Chick Corea, Gilberto Gil, Lester Bowie, Gerry Hemingway, Meredith Monk, Dave Holland, Art Ensemble of Chicago, George Russel, Don Moye, Dino Saluzzi and Kelvyn Bell performed in Schwaz.

The Eremitage is an integral part of the Tyrolean cultural scene and is run as a cultural café and cultural restaurant. Regular international jazz concerts and cabaret projects take place.

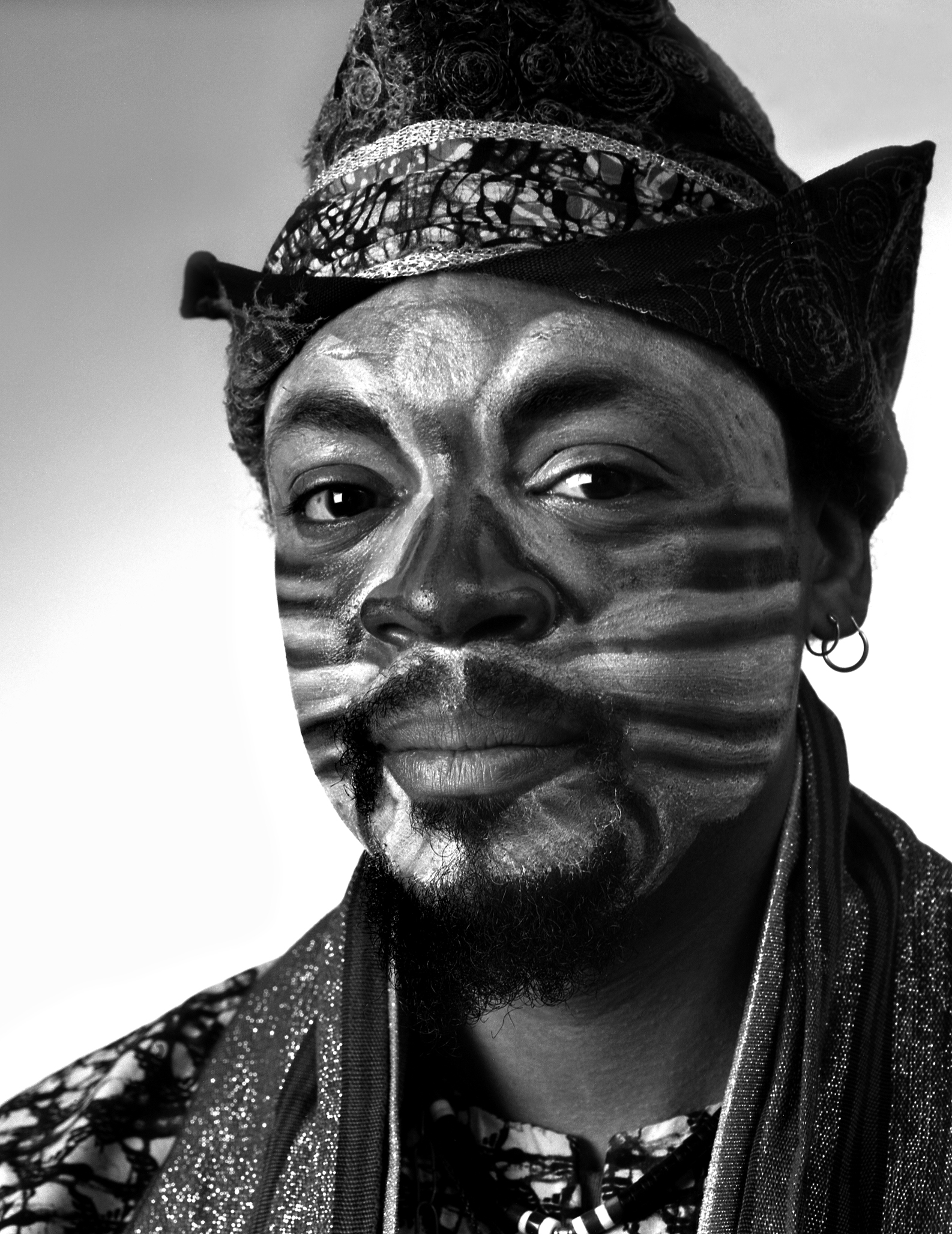
Don Moye

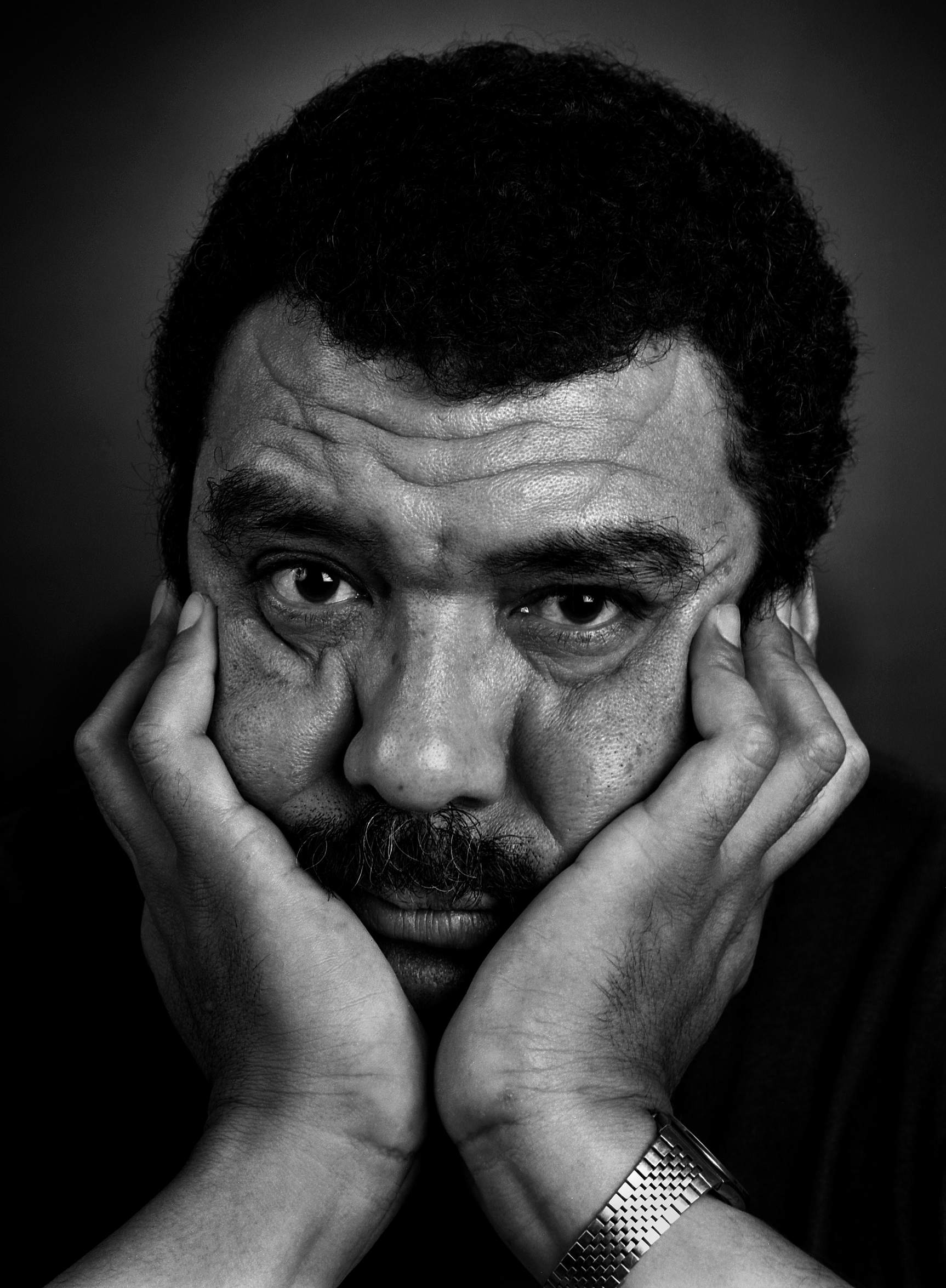
Dino Saluzzi

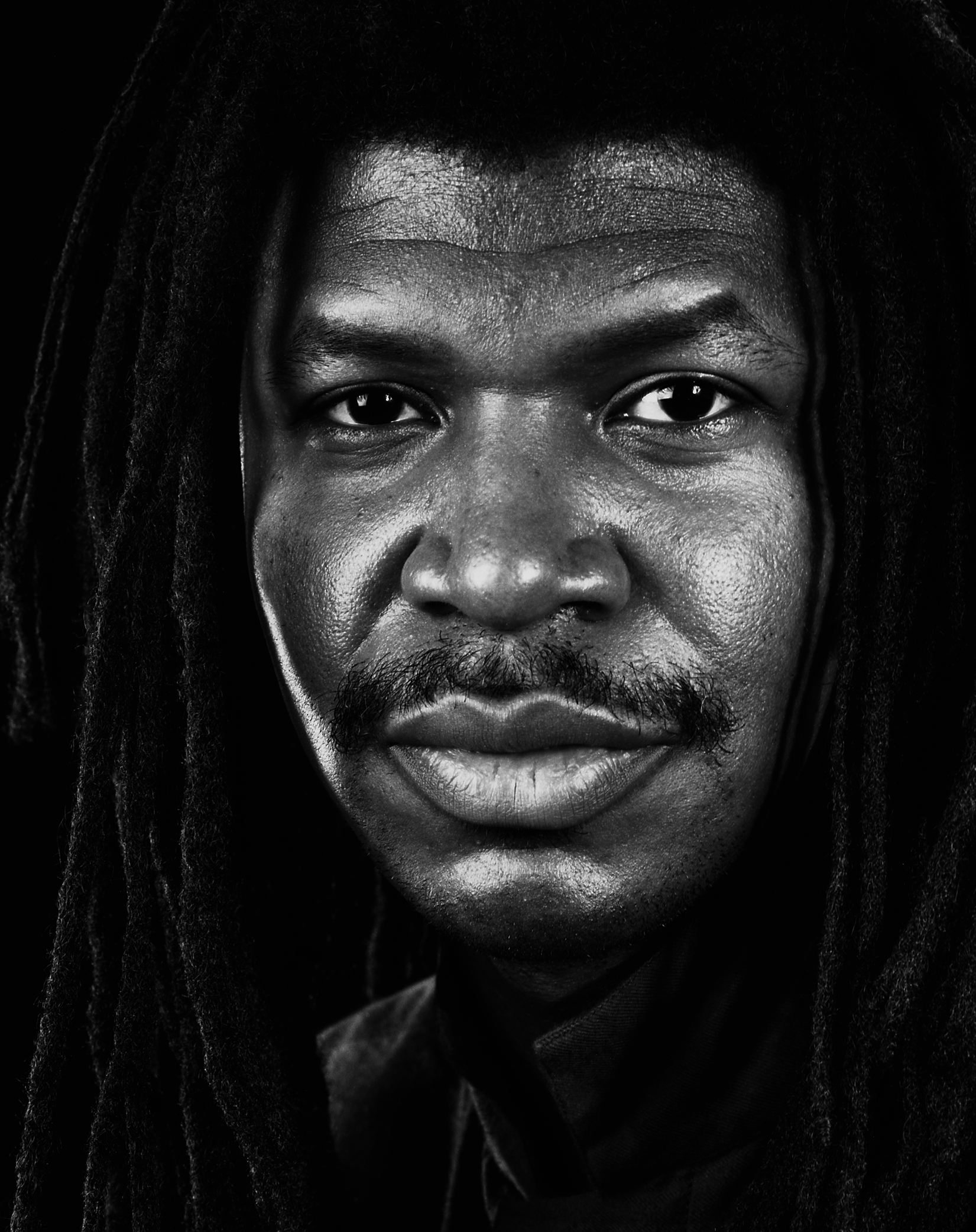
Kelvyn Bell

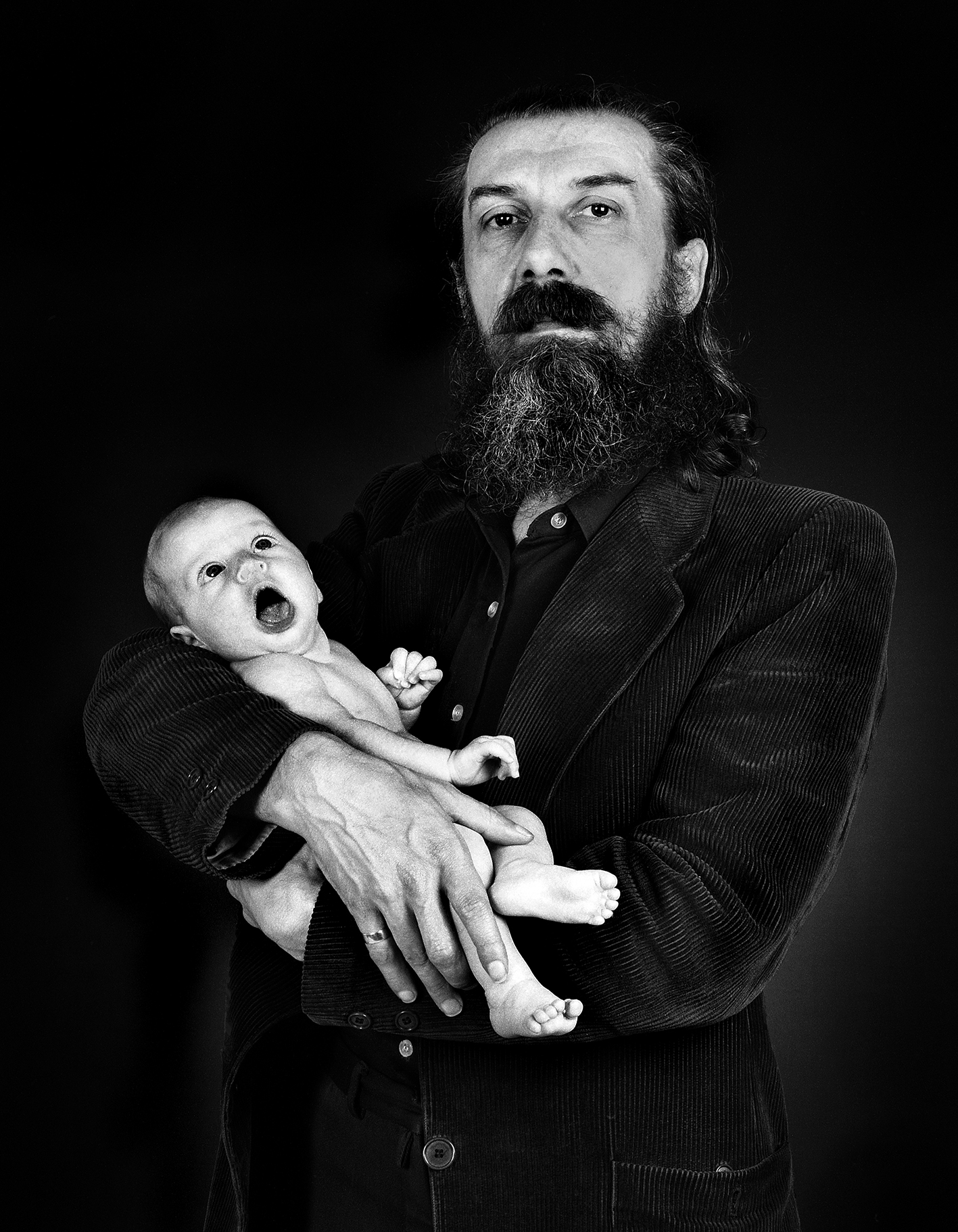
Jup Rathgeber

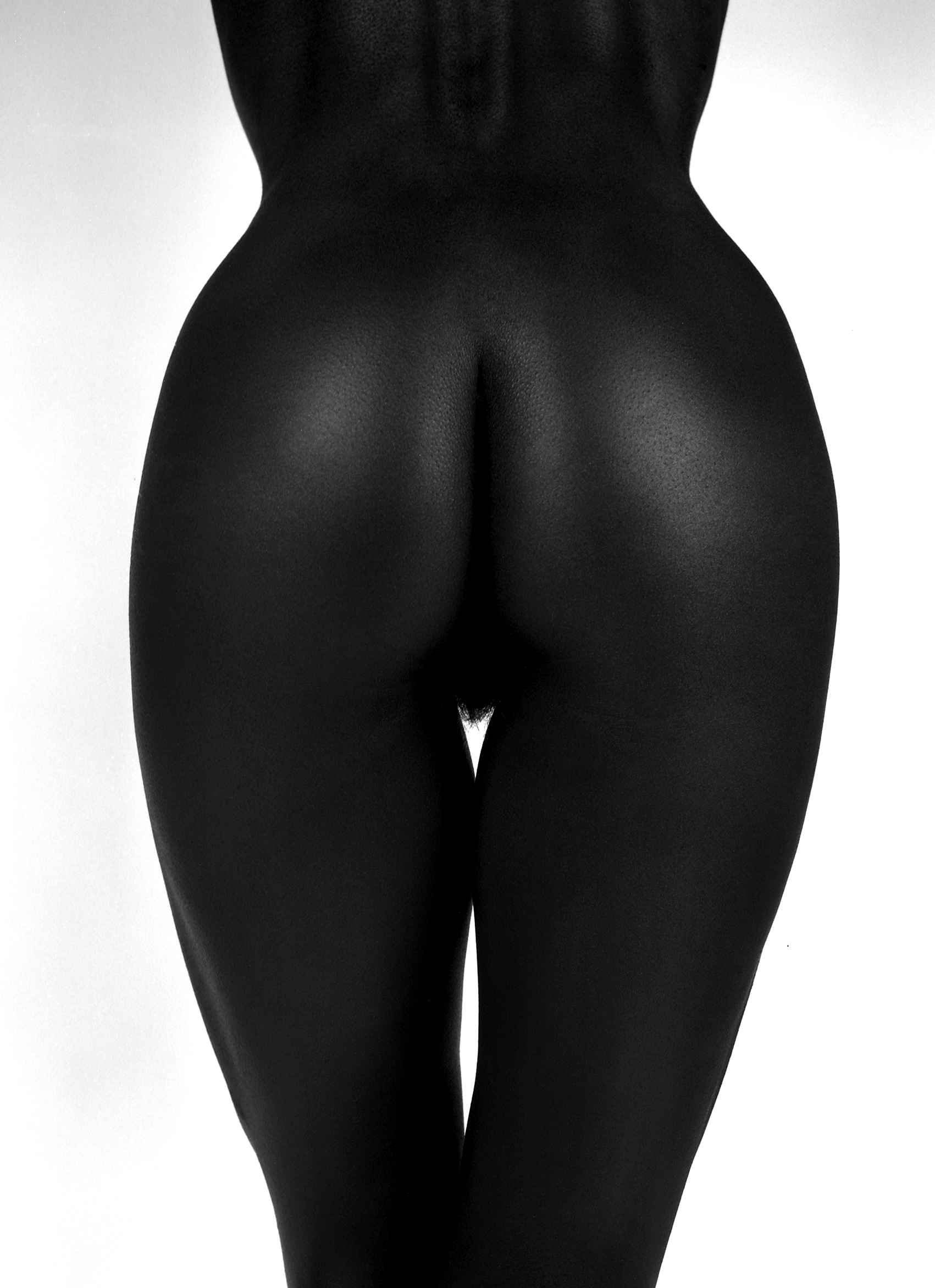
Anatomie eines Aktes

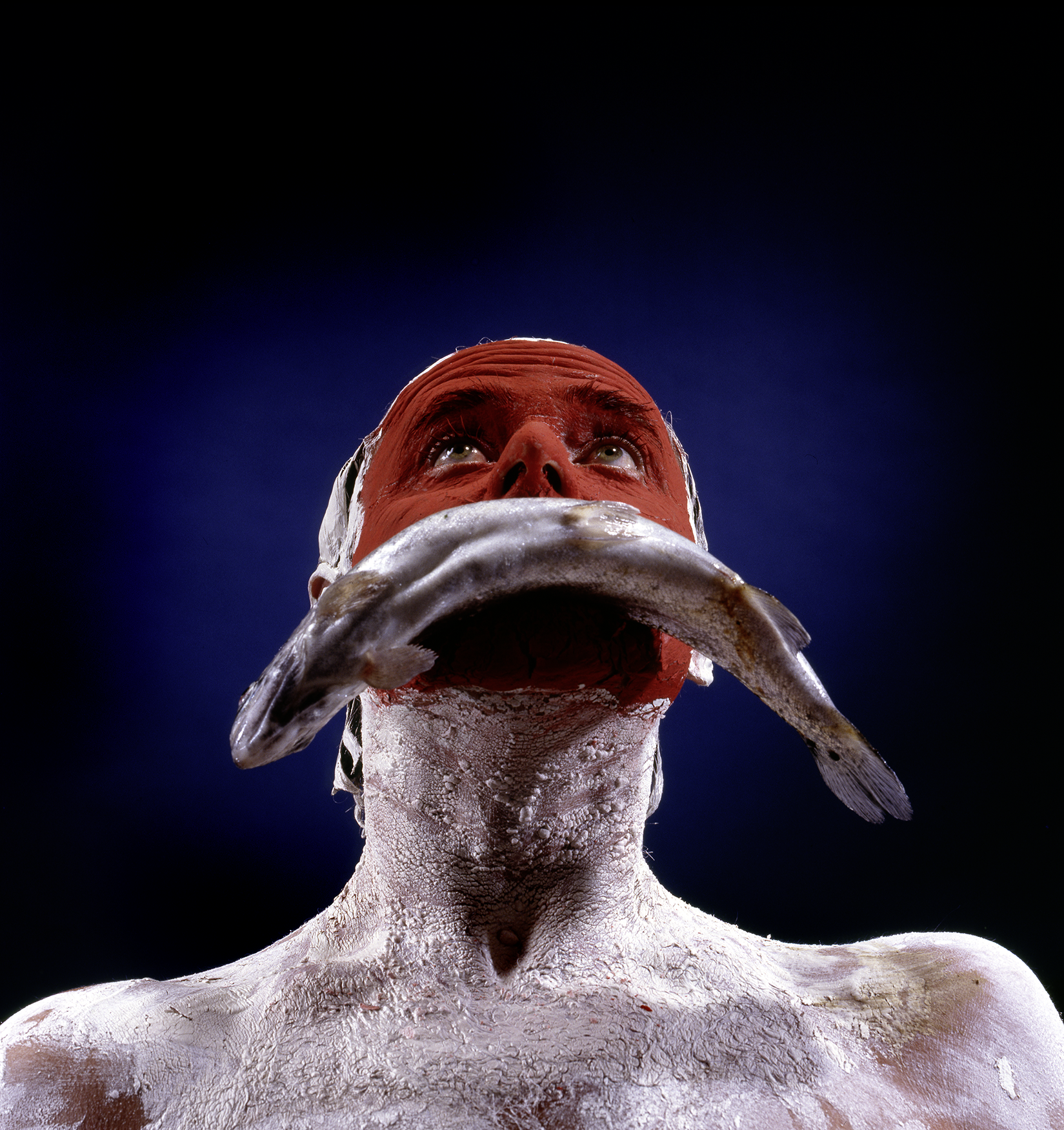
Paläolithische Aktion

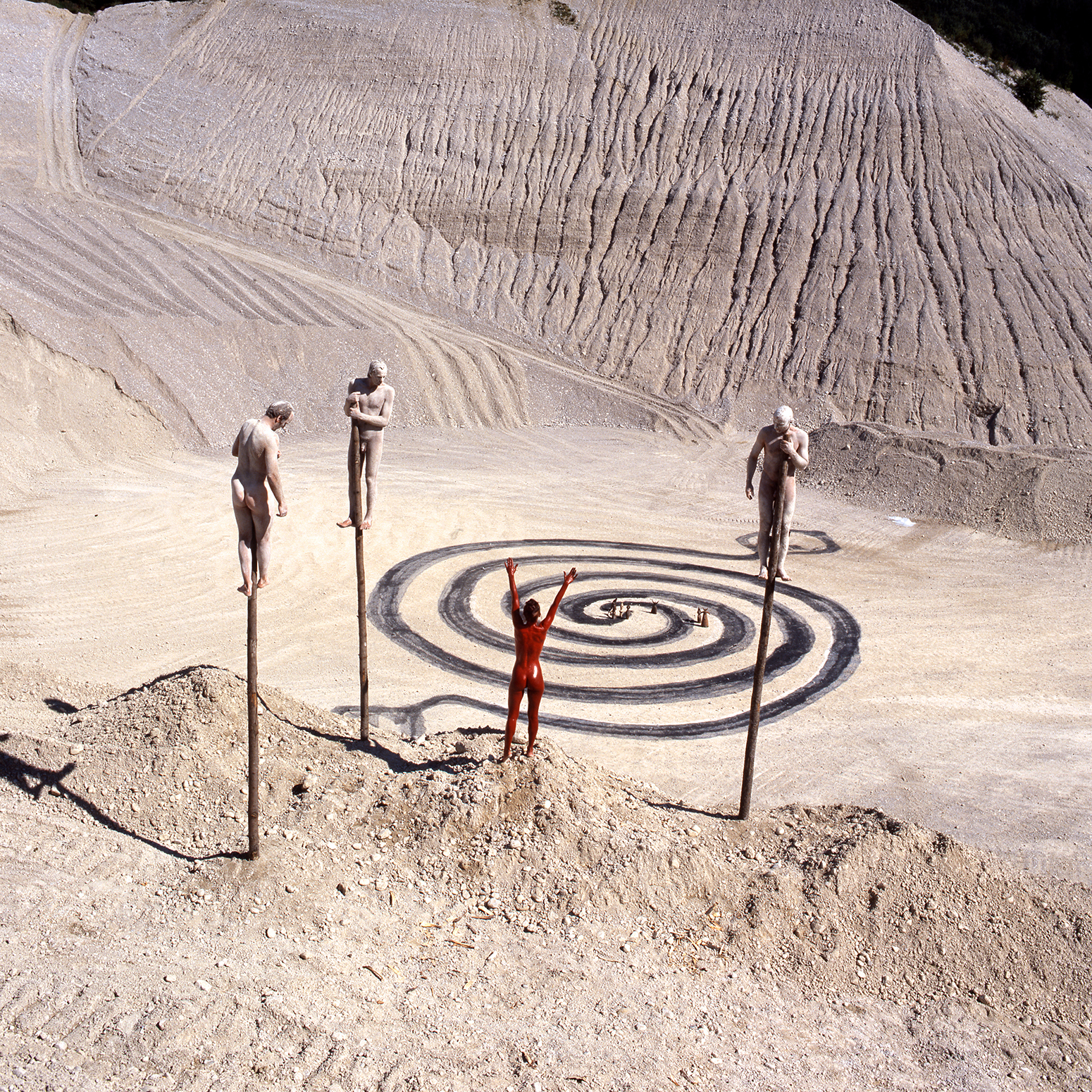
Paläolithische Aktion

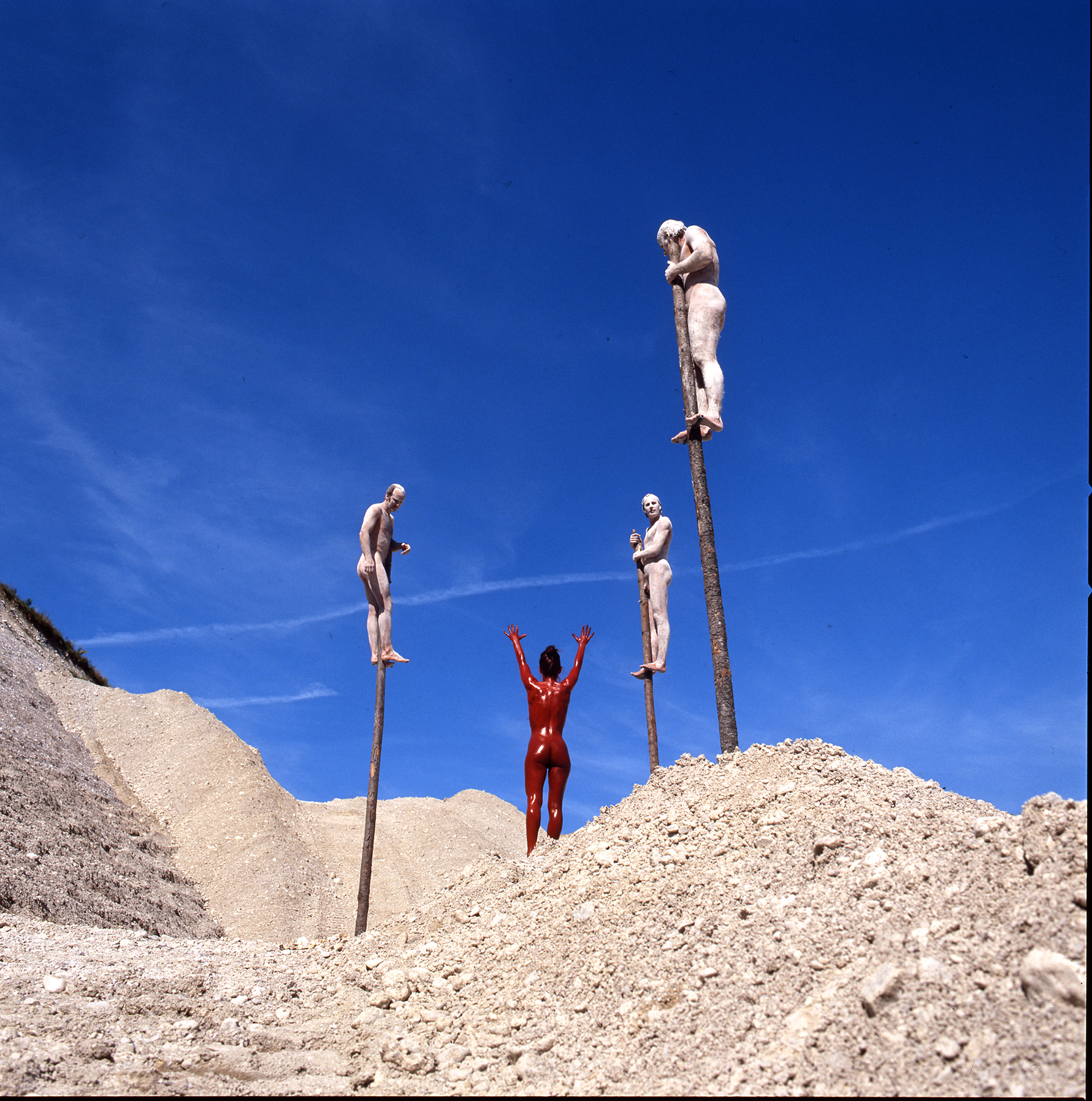
Paläolithische Aktion

=== Work as an ethnographer ===
In 1961 he made a major five-month motorcycle trip, which led him across Jordan to Sudan. This journey marks the beginning of his journalistic work dealing with the peoples and cultures of the world.

In 1964, Gert Chesi visited Albert Schweitzer in Lambarene, Gabon and stayed for eight months as an employee in the Lepradorf. This was followed by publications on Lambarene and the work of Albert Schweitzer. When Schweitzer died in 1965, Chesis' photos were the latest available recordings by Albert Schweitzer, and accordingly they were sought after by the media. The Quick (magazine) bought these shots and Chesis's basis for the photojournalist was laid.

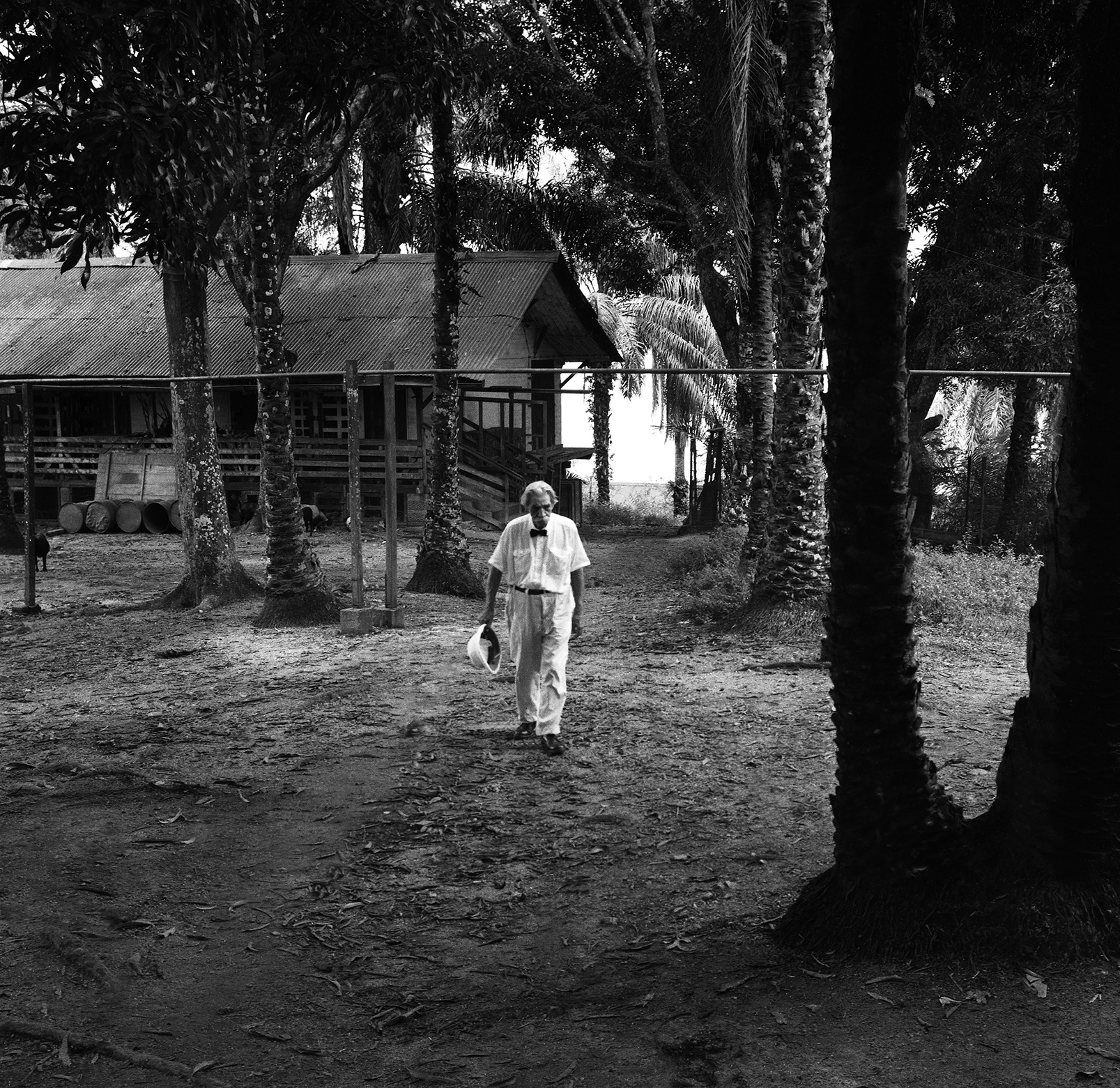
Albert Schweitzer, Lambarene 1964

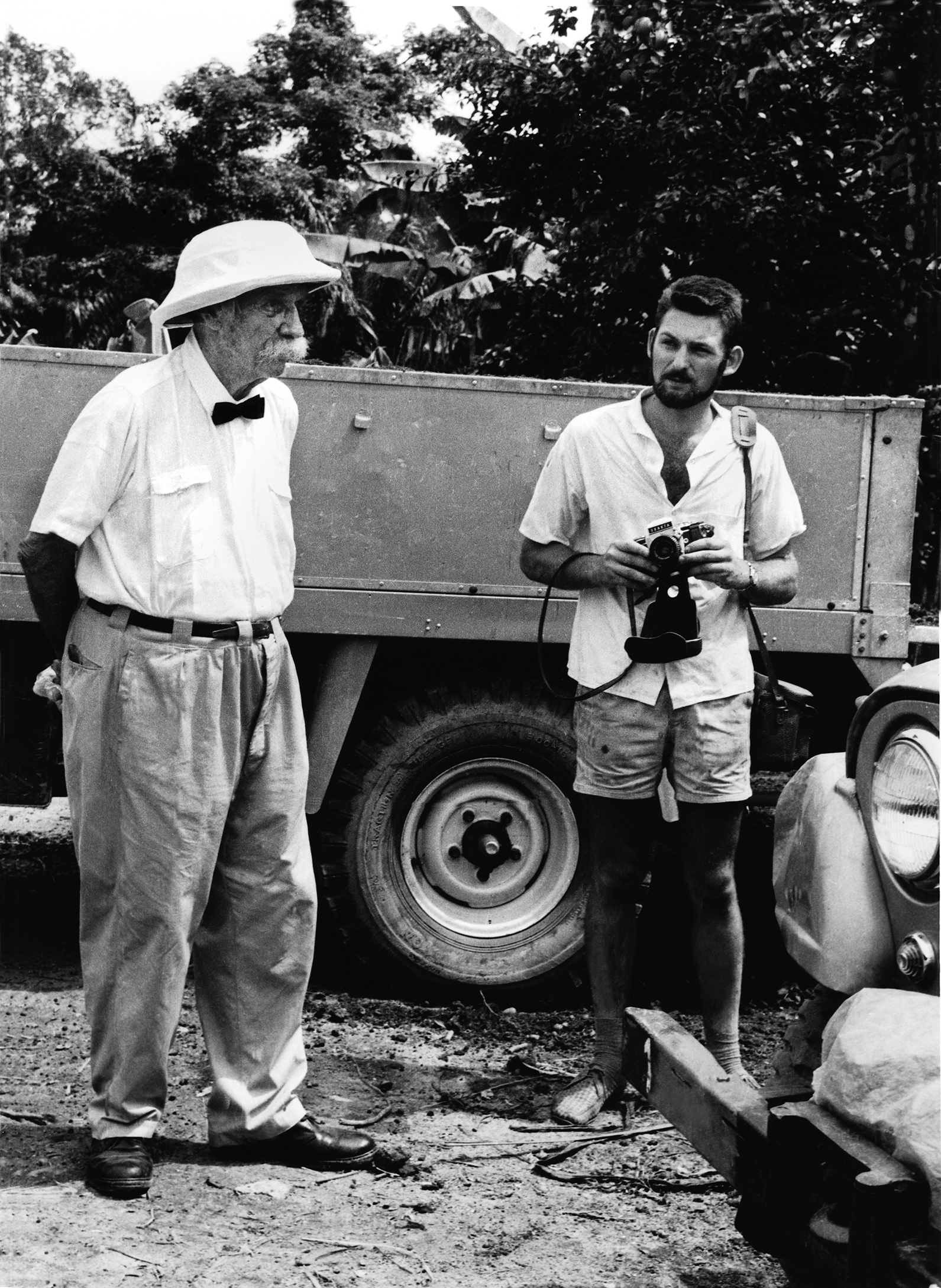
Albert Schweitzer with Gert Chesi, Lambarene 1964

This time in Africa also marks the beginning of his collecting activity and his occupation with African art. The Museum der Weltkulturen, Frankfurt acquired 18,000 photos from this period. From 1965 Gert Chesi wrote numerous publications on art and ethnographic topics in national media and the ORF. Between 1967 and 1977 he was present in continuous series. In 1969 he organized exhibitions of African art, organized his lecture tours in Germany, Austria and Switzerland and exhibited his photographs in national galleries and museums the following year.

His ethnomusical sound recordings culminated in the release of the double album "Black Magic".

In 1975, his first illustrated book The Last Africans was published in six languages. As a result, several lectures and exhibitions took place. Among them was an exhibition of African art from the Chesi collection in the Musee des beaux Arts Grenoble and the Galerie Numaga Switzerland. In the same year he published texts and picture contributions in GEO, Stern, Ambiente and scientific journals.

=== Voodoo ===
In 1978 Gert Chesi devoted himself to African-American syncretism in West Africa, Haiti and Brazil (Voodoo).

The illustrated book Voodoo: Africa's Secret Power was published in four languages. 1979 followed several study and work trips to the Philippines and Africa. For this purpose, the band Faith Healers in the Philippines was published in 1980. At the same time he worked on the "Encyclopaedia Togolais" on behalf of the President. Further work trips to Africa in 1982 were followed by the book publication Medicine of the Black Gods (German: Die Medizin der schwarzen Götter) As well as book participations in Africa - Enthralled by a Continent (German: Afrika - Im Banne eines Kontinents) and Colon - the black picture of the white man (German: Colon - Das schwarze Bilde des weißen Mannes). 1983 followed Susanne Wenger - A Life with the Gods in Their Yoruba Homeland (German: Susanne Wenger - Ein Leben mit den Göttern).

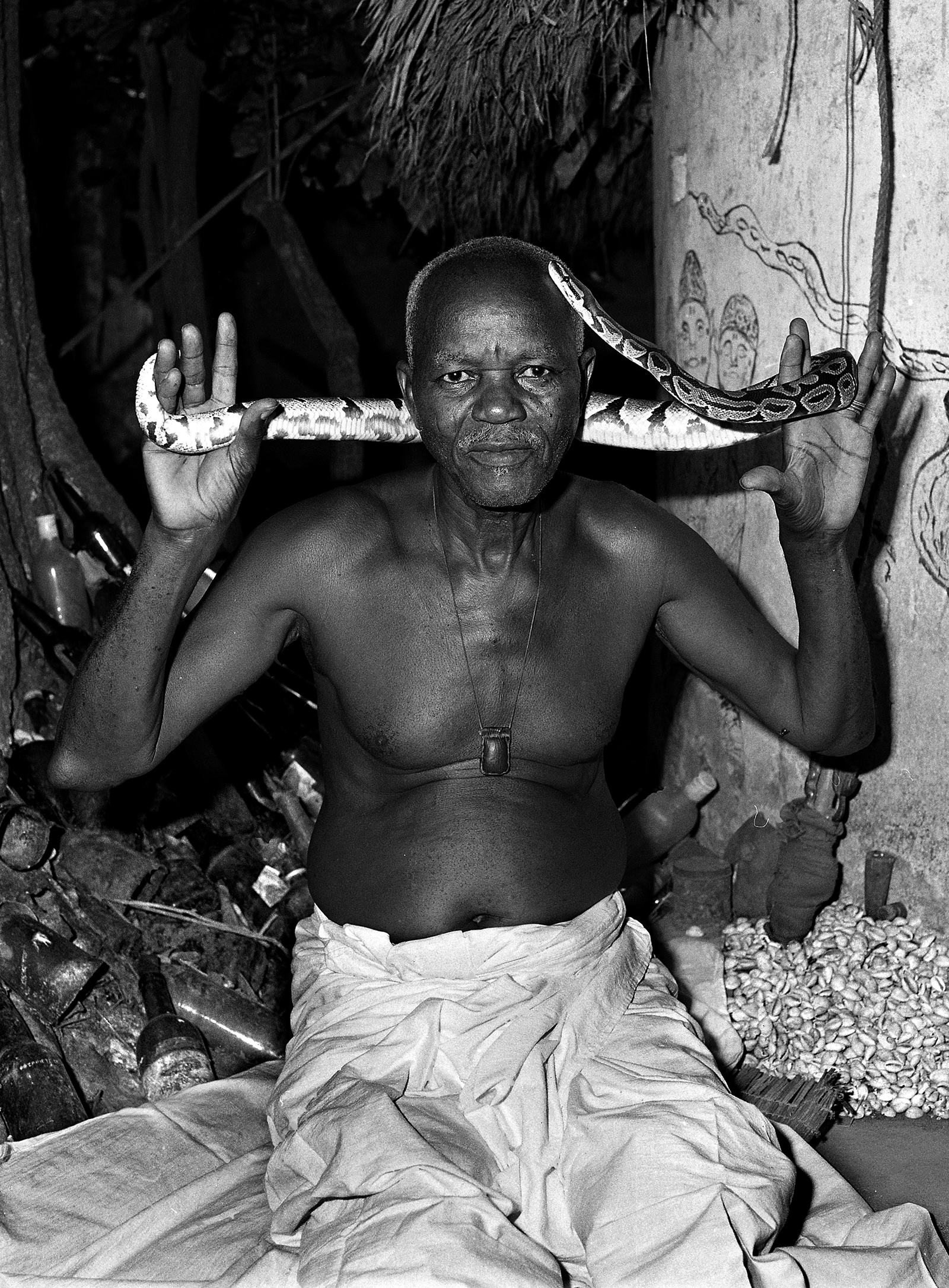
Voodoo West Africa 1978

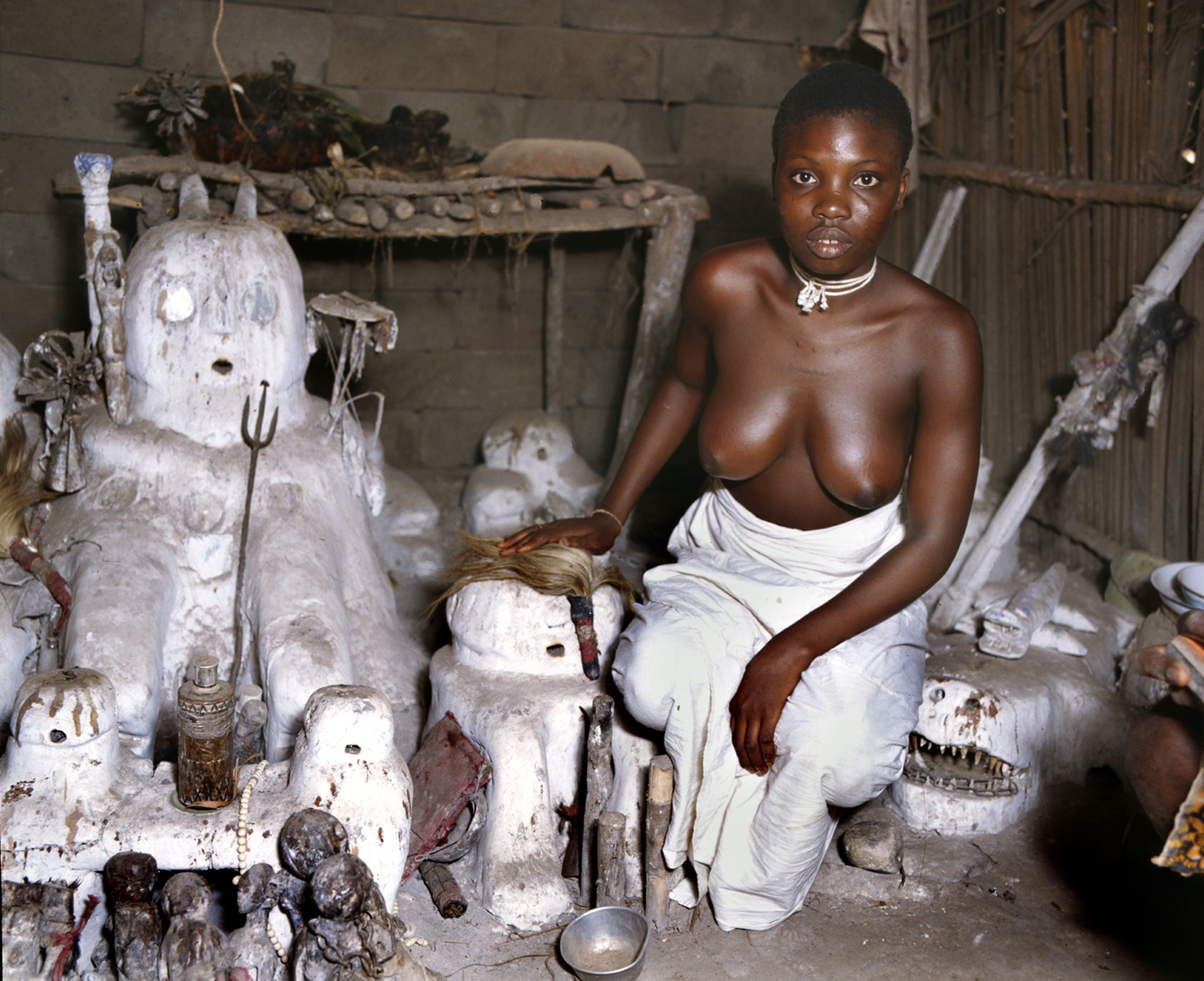
Voodoo West Africa 1981

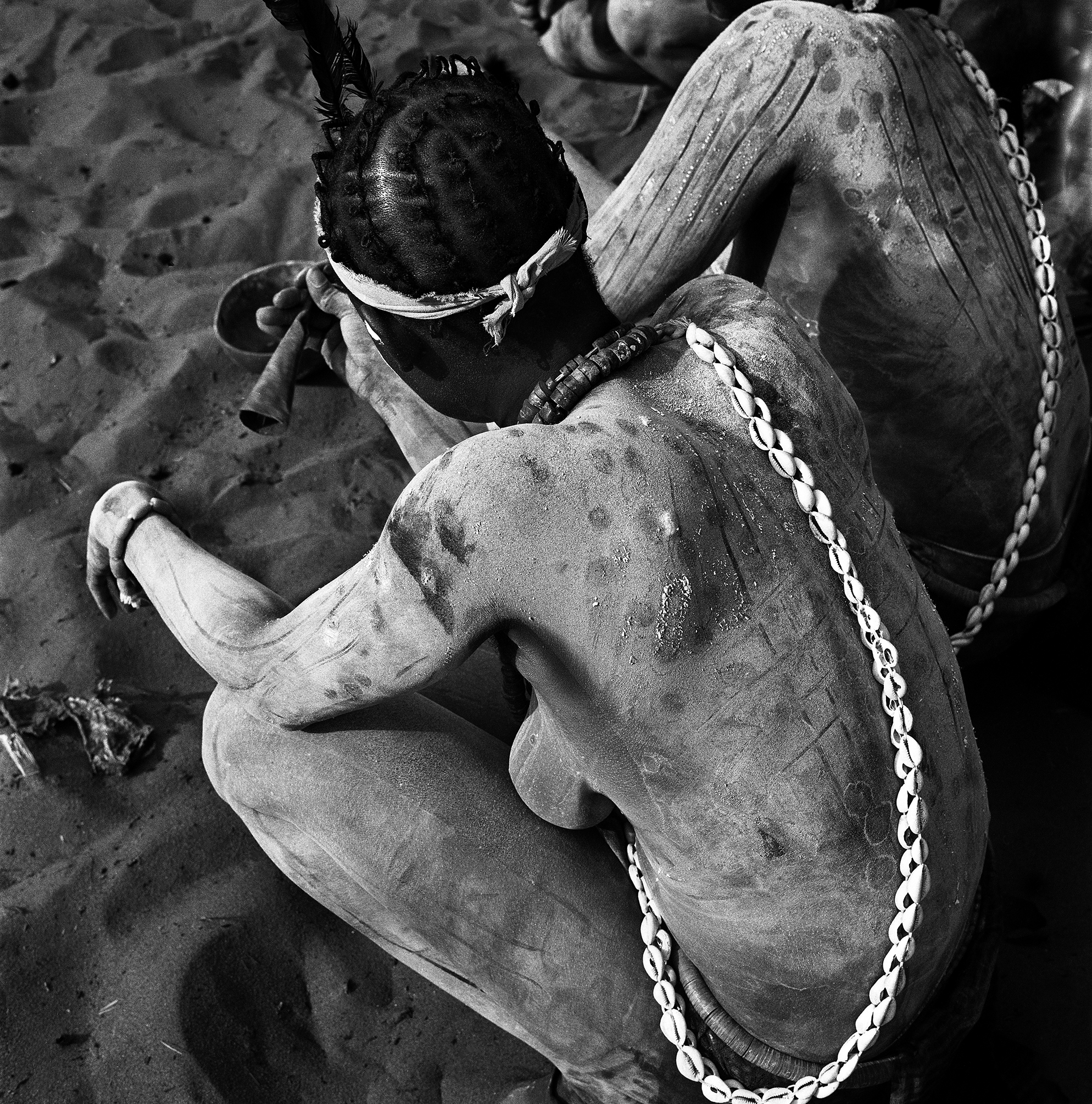
Voodoo West Africa 1978

=== International activities ===
In 1984, an exhibition curated by Fred Jahn was opened in the Munich Stadtmuseum, whose objects came from the Gert Chesi collection. In the same year the catalog Kunst der Zauberer appeared.

=== Cultural mediator ===
Chesi is guided by the vision to build bridges between cultures.

In 1984 he became a lecturer at the University of Innsbruck and taught photography at the Institute of Interior Design for ten years.

In 1986 and in the following years various photo exhibitions took place in several international galleries and museums. A catalog was published for his exhibition at Museum der Begegnung, Schmieding.

Another year later, he exhibited at the burgenländischen Landesausstellung . A color catalog for the exhibition "Theater der Übertreibungen" was published. At the same time, Chesi published in various journals and went on further study trips to India, Ladakh, Africa and Brazil.

In 1988, the Museum der Weltkulturen, Frankfurt acquired Chesi's Ethno Photo Archive consisting of 20,000 images dating back to 1973.

1991 Expansion of the Africa collection. In 1992, Gert Chesi collaborated with the Völkerkundemuseum Rotterdam, in 1993 several exhibitions of ethnological objects took place in numerous museums and galleries.

'Views of humankind in other worlds'/'Menschenbilder aus anderen Welten'

In 2013 the book Views of humankind in other worlds (German: Menschenbilder aus anderen Welten) was published. This series of photographs has been published as an exhibition project in 45 large-format photographs (85 × 125 cm) and is accompanied by an illustrated book with explanatory texts depicting the project and the people who modeled it.

'Western Voodoo'

In 2018, Chesi shows a series of photographs entitled "Western Voodoo" in France, Togo and Spain. The exhibition "Western Voodoo" presents the photographic work from Chesi's latest work, Views of humankind in other worlds (German: Menschenbilder aus anderen Welten). All the photos on display are inspired by the world of Voodoo, including paintings and body decorations. "Western Voodoo" brings together its creative European and African inspiration around a form of aesthetic "label", which shows how much we can learn from African ancestral traditions>.

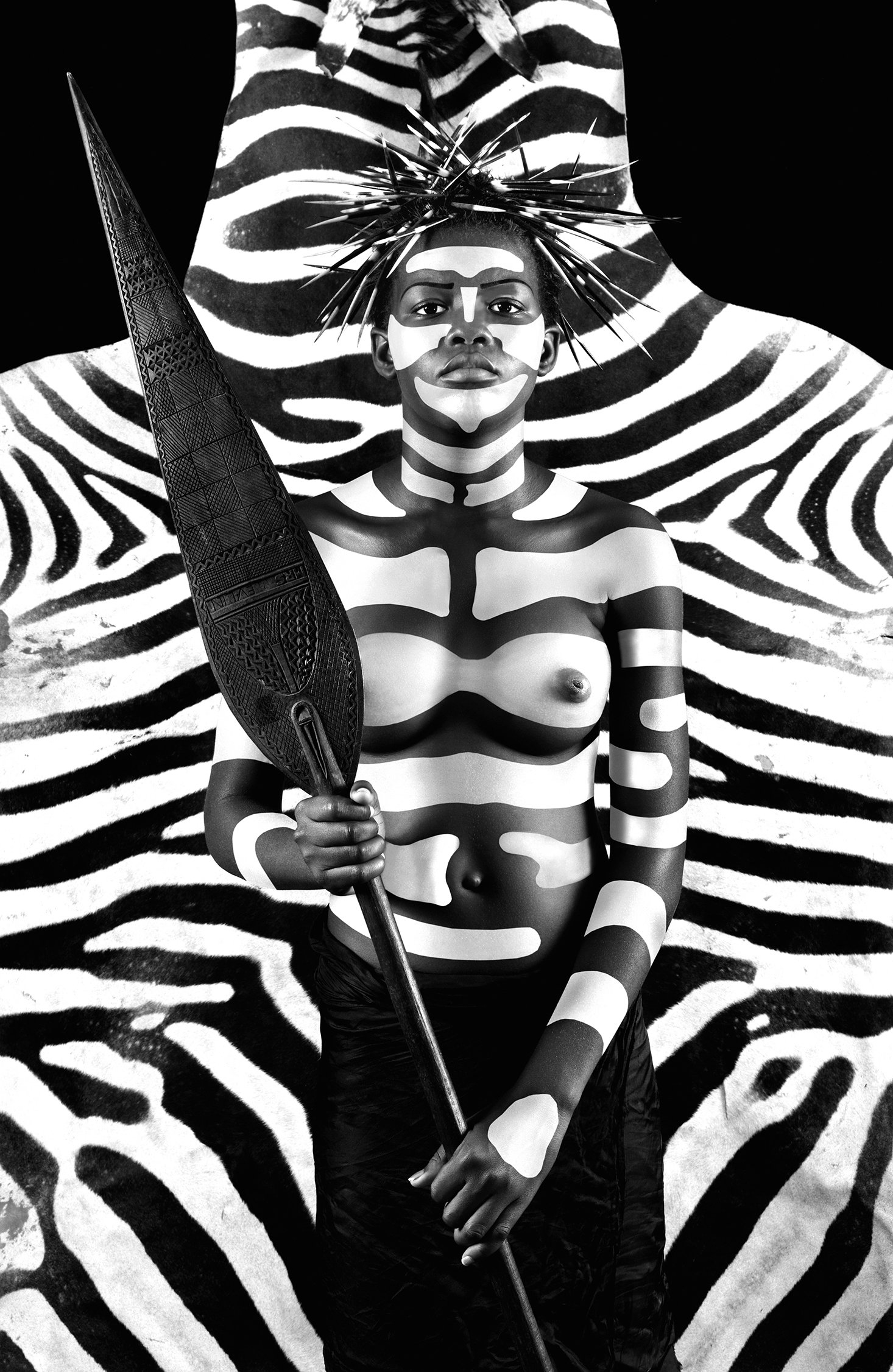
Views of humankind in other worlds Africa

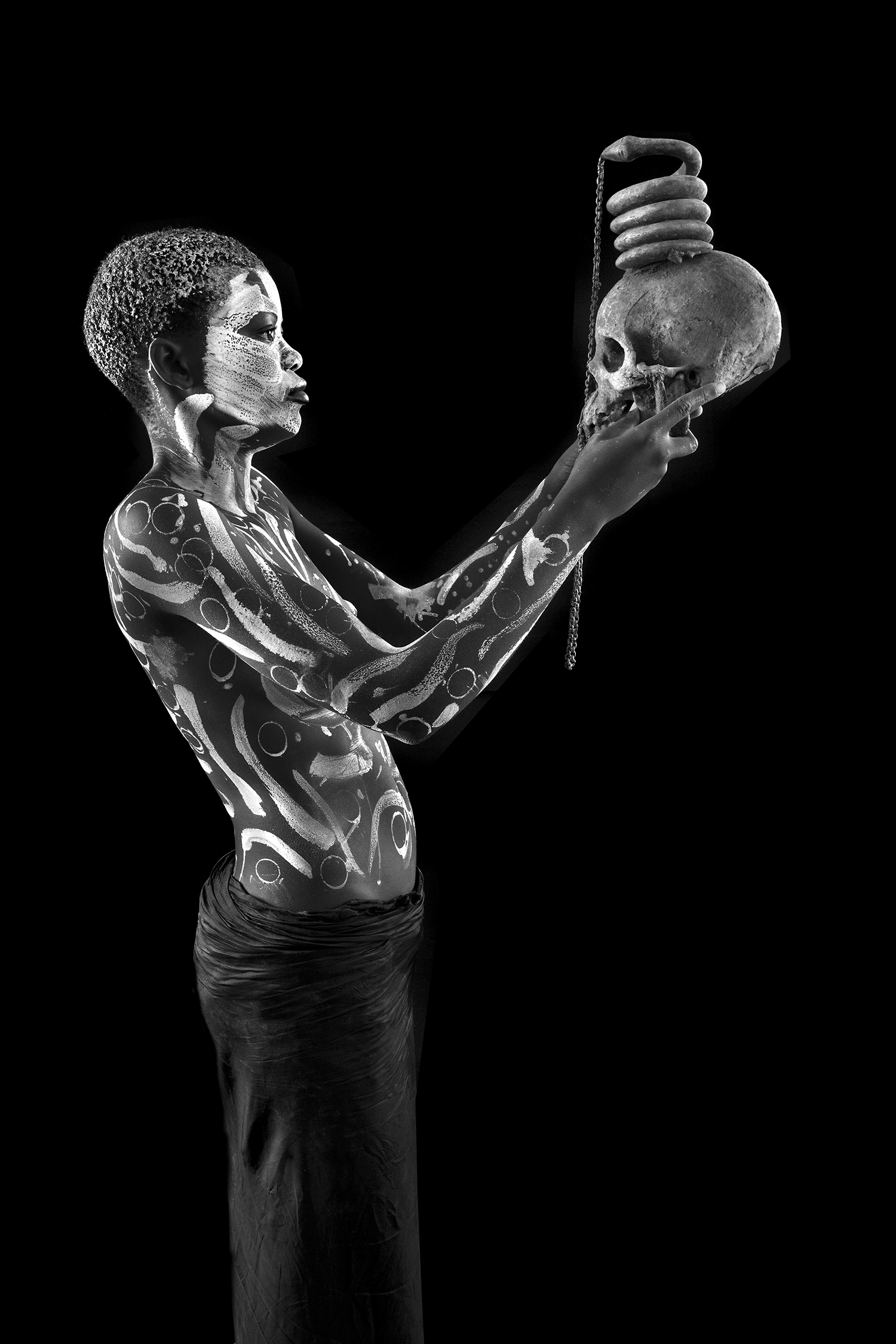
Views of humankind in other worlds Africa

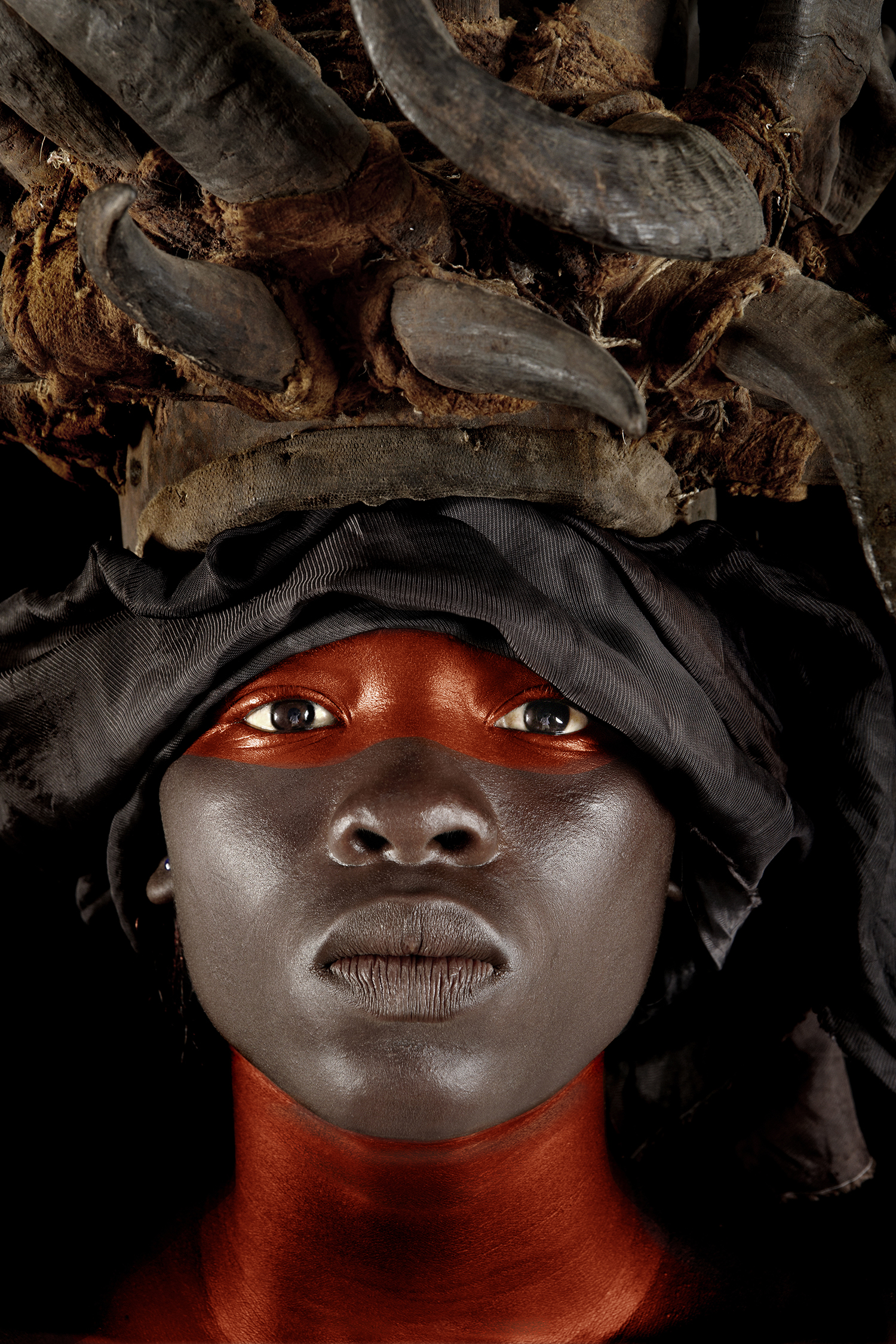
Views of humankind in other worlds Africa

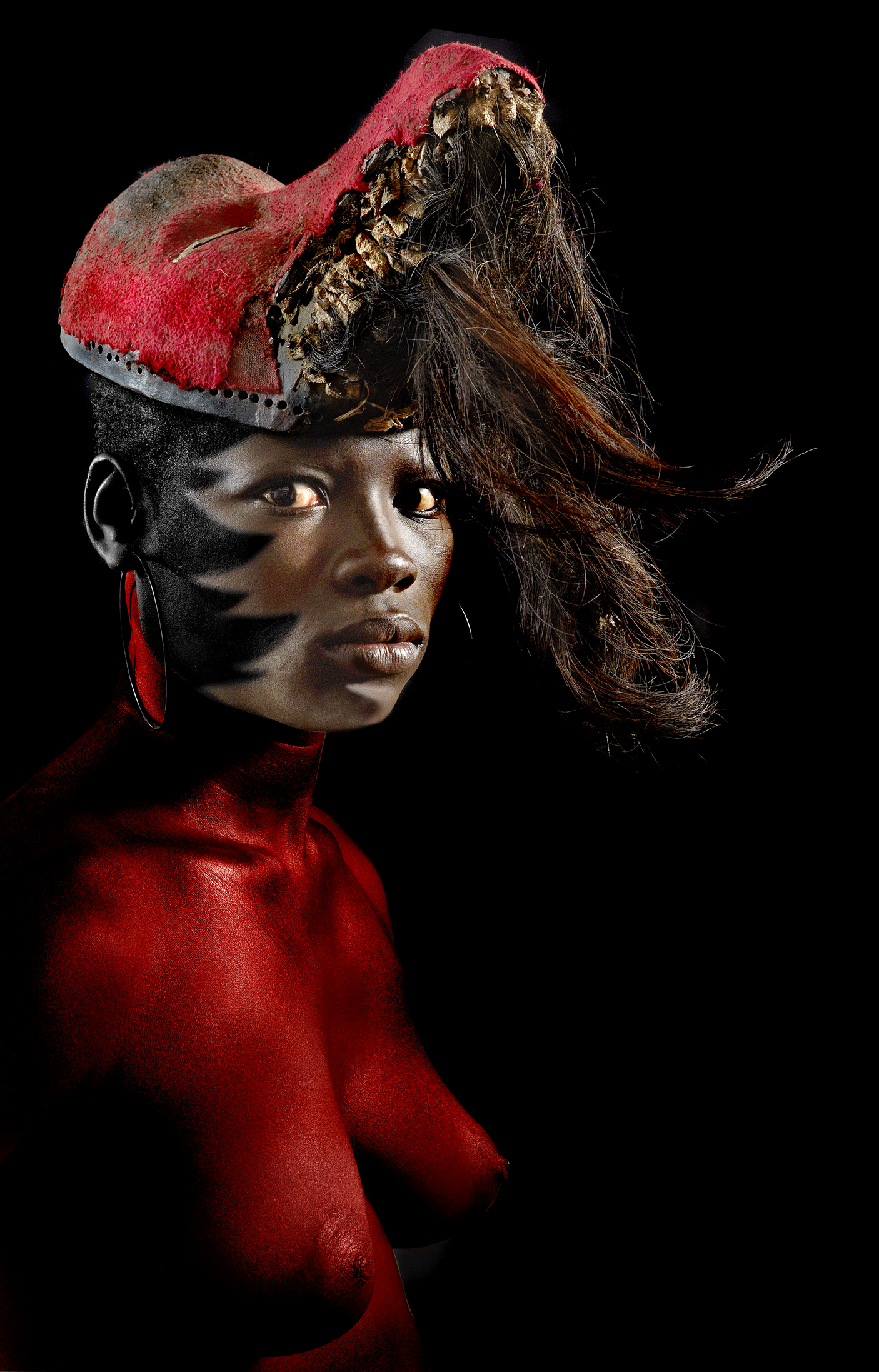
MViews of humankind in other worlds Africa

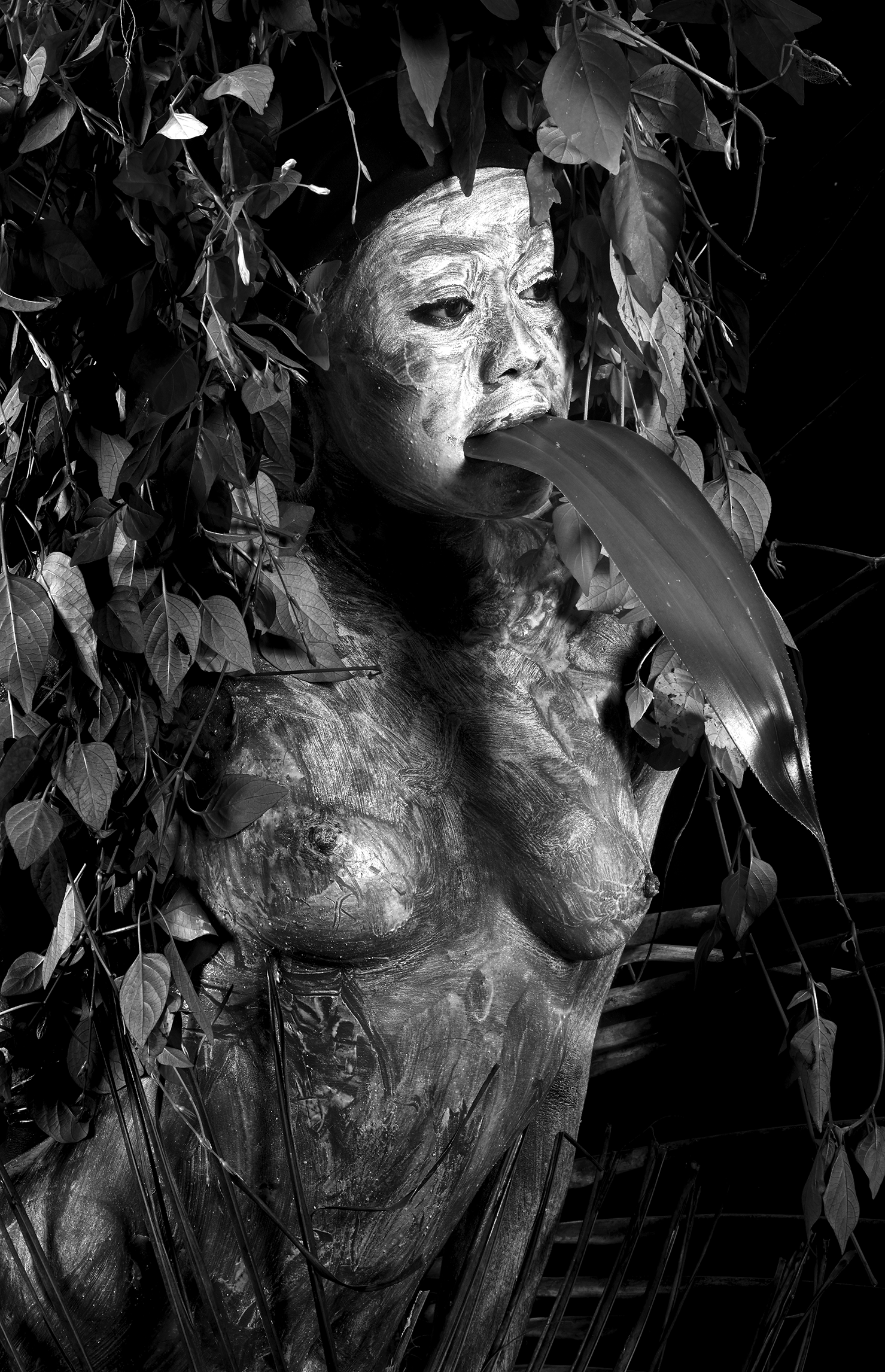
Western Voodoo

'Kind und Ritual' - cooperation with ubuntu - SOS Children's Villages

2013 Exhibition and catalog showing children in context with spiritual rites

=== Haus der Völker/Museum der Völker ===
The motivation of his work as a collector and discoverer was the desire to make the cultures of the world known, to treat their achievements with respect, to promote the free spirit and to reach as many people as possible.

In 1994, preparatory work on the Haus der Völker began in Schwaz, which opened in 1995. Chesi chose as location the premises of the meanwhile abandoned Tyrolean country girls' education center St. Martin in Schwaz, whose abuses he once discovered and documented. In an environment where the will of young girls was once broken, in 1995 Chesi opened the Haus der Völker, which stood for tolerance and international understanding.

At the same time, the book Architecture and Myth (German: Architektur und Mythos). For the universe series the ORF produced an Africa movie with Chesi. In 1995 his son was born.

Exhibition Concept

Chesi deliberately chose an opulent selection of works in his exhibition concept in order to convey a holistic understanding of culture. He wanted to illustrate the immeasurable wealth that humanity has produced. The exhibit covered a period of 4,000 years and included African masks and statues, such as Asian bronzes and terracottas. The collection intended to open the eyes of the observer to the achievements of the peoples of the world.

As the founder, director and owner of the Haus der Völker museum, Chesi presented his collection as a permanent exhibition in the following years and supplemented it with numerous special exhibitions in collaboration with international museums and collectors. Outside of his own business, Chesi also curated eight other exhibitions, including the Ethnological Museum Hamburg. In 1996, Gert Chesi founded the Kulturverein - Museum der Völker, which was under his leadership until 2016.

Under the direction of Gert Chesi, the Museum der Völker developed into an internationally renowned Ethnographic Museum, which initially housed the collection of a single collector as a permanent exhibition. Later this was supplemented by loans from the Schell Collection and the Lindner collection. The museum displayed objects from Africa and Asia that photographer and journalist Gert Chesi has collected for over 50 years. More than 50 special exhibitions illuminated the cultures from America to Japan.

Awards

In 1999, the museum received the Tyrolean Museum Prize and the Recognition Award as part of the Austrian Museum Prize.

In 2013, the museum received an extension building financed by the state of Tyrol.

In 2014, the Museum got the Austrian Museum Quality Seal by ICOM Austria.

Philanthropy

In 2016, after 23 years, Gert Chesi retired as museum director. He donated his valuable collection to the city of Schwaz under the condition of some framework conditions, with the aim of continuing the Museum der völker and the preservation of his collection in his spirit. The collection, which the 77-year-old ethnology specialist has collected all his life, consists of about 1400 objects and a library. The value is estimated at two million euros. He continued to work as a consultant and curator for the museum focusing on producing documentary films.

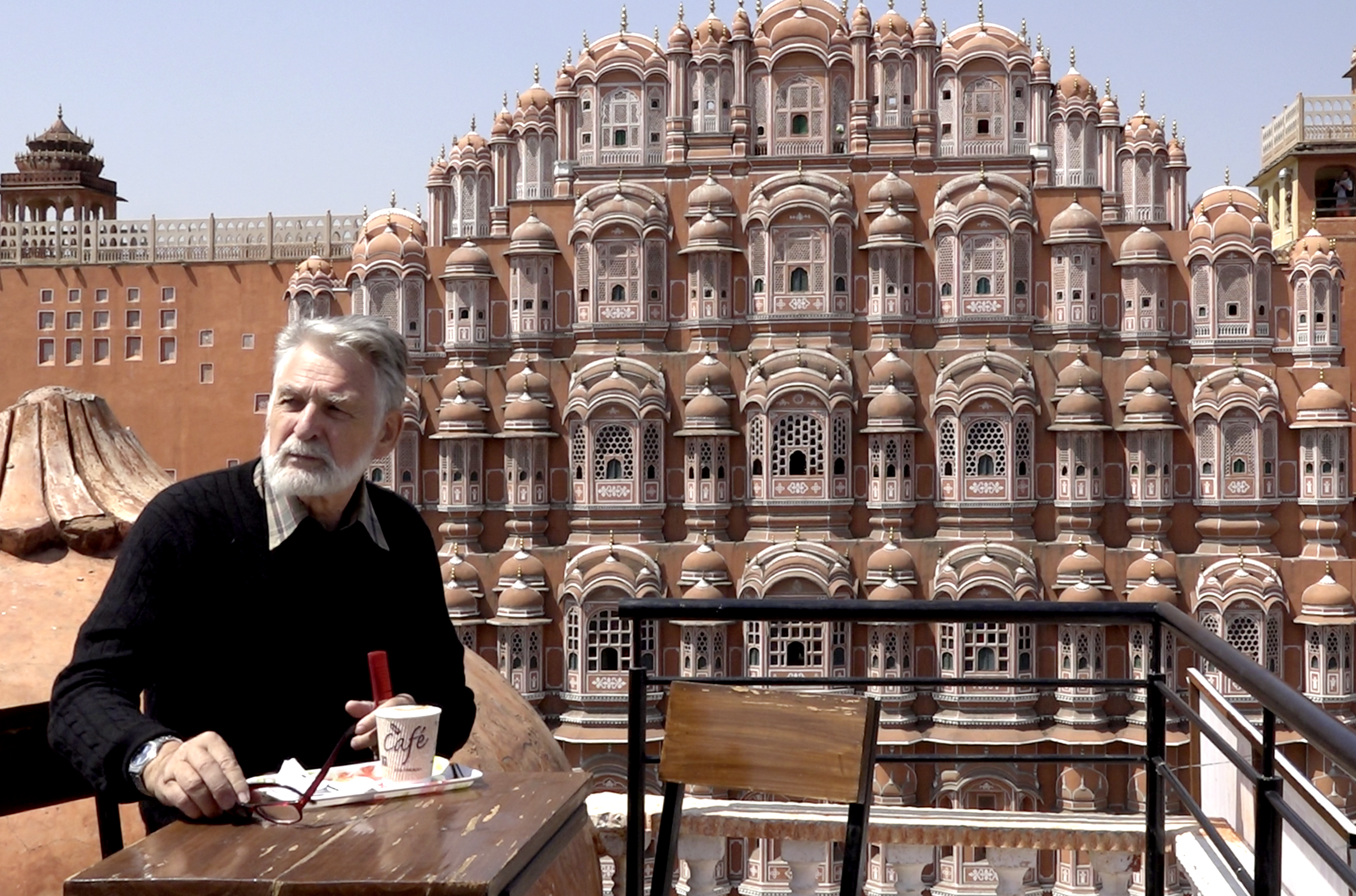
Gert Chesi in Jaipur 2016

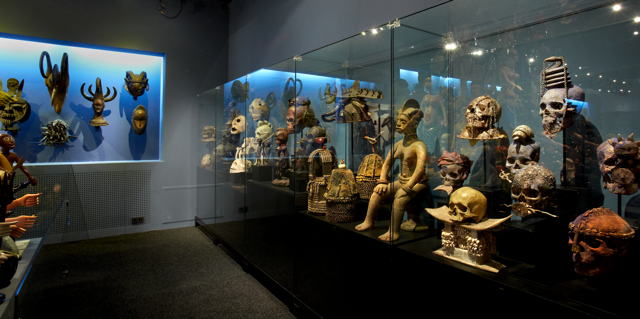
Afrika Section

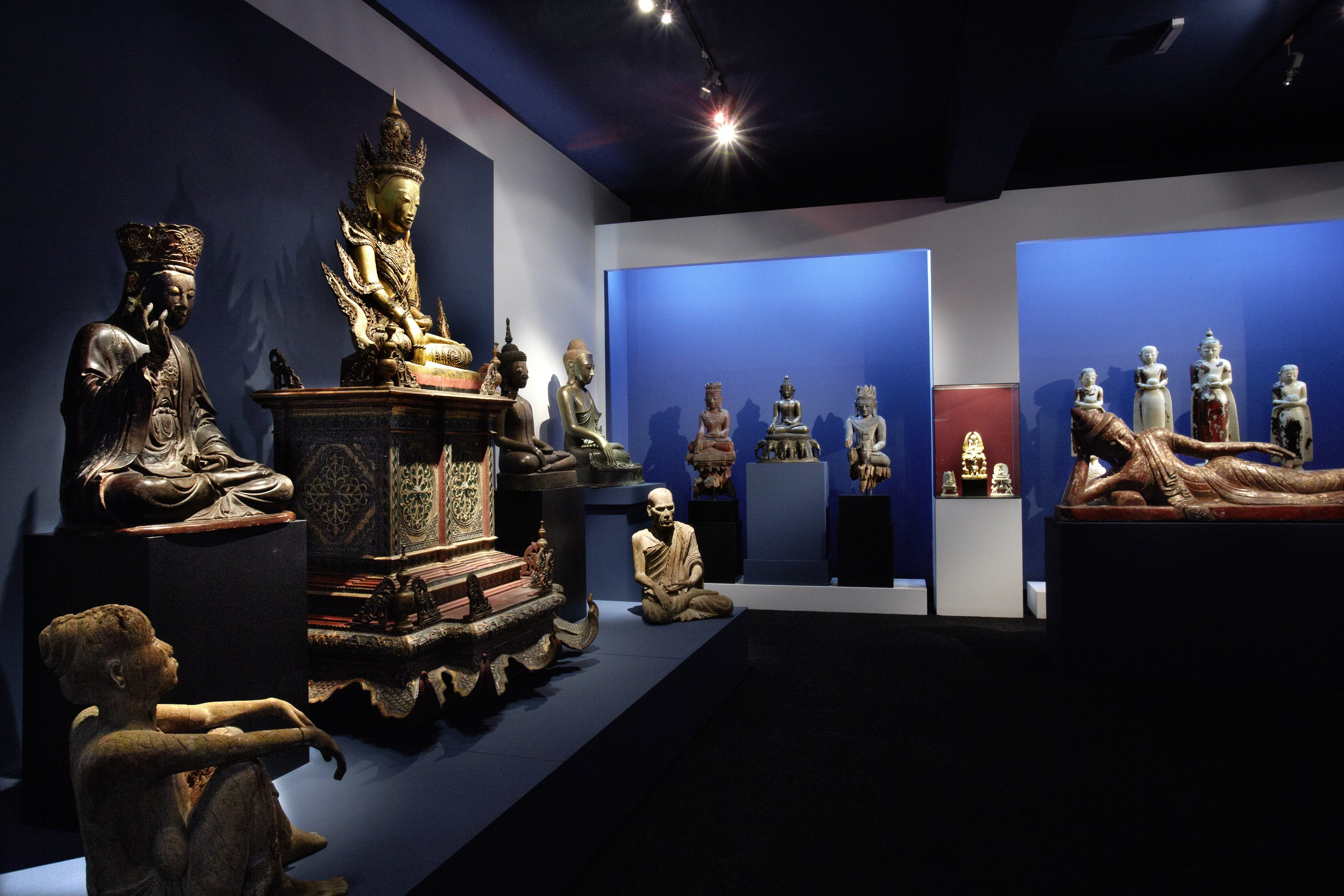
Asia Section

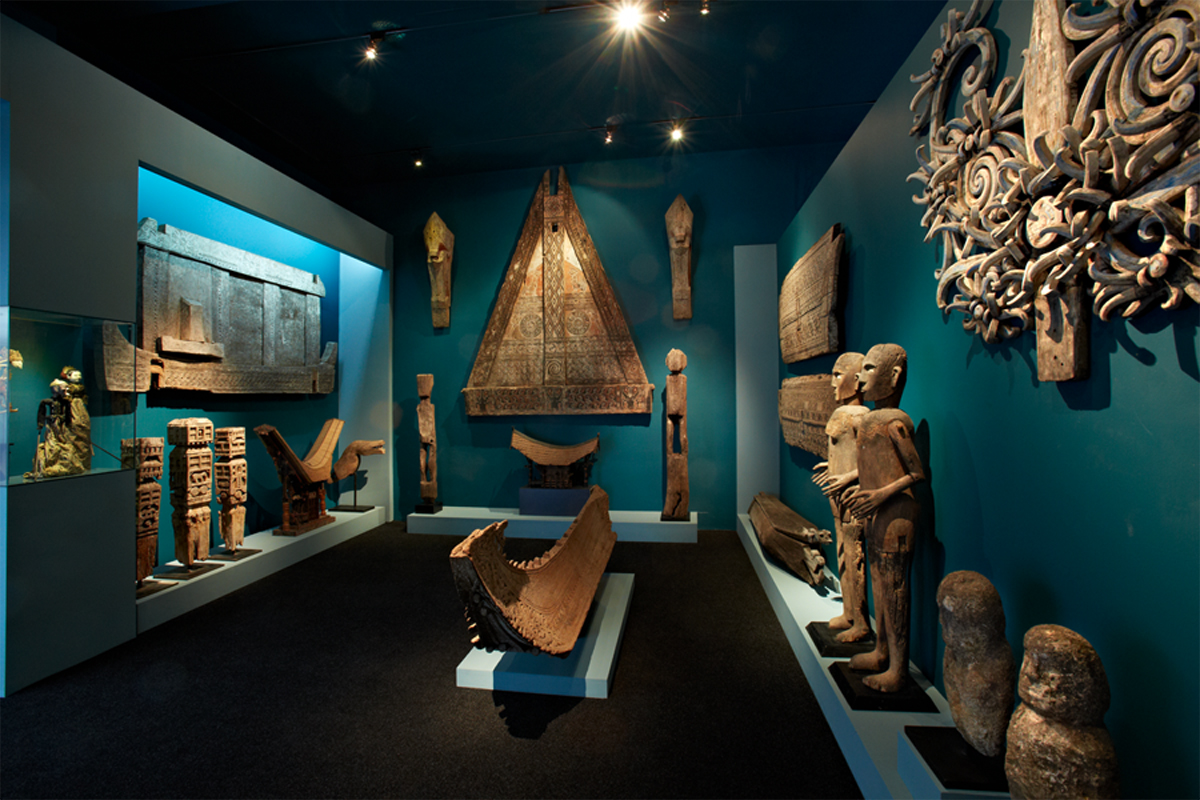
Indonesien Section

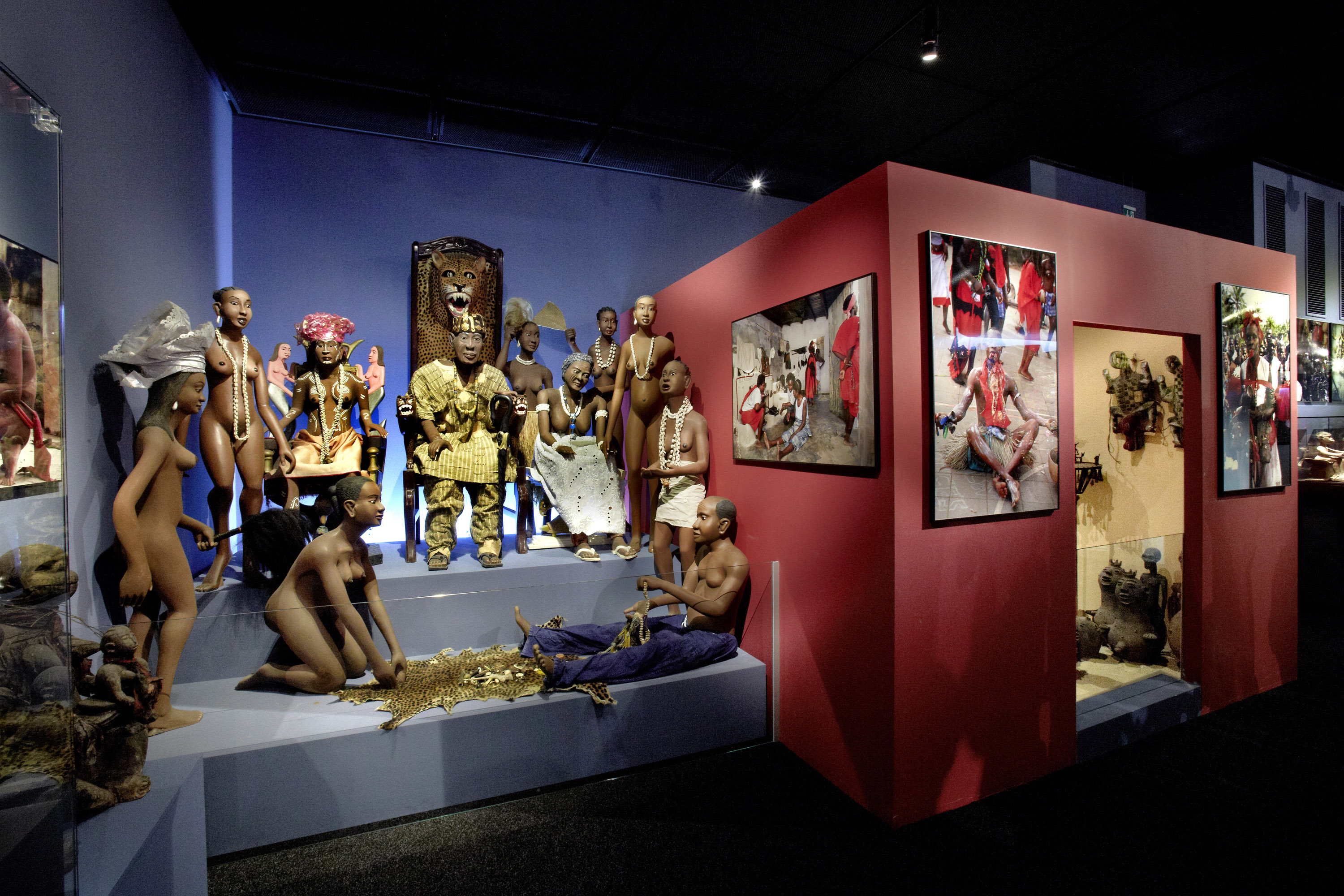
Voodoo Section

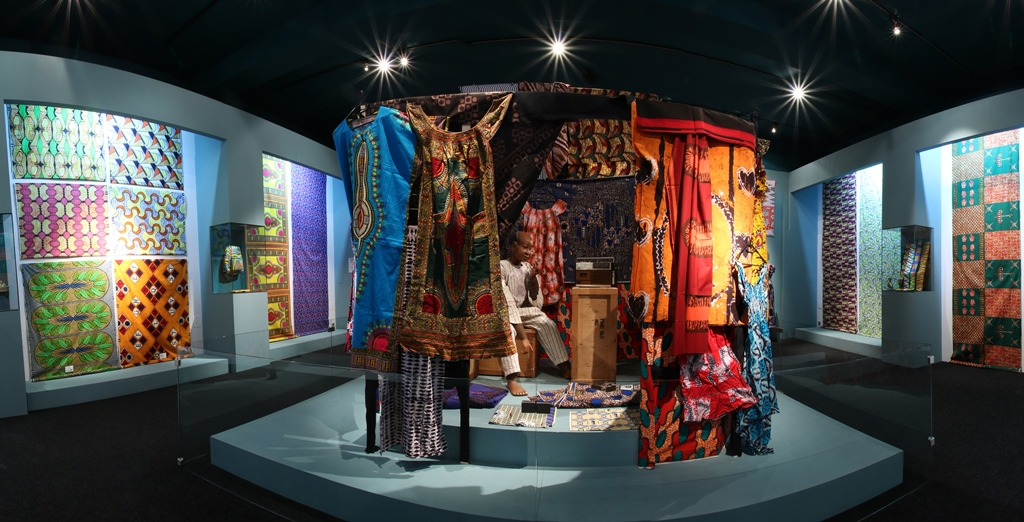
Exhibition African Textiles

Museum today

In 2017, a new management took over the chairmanship of the Kulturvereins Museum der Völker.

In 2018, since basic donation-related conditions were not met and Gert Chesi was excluded by the new leadership, he withdrew completely from the museum.

=== Foundation of A4 Magazin ===
In 2005 with Gerhard Merzeder, Chesi founded the first German-language magazine for non-European art, the A4 Magazin, which appears twice a year for ten years. The publishing house Haus der Völker, which belongs to the museum, is the publisher of the first German-language magazine dealing with non-European art and culture. The title of the magazine A4 refers to the four continents, Australia, Asia, Africa and America. Editors-in-chief are Gerhard Merzeder and Gert Chesi.

== Celebrations of Chesi's 80th birthday ==
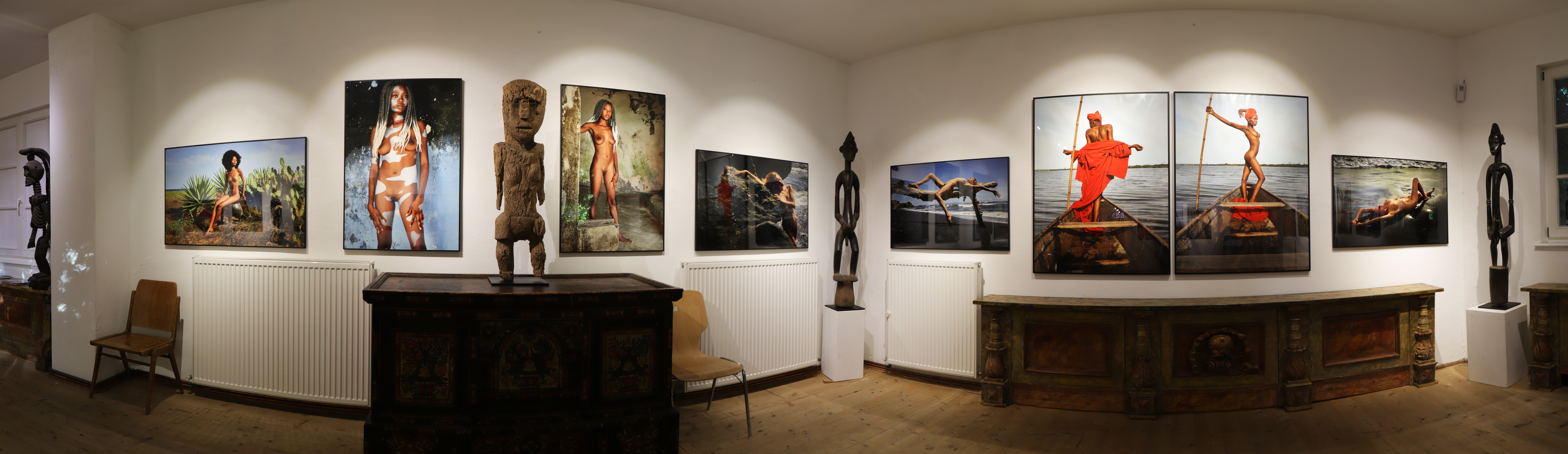
Photo exhibition on the occasion of Gert Chesi's 80th birthday in the Toni-Knapp House in Schwaz

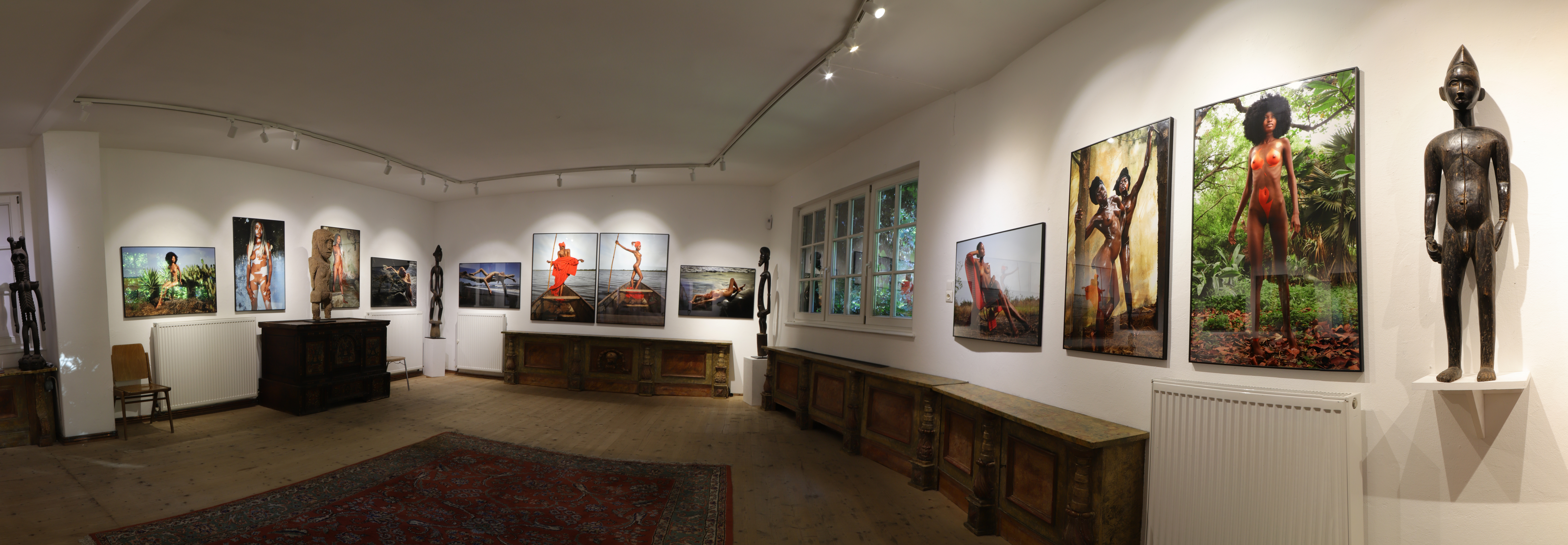
Photo exhibition on the occasion of Gert Chesi's 80th birthday in the Toni-Knapp House in Schwaz

On the occasion of Gert Chesi's 80th birthday, three events are taking place in his home town of Schwaz.

- Photo exhibition with nude photography in the Toni-Knapp House: August 22 to September 5, 2020
- Book presentation "Neue Menschenbilder" in the Schwazer Stadtbücherei
- 25 years of the Museum der Völker and 80 years of Gert Chesi in the Museum der Völker

On September 4, 2020, Gert Chesi presented his film Africa, Old Cults, New Perspectives to the public in VZ Jenbach.

== Companions from the art scene ==
In the course of his life Gert Chesi worked with international well known artists. He used the opportunity to portray some of them. These pictures went around the world.

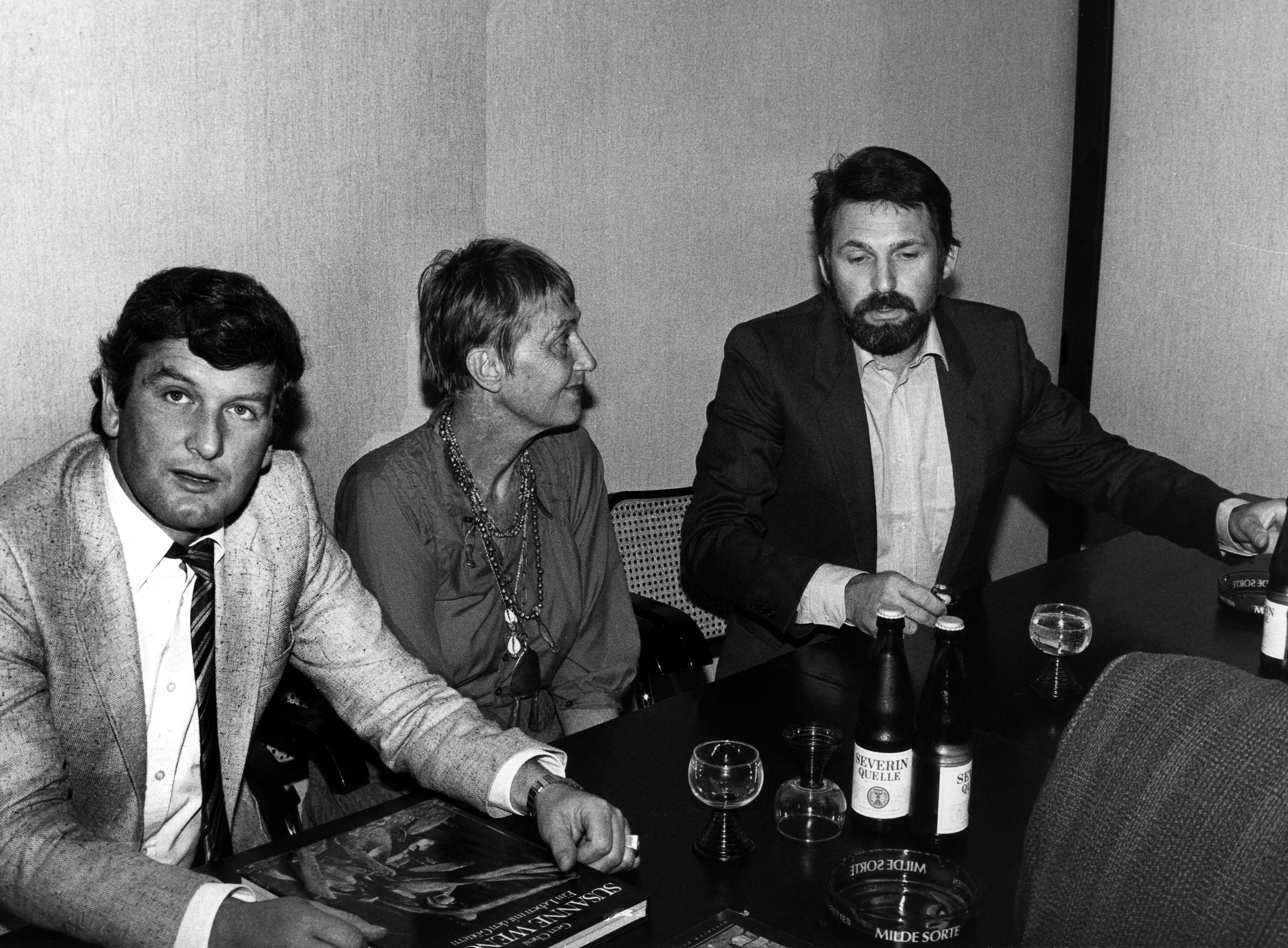
Engelbert Perlinger with Susanne Wenger and Gert Chesi in Wörgl

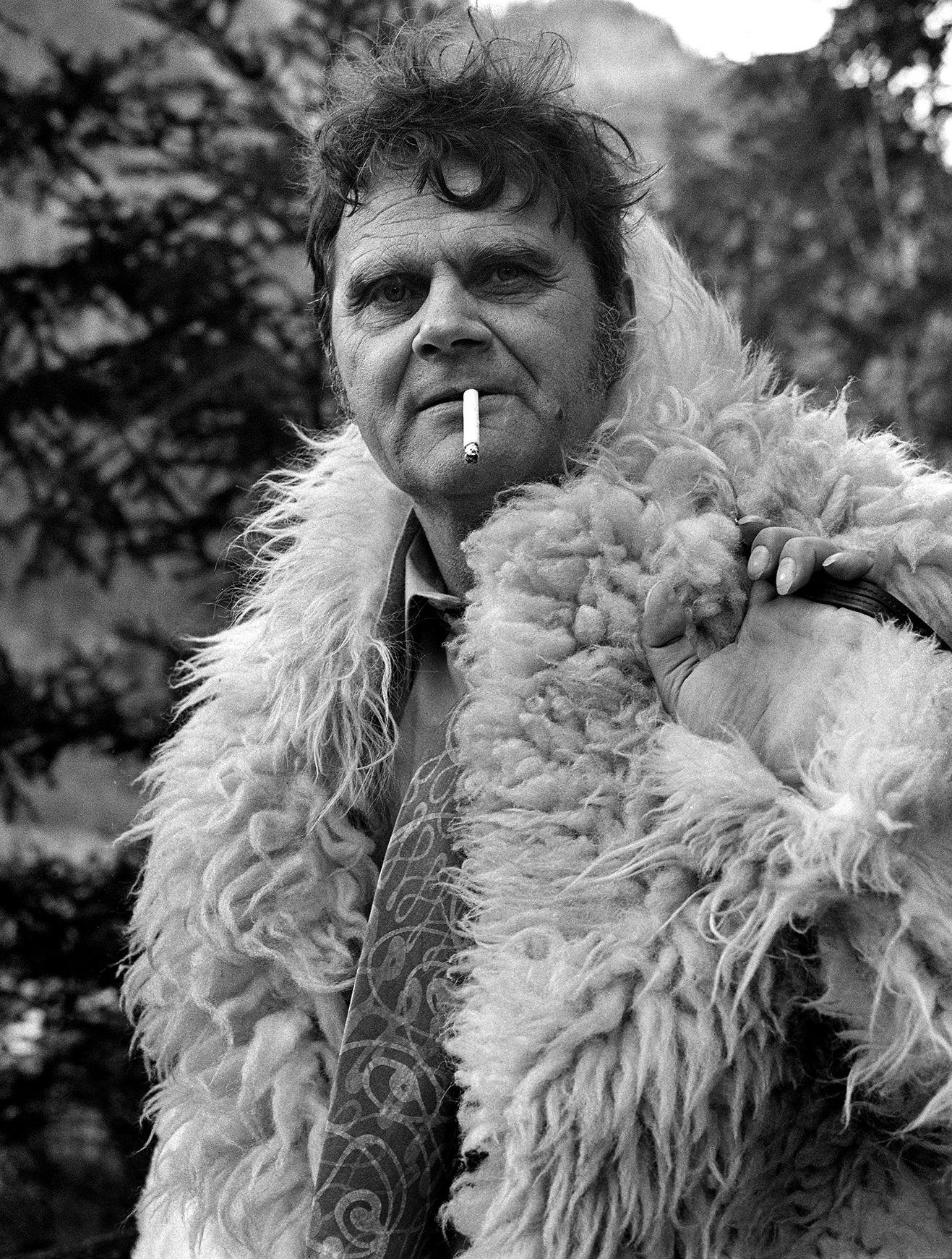
H.C. Artmann at Vomper Loch, Austria

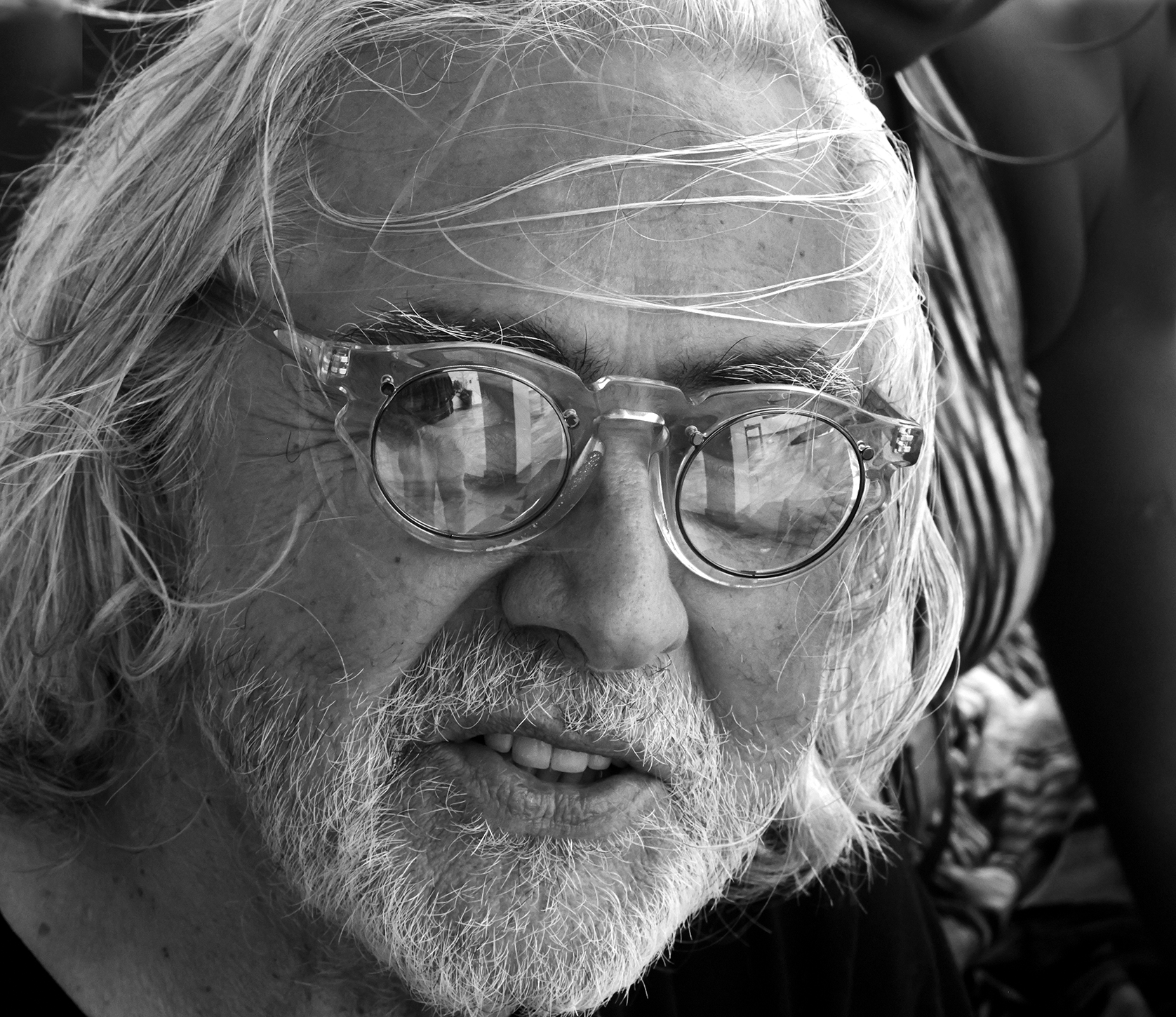
Reinhard Diezl in Benin, Africa

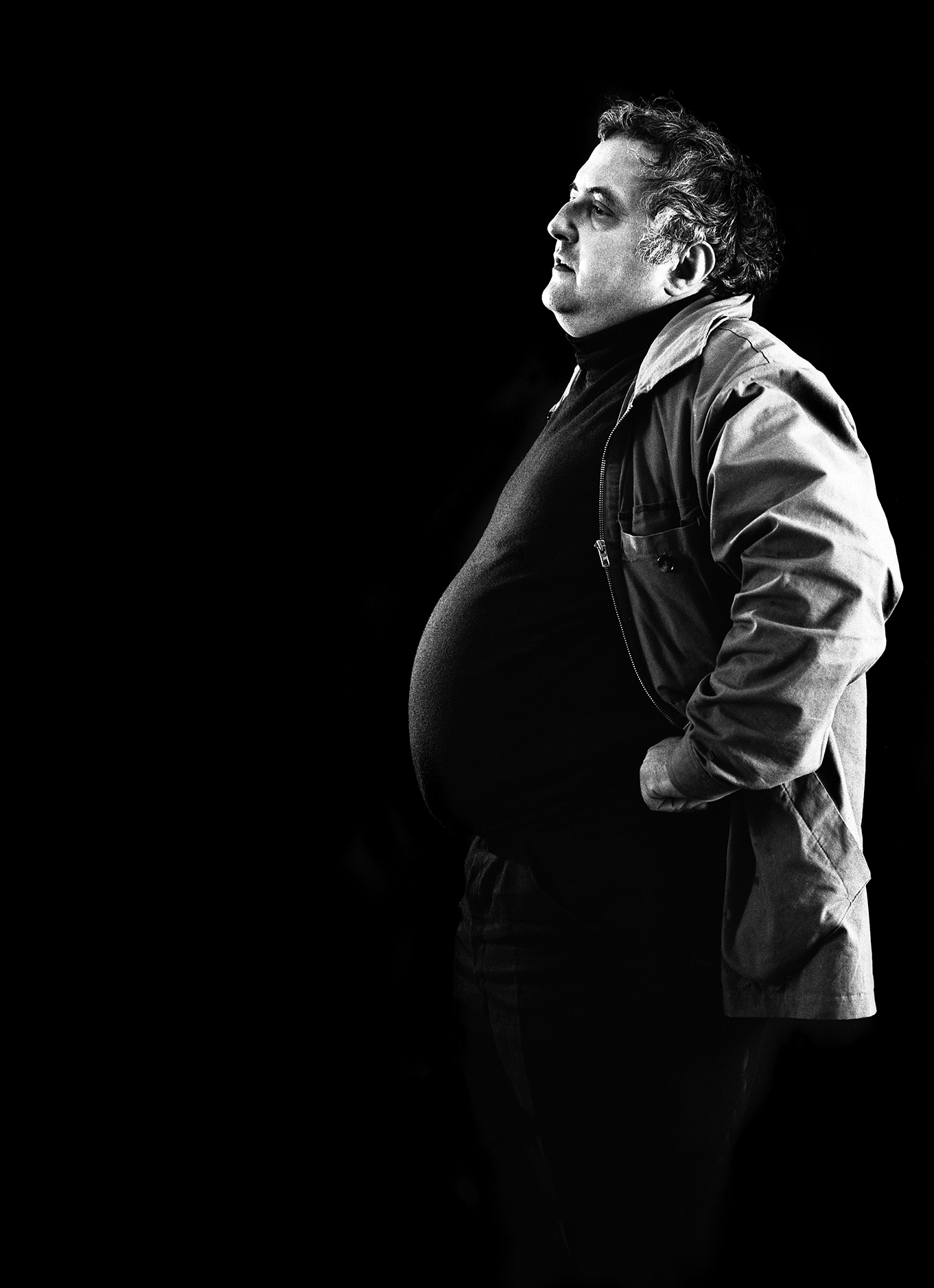
Bert Breit in Schwaz, Austria

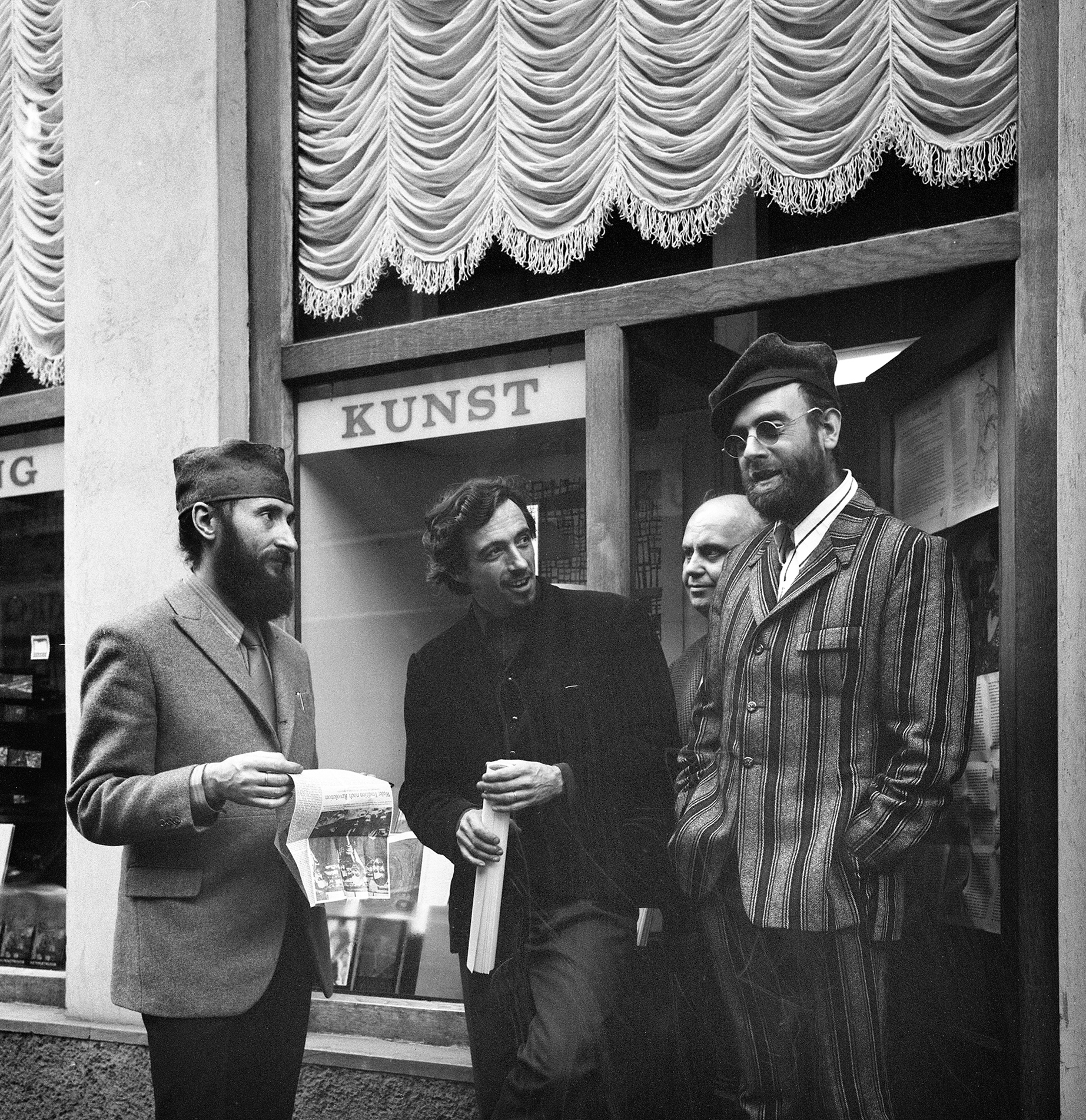
Ernst Fuchs with Arik Brauer and Friedensreich Hundertwasser in Vienna, Austria

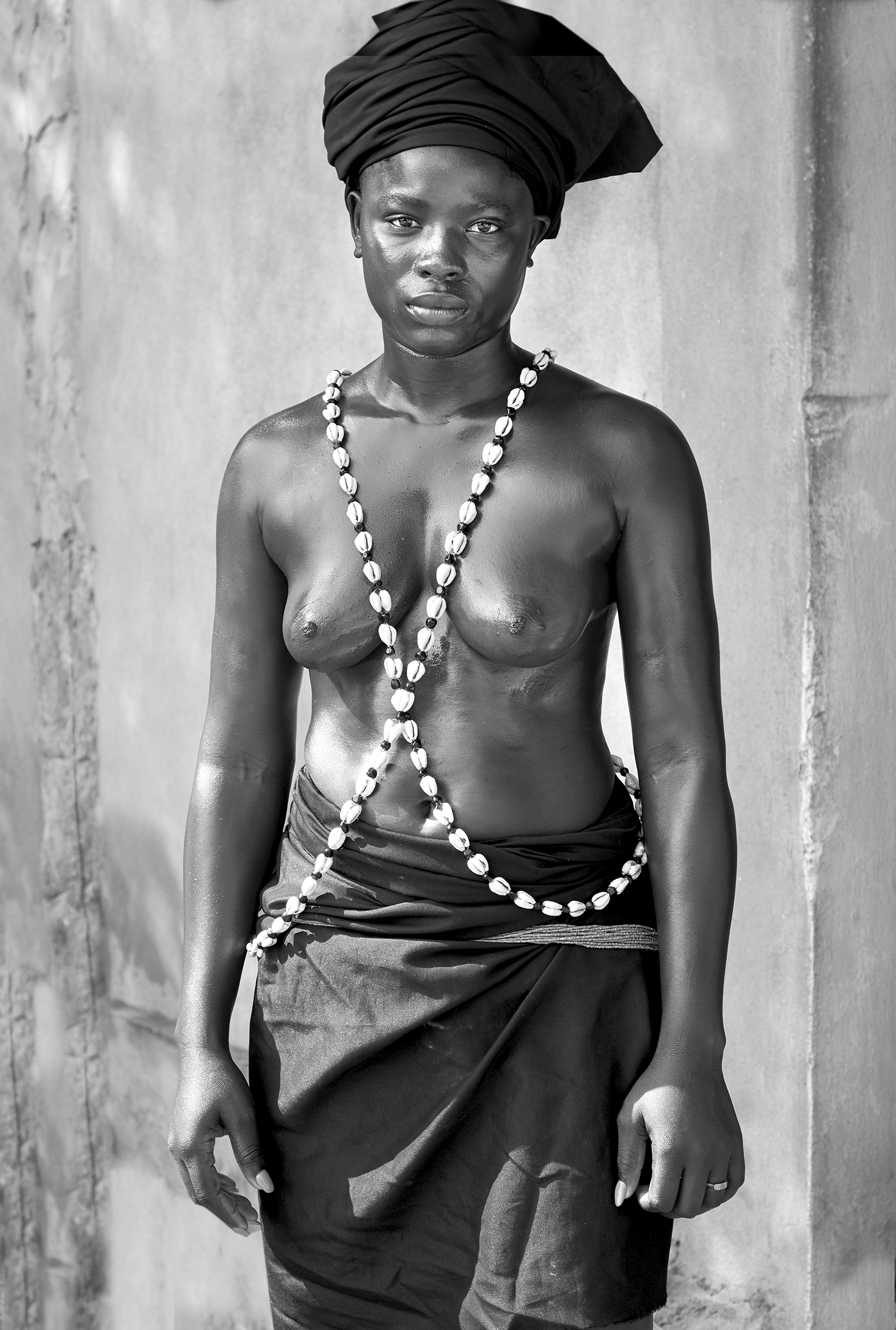
Ahoefa Kunakey, partner of Gert Chesi in Lomé, Togo

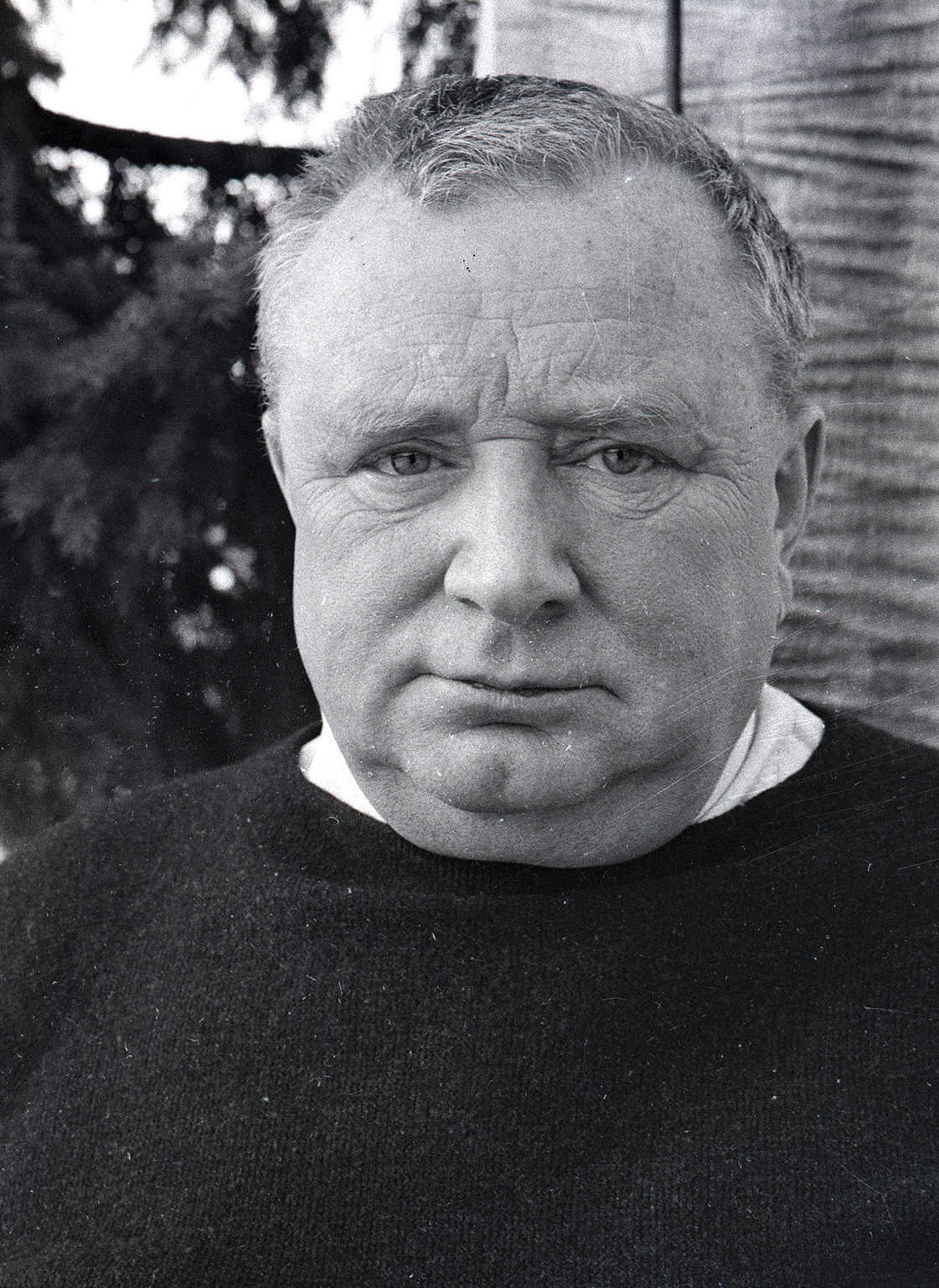
Paul Dierkes in Weerberg, Austria

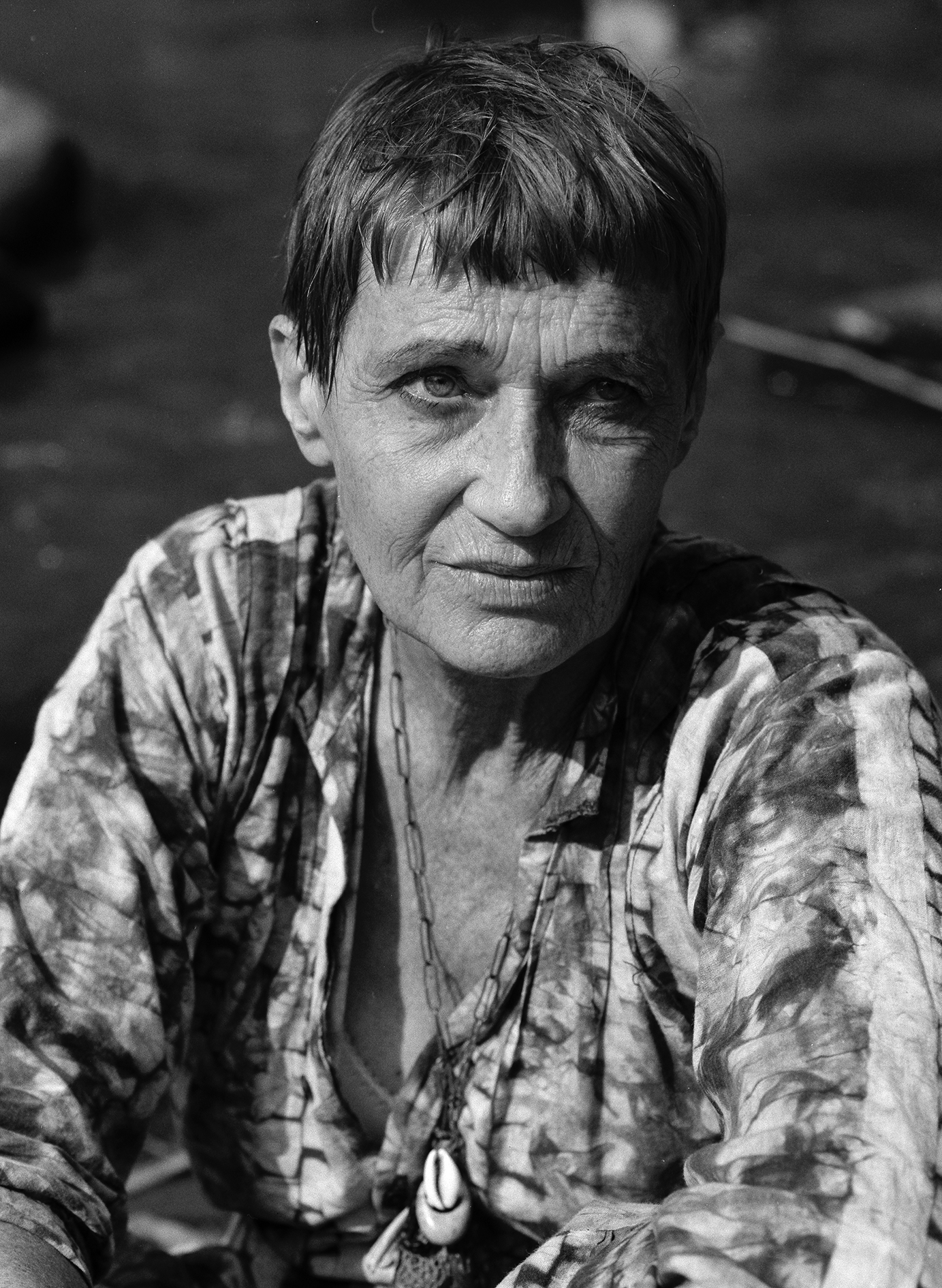
Susanne Wenger in Oshogbo, Nigeria

=== Publications ===
Gert Chesi prepared another book called Trance and Possession Cults in West-Africa (German: Trance und Besessenheitskulte in Westafrika).

In 1998 his first CD of the series "The Sound of Africa" (The Sound of Voodoo) was produced. The "Haus der Völker" took part in the exhibition "Cults, Artists, Kings" (German: "Kulte, Künstler, Könige") in the Castle Museum Linz and in the exhibition "Power of Women and Domination of Men" (German: "Frauenmacht und Männerherrschaft") in the Rautenstrauch-Joest Museum in Cologne. On behalf of the German-Chinese Society he traveled to China and Asia on several occasions to select exhibits for the exhibition "2000 Years of Silk Road" in collaboration with Mrs. Prof. Dr. M.Yaldiz, Director of the Museum of Asian Art Berlin - Dahlem. In 1999 he worked on the preliminary studies of the book Voodoo in Africa. Chesi traveled to West Africa to prepare the exhibition "2000 Years of African Ceramic" (German: "2000 Jahre afrikanische Keramik"). On behalf of the city Schwaz, he organized two exhibitions with the title "The Spirit of Silver" on the occasion of the 100 year festival of becoming a city.

After a severe heart surgery in 2000, Chesi traveled to Africa and Asia on several occasions. After an extensive trip to China the preparations of the exhibition "Textile Art of Chinese Mountain Peoples" (German: "Textile Kunst chinesischer Bergvölker") were completed. The concept of "Buddha in Art and Myth" (German: "Buddha in Kunst und Mythos") was realized; the exhibition was opened in March. During the same year, Gert Chesi discovered a significant sculpture of the Nok and acquired it for the "House of the People". In collaboration with the Museum of Ethnology, Hamburg he opened a huge exhibition about Japan.

In 2002 his autobiographical book Africa in ones Heart (German: Afrika im Herzen) was published by Haymon. One year later his book Voodoo in Africa was published by Haymon, as well. In 2005 Gert Chesi moved his main-residence to Togo and assigned the operative part of "Haus der Völker" to a new newly founded cultural association. Within the same year, he published his first German Magazine of Non-European art in collaboration with Gerhard Merzeder: MAGAZIN A4 which is issued twice annually. In 2006 Merzeder and Chesi designed their first extensive photo book about the culture of the Nok. He produced two movies about Africa. During the years 2007 to 2010 he hosted several exhibitions in the "Haus der Völker" and published various catalogue essays. He further engaged in African traditions.

In 2010 the book Africa- Magicians of the Earth (German: Afrika – Die Magier der Erde) was published by Studienverlag. After extensive trips to Thailand, India and Africa, he published Views of humankind in other worlds (German: Menschenbilder aus anderen Welten). An exhibition series of these images started in January 2012 in Rabalderhaus in Schwaz. In February 2012 the photographs of Gert Chesis were displayed in the Institute Francaise in Togo.

== Documentary film ==
2013 Gert Chesi started to produce documentary films about tribal and religious traditions in Africa and Asia.

- Afrika im Wandel 2018.
- Indonesien Teil 1 - 4 2016 - 2018.
- Afrika - Menschen, Mythen, Traditionen 2018.
- Burma Teil 2 2018.
- Asien im Fest Teil 1 und 2 2016 - 17.
- Africa Connection 2015 - 2017.
- Togo en fete 2017.
- Die Farben Indiens Teil 2 2017.
- Das Leben ist ein Spiel 2017.
- Die Irre von Avepozo 2015 - 2016.
- Die Farben Indiens Teil 1 2016.
- Buddha in schlechter Gesellschaft 2016.
- Chinatown - Bangkok 2016.
- Das Voodoo Tagebuch 2015.
- Königsstädte Asiens - Laos/Vietnam/Kambodscha 2015.
- Buddhas unfolgsame Kinder - part 3 2015
- Königsstädte Asiens - Laos, Vietnam, Kambodscha 2015
- Die Medizin der schwarzen Götter - Magie und Heilkunst Afrikas Teil 2 2015
- Die Medizin der schwarzen Götter - Magie und Heilkunst Afrikas Teil 1 2015
- Äthiopien - Eine Zeitreise 2015
- Burma - Buddhas Erben 2015
- Tanzende Schatten - Puppentheater in Thailand 2015
- Buddhas Glanz und Elend 2015
- Das Lied der Strasse - part 2 2015
- Buddhas unfolgsame Kinder - part 2 2014
- Das Lied der Strasse - part 1 2014
- Alice Mettler - Mein Leben in Afrika 2014
- Leben und Tod auf Bali 2014
- Miao - Ein Volk im Wandel 2014
- Made in Africa 2014
- Buddhas unfolgsame Kinder Teil 1 2014
- Voodoo – Magier der Erde 2013
- Togo im Tanz 2013
- Maskenkulte in Kerala/Indien 2013
- Die Geschichte der Ning 2013

== Honors ==
- 1999: The "Haus der Völker" received the Museum Award of Tirol and the Recognition Award of the Austrian Federal Ministry for Arts and Culture (German: Bundesministerium für Kunst und Kultur).
- 2000: Gert Chesi medal of the city Schwaz.
- 2001: Gert Chesi was awarded the professional title "professor".
- 2014: ICOM Austria, Österreichisches Museumsgütesiegel

== Writings by Gert Chesi ==
- Menschenbilder aus anderen Welten, 2011 ISBN 978-3200024403
- Afrika. Die Magier der Erde, 2010 ISBN 978-3706549837
- The Nok Culture: Art in Nigeria 2500 Years Ago 2007, ISBN 978-3791336466
- Afrika im Herzen. Erinnerungen, Reflexionen, Fotografien, 2003 ISBN 978-3852184036
- Architektur und Mythos. Lehmbauten in Afrika, 1997 ISBN 978-3852182407
- Die Medizin der schwarzen Götter - Magie und Heilkunst Afrikas, 1997 ISBN 978-3852182582
- Vaudou/force secrete de l'afrique (Vieux Fonds Vln), 1994 ISBN 978-2700303216
- Voodoo: Africa's Secret Power 1985, ISBN 978-3853990131
- Faith Healers in the Philippines 1984 ISBN 978-3853990254
- Colon. Das schwarze Bild vom weißen Mann. Eine Ausstellung im Münchner Stadtmuseum, 1983 ISBN 978-3853990131
- Susanne Wenger, 1983 ISBN 978-3853990049
- A Life with the Gods in their Yoruba Homeland, 1983 ISBN 978-3853990155
- Geistheiler auf den Philippinen, 1981 ISBN 978-3853990247
- A Life with the Gods in Their Yoruba Homeland 1980 ISBN 978-3853990155
- Les Derniers Africains, 1978
- Last Africans 1977, ISBN 978-3853990025
