= Chesi =

Chesi (Italian pronunciation: [ˈkɛːzi]) is an Italian surname. Notable people with the surname include:

- Gert Chesi (born 1940), Austrian photographer, author, journalist and filmmaker
- Pietro Chesi (1902–1944), Italian cyclist
- Vittorio Chesi (1916–1991), Italian journalist
