= Schmiding Zoo =

Zoo in Austria

Zoo Schmiding und Aquazoo Schmiding
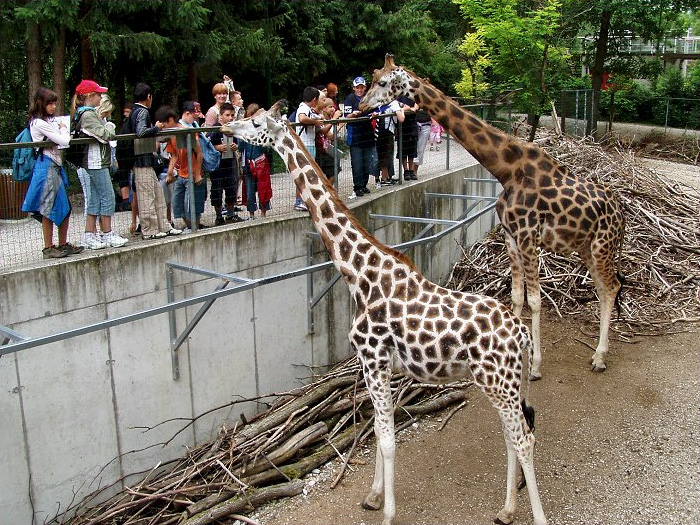
- Interactive map of Zoo Schmiding und Aquazoo Schmiding
- 48°11′40″N 13°57′23″E
- Date opened: end of 1960´s
- Location: Schmidingerstrasse 5, A- 4631 Krenglbach, Austria
- Land area: 13 hectares
- Memberships: WAZA, EAZA, OZO
- Owner: Realia Liegenschaftsservice GmbH
- Website: http://www.zooschmiding.at/

Schmiding Zoo is a zoo at Schloss Schmiding, a castle in Upper Austria, Austria.

The origin of the zoo is from Europe's largest bird park, Vogelpark Schmiding, which opened the gates in 1982, and the zoo displays the largest walk-through aviary in the world (25.000 m³).

The zoo also includes an aquarium, der Aquazoo, which is Austria's largest marine aquarium. In 2017 the Evolutionary Museum Schmiding opened next to the Aquazoo. It completes the evolutionary time travel which was started in the Aquarium, and shows how humans evolved during the course of time - first physically then spiritually and what the future might hold.
