= Krenglbach =

- Municipality
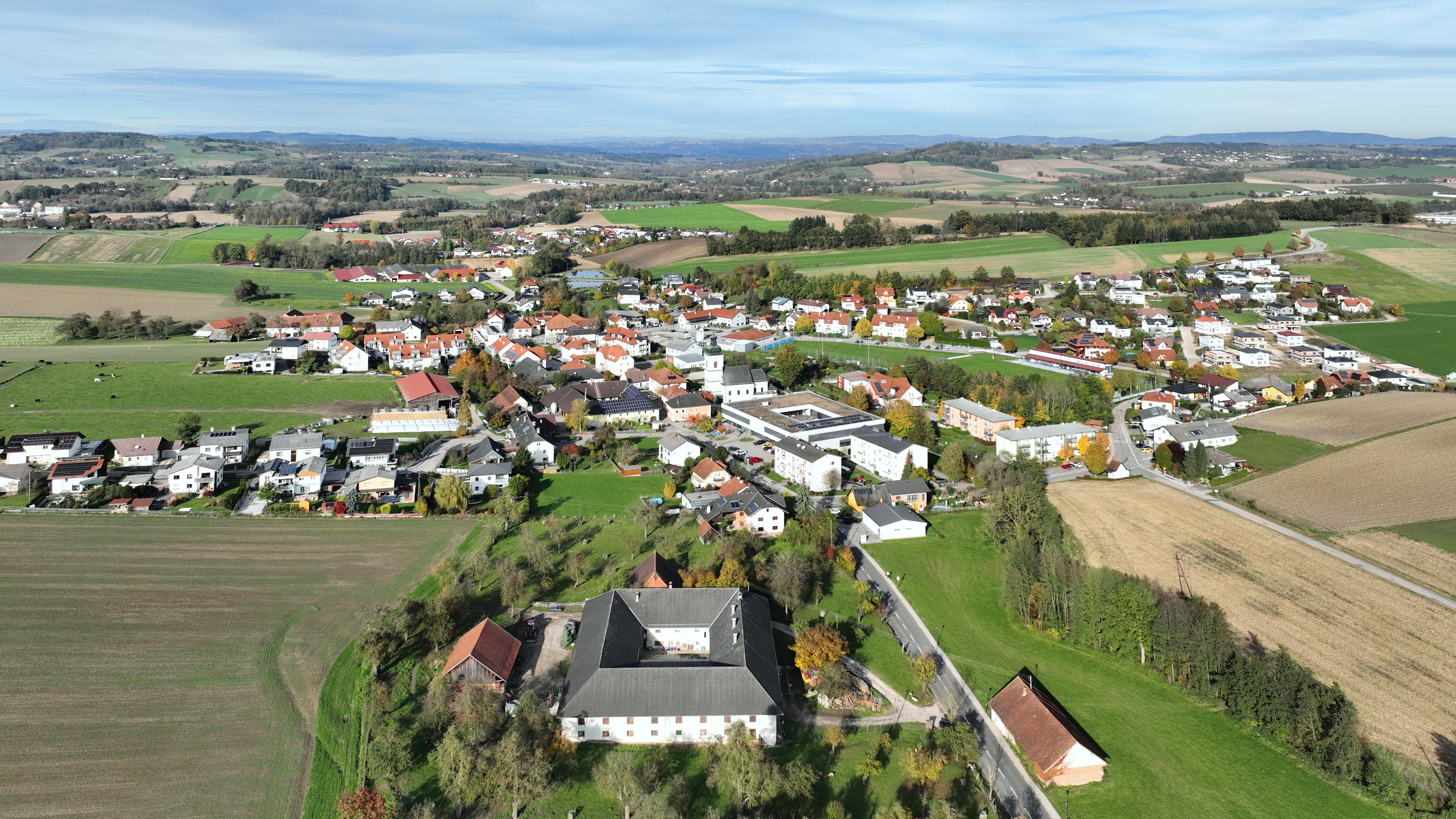
- South view of Krenglbach

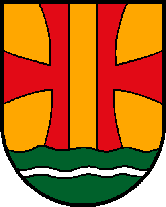
- Coat of arms

- Location within Austria
- Coordinates: 48°12′14″N 13°57′25″E
- Country: Austria
- State: Upper Austria
- District: Wels-Land

Government
  - Mayor: Manfred Zeismann (SPÖ)

Area
  - Total: 15.34 km^{2} (5.92 sq mi)
- Elevation: 310 m (1,020 ft)

Population (2018-01-01)
  - Total: 3,158
  - Density: 205.9/km^{2} (533.2/sq mi)
- Time zone: UTC+1 (CET)
  - Summer (DST): UTC+2 (CEST)
- Postal code: 4631
- Area code: 07249
- Vehicle registration: WL
- Website: www.krenglbach.at

Krenglbach is a municipality in the district of Wels-Land in the Austrian state of Upper Austria.

== Population ==
Historical population
Year	Pop.	±%
1991	2,384	—
2001	2,644	+10.9%
2007	3,073	+16.2%
