= Rio Negro–Rio San Sun mangroves =

Rio Negro-Rio San Sun mangroves
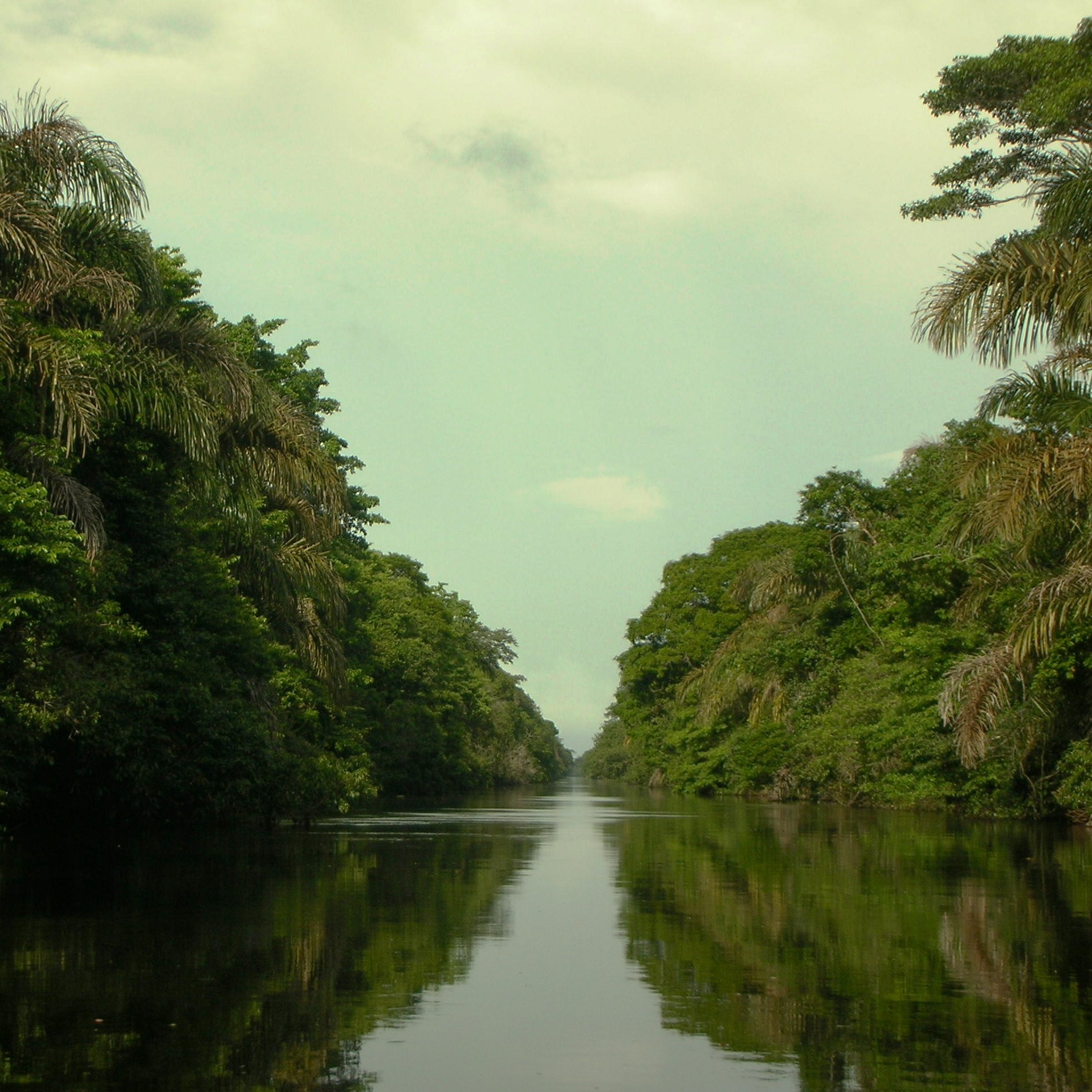
- Barra del Colorado Wildlife Refuge

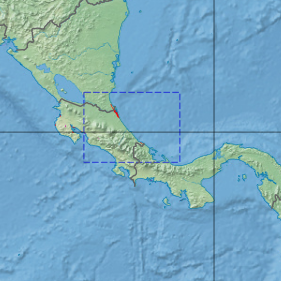
- Ecoregion territory (in purple)

Ecology
- Realm: Neotropic
- Biome: Mangroves

Geography
- Area: 518 km^{2} (200 sq mi)
- Countries: Costa Rica; Nicaragua; Panama
- Coordinates: 10.5°N 83.5°W

The Rio Negro-Rio San Sun mangroves ecoregion (WWF ID:NT1431) covers a series of small of discontinuous mangrove forests on the Caribbean Sea coast of Costa Rica, from a small portion inside the border with Nicaragua in the west to the border with Panama in the east. The coast on this stretch is a flat, alluvial plain, and mangroves are only a small part of a diverse patchwork of local habitats including swamps, mixed rainforests, coastal lagoons, sea grass beds, and sandy beaches. Much of the territory is "blackwater river" in character - slow-moving channels in wooded swamps with water stained by decayed matter. These mangroves are periodically damaged by hurricanes, such as in 1988 from Hurricane Joan, but are able to regenerate.

== Location and description ==
Mangrove are scarce on this coast because of the high levels of freshwater arriving from the interior rivers. The largest tract is in the north at the estuaries of the San Juan River and the Colorado River of Costa Rica. The northern mangrove extends along the Tortuguero Lagoon to the mouth of the Reventazón River. There are further mangroves west of the city of Limón, around the Bay of Moin. Immediately inland, the ecoregion transitions to the Isthmian–Atlantic moist forests ecoregion, beyond the salt-water influence.

== Climate ==
The climate of this ecoregion is Tropical monsoon climate (Köppen climate classification (Am)). This climate is characterized by relatively even temperatures throughout the year (all months being greater than 18 °C (64 °F) average temperature), and a pronounced dry season. The driest month has less than 60 mm of precipitation, but more than (100-(average/25) mm. This climate is mid-way between a tropical rainforest and a tropical savannah. The dry month usually at or right after the winter solstice in the Northern Hemisphere. Rainfall is this ecoregion is among the highest in the world, often reaching 6,000 mm/year. The (relatively) dry season is January to April.

== Flora and fauna ==
The characteristic tree species of the ecoregion are red mangrove (Rhizophora mangle), black mangrove (Avicennia germinans), white mangrove (Laguncularia racemosa), button mangrove (Conocarpus erectus) and the mangrove-associated species Rhizophora harrisonii. A feature of this ecoregion is the presence of yollila (Raphia taedigera), a freshwater palm tree.

This region of Costa Rica has very high species diversity. One partial census in the area around the mangroves recorded 120 mammal species, 300 bird species, and 100 reptile and amphibian species. Mammals in the ecoregion include pacas (Agouti paca), black mantled howler monkey (Alouatta palliata), Geoffrey's spider monkey (Ateles geoffroyi), white-faced capuchin (Cebus capucinus), brown-throated three-toed sloths (Bradypus variegatus), silky anteaters (Cyclopes didactylus) and nine-banded armadillos (Dasypus novemcintus).

Beaches along this stretch of coast are important for nesting green turtles (Chelonia mydas). Other reptiles in the region include Reptiles include the basilisk lizard (Basiliscus basiliscus), caiman (Caiman crocodilus), leatherback turtle (Dermochelys coriacea) and green iguana (genus Iguana).

== Protected areas ==
Officially protected areas in the ecoregion include:

- Indio Maíz Biological Reserve
- Barra del Colorado Wildlife Refuge
- Dr. Archie Carr Wildlife Refuge
- Tortuguero National Park
- Cariari National Wetlands
