= Tortuguero =

Tortuguero (or El Tortuguero; from Spanish "place of turtles") may refer to:

== Places ==
- El Tortuguero, a municipality in the South Caribbean Coast Autonomous Region of Nicaragua
- Tortuguero (Maya site), an archaeological site in southernmost Tabasco, Mexico
- Tortuguero Lagoon, a natural reservoir located between the Puerto Rican municipalities of Vega Baja and Manatí
- Tortuguero National Park, a national park in the Limón Province of Costa Rica, which contains
  - Tortuguero, Costa Rica, a village on the Northern Caribbean coast of Costa Rica
  - Tortuguero Conservation Area, an administrative area managed by SINAC for conservation in Limón Province, Costa Rica
  - Tortuguero River, a river which flows into the Caribbean Sea in Limón Province, Costa Rica

== Other ==
- Battle of Tortuguero, the first naval battle of the Dominican War of Independence
