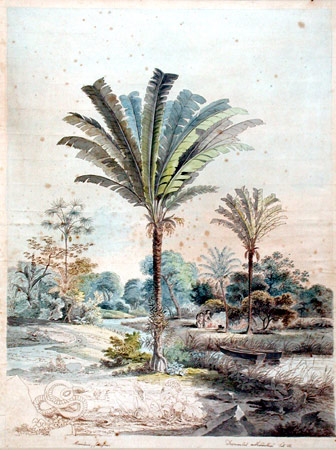
- Manicaria saccifera

Scientific classification
- Kingdom: Plantae
- Clade: Tracheophytes
- Clade: Angiosperms
- Clade: Monocots
- Clade: Commelinids
- Order: Arecales
- Family: Arecaceae
- Subfamily: Arecoideae
- Tribe: Manicarieae
- Genus: Manicaria; Gaertn.

Type species
- Manicaria saccifera Gaertn.

Synonyms
- Pilophora Jacq.

= Manicaria =

Genus of palms

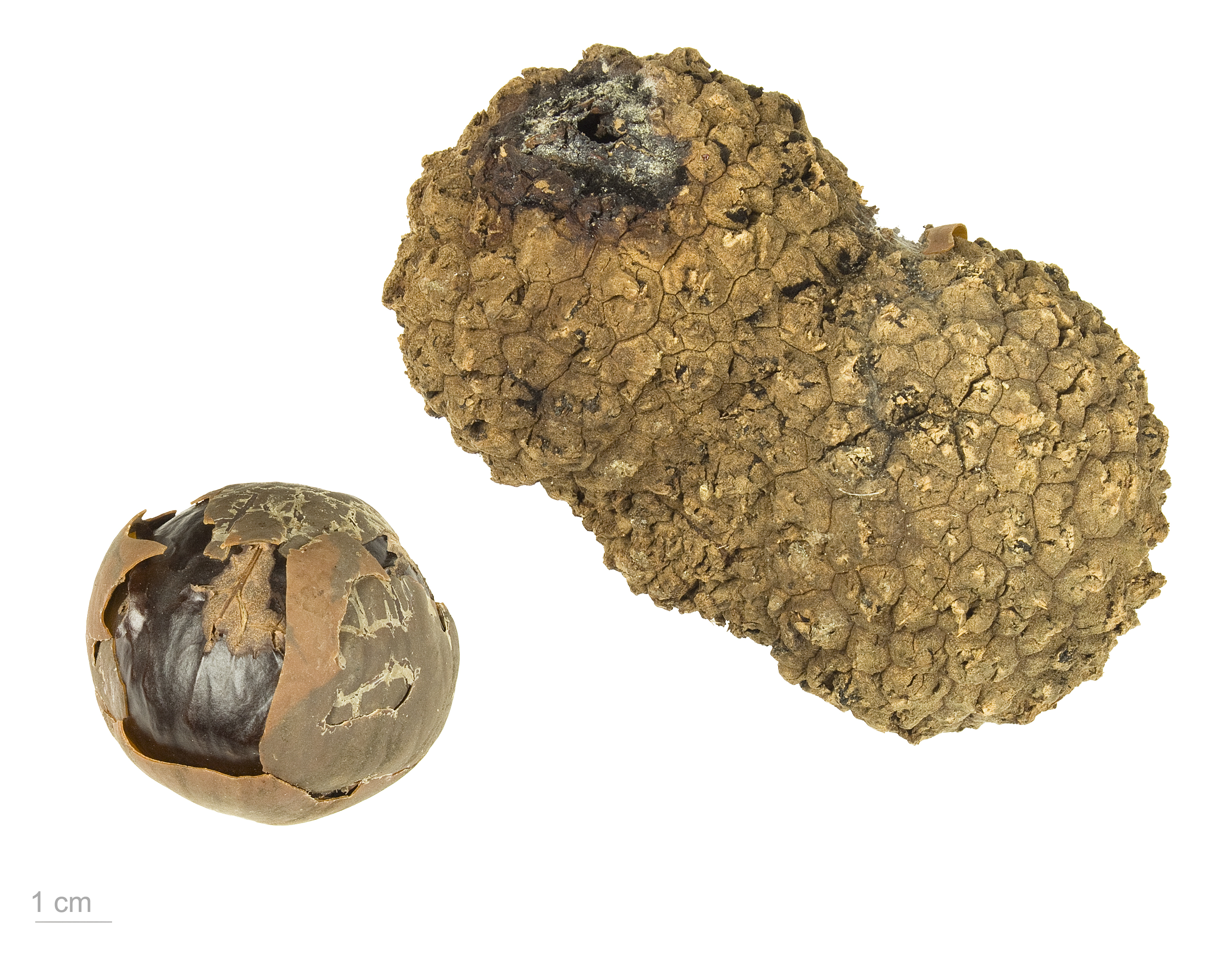
Manicaria saccifera – MHNT

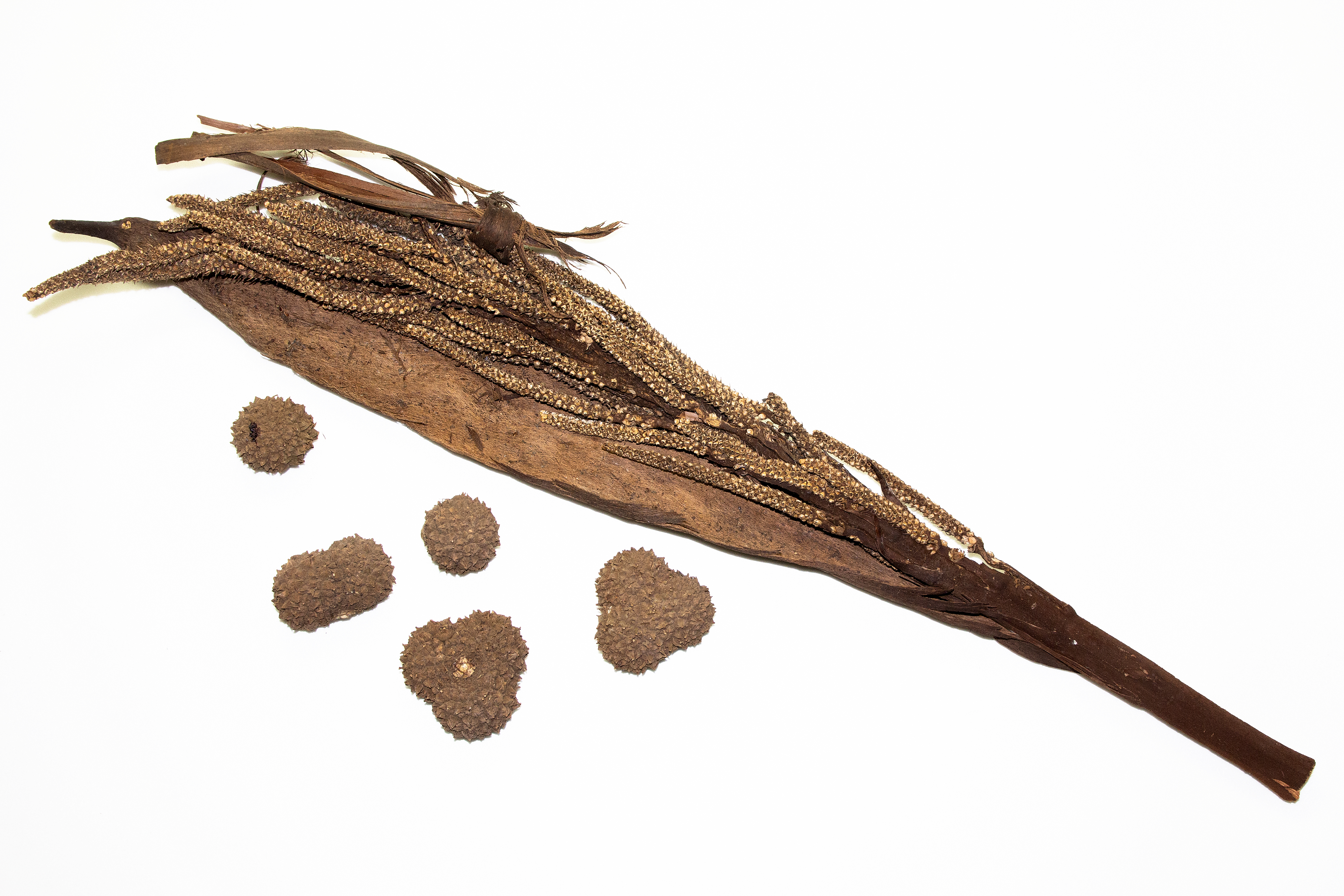
Manicaria saccifera MHNT

Manicaria (Common names Monkey Cap Palm or Bussu) is a palm genus which is found in Trinidad, Central and South America. It contains two accepted species:

1. Manicaria martiana Burret – Colombia, northwestern Brazil
2. Manicaria saccifera Gaertn. – Central America, Trinidad, Venezuela, Colombia, Ecuador, Peru, northwestern Brazil

It has one of the largest known leaves in the plant kingdom, up to 8 metres (26 ft) long. The very largest leaves can be 10.3 m (34 ft) total length, with 9 m (30 ft) being the blade or lamina and a stalk or petiole 1.3 m (4 ft 3 in) long. The blade is up to 2.3 m (7 ft 7 in) wide. It is an entire obovate pinnately veined leaf with marginal teeth.

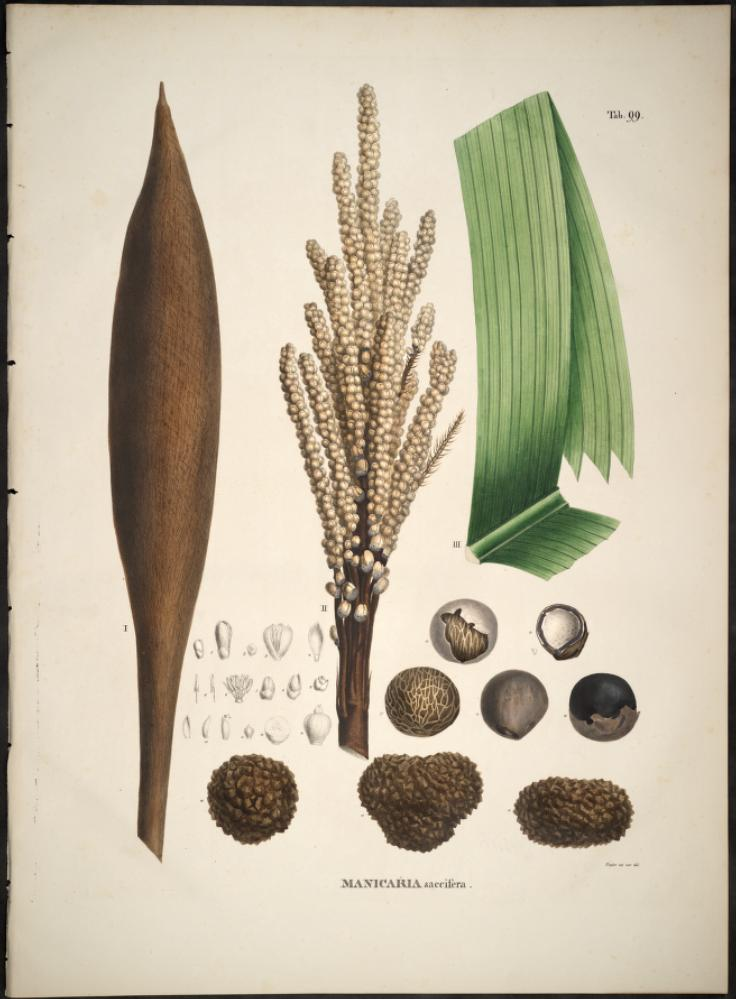
Illustration

Manicaria thrives in swamps or estuarine areas where river meets ocean. In the Tortuguero region of Costa Rica, where Manicaria saccifera is plentiful, local people know this palm as "Palma Real", or "Royal Palm". Its heavy, large leaves are valued over other palm species as the best material for roof thatching. Manicaria saccifera is an obligate swamp species, and as most other palms, it thrives in the wet, humid conditions of tropical lowland forests. Myers (1981) states "In the humid environments of the neo-tropics there is an increase in the abundance of understory palms" (24). Further to this, lowland forests generally have a higher density of palms than upland forests, and palms thrive better in poorly drained, wet soils than dry or well-drained soils. This particular palm can often be found mixed with Raphia palms in swamps and depressions.

== Description ==
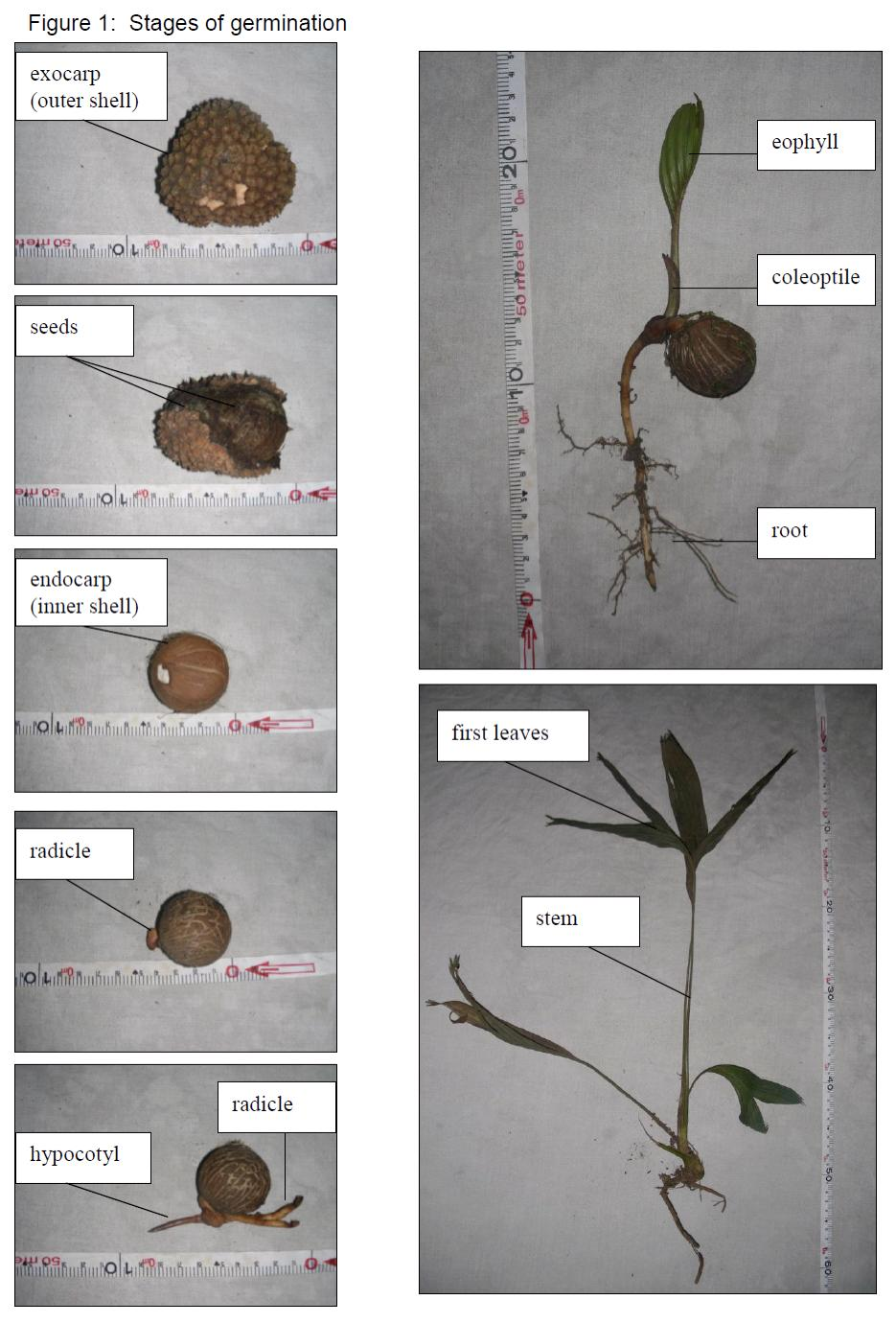
Germination stages

Manicaria saccifera is easy to identify by the enormous, broad leaves and clusters of spiked fruit pods visible at the base of the fronds. The leaves grow in a pinnate shape, and resemble large feathers with irregular separation and serrated edges. They are stiff, tough leaves, and can actually give a sharp “paper cut” if the hand is brushed against them.

The fruits grow in large clusters throughout the year, forming in shells that contain two or three seeds each. The pods fall from the tree and form mounds at the base. Eventually the spiked outer shell of the pod breaks away, revealing the smooth round seed underneath. Some mammals, such as peccaries, eat the white flesh found inside seeds that have fallen and emerged from the tough outer shell, but human consumption of this fruit is not common (Myers, 1981). Since the seeds can float for extended periods of time, water is the main seed distribution method for the Manicaria. Seed dispersal by animals is not effective; Myers (1981) found that seeds which were partially consumed or damaged by animals were not likely to germinate (See Fig. 1). Where mammal activity is high, seed and seedling predation are also very high, so the Manicaria tends to thrive only in swampy regions that are less frequented by mammals.

== Climate and geographical location ==
Myers (1981) states that Manicaria saccifera is an obligate swamp species which grows in freshwater swamps that are frequently flooded by rain or ocean tides. They can often be located in estuarine areas where a river feeds into the ocean, so the rivers or canals along which Manicaria saccifera can be found often contain brackish water. This palm tends to dominate the middle strata with its broad leaves, and can often be found mixed with Raphia palm in depressions, bordering waterways, and in mixed dicotyledonous swamp forests (Myers, 1981). One important area of conservation where Manacaria continues to thrive is in the Tortuguero region on the northeast coast of Costa Rica. According to the Canadian Organization for Tropical Education and Rainforest Conservation (COTERC) (n.d.), the Tortuguero region is an ancient flood plain with a rainfall exceeding 6,000 mm annually and an average daily temperature of 26 degrees Celsius. This area is aseasonal (Myers, 1981) and is considered among the most biologically diverse regions in the country (Koens, Dieperink and Miranda, 2009; World Headquarters, 2007). There are two protected areas that make up much of the Tortuguero region: The Barra del Colorado Wildlife Refuge and Tortuguero National Park, both which lie within the Área de Conservación Tortuguero (ACTO).

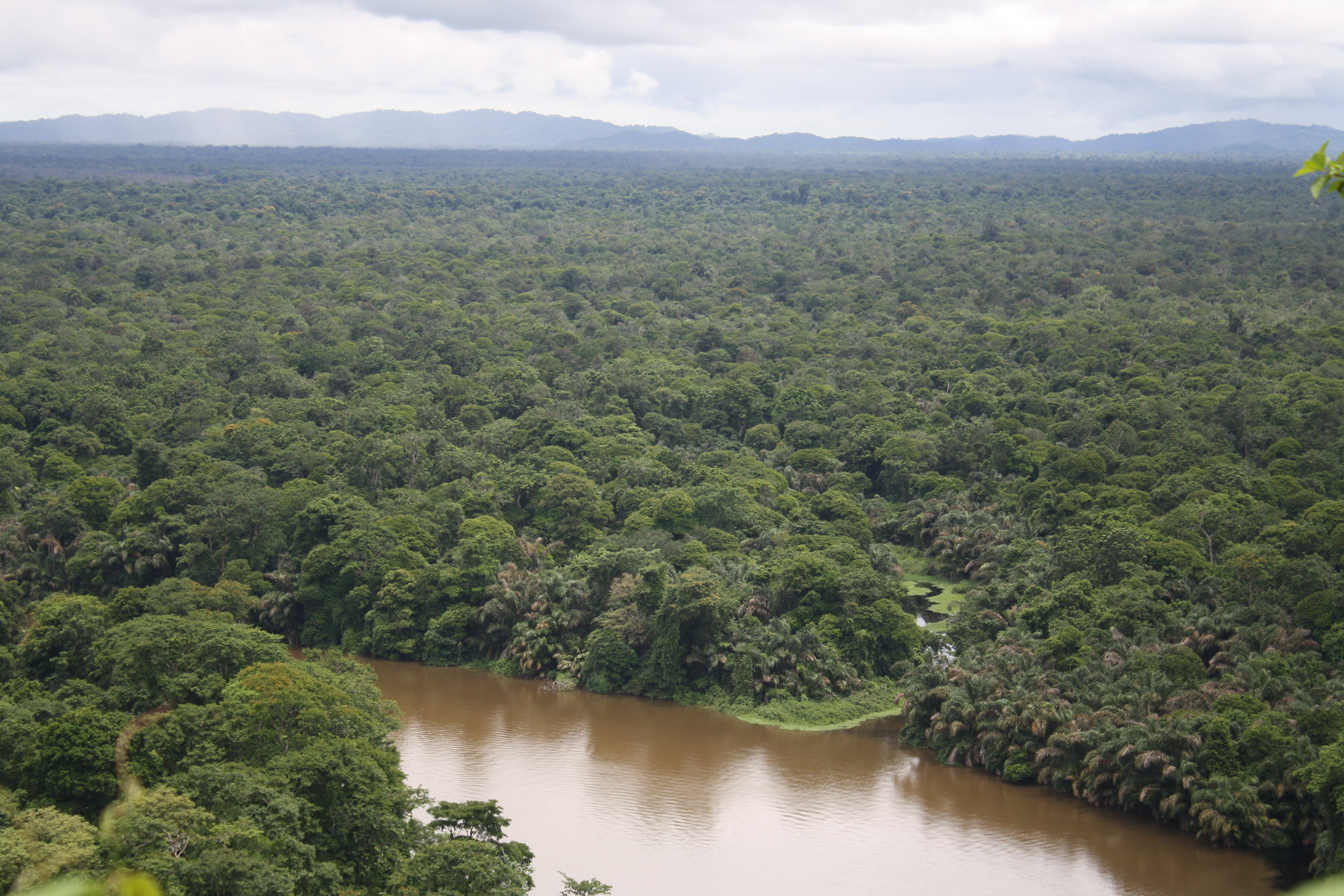
Lowland forests and palm swamps in Costa Rica

== Density and local use of Manicaria saccifera in Tortuguero, Costa Rica ==
To learn about the current state of the population and local use of Manicaria saccifera in more detail, an applied Anthropological study of this palm was conducted at the southernmost tip of the Barra del Colorado Wildlife Refuge in Costa Rica by a Laurentian University Anthropology field course, in conjunction with Caño Palma Biological Station. The station lies along the Caño Palma (Palm Canal) in Tortuguero National Park, which rests within the Barra del Colorado Wildlife Refuge. Caño Palma is a palm-filled blackwater canal made up of hydromorphic soils that developed due to poor drainage (Myers, 1981) and has an average rainfall greater than 6,000 mm annually. This habitat is a prime location for Manicaria saccifera to grow and thrive.

From an applied Anthropological approach, the biological and sociocultural aspects of this ecologically prominent palm species were considered. The study found that the density of the Manicaria palm was highest in wet, swampy habitat with lower density at all life stages within drier substrate. Thus, this palm thrives in a very specific habitat, and destruction of that habitat by commercial agricultural drainage of wetlands can impact the population negatively.

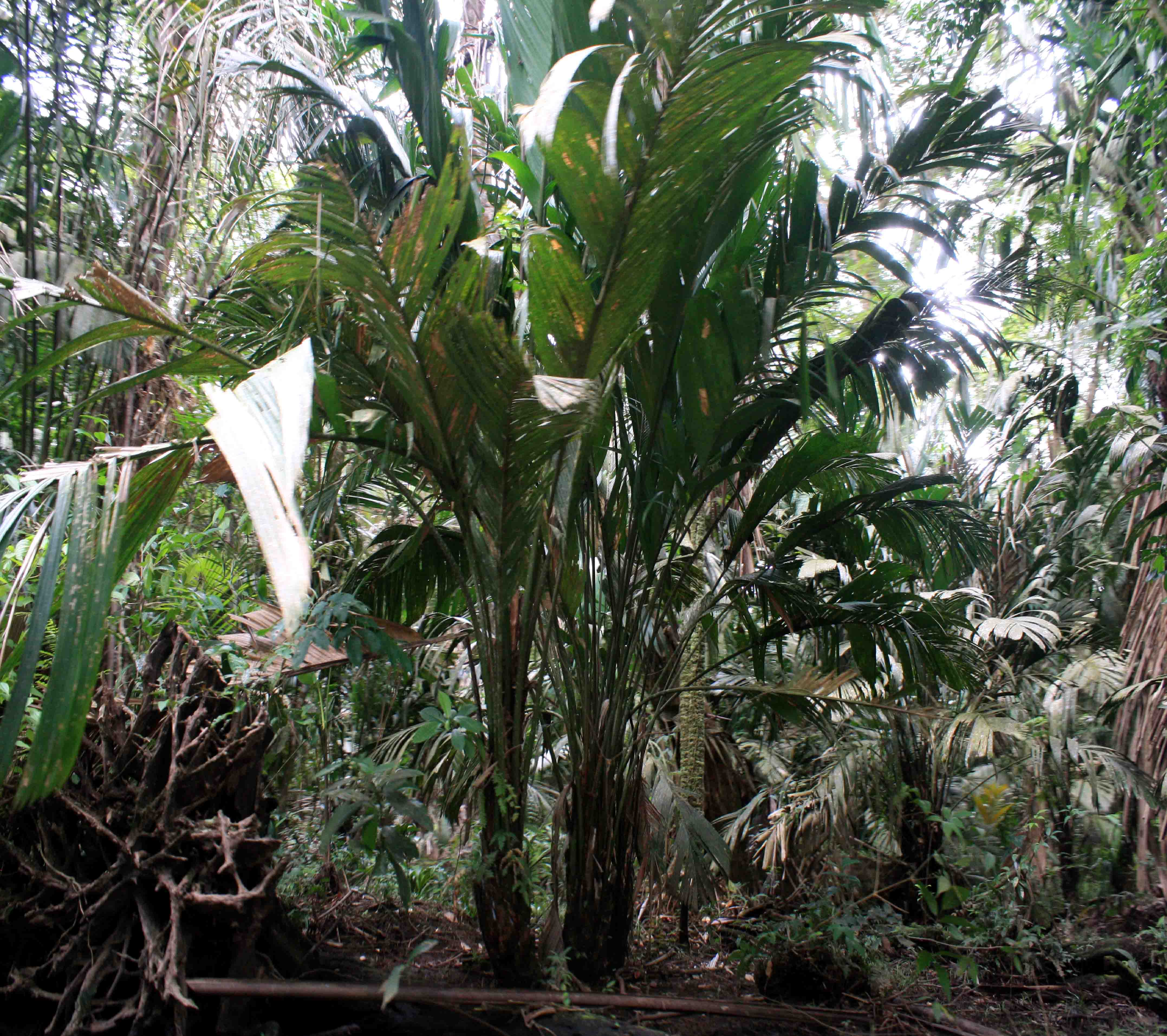
Juvenile stage Manicaria saccifera

== Destruction of Manicaria saccifera habitat ==
The construction of banana plantations in Costa Rica has had a negative impact on both ecological and social aspects. The cultivation of bananas requires large amounts of land, large amounts of fertilizers and pesticides, and extensive systems of shallow canals and drainage ditches (Astorga, 1998). This alteration of the landscape inevitably leads to deforestation, and the loss of tropical flora and fauna biodiversity. In order to develop a banana plantation, marshes are drained, streams are channelized, and drainage canals are constructed to prevent flooding of the fields (McCracken 1998). Historically the agricultural banana industry has been a threat to the Manicaria saccifera population in Costa Rica. The Manicaria grows and thrives in swampland and if these areas continue to be drained for agricultural use, this species of palm, along with many others will quickly disappear.

== Human use ==
Many different species of palms have been useful to humans now and throughout history. Palms of all types can be used for "thatch for houses, wood to support dwellings, ropes, strings, weavings, hunting bows, fishing line, hooks, utensils, musical instruments, and various kinds of food and drink" (Kricher, 1997:28).

In the Tortuguero region of Costa Rica, “Palma Real” is mainly valued for roof thatch. Historically, according to Lefevre (1992), the Tortuguero region was dominated by the Suerre people prior to the 16th century. The Suerre, according to linguistic analysis, are thought to be related to the Talamancan tribes from southern Costa Rica. The Suerre used Manicaria saccifera to thatch cone-shaped ranchos, and slept on palm floors. In 1502, Columbus encountered 50-80,000 people living in the area. The Miskito from Nicaragua immigrated into the area and primarily used palm thatch for their homes. Tortuguero village became a well-used shipping port for coconuts and bananas produced by local plantations. By 1930-1940 Walter Martinez, along with his children and two or three other families settled into the Tortuguero area and constructed four poled ranchos using palm (Lefevre, 1992). Around 1995-1996, Tortuguero’s houses were still primarily roofed with palm thatch. Manicaria saccifera was the preferred palm for thatching due to its wider leaves which cover more area. It was around this time that the permit system was introduced by the Costa Rican government to limit the harvesting of many natural resources, including the Manicaria. As of 2010, very few buildings have thatched roofs other than the ranchos that many tourist lodges provide for their guests.

== The permit system ==
Wildlife conservation permits in Costa Rica were established in 1992 with the Ley de Conservacion de la Vida Silvestre, or the Law on Wildlife Conservation (hereafter referred to as Law 7317). It is possible that another permit system was in place before this law was introduced, but no evidence has been found to confirm or deny this. According to Article 1 of Law 7317, its purpose is to regulate and monitor the appropriation and trade of natural resources within Costa Rica and to assure any extraction is done so in a sustainable fashion. All natural resources are declared of the interest of the State and any extraction, anywhere in Costa Rica, requires a permit. More specifically, anyone in Costa Rica who wants to harvest Manicaria saccifera will need to obtain permission from MINAET to do so legally. The permit system is one of many possible factors contributing to a decline in thatch use in Costa Rica but should not be considered independent of other social and economic factors.

== Changing attitudes ==
Research conducted during the Laurentian University field course indicates that there has been a drastic shift within the past few decades in regards to the use of Manicaria saccifera as roofing material for dwellings. Even though there were some obvious advantages to using the Manicaria saccifera for thatch, such as its durability and its ability to help cool down a building as well as being waterproof, many locals were actually moving away from using the palm as roofing material. There appears to be a variety of reasons for this decline including difficulty in obtaining permits, physical difficulty of harvest work in swamp areas, and undesirable creatures such as scorpions, snakes and bats making their homes in the thatch. It appeared that most people generally now prefer to use tin or plastic as their roofing material since it is relatively cheap and much easier to obtain and use than the Manicaria palm.

== Traditional harvesting and thatching ==
The process of harvesting Manicaria saccifera leaves and using them to build a durable roof is a complicated process which requires a great deal of knowledge, effort, and skill. The size of leaves that are harvested for thatching purposes may vary with regard to the fact that Manicaria fronds may grow anywhere from two to seven meters tall, though most often leaves that are at least four to five meters in length are preferred. The number of leaves harvested from each tree also varies. Anywhere from 10 to 20 leaves are removed from a tree during a harvest, though most often locals indicated that 10 leaves are removed. Many leaves are needed to thatch a roof. For a house it may take anywhere between 400 and 7000 leaves, and a rancho may need 1000 to 2500 leaves. Although these numbers seem surprising, the numbers are actually fewer than if other plants were used, because the Manicaria leaves are so large.

The best time to harvest leaves varies, although most locals seem to agree that one should harvest when the moon is in menguante (after the full moon), usually anywhere from 3 to 15 days. Most also agree that this is because natural pesticides found in the Manicaria saccifera are released at this time and prevent insects from damaging the roofing.

In order to thatch a roof certain steps must be taken. First, one must get a permit and then collect the leaves. Once this is complete the leaves must be prepared for thatching. This is done by splitting the leaves in half by dragging a piece of wood lengthwise through the spines. When doing this it is important to be careful as the split leaf is very sharp, as “sharp as a machete”. After the leaves have been cut they are attached to the roof frame either by the use of knots (the older technique) or by nails.

The tradition of thatching is being lost within the Tortuguero region of Costa Rica. Fewer people are using thatch and since the process of learning thatch is done through observation, those of the younger generation may never have the opportunity to see a thatched roof being constructed and thus they may never learn. Yet despite this, most lodges still use palm thatch on ranchos, and with the growing tourism industry the tradition may not be completely lost to future generations. However, while it is possible that one may work at a lodge that does thatching and have an opportunity to learn how to thatch, it is apparent that overall the traditional usage of palm for non-tourist dwellings is dwindling, and few individuals are learning to harvest thatch properly in the traditional way.

== Conservation ==
The Laurentian University field researchindicates that during a Manicaria harvest, special attention is given to how much of each palm was harvested for thatching purposes. Mainly, it was indicated that least three leaves are left on each tree so that the palms were able to regenerate. Also, the harvest location was rotated to further ensure that regeneration of the Manicaria saccifera occurs. Although locals practice these two types of management to ensure that the palm does regenerate, they also indicated that they believe that this palm is a plant that will regenerate quickly and is not at risk of overharvesting, especially if done properly.

In summary, research revealed that what is crucial in terms of the proper management of the Manicaria saccifera is regulating the clearing and draining of land for agriculture, highways, and other developments. As Manicaria saccifera only grows in wetland areas, clearing too many wetland areas can cause these its habitat to dry up. Continued appropriate conservation management in this important region and all wetlands where this important palm occurs will continue to ensure its survival.
