= Canadian Organization for Tropical Education and Research =

Canada-based charity

Canadian Organization for Tropical Education and Research (COTERC)
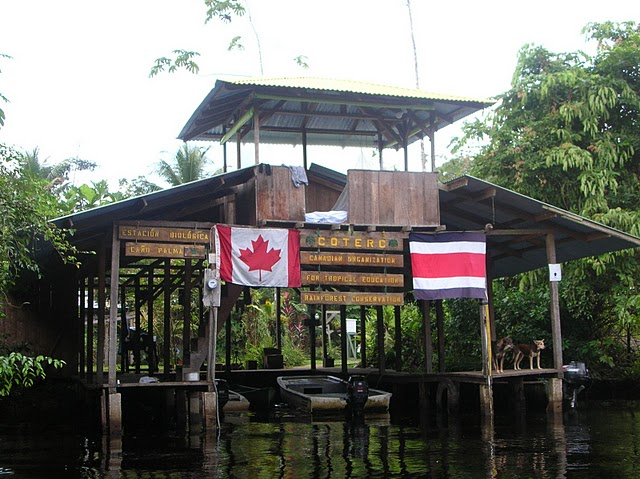
- Boat dock in Cano Palma, Costa Rica
- Abbreviation: COTERC
- Formation: 1991
- Type: Not-for-profit Charity
- Legal status: active
- Headquarters: Pickering, Ontario
- Location(s): Pickering, Ontario; Tortuguero, Costa Rica
- Region served: Canada; Costa Rica
- Website: coterc.org

The Canadian Organization for Tropical Education and Rainforest Conservation (COTERC) is a registered not-for-profit Canadian-based charity. COTERC was founded in 1991 by Marilyn Cole and Ozzie Teichner, and is based in Pickering, Ontario, Canada. COTERC maintains a close reciprocal relationship in Costa Rica with Caño Palma Biological Station.

== Background ==
The Canadian Organization for Tropical Education and Rainforest Conservation was founded in 1991 to protect tropical rainforests. The board of directors comprises biologists, accountants, educators, environmentalists, zoo professionals, and media professionals operating in both Canada and Costa Rica. The organization's mission is to provide leadership in education, research, conservation, and the educated use of natural resources in the tropics.

The Canadian Organization for Tropical Education and Rainforest Conservation has worked closely with the Toronto Zoo for 20 years. In Canada, a teaching guide for rainforests based on the Ontario curriculum is available to teachers along with over 50 fact sheets on the wildlife of the Tortuguero Region of Costa Rica.

== Caño Palma Biological Station ==
The station was founded and continues to be supported by the Canadian Organization for Tropical Education and Research. Located inside the Barra del Colorado Wildlife Refuge, the Caño Palma Biological Station is about five miles (18 km) north of Tortuguero, Costa Rica on its north-east coast. The Biological Station is adjacent to a palm-filled canal (Spanish translation, caño palma) that separates the station from the Caribbean Sea by a mere 200–300 metres. Once an ancient floodplain, this Atlantic tropical wet forest covers the lowlands and is one of Costa Rica's richest biological ecosystems. Due to being a secondary growth forest, the region provides a home for unique plant and animal species.

Some endangered species such as the green, leatherback, hawksbill and loggerhead sea turtles nest on beaches accessible from the station. Access to Caño Palma can only be made by boat via a network of rivers and canals.

== Research ==
The biological station hosts researchers, university groups, interns and volunteers. They work on independent research or assist with long-term monitoring projects. The station receives interns from tertiary institutions such as York University, HAS Hogeschool and Vanier College

Ongoing monitoring projects have included conservation work on sea-turtle nesting sites, mammal monitoring, bird-breeding studies, migratory-bird studies, reptile and amphibian diversity surveys, and surveys of the freshwater fish in the Tortuguero region.

=== Marine Turtle Monitoring ===
The marine-turtle monitoring, being the largest project at the station, looks to conserve and protect existing sea-turtle species. The program began in 2004, with tagging of the species beginning in 2006. The project also works with the Sea Turtle Conservancy and the Ministry of Environment, Energy and Sea (MINAEM) of Costa Rica to gain a wider understanding of the species. Playa Norte, the beach that the station is near, is home to four of the existing seven sea-turtle species including green, leatherback, hawksbill and loggerhead sea turtles. During nesting season (March until November), volunteers and interns survey the beach to insure safe nesting and hatching of the sea turtles.

=== Bird Monitoring ===
Long-term monitoring of the endangered Great Green Macaw (Ara ambiguus) has been running since 2013, with multiple weekly surveys. Shorebird surveying, ran from 2012-2017. From 1991, first under the National Museum of Costa Rica and then in 1994 with the Tortuguero Integrated Bird Monitoring Program, the Station was involved in mist-netting and migratory bird monitoring. The mist-netting program worked under the guidelines of Partners in Flight to ensure the safety and conservation of the bird populations. Area searches and mist-netting were both used in weekly data collection.

=== Caiman Census ===
Surveys of the canal are done once a week to gather information on the local caiman population. 2001-2002 station manager Paul Grant came to the station in 2006 to study the local caiman populations. Through his work, Grant found that the pesticides from surrounding locations were negatively impacting the local spectacled caiman. His work was published in National Geographic on September 30, 2013. From 2013 weekly nocturnal surveys have been run on Caño Palma, with regular diurnal surveys starting in 2025.

=== Large Mammal Monitoring ===
This project has established baseline data on the presence of large mammals and each of the three primate species ranging in and inhabiting the Caño Palma and Tortuguero region's lowland rainforest. Three Costa Rican primate species that inhabit the area include the mantled howler, white-headed capuchin and spider monkey. Other large mammals include the jaguar, the tapir, and white-lipped peccary among many others. Using two established transects, volunteers record the presence/absence of mammal vocalizations, visuals and tracks. Project data provides an improved understanding of demographic parameters, distribution, habitat use, and foraging behaviour, and has been collected weekly along 3 transects since 2013.

=== Plant Phenology ===
Once a month, two local forest plots are surveyed. Data include percentages of new leaves, flowering and fruiting plants. In 2012, a Vanier College intern started an ACER (Association for Canadian Educational Resources) forest plot on the station's property. This project follows Smithsonian Institution protocols to inventory, then monitor forests, using 1-hectare plots. The ACER protocols have since been applied to a second plot on Cerro Tortuguero.

== Facilities ==
In the past five years, facilities have been built to house over 30 students and volunteers. The one-acre compound consists of a central kitchen and dining room with a surrounding library, dormitory, and washroom facilities. The site at Caño Palma has provided data for PhD and MES theses, internships are available year round.
