= Tortuguero Protected Zone =

Protected area in Costa Rica

- Zona Protectora Tortuguero
- IUCN category VI (protected area with sustainable use of natural resources)
- Location within Costa Rica
- Location: Costa Rica
- Coordinates: 10.541°N 83.572°W
- Area: 59.97 square kilometres (23.15 sq mi)
- Established: 24 October 1990
- Governing body: National System of Conservation Areas (SINAC)

Tortuguero Protected Zone (Spanish: Zona Protectora Tortuguero), is a protected area in Costa Rica, managed under the Tortuguero Conservation Area, it was created in 1990 by executive decree 19971-MIRENEM. It is located next to Tortuguero National Park.
