= Tortuguero National Park =

National park in the Limón Province of Costa Rica

- IUCN category II (national park)
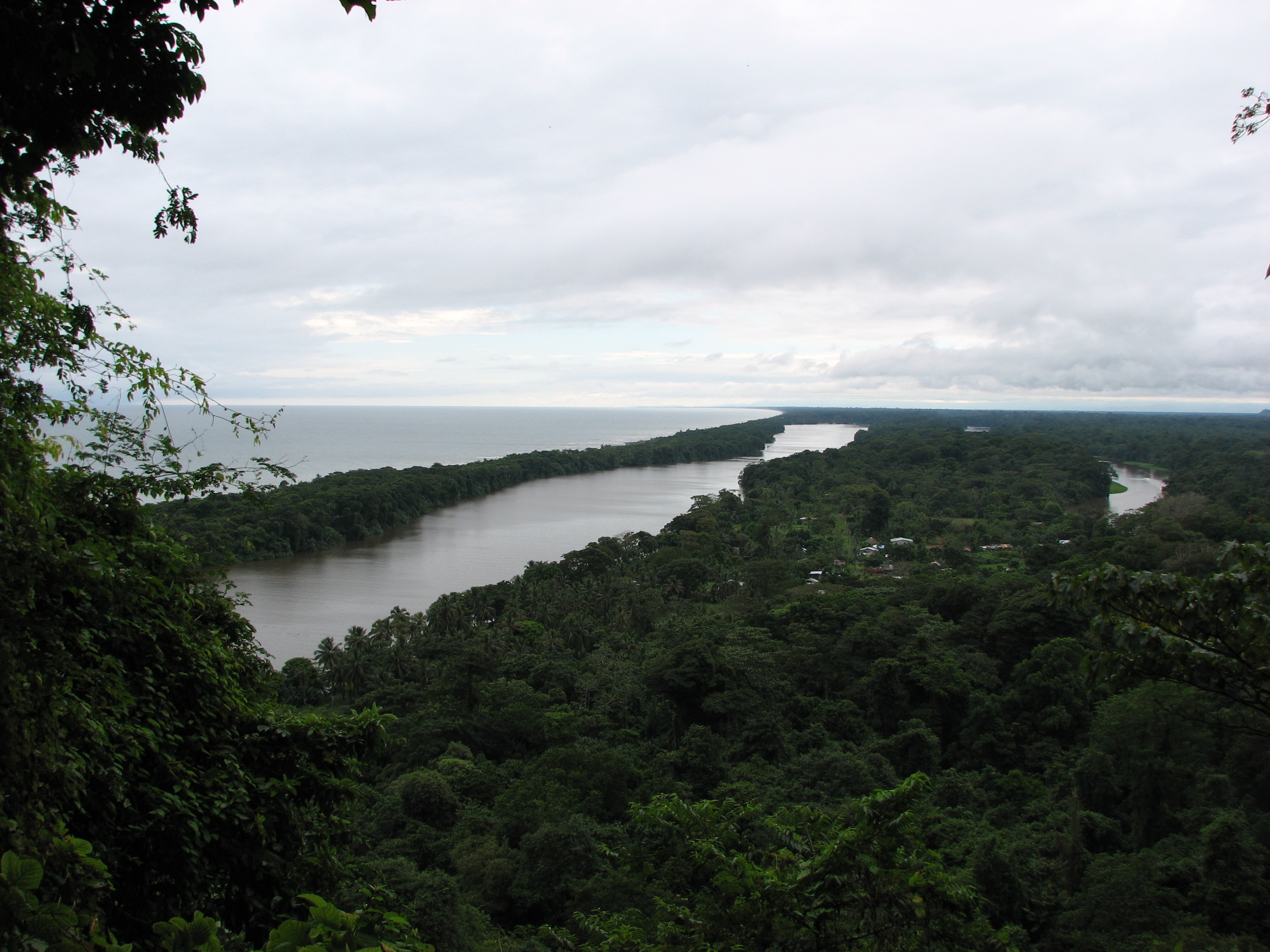
- View from Tortuguero Mountain
- Location: Costa Rica
- Nearest city: Tortuguero
- Coordinates: 10°32′28″N 83°30′08″W
- Area: 312 km^{2} (120 sq mi)(194 m^{2})
- Established: 1975
- Visitors: 10,000 (in 1995)
- Governing body: National System of Conservation Areas (SINAC)
- Location in Costa Rica

Ramsar Wetland
- Official name: Humedal Caribe Noreste
- Designated: 20 March 1996
- Reference no.: 811

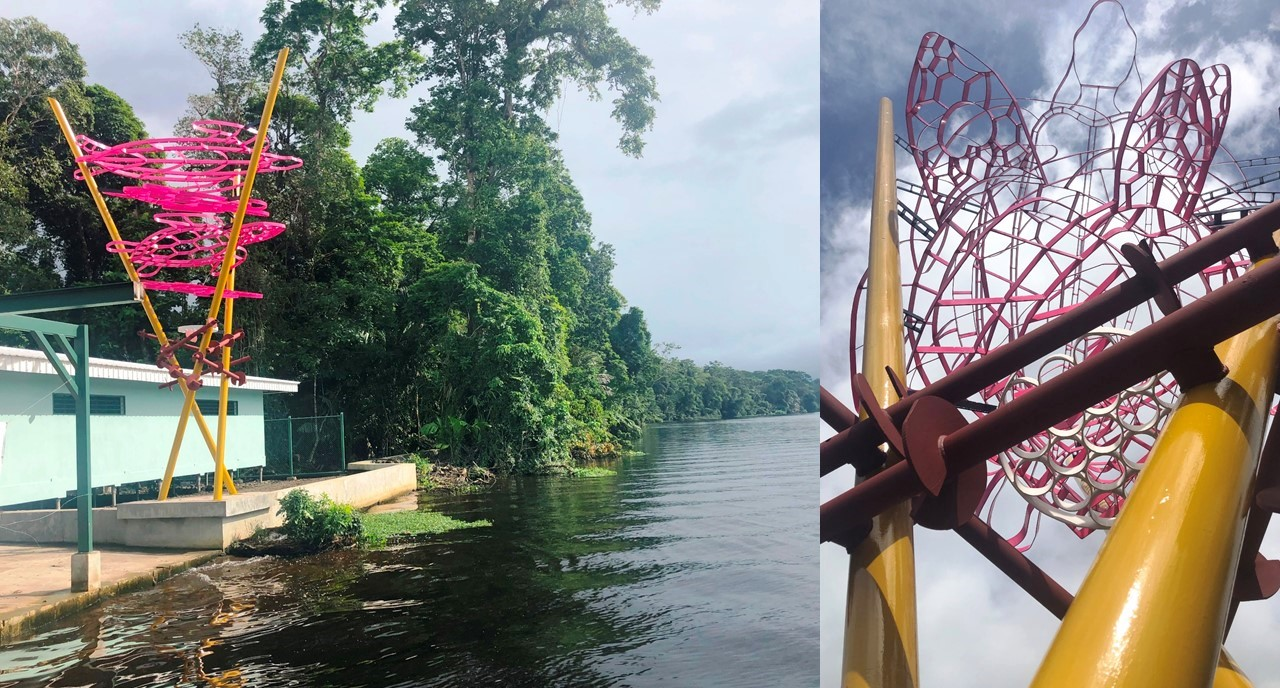
View of Control Office of Tortuguero National Park

|Tortuguero National Park is a national park in the Limón Province of Costa Rica. It is situated within the Tortuguero Conservation Area of the northeastern part of the country. Despite its remote location, reachable only by airplane or boat, it is the third-most visited park in Costa Rica. The park has a large variety of biological diversity due to the existence within the reserve of eleven different habitats, including rainforest, mangrove forests, swamps, beaches, and lagoons. Located in a tropical climate, it is very humid, and receives up to 250 inches (6,400 mm) of rain a year.

The park, a protected area within the northeastern Caribbean wetlands, was recognized under Ramsar Convention on 3 March 1991 for its rich biological diversity and ecosystems that support threatened flora and fauna species. Set in a natural wetland of the Caribbean coast, it forms a corridor with another protected area, the Indio Maíz Biological Reserve of Nicaragua. It is a key Ramsar Site.

== Geography ==
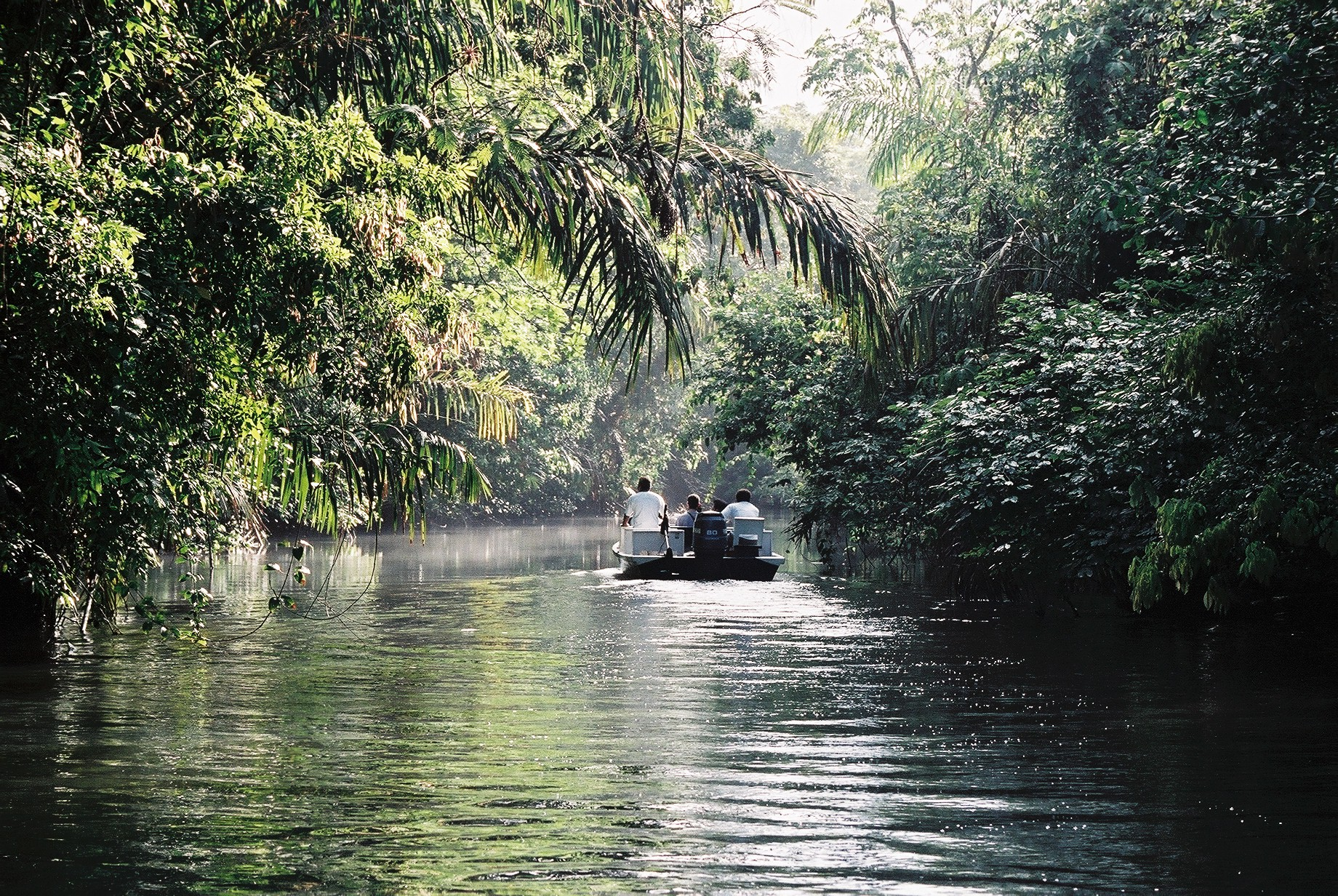
Boat trip into the canals of Tortuguero

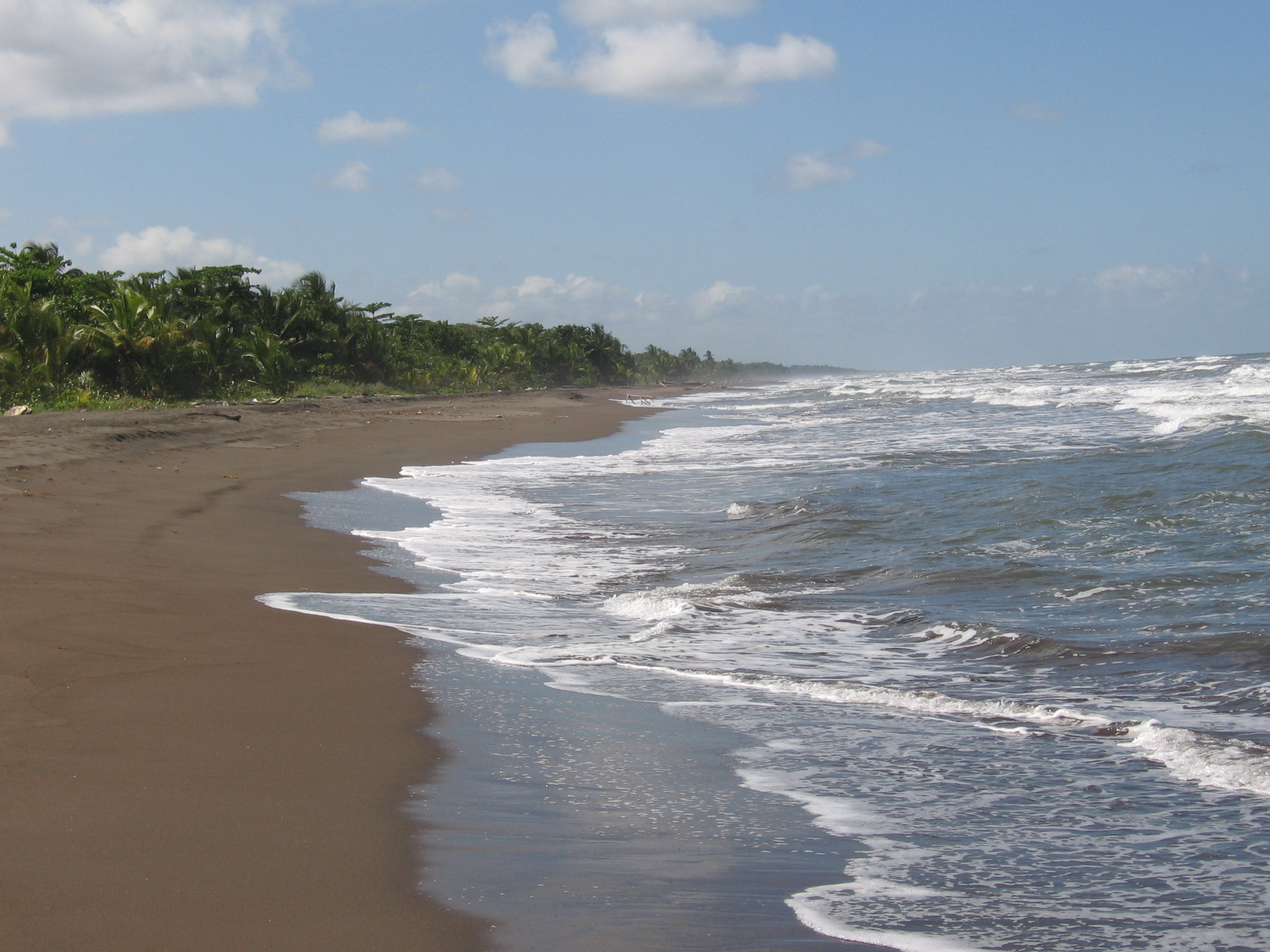
Beach at Tortuguero National Park

The park is located on the Caribbean coast of Costa Rica and covers an area of 77,032 acres (31,174 ha). It is bounded with an elevation range of 0–230 metres (0–755 ft), indicative of a sea coastal region to low hilly topography. The Tortuguero National Park has over 20 miles of coastline, which provides sea turtles a protected place to lay their eggs. Tortuguero is bordered on the north by the Barra del Colorado Wildlife Refuge (with habitats and climate similar to Tortuguero), to the south by the mouth of the Parismina River and the Cariari National Wetlands, the town of Tortuguero at the mouth of the Tortuguero River, and the Dr. Archie Carr Wildlife Refuge, which is a biological station to carry out turtle tagging program run by the Caribbean Conservation Corporation (Now known as the Sea Turtle Conservancy).

While volcanic activity is reported as the formation of a group of small islands, erosion has created the depressions which have a permeable base of "light grey, broken lava rocks, with harder rocks and grey or dark grey lavas overlying". Sandy soils resulting from sedimentation dominate the reserve with the formation of parallel bars in the coastal area. The depressions are subject to filling by ephemeral floods; estuary lakes, grassy marshes, and wooded swamps caused by very heavy rainfall. Small tides of about 40 centimetres (16 in) height have also affected the coastal zone. The small rivers and streams that originate in the hills and flow through the park generally have water 3 metres (9.8 ft) deep. The lakes in the northern part of the reserve are fed by the Colorado River. The very humid tropical forest is influenced by excessive humidity, rapid drainage, and thin soils, with over 330 days of cloud cover per year. Moisture-laden winds come from the Caribbean.

The park has worked with the neighboring village of Tortuguero to help its inhabitants understand that preserving their natural resources is the key to encourage eco-tourism. With rich water resources from precipitation of 250 inches (6,400 mm) per year, the drainage system of the park is fed by many rivers. There are a large number of interlinked canals, waterways, navigable lagoons, and lakes that create plains of sediment carried by the river system. The plains are interspersed with rolling hills of forest that were created in ancient days from volcanic cinder cones, of which the Tortuguero Hill and the Lomas de Sierpe of 1,000 feet (300 m) height could be mentioned.

Enforcement of protection has remained a challenge. Swaths of the park have been semi-legally clear-cut, the damage which allows access to habitat of endangered sea turtles.

The following table synthesizes the primary ecological zones, hydrological characteristics, and floral associations within the Tortuguero wetland complex:

Ecological Zoning, Hydrogeology, and Habitat Structure of Tortuguero National Park
Ecological Zone / Habitat	Substrate & Hydrogeological Dynamics	Dominant Vegetation	Ecological Role & Target Fauna
Coastal Barrier & Marine Beach	High-energy littoral sands with parallel barrier spits; micro-tidal regime (~40 cm)	Creeping vines, coastal grasses, and fringe maritime scrub	Primary western Caribbean nesting rookery for green turtles (Chelonia mydas) and leatherbacks (Dermochelys coriacea).
Canals, Estuarine Lagoons & Waterways	Navigable interconnected river mouths fed by the Colorado and Tortuguero rivers; deep silt deposits	Floating macrophytes (Eichhornia crassipes, Salvinia) and submerged vegetation	Core feeding and reproduction habitat for the West Indian manatee (Trichechus manatus) and tropical gar (Atractosteus tropicus).
Herbaceous Marshes & Palm Swamps (Yolillales)	Poorly drained, permanently flooded peat and organic depressions	Monospecific stands of yolillo palm (Raphia taedigera) and Manicaria saccifera	Buffer zones absorbing extreme regional precipitation (~6,400 mm/yr); foraging grounds for caimans and wading birds.
Lowland Humid Forest & Basaltic Hills	Weathered volcanic cinder cones (Cerro Tortuguero, Lomas de Sierpe) and thin residual clays	Multi-tiered canopy with gavilán (Pentaclethra macroloba) and endangered almendro (Dipteryx oleifera)	Terrestrial corridor connecting with Indio Maíz; refuge for jaguars (Panthera onca), tapirs (Tapirus bairdii), and arboreal primates.

== Fauna and flora ==
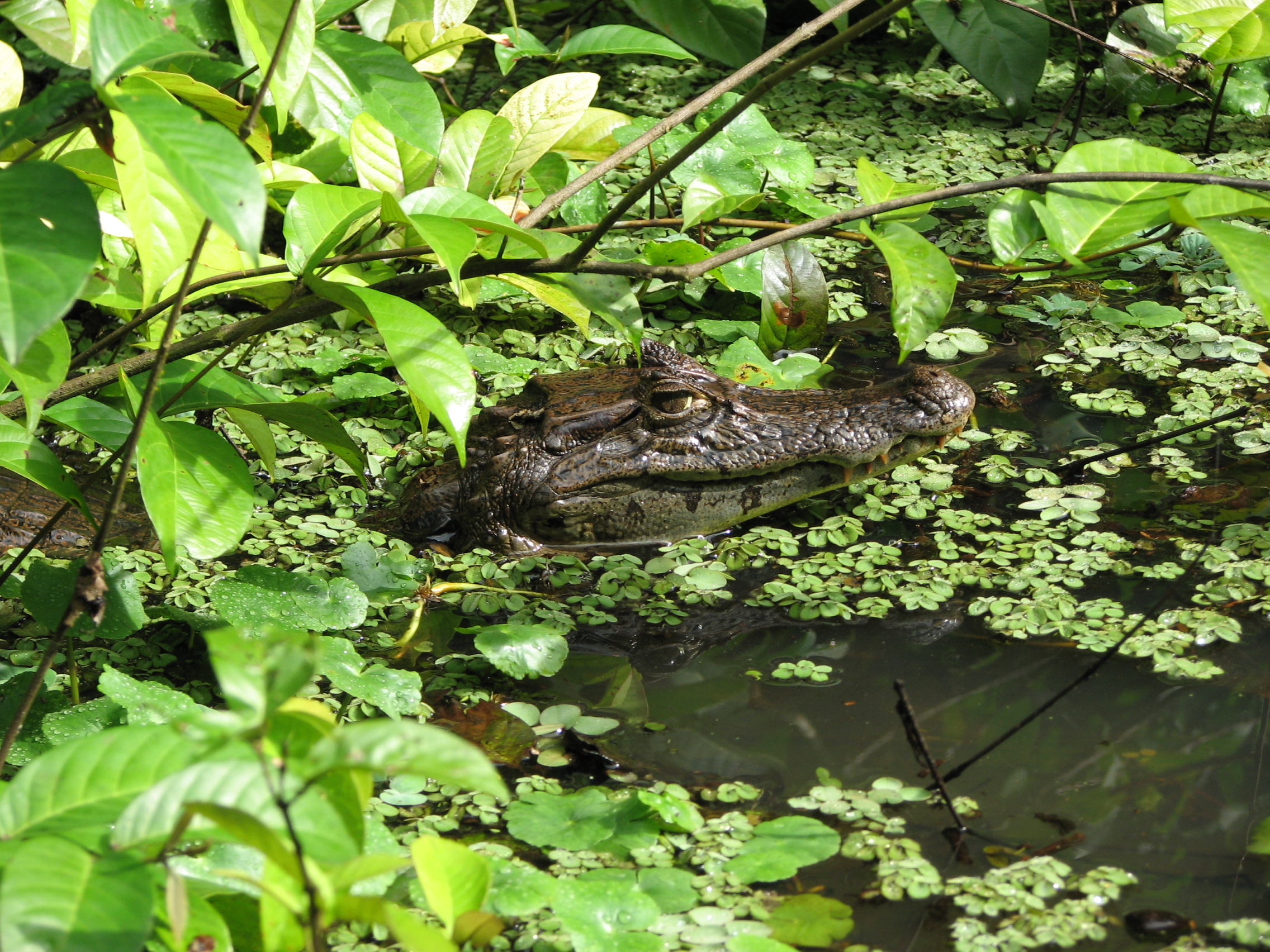
Spectacled caiman in Tortuguero National Park.

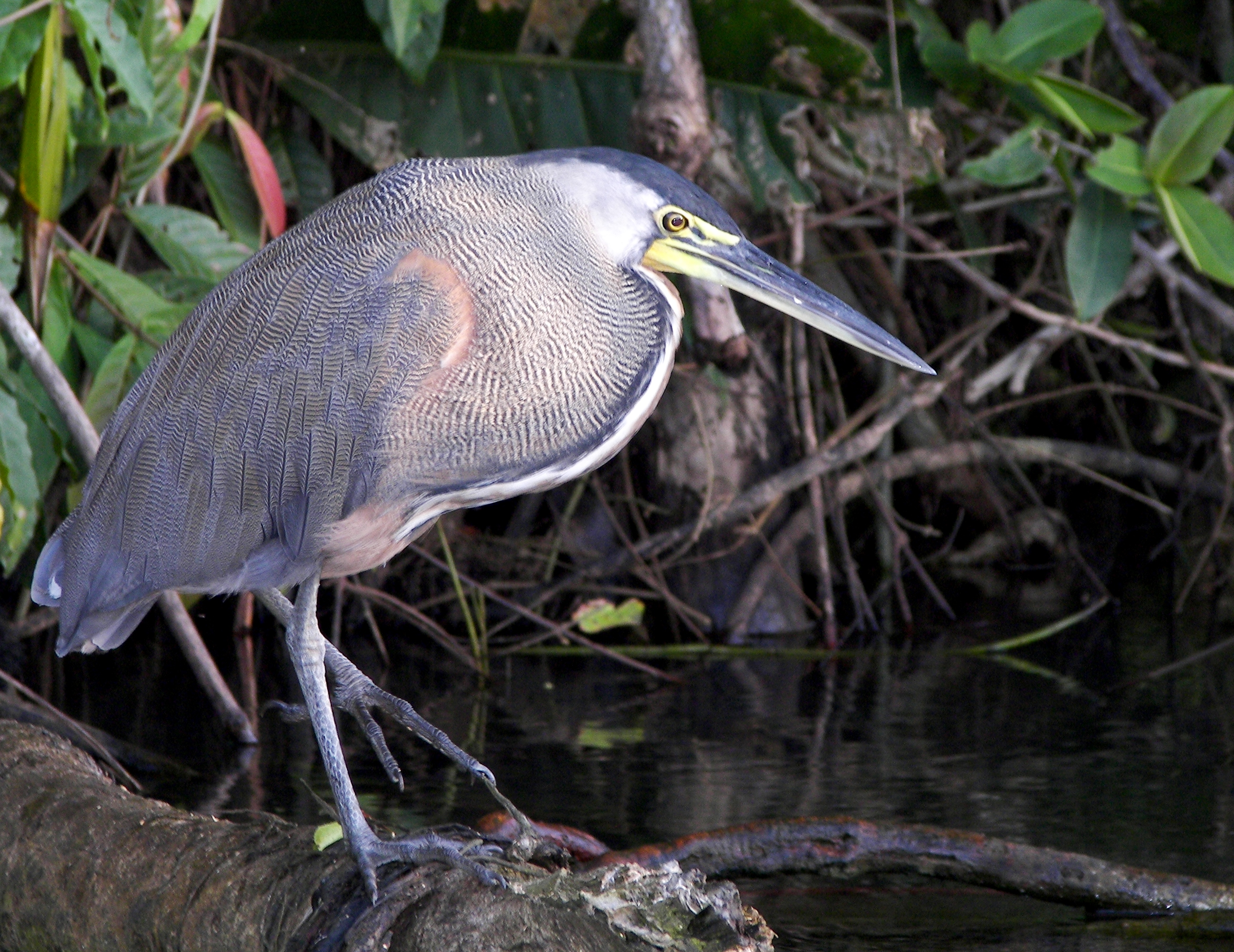
Bare-throated tiger heron in Tortuguero National Park.

The park's wildlife consists of birds, mammals, fungi, ferns, marine life, sea turtles, lakes and rainforest. Tortuguero National Park acts as a refuge to many of these species which are also found in the La Selva Biological Station and Braulio Carrillo National Park. Threatened animals species in the reserve area are: the American crocodile (Crocodylus acutus), Baird's tapir (Tapirus bairdii), marine turtles such as Chelonia mydas and Dermochelys coriacea, the manatee or sea cow (Trichechus manatus) (the northeastern Caribbean wetland is its local feeding and reproduction area) and the tropical gar (Atractosteus tropicus) a living fossil brought under protection by Costa Rican legislation. The park is a breeding ground along the Caribbean coast of Costa Rica for many of the main fishes used in subsistence fishing.

=== Fauna ===
The coastal zone, which has a long beach extending to nearly 22 miles (35 km), is the nesting ground for turtles popularly known as the "beach-nesting turtles (tortugas)". They are found on the beaches, and also many of these species are reported from the canal banks. The main species to lay eggs during the winter months of February to July are: hawksbill, loggerheads, green, and leatherbacks.

The rivers are home to sensitive populations of manatees, as well as caimans, crocodiles, and tropical gar. The forests are home to at least four Costa Rican cat species: jaguars (Panthera onca), ocelot (Leopardus pardalis), jaguarundi (Herpailurus yagouaroundi) and puma (Puma concolor), and three of Costa Rica's four species of monkey: Geoffroy's spider monkey, the mantled howler, and the white-headed capuchin. Other mammals include three-toed sloths (Bradypus variegatus), paca (Agouti paca), peccary (Tayassu pecari), tapir (Tapirus bairdii), white-tailed deer (Odocoileus virginianus), armadillo (Dasypus novemcinctus) and

442 species of birds inhabit the area, including kingfishers, toucans, great blue herons and parrots. Neotropical migratory birds fly through this park, a noted bird species which is the crested eagle (Morphnus guianensis), which is the second largest bird of prey. An endangered species is the great green macaw (Ara ambiguus). 134 species of migratory birds have been recorded. The park is a migratory stopover for nearly one million birds annually.

As of 1976, 54 freshwater fish and 84 marine species are recorded for the area. Another source gives 30 species of freshwater fish. Some families of marine and freshwater fish reported are: The Cichlidae, Characidae, Pimelodidae, Carcharhinidae, Centropomidae, and Lutjanidae. Species include the bobo mullet (Joturus pichardi), which breeds in the estuaries but migrates upriver. Other species include eel, the bull shark (Carcharinus leucas), tarpon (Megalops atlanticus), snook (Centropomus parallelus) and tropical gar (Atractosteus tropicus). As of 1995 only a single species of freshwater mollusc had been recovered from the park, a small bivalve identified as either Mytilopsis guianensis or M. sallei, but a minimum of 10 species was estimated in 1995. and a variety of crustaceans are found here. Two important crustaceans are the shrimp Macrobrachium carcinus and M. tenellum which are fished for in and around the park by local inhabitants of the towns surrounding the area.

54 species of amphibians and 110 species of reptiles are known from here. Seven species of land turtles are known from here. Reptiles and amphibians reported are: Caiman crocodilus, Crocodylus acutus, basilisk lizards, Chrysemys spp., Rhinoclemmys spp., poison-dart frogs (Dendrobatidae), and many endemic species of salamanders.

=== Flora ===
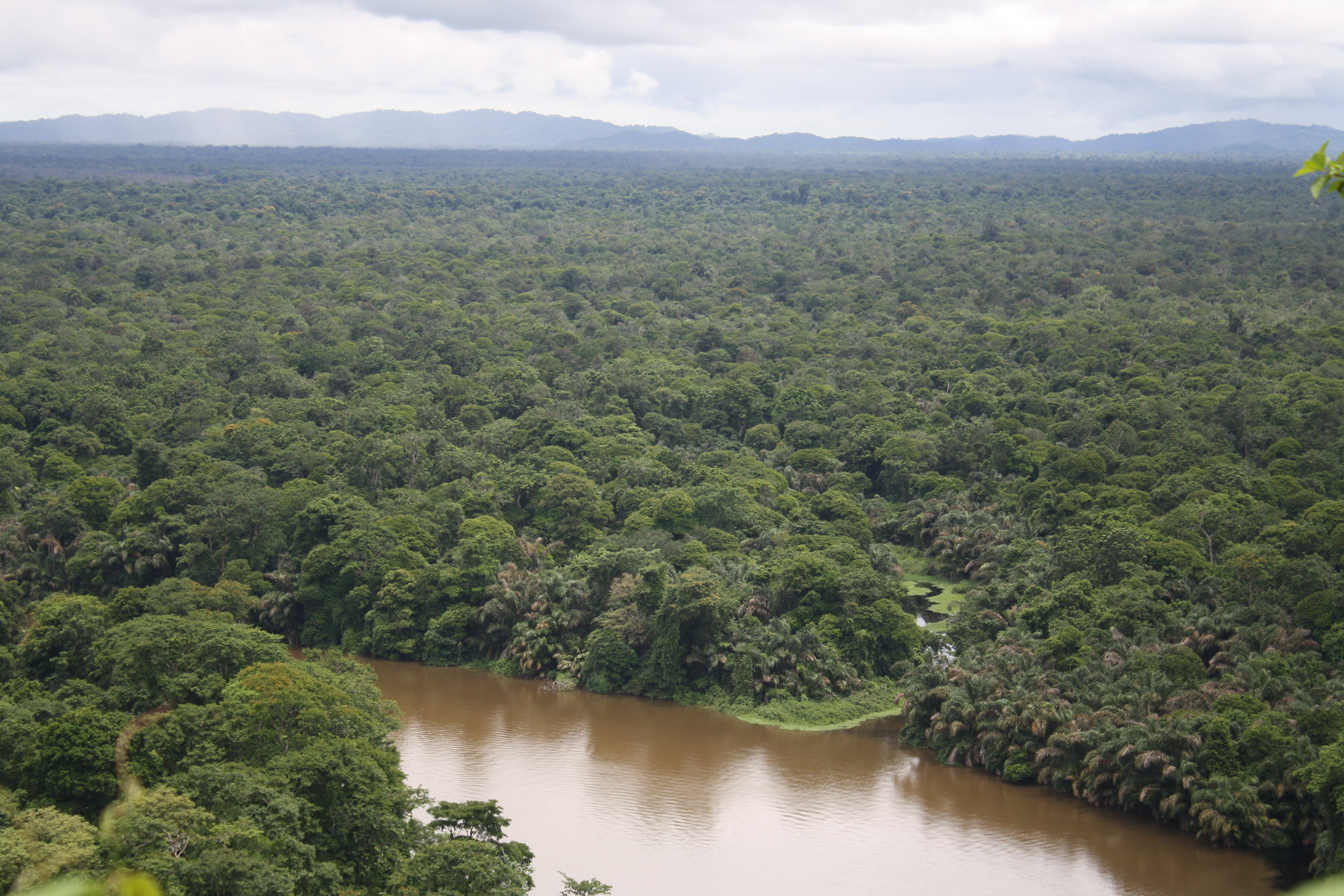
Palm forests in the park

As of 2006, the known flora is represented by 779 species, of which 36 are endemic to the country. According to other sources the national park ecosystem has more than 400 species of trees and about 2,200 species of other plants. The wet lowland Atlantic slopes (mostly below 500 metres (1,600 ft)) of northern Costa Rica, particularly along the coast, form into mangrove forests. The forests in this region consist of the gavilán (Pentaclethra macroloba), caobilla (Carapa nicaraguensis), the almendro (Dipteryx oleifera) and the monkey pot tree (Lecythis ampla); the last two species (regional endemics of the lowlands found below 250 metres (820 ft)) are stated to be nearly endangered. While 99% of mangrove forests are reported from the Pacific Coast of Costa Rica, only 1% is found in the Caribbean part of the park.

Lakes, marshes and floodplains areas in the park have reported palms such as: Raphia taedigera and Manicaria saccifera, and floating aquatic plants in the streams such as the Azolla, Eichhornia, Hydrocotyle and Salvinia, which fully cover the streams during the dry season. There are trees including Dipteryx oleifera, Protium spp., Vatairea spp., Inga spp., Pterocarpus officinalis, Pachira aquatica, Luehea seemannii and Pentaclethra macroloba, with thick and varied undergrowth, and several species of small palms such as Euterpe precatoria. Other important plant species are grasses such as Paspalum spp. and the invasive pasture grass Brachiaria mutica.

Trees native to the forests upland to the southwest are Apeiba tibourbou, Astronium graveolens, Brosimum alicastrum, Carapa guianensis, Cordia alliodora, Crescentia cujete, Croton niveus, Dipteryx oleifera, Ficus insipida, Hura crepitans, Hymenolobium mesoamericanum, Jacaratia spinosa, Lecointea amazonica, Manilkara zapota, Spondias mombin, Virola sebifera and Zigia longifolia.

== Uses ==
Tortuguero National Park is surrounded by private property consisting of large areas under cattle ranching and agricultural farming. The park area itself does not have any permanent human settlement though the settlement was reported during the early part of the twentieth century when timber logging, turtle hunting, and collecting and selling skins of large mammals and reptiles were the major activities. The local inhabitants around the park are only permitted to collect forest products to supplement their income and also for domestic use. Fishing and tourism are major activities. Regulated guidance to visitors to access creeks, lakes, nature trails and watching wildlife and also for observing egg-laying by the turtles Chelonia mydas and Dermochelys coriacea. Training workshops as part of environmental education are organized by the park administration (ACTo) on aspects of conservation measures. Even though no research activities are conducted in the park, several institutions are involved in conducting surveys on sea turtles, birds, flora and insects, land tenure and use, and related economic development, there are some guard stations and protection points built within the park.

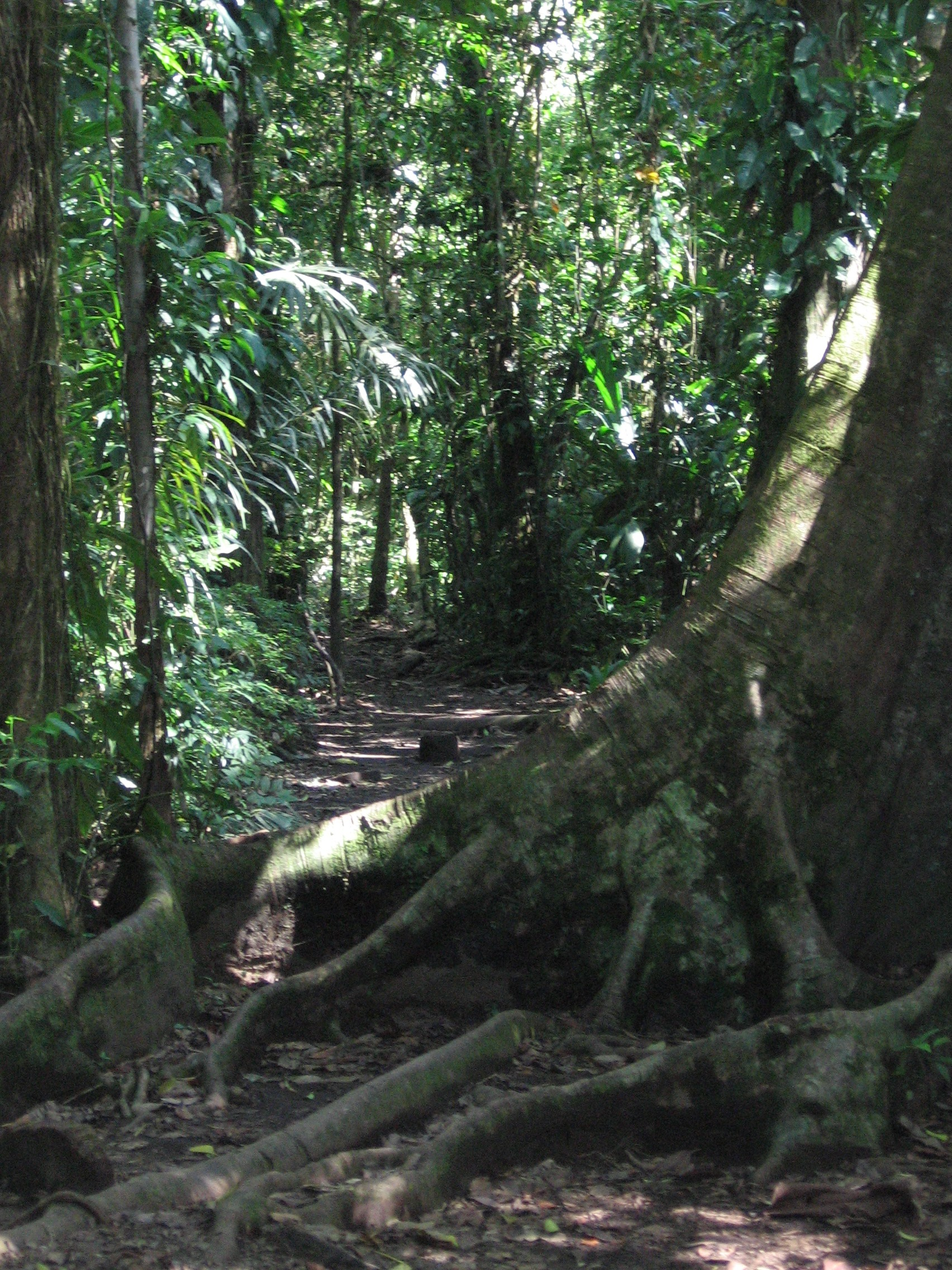
El Gavilan Trail through Tortuguero National Park

Regulations for the public use of the Tortuguero National Park provides an allowance for public visitation under the specific regulations formulated. The park entrance is accessible from the Cuatro Esquinas center in the village of Tortuguero, in the northern part of the park. Several trails depart from this point — three aquatic trails and one hiking trail. The hiking trail is called the Gavilan Trail and is 1,920 metres (6,300 ft) long. La Ceiba and La Bomba trails lead up to Tortuguero hill, to a tower that provides a scenic vista of the region. The Sector Jalova Station is further south near Jalova Lagoon and the town of Parismina. Aguas Frias Station is on the western edge close to the town of Cariari. The three water trails are the Harold which is the most popular, Mora, and Chiquero.

== Conservation ==
Illegal clear-cuts within the park have created access for poachers to the once isolated second-largest green sea turtle nesting beach in the world. Other threats are due to cutting of Manicaria spp. for use as a roofing material, change of river course deforestation, siltation as a result of banana plantations, and illegal hunting by outside agencies. The last named threat is most serious and the most affected species are: Agouti paca, Tayassu pecari, Tapirus bairdii, Odocoileus virginianus, Dasypus novemcinctus and marine turtles and their eggs. Some of the developmental activities reported to be directly affecting the park environment are; a hydroelectric project; the new international port of Barra del Parismina; and an interlinking project linking the canals to the Pacific and the Caribbean.

Conservation measures proposed in the core area of the larger Tortuguero Conservation Area (Area de Conservación y Desarrollo Sostenible de Llanuras del Tortuguero, ACTo), which encompasses the Tortuguero National Park, the Barra del Colorado Wildlife Refuge (40,315 ha), the Border Corridor Wildlife Refuge (11,092 ha), as well as a few other reserves. The National System of Conservation Areas (SINAC), a department of the Ministry for the Environment and Energy (MINAE), is then responsible for managing the project. In 1990–1992, conservation projects were undertaken with the initiative of the project the MINAE and the European Union (EU) and were implemented by IUCN. The project envisaged "the organisation of land use and agroforestry, conservation of aquatic resources, strengthening of social structures, facilitating research development, and protecting existing natural and cultural resources".

== Gallery ==
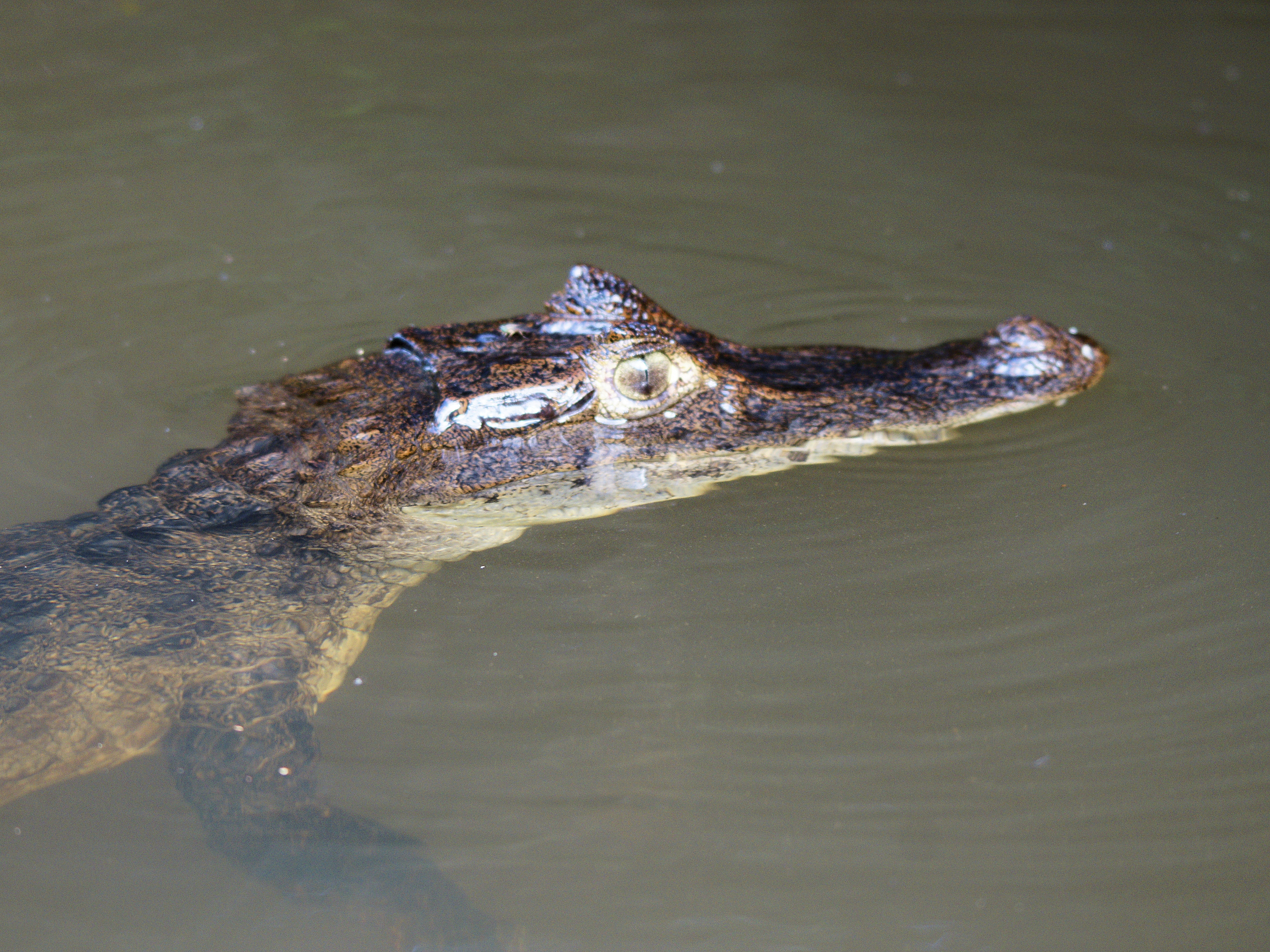
Spectacled caiman in the Tortuguero National Park

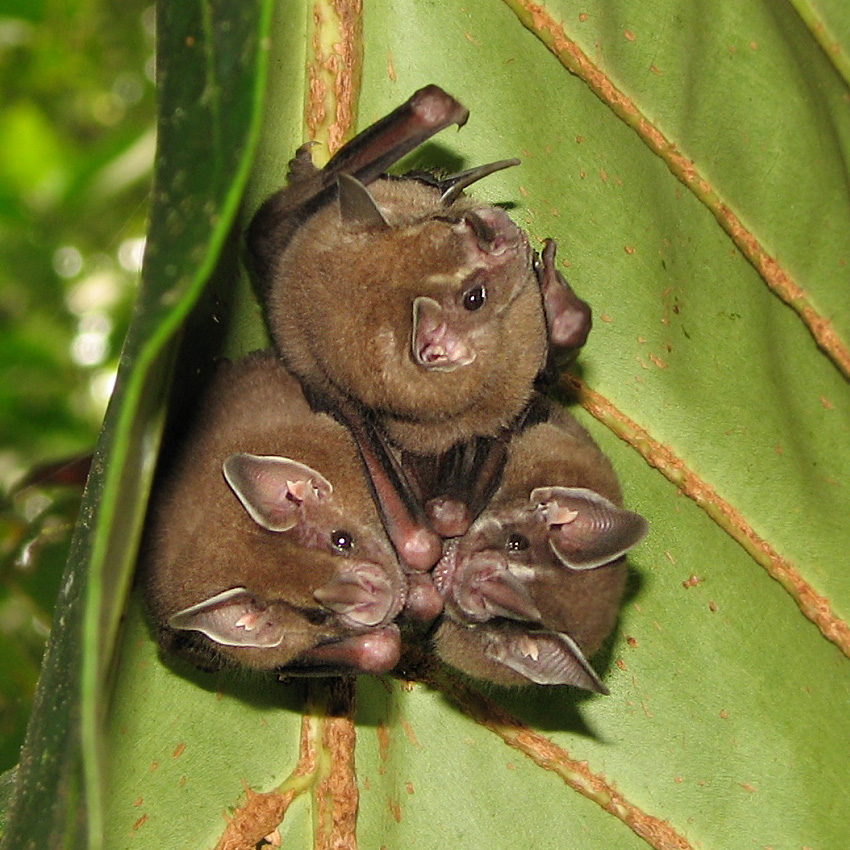
Neotropical fruit bats in Tortuguero National Park

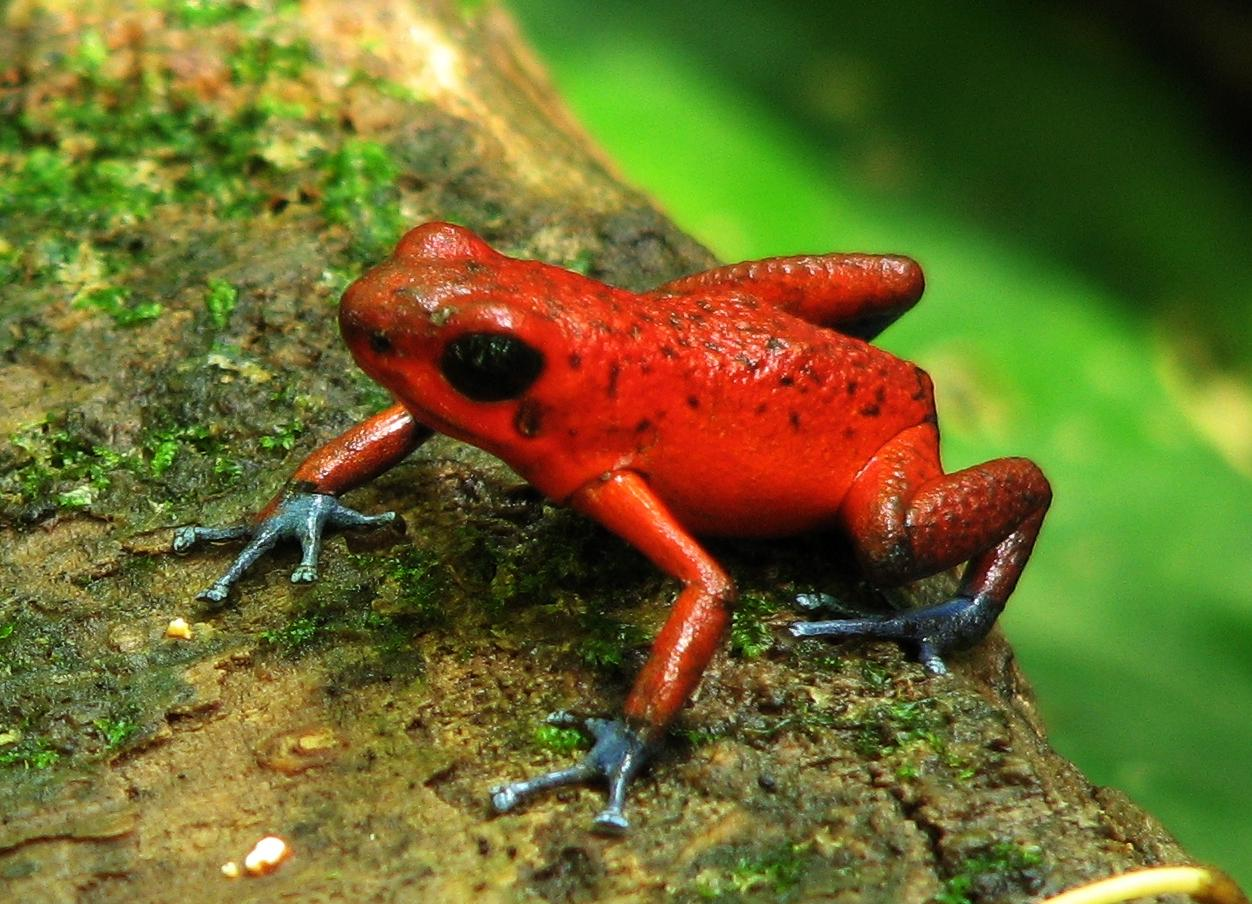
Strawberry poison-dart frog in Tortuguero Volcano
