= Guácimo and Pococí Protected Zone =

Protected area in Costa Rica

- Zona Protectora Guácimo y Pococí
- IUCN category VI (protected area with sustainable use of natural resources)
- Location within Costa Rica
- Location: Costa Rica
- Coordinates: 10.13°N 83.776°W
- Area: 42.62 square kilometres (16.46 sq mi)
- Established: 21 January 1987
- Governing body: National System of Conservation Areas (SINAC)

Guácimo and Pococí Protected Zone (Spanish: Zona Protectora Guácimo y Pococí), is a protected area in Costa Rica, managed under the Tortuguero Conservation Area, it was created in 1987 by executive decree 17390-MAG-S. Located in the Limón Province of northeastern Costa Rica, it protects the recharge area of the Guácimo and Pococí rivers.
