= Dr. Archie Carr Wildlife Refuge =

Wildlife refuge in Costa Rica

- IUCN category IV (habitat/species management area)
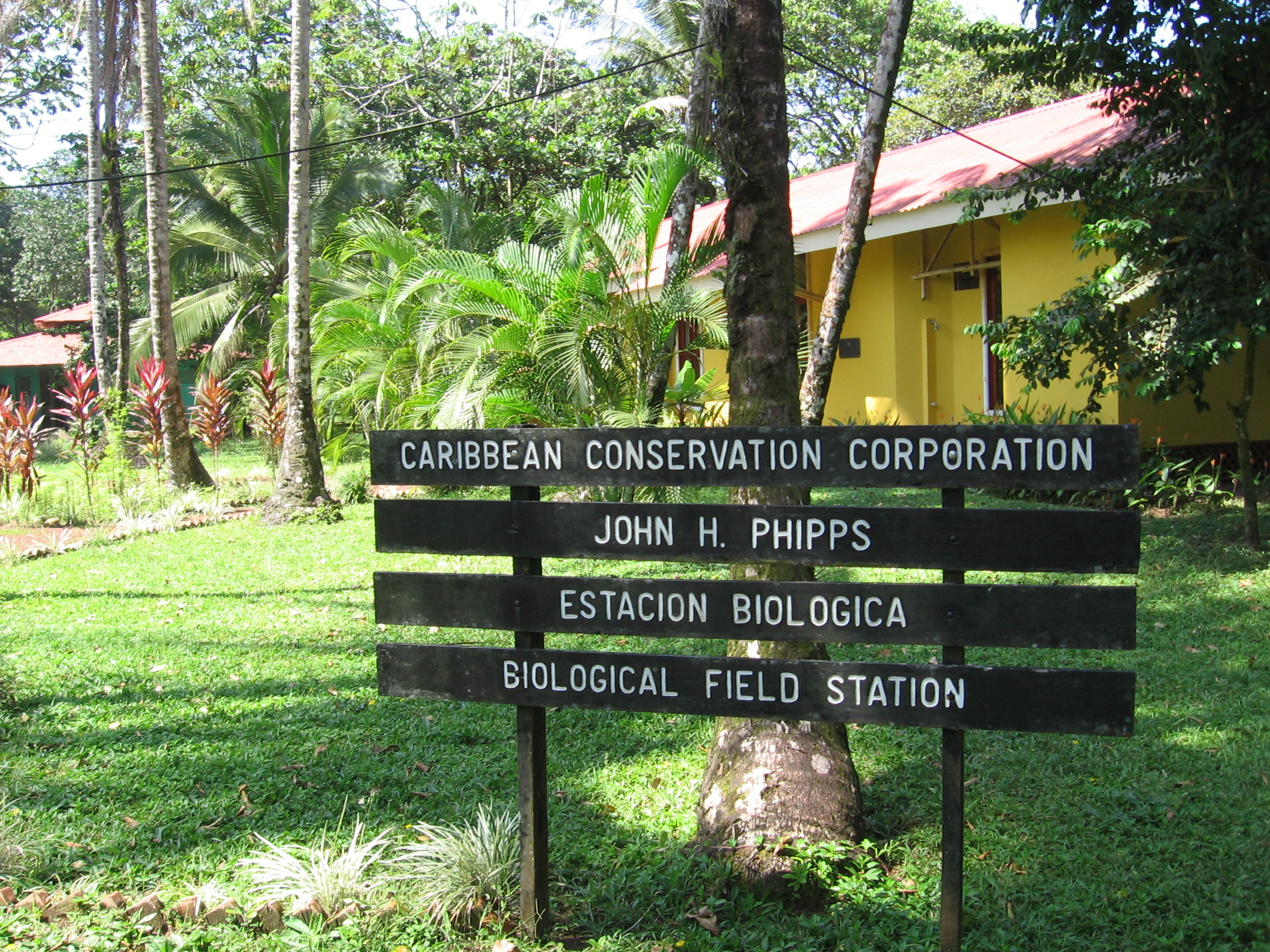

- Location within Costa Rica
- Location: Limón Province, Costa Rica
- Nearest city: Tortuguero
- Coordinates: 10.5776°N 83.5184°W
- Area: 109 acres (0.44 km^{2})
- Established: 1994
- Governing body: National System of Conservation Areas (SINAC)

Dr. Archie Carr Wildlife Refuge is a wildlife refuge located within the Tortuguero Conservation Area, in the Limón Province of northeastern Costa Rica. The refuge is located north of the village of Tortuguero, between the Barra del Colorado Wildlife Refuge and the Tortuguero National Park. It is named after Dr. Archie Carr, who set up the Caribbean Conservation Corporation in the same area in 1955.

The refuge is located on the Caribbean shore, and is the site of the John H. Phipps Biological Station, which operates a sea turtle-tagging program among other research activities on its beaches, as well as the Casa Verde Visitor Center.
