= Tortuguero Conservation Area =

Conservation area in Costa Rica

Tortugero Conservation Area
- Área de Conservación Tortuguero
- Location of the area, labeled ACTo in the northeast of the country.
- Location: Limón Province, Costa Rica
- Coordinates: 10.4°N 83.5°W
- Governing body: National System of Conservation Areas (SINAC)
- Website: Tortuguero Conservation Area

Tortuguero Conservation Area is an administrative area which is managed by SINAC for the purposes of conservation in Limón Province, northeastern Costa Rica.

It contains a national park, several wildlife refuges and protected zones.

== Protected areas ==
- Barra del Colorado Wildlife Refuge
- Border Corridor Wildlife Refuge
- Cariari National Wetlands
- Dr. Archie Carr Wildlife Refuge
- Guácimo and Pococí Protected Zone
- Tortuguero National Park
- Tortuguero Protected Zone
