= Barra del Colorado Wildlife Refuge =

Protected area in Costa Rica

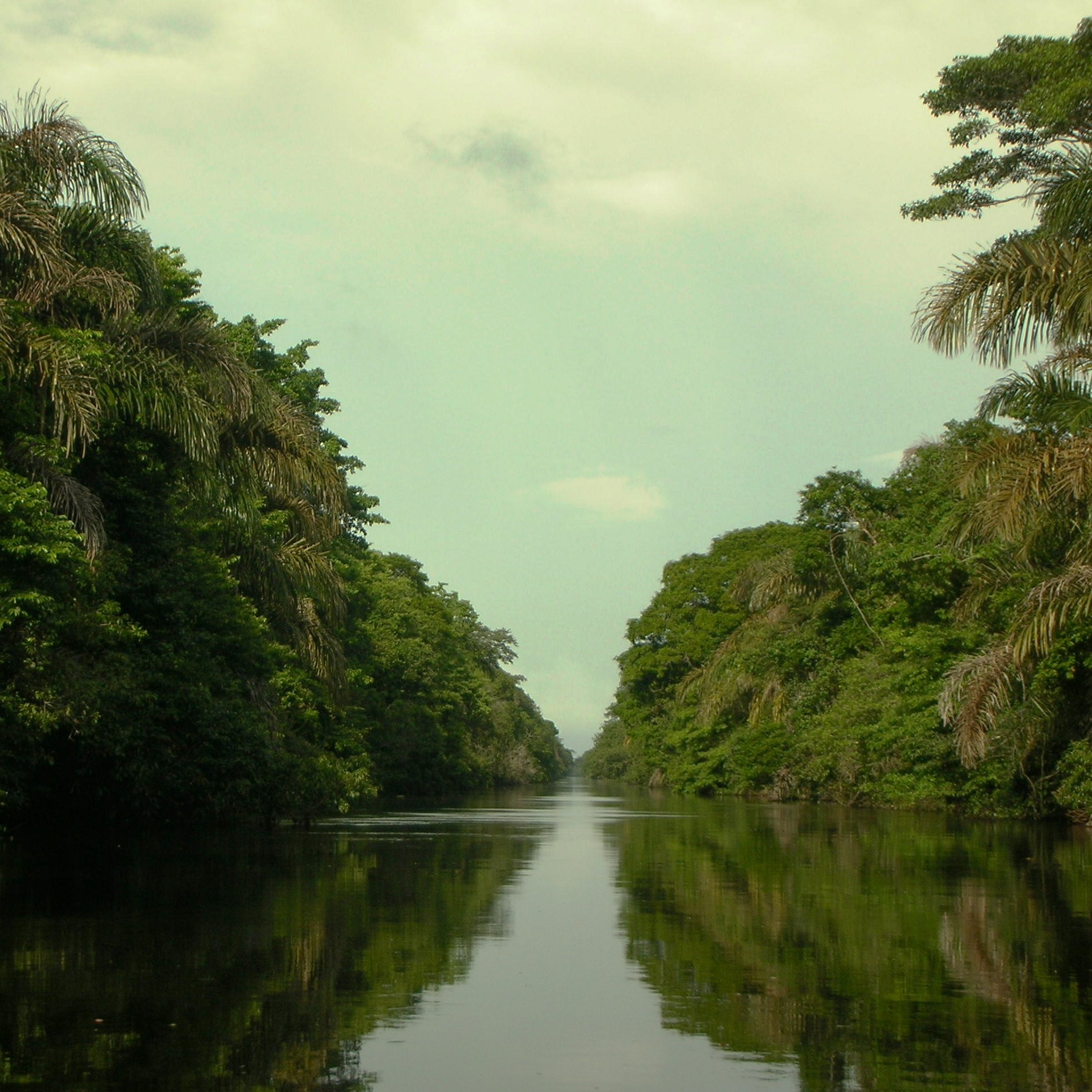

- Location within Costa Rica
- Location: Costa Rica
- Coordinates: 10°46′18″N 83°35′56″W
- Area: 81,177 hectares (200,590 acres)
- Established: 1985
- Governing body: National System of Conservation Areas (SINAC)

Barra del Colorado Wildlife Refuge is a wildlife refuge, part of the Tortuguero Conservation Area, in Limón Province in the northeastern part of Costa Rica. It was created in 1985 and covers an area of 81,177 hectares (200,590 acres). The inactive Tortuguero Volcano lies on the area's southeast edge. The area is located 99 kilometres (62 mi) from San José and is the second most extensive continental protected wild area in the country. Its vegetation cover is grouped into three main types—palm-dominated swamp forest known as yolillal (Raphia taedigera), gamalotal grassland and flooded forest—while the refuge also encompasses coastal areas, lagoons, rivers and herbaceous swamps. It is bounded in part by the San Juan and Colorado rivers, and is located to the south the Tortuguero National Park.

The Barra del Colorado Wildlife Refuge protected has a hot and humid climate with no dry season, and is the habitat of the endangered West Indian manatee as well as many caymans, crocodiles, and fish. It is also home to a variety of tapirs, jaguars, cougars, monkeys, ocelots, and other mammals. Birds found include osprey, toucans, cormorants, herons, hawks, and many more.

The village of Tortuguero, from which the neighbouring Tortuguero National Park received its name, is located on the southern border the refuge, and contains two research stations.
