= Tortuguero Volcano =

Inactive volcano of Costa Rica

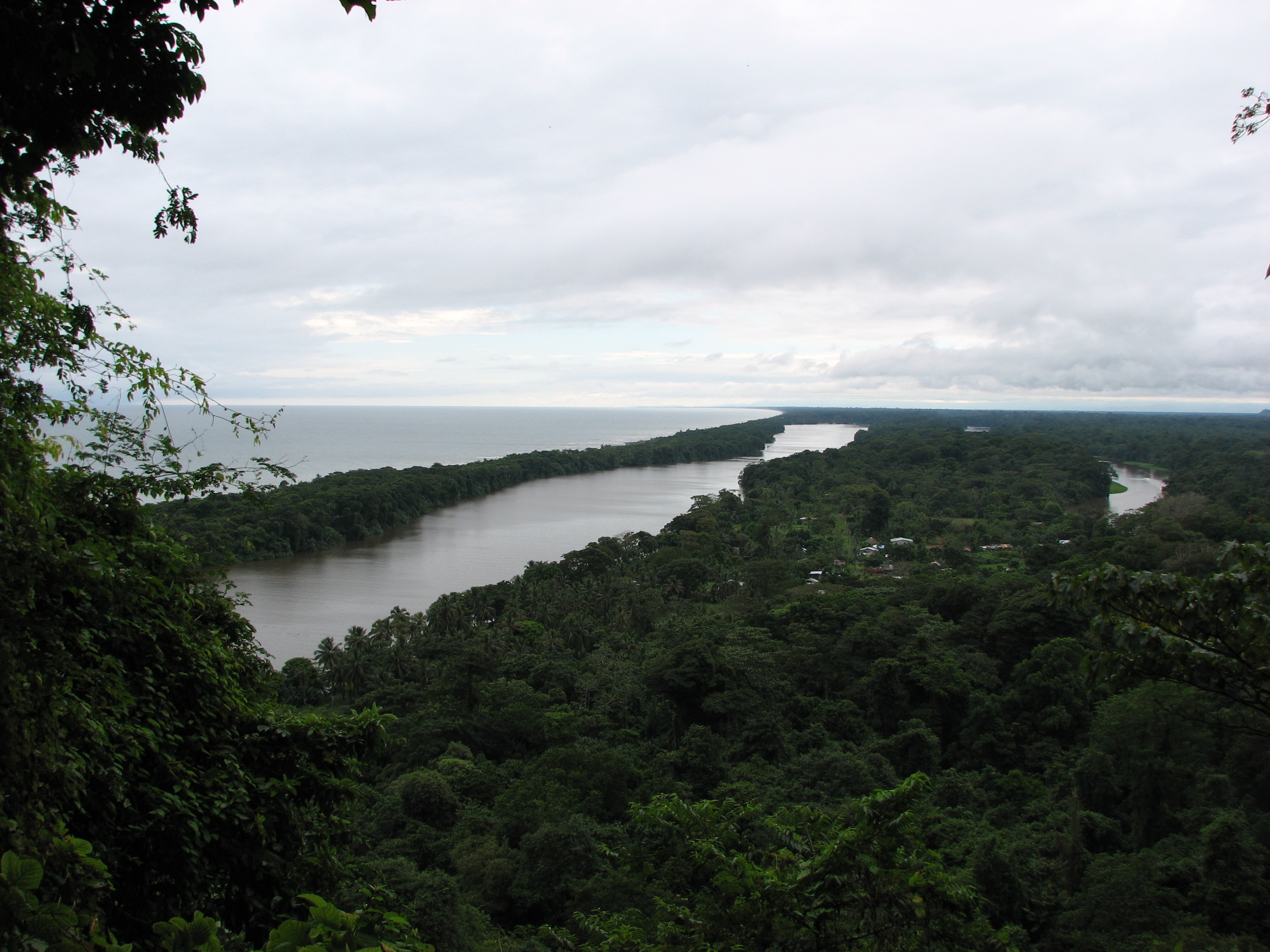
- View towards the southeast from Tortuguero Volcano

Highest point
- Elevation: 119 metres (390 ft)
- Coordinates: 10°35′04″N 83°31′40″W

Geography
- Location within Costa Rica

Geology
- Mountain type: Volcano
- Volcanic arc: Central America Volcanic Arc
- Last eruption: Unknown

Tortuguero Volcano, also known as Tortuguero Hill (Spanish: Cerro Tortuguero), is an extinct volcano located 5.5 kilometres (3.4 mi) WNW from Tortuguero, Costa Rica.

== Toponymy ==
It shares its name, which means "many turtles", with the town and the Tortuguero National Park.

== Physical aspects ==
Pyroclastic cone, one of its sides was cut when the nearby canals were created.

== Social and economic activity ==
The volcano can be seen from the touristic areas of Tortuguero.

== See also ==
- List of volcanoes in Costa Rica
