= Cariari National Wetlands =

Nature reserve in Limón Province, Costa Rica

- Location within Costa Rica
- Location: Limón Province, Costa Rica
- Nearest city: Limón
- Coordinates: 10.191°N 83.25°W
- Area: 2,020 acres (8.2 km^{2})
- Established: 1994
- Governing body: National System of Conservation Areas (SINAC)

Cariari National Wetlands is a nature reserve, part of both the Tortuguero and Caribbean La Amistad Conservation Areas, in the Limón Province of northeastern Costa Rica. It protects mangrove swamps and marine areas on the Caribbean coast. It covers all of the coast from the Tortuguero National Park to the Pacuare Matina Forest Reserve.
