= Tortuguero River =

Coordinates: 10°35′03″N 83°31′23″W

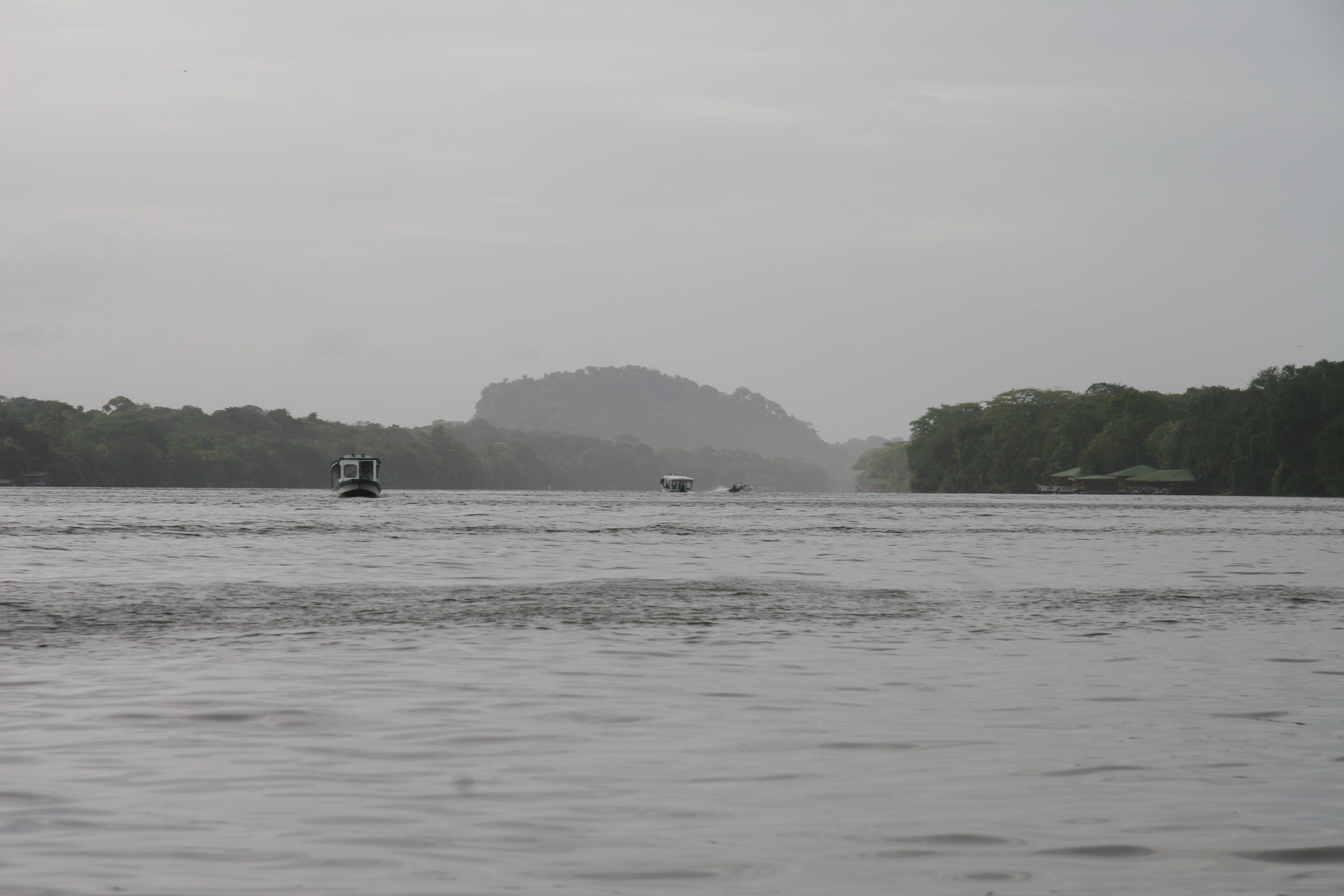
- The Tortuguero River near its mouth
- Native name: (Spanish pronunciation: [toɾˈtuɣeɾo])

Location
- Country: Costa Rica

Physical characteristics
- Mouth: Caribbean Sea
  - location: Northeast Costa Rica

Tortuguero River (Spanish pronunciation: [toɾˈtuɣeɾo]) is a river of Costa Rica. It flows into the Caribbean Sea, near the northeast corner of the country.
