= Colorado River (Costa Rica) =

River in Costa Rica

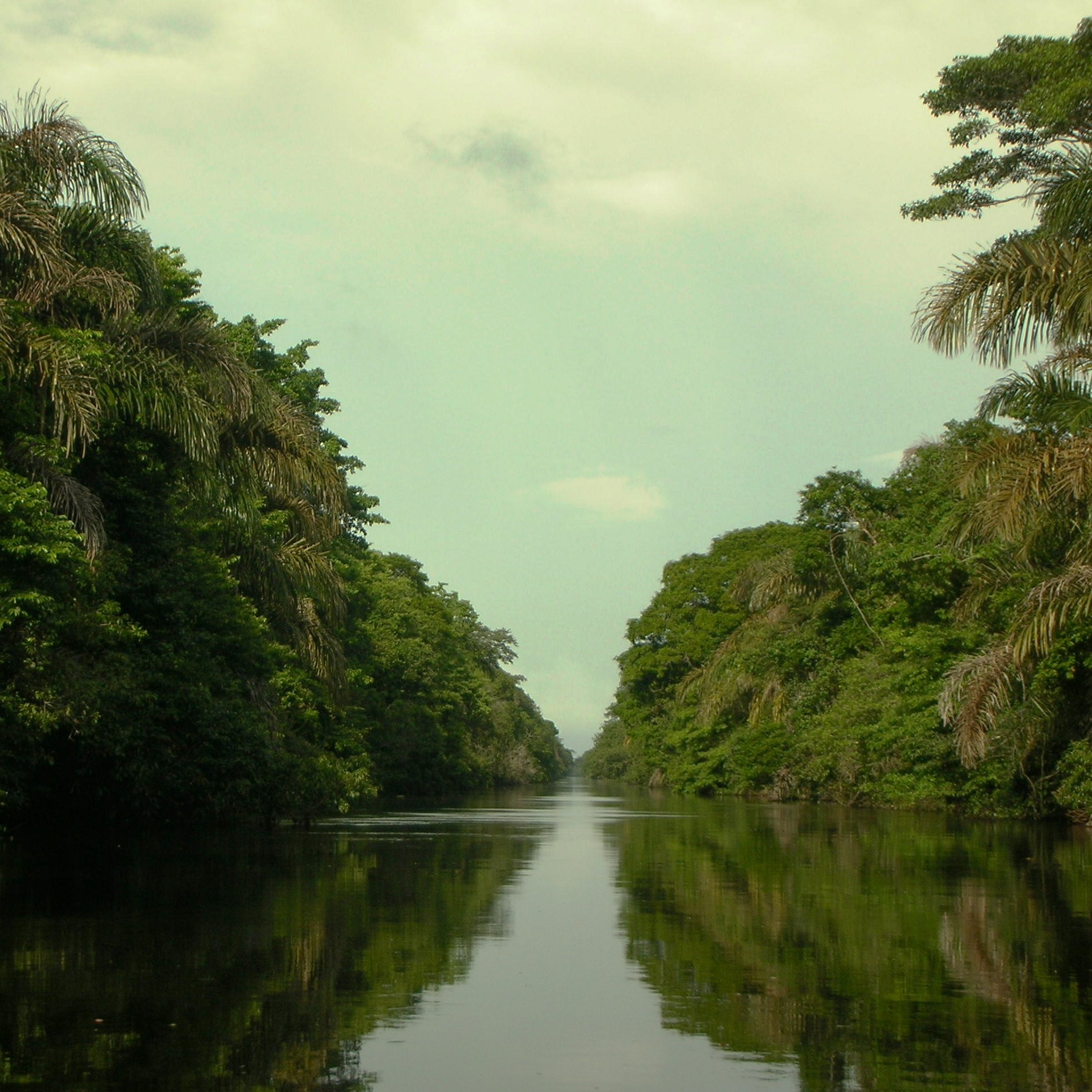
Waterway leading into Barra del Colorado, Costa Rica

The Colorado River, or the Rio Colorado (Spanish pronunciation: [ˈri.o koloˈɾaðo]), in Costa Rica is a distributary of the San Juan River which flows 96 kilometres (60 mi) towards the Caribbean in the northern parts of Heredia and Limón Provinces. The surrounding habitats are protected as part of the second largest rain forest preserve in the country, the Barra del Colorado Wildlife Refuge.

The river is a well known tourist destination, particularly for fishing for tarpon and snook. The Colorado River is considered one of the best places in the world to catch Atlantic tarpon.
