= Tortuguero, Costa Rica =

Village in Limón, Costa Rica

Coordinates: 10°32.5′N 83°30.2′W

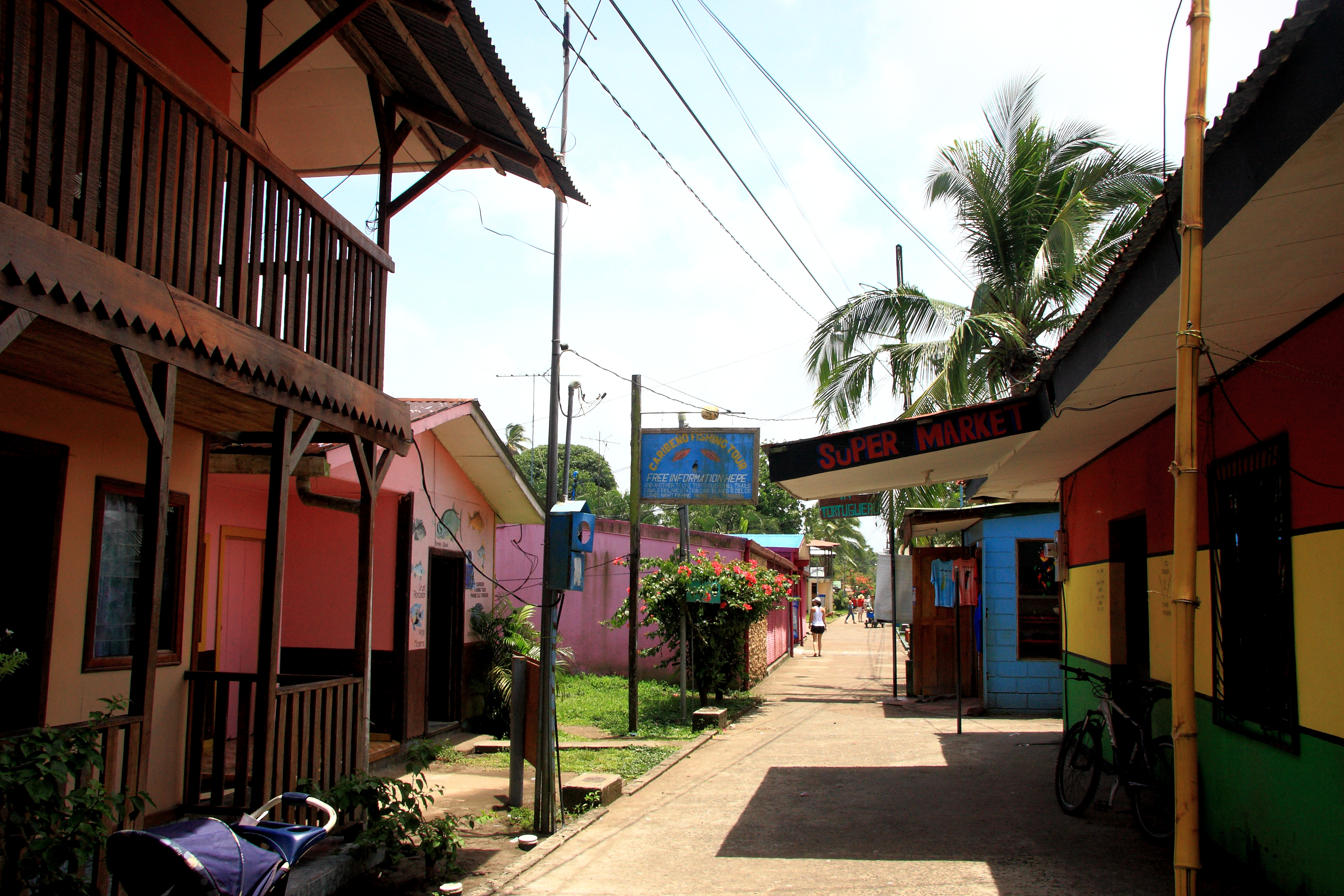
Tortuguero village

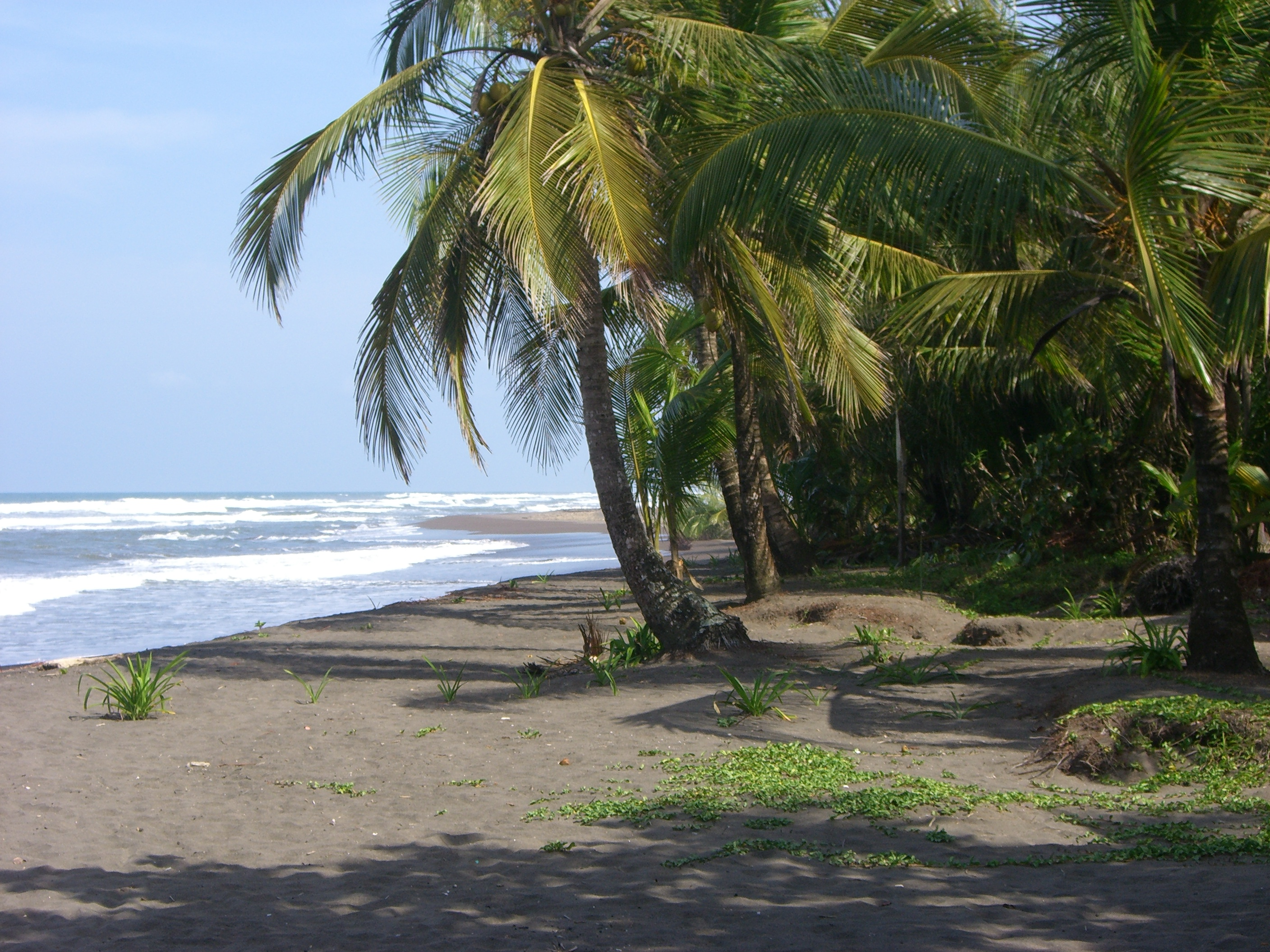
Caribbean Sea Beach at Tortuguero

Tortuguero is a village on the Northern Caribbean coast of Costa Rica in the Limón Province. The small village, which can be reached only by boat or airplane, is sustained almost entirely by eco-tourism. The population is estimated at around 1200-1500. Tortuguero can be translated as Land of Turtles, and gave its name to the neighboring Tortuguero National Park. The village is situated on a sand bar island, separated from the mainland by Tortuguero River and bordering the Caribbean Sea. Tortuguero is renowned for its navigable canals that run through the rainforest in the national park, and has such earned the nickname of 'Central America's Amazon'.

The beaches around Tortuguero are key nesting sites for four species of sea turtle, including two critically endangered species. The National Park is also host to an incredible biodiversity of insects, resident and migratory birds, and mammals, including jaguars and four species of monkeys. Accordingly, there are four biological stations — the John H. Phipps Biological Field Station, the Caño Palma Biological Research Station, the ASVO station (Asociación de Voluntarios para Servicio en Areas Protegidas) and the GVI Jalova Biological Station — which operate from the area immediately around the village and concentrate on research and conservation of the local ecology, particularly the turtles. The ocean here can be dangerous to swim in due to rough surf and strong currents.

== Transport ==
Tortuguero is only accessible by boat or plane.

=== Air travel ===
There is a small airstrip which serves daily flights from Sansa Airlines via San José. Charter flights are also available with Nature Air or Sansa Airlines.

=== Canals and boat navigation ===
Some of the canals were built by the woodworking industry around the decade of the 1940s. These were later improved by the ideas of the engineer Rogelio Pardo Jochs, to whom the canals owe their current name.

These improvements were made in the 1970s. Today the canals connect several lagoons, rivers and streams and allow boat navigation from Moín, near Limón city. Boat transportation is available via La Pavona to the north or Moín to the south.

== Sightseeing ==
During September and October many local "guides" will offer tourists the opportunity to "help" turtle nests hatch. Be aware though, It is not allowed to dig up nest or touch the turtles, not even for the local guides. The only people allowed to interact with the hatchlings are the scientists from the STC (Sea Turtle Conservancy). When you are looking for hatchlings, or when you encounter them, please do not use white lights and camera's with flash, since it disorientates the turtles.

The canals of Tortuguero gave the town its nickname of "Costa Rica's Amazon", and are a fantastic opportunity to see wildlife. Many guided boat tours leave Tortuguero and the surrounding lodges to see the wildlife, jungle, and canals.

Cerro Tortuguero has been officially closed by the National Park and National Reserve service due to overuse and habitat destruction. Many local guides will still offer tours. For hikers, Cerro Tortuguero is a small hill roughly 6 km north of the village, accessible only by boat. It's only 119 m high, but offers good views of the area.

== Climate ==
Tortuguero has a very wet tropical rainforest climate (Af) with heavy to very heavy rainfall year-round.

Climate data for Tortuguero
Month	Jan	Feb	Mar	Apr	May	Jun	Jul	Aug	Sep	Oct	Nov	Dec	Year
Mean daily maximum °C (°F)	29.9 (85.8)	30.3 (86.5)	31.6 (88.9)	31.8 (89.2)	31.5 (88.7)	30.5 (86.9)	30.5 (86.9)	30.2 (86.4)	30.3 (86.5)	30.1 (86.2)	29.2 (84.6)	29.2 (84.6)	30.4 (86.8)
Daily mean °C (°F)	25.6 (78.1)	26.0 (78.8)	27.1 (80.8)	27.6 (81.7)	27.4 (81.3)	26.5 (79.7)	26.7 (80.1)	26.4 (79.5)	26.1 (79.0)	25.9 (78.6)	25.4 (77.7)	25.3 (77.5)	26.3 (79.4)
Mean daily minimum °C (°F)	21.4 (70.5)	21.7 (71.1)	22.7 (72.9)	23.5 (74.3)	23.3 (73.9)	22.5 (72.5)	23.0 (73.4)	22.6 (72.7)	21.9 (71.4)	21.7 (71.1)	21.6 (70.9)	21.4 (70.5)	22.3 (72.1)
Average rainfall mm (inches)	418 (16.5)	256 (10.1)	189 (7.4)	253 (10.0)	328 (12.9)	394 (15.5)	606 (23.9)	440 (17.3)	278 (10.9)	374 (14.7)	606 (23.9)	632 (24.9)	4,774 (188)
Source: Climate-Data.org
