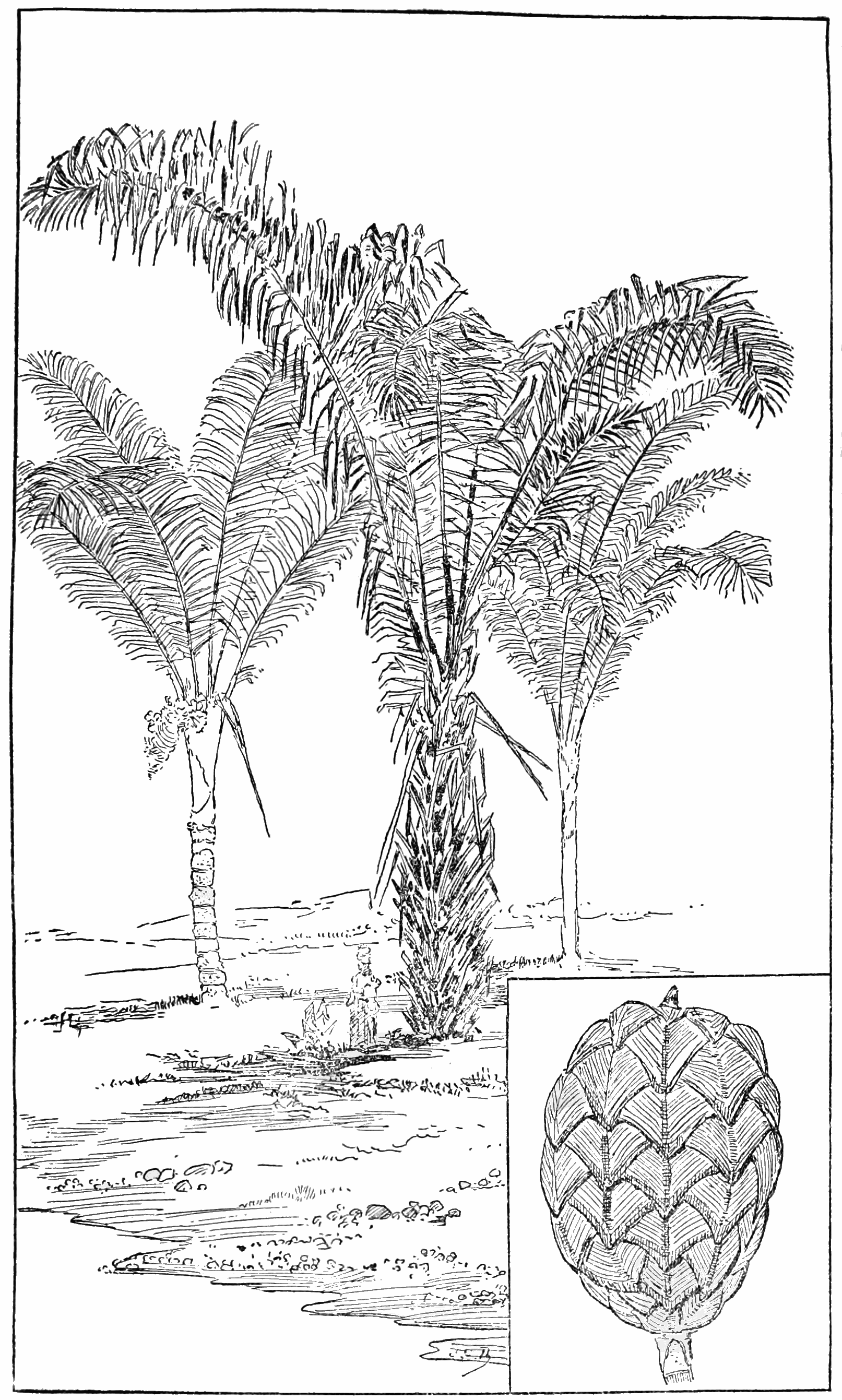

Scientific classification
- Kingdom: Plantae
- Clade: Embryophytes
- Clade: Tracheophytes
- Clade: Angiosperms
- Clade: Monocots
- Clade: Commelinids
- Order: Arecales
- Family: Arecaceae
- Genus: Raphia
- Species: R. taedigera

Binomial name
- Raphia taedigera (Mart.) Mart.

Synonyms
- Metroxylon taedigerum (Mart.) Spreng.; Raphia aulacolepis Burret; Raphia nicaraguensis Oerst.; Raphia vinifera var. nicaraguensis (Oerst.) Drude; Raphia vinifera var. taedigera (Mart.) Drude; Sagus taedigera Mart.

= Raphia taedigera =

Species of palm

Raphia taedigera is a palm species in the family Arecaceae, colloquially known as yolilla in Central American Spanish. It is naturally found in Central America (Nicaragua, Costa Rica), South America (north Brazil and Colombia) and naturalised in parts of Western Africa.
