= Belén District =

Belén District may refer to:

- Peru
  - Belén District, Maynas, in Maynas province, Loreto region
  - Belén District, Sucre, in Sucre province, Ayacucho region
- Costa Rica
  - Belén District, Carrillo, in Carrillo Canton, Guanacaste province
  - Belén de Nosarita District, in Nicoya Canton, Guanacaste province
- Turkey
  - Belen, Hatay, a municipality and district in Hatay Province, south-central Turkey
