= Sámara =

District in Nicoya canton, Guanacaste province, Costa Rica

- District
- Sámara district
- Sámara district location in Costa Rica
- Coordinates: 9.9116035°N 85.5497267°W
- Country: Costa Rica
- Province: Guanacaste
- Canton: Nicoya
- Creation: 26 November 1971

Area
  - Total: 109.19 km^{2} (42.16 sq mi)
- Elevation: 3 m (9.8 ft)

Population (2011)
  - Total: 3,512
  - Density: 32.16/km^{2} (83.30/sq mi)
- Time zone: UTC−06:00
- Postal code: 50205

Sámara is a district of the Nicoya canton, in the Guanacaste province of Costa Rica.

== History ==
Sámara was established on 26 November, 1971 by Decreto Ejecutivo 2075-G. It was split from Nicoya.

== Geography ==
Sámara has an area of 109.19 km^{2} and an elevation of 3 metres.

== Demographics ==
Historical population
Census	Pop.	±% p.a.
1973	2,317	—
1984	1,979	−1.42%
2000	2,603	+1.73%
2011	3,512	+2.76%
2022	3,536	+0.06%
Source: Instituto Nacional de Estadística y Censos; Centro Centroamericano de Población

For the 2011 census, Sámara had a population of 3,512 inhabitants.

== Villages ==
The administrative center of the district is the town of Sámara.

Other villages in the district are Bajo Escondido, Barco Quebrado, Buenavista, Buenos Aires, Cambutes, Cangrejal, Cantarrana, Chinampas, Esterones, Galilea, Palmar, Panamá, Playa Buena Vista, Primavera, Pueblo Nuevo, Samaria, Santo Domingo, Taranta, Terciopelo, and Torito.

== Transportation ==
=== Road transportation ===
The district is covered by the following road routes:

- National Route 150
- National Route 160
- National Route 934

Sámara is located approximately 35 km from Nicoya, the economic and administrative hub of the region.

The paving of the final 35 km of the drive, Route 150 from Nicoya to Sámara on through to Carrillo was completed in early 2006.

The small Carrillo Airport is about 5 km east of Sámara.
