= Diriá, Costa Rica =

District in Santa Cruz canton, Guanacaste province, Costa Rica

Diriá
- District
- Interactive map of Diriá
- Diriá district location in Costa Rica
- Coordinates: 10.2835612°N 85.5204227°W
- Country: Costa Rica
- Province: Guanacaste
- Canton: Santa Cruz
- Creation: 3 September 1976

Area
  - Total: 66.26 km^{2} (25.58 sq mi)
- Elevation: 40 m (130 ft)

Population (2011)
  - Total: 3,905
  - Density: 58.93/km^{2} (152.6/sq mi)
- Time zone: UTC−06:00
- Postal code: 50307

Diriá is a district of the Santa Cruz canton, in the Guanacaste province of Costa Rica.

== History ==
Diriá was established on 3 September 1976 by Decreto Ejecutivo 6369-G. It was segregated from Bolsón.

== Geography ==
Diriá has an area of 66.26 km^{2} (25.58 sq mi) and an elevation of 40 metres.

== Villages ==
The administrative center of the district is the village of Santa Bárbara.

Other villages in the district are Calle Vieja, Coyolar, Diría, Guaitil, Polvazal, Sequeira, Talolinguita, and Trompillal.

== Demographics ==
Historical population
| Census | Pop. | ±% p.a. |
|---|---|---|
| 1984 | 2,603 | — |
| 2000 | 3,217 | +1.33% |
| 2011 | 3,905 | +1.78% |
| 2022 | 5,148 | +2.54% |
Source: Instituto Nacional de Estadística y Censos; Centro Centroamericano de Población

According to the 2011 census, Diriá had a population of 3,905 inhabitants.

== Transportation ==
=== Road transportation ===
The district is covered by the following road routes:

- National Route 21
- National Route 920
- National Route 931
