= Vecinos (disambiguation) =

Vecinos is a Mexican television series. It may also refer to:

- Vecinos (Colombian TV series)
- Ramón Vecinos (1958–2009), Spanish football player and manager
- Vecinos, Salamanca, Spain, a municipality

== See also ==
- Vecino
- Vecino (surname)
