= National Route 929 (Costa Rica) =

Road in Costa Rica

National Tertiary Route 929
- Ruta nacional terciaria 929

Route information
- Maintained by Ministry of Public Works and Transport
- Length: 13.415 km (8.336 mi)

Major junctions
- West end: Route 906
- East end: Puerto Humo, Tempisque river

Location
- Country: Costa Rica

Highway system
- National Road Network of Costa Rica
← Route 928	→ Route 930

National Tertiary Route 929, or just Route 929 (Spanish: Ruta Nacional Terciaria 929, or Ruta 929) is a National Road Route of Costa Rica, located in the Guanacaste province. It is a road in the Nicoya Peninsula, it starts at Route 906 and ends at Puerto Humo, on the shores of Tempisque river.

== Description ==
Currently a gravel road, this is a small road that connects Route 150 through Route 906 to the Tempisque river. Together with Route 906 it is known as Ruta de la Leche, the Milk Route. The route visits the towns of Pozo de Agua, Puerto Humo and the Tempisque river. In Guanacaste province the route covers Nicoya canton (San Antonio district).

== History ==
In late 2019 a pilot program with a new and cheaper asphalt paving procedure, using recycled materials, was put in place with initial tests over this gravel road.
