= Playa Grande, Costa Rica =

Playa Grande Salinas
- Town
- Location in Costa Rica
- Coordinates: 10°20′20″N 85°50′45″W
- Country: Costa Rica
- Province: Guanacaste
- Canton: Santa Cruz (canton), Costa Rica
- Time zone: UTC-6 (Costa Rica Standard Time)

Playa Grande (Spanish pronunciation: [ˈplaʝa ˈɣɾande], lit. "Big Beach"), also known as Salinas, is a beach community on the Pacific coast of Costa Rica just north of Tamarindo. It is located inside the canton of Santa Cruz in Guanacaste Province. Playa Grande has been part of the Parque Nacional Marino Las Baulas (Las Baulas Marine National Park) since 1990. There are palm trees and vegetation around the beach, which stretches for about 4.5 kilometers (2.8 miles). It is part of the Las Baulas National Marine Park, which was established to protect the nesting grounds of endangered leatherback turtles. Playa Grande is one of the major nesting sites for these turtles, and visitors can witness the nesting and hatching process during the nesting season, which typically occurs from October to March. The main attraction of Playa Grande is its surf breaks. The beach has consistent waves. Playa Grande is an ideal destination for nature lovers, with diverse ecosystems surrounding it. Beyond the beach, you can explore the nearby mangrove forests, take boat tours along the estuaries, or venture into the neighboring national parks, such as Rincon de la Vieja or Santa Rosa, which offer hiking trails, wildlife spotting opportunities, and breathtaking landscapes.

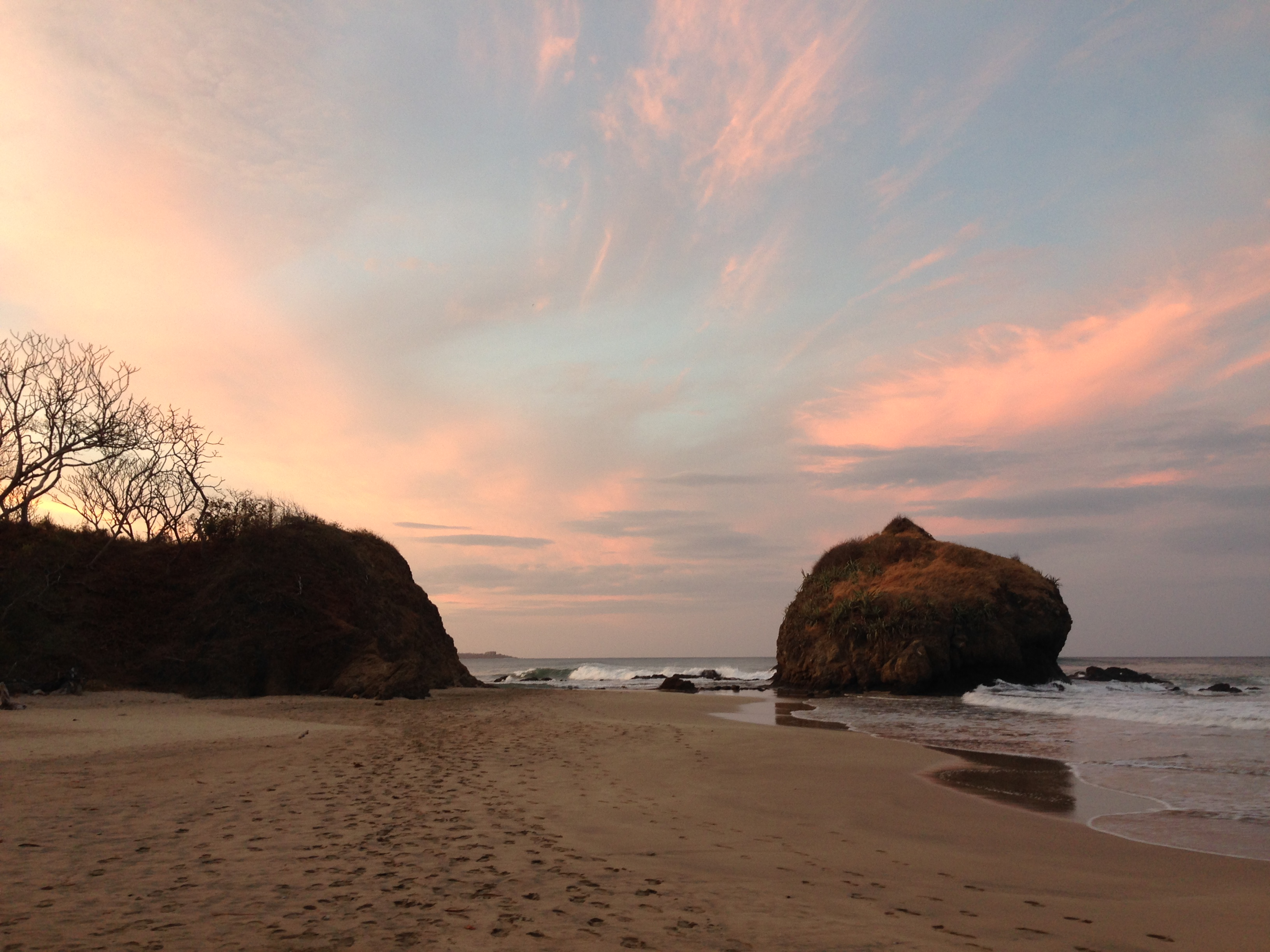
Playa Grande at dawn

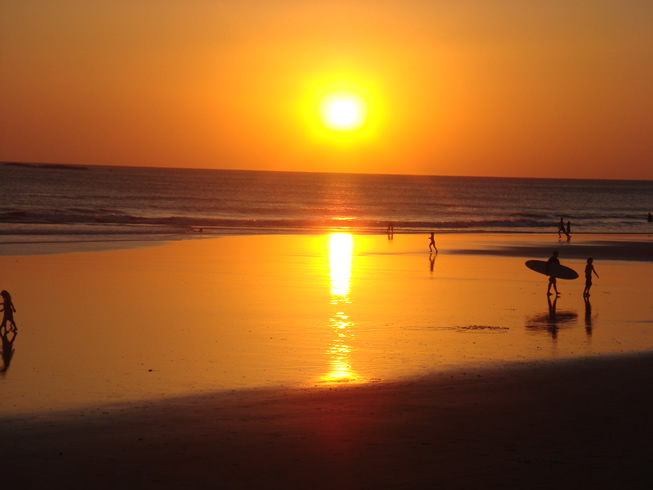
Sunset at Playa Grande

== Geography and Location ==
Playa Grande is located approximately 63 km (39 mi) south of Liberia International Airport and is situated within the Las Baulas National Marine Park, which is dedicated to protecting the nesting grounds of endangered leatherback turtles.

The town is bordered by the Pacific Ocean to the west and is situated between the towns of Tamarindo to the south and Playa Ventanas to the north.

== Las Baulas Marine National Park ==
Las Baulas is Costa Rica's nesting site for the leatherback sea turtle and was created to protect their declining population. The park is home to 117 tree and shrub species and 139 bird species.

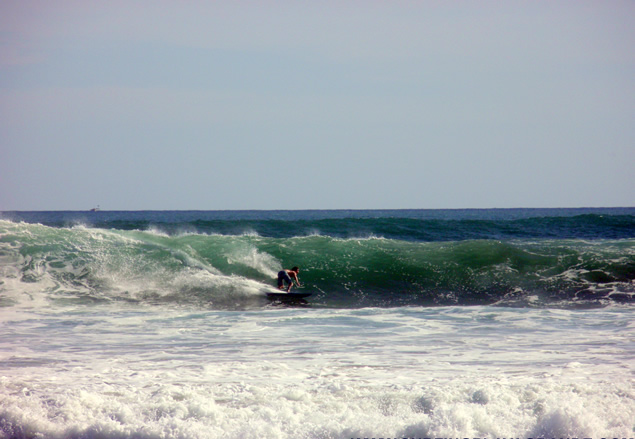
Playa Grande Surf

== Beach ==
Playa Grande beach is known for its sandy bottom and waves. There are several surf breaks from the shore that make the location popular for swimming and surfing.

== In International Pop Culture ==
Playa Grande is featured on a postcard in S4 E18 of "The Office" (U.S.). The episode features Toby's going-away party before he moves to Playa Grande, where he appears various times for the remainder of season 4.
