= Vecino (surname) =

Vecino is a surname. Notable people with the surname include:

- Matías Vecino (born 1991), Uruguayan footballer
- Mercedes Vecino (1916–2004), Spanish actress
- Santiago Vecino (born 1978), Uruguayan illustrator
- Thiago Vecino (born 1999), Uruguayan footballer
- Lara Arruabarrena Vecino (born 1992), Spanish tennis player

== See also ==
- Vecinos (disambiguation)
