= Cartagena District =

District in Santa Cruz canton, Guanacaste province, Costa Rica

Cartagena
- District
- Interactive map of Cartagena
- Cartagena district location in Costa Rica
- Coordinates: 10.3642355°N 85.6809692°W
- Country: Costa Rica
- Province: Guanacaste
- Canton: Santa Cruz
- Creation: 2 October 1964

Area
  - Total: 82.56 km^{2} (31.88 sq mi)
- Elevation: 63 m (207 ft)

Population (2011)
  - Total: 3,824
  - Density: 46.32/km^{2} (120.0/sq mi)
- Time zone: UTC−06:00
- Postal code: 50305

Cartagena is a district of the Santa Cruz canton, in the Guanacaste province of Costa Rica.

== History ==
Cartagena was created on 2 October 1964 by Acuerdo Ejecutivo 405. Segregated from Tempate.

== Geography ==
Cartagena has an area of 82.56 km^{2} (31.88 sq mi) and an elevation of 63 metres.

== Villages ==
Administrative center of the district is the village of Cartagena.

Other villages in the district are Corocitos and Lorena.

== Demographics ==
Historical population
Census	Pop.	±% p.a.
1973	1,967	—
1984	1,935	−0.15%
2000	2,986	+2.75%
2011	3,824	+2.27%
2022	5,683	+3.67%
Source: Instituto Nacional de Estadística y Censos; Centro Centroamericano de Población

For the 2011 census, Cartagena had a population of 3,824 inhabitants.

== Transportation ==
=== Road transportation ===
The district is covered by the following road routes:

- National Route 155
- National Route 910
