= National Route 906 (Costa Rica) =

Road in Costa Rica

National Tertiary Route 906
- Ruta nacional terciaria 906

Route information
- Maintained by Ministry of Public Works and Transport
- Length: 19.860 km (12.340 mi)

Major junctions
- South end: Route 150
- Route 929
- North end: Route 150

Location
- Country: Costa Rica

Highway system
- National Road Network of Costa Rica
← Route 905	→ Route 907

National Tertiary Route 906, or just Route 906 (Spanish: Ruta Nacional Terciaria 906, or Ruta 906) is a National Road Route of Costa Rica, located in the Guanacaste province. It is a road in the Nicoya Peninsula, it starts and ends at Route 150.

== Description ==
Currently a gravel road, Route 906 runs in parallel to Route 150 to the west. Together with Route 929 it is known as Ruta de la Leche, the Milk Route. The route visits the towns of Piave, Corralillo and San Lázaro.

In Guanacaste province the route covers Nicoya canton (San Antonio district).

== History ==
In late 2019 a pilot program with a new and cheaper asphalt paving procedure, using recycled materials, was put in place with initial tests over this gravel road.
