= 2006–07 Primera División (Costa Rica) =

Costa Rican Primera División
- Season: 2006–07
- Champions: Apertura: Saprissa; Clausura: Saprissa
- Relegated: Santacruceña

Primera División de Costa Rica (Costa Rica First Division) is a Costa Rican football tournament composed of two short tournaments that take up the entire year to determine the champion of Costa Rican football.

In both the Apertura and Clausura, 2 groups of 6 teams are conformed, they will play twice (Home and away) with the teams of their own group (10 games) and once game with the teams of the other group (6 games), for a total of 16 games. The top 4 teams from each group after the final round of the Apertura and the Clausura qualify for the playoffs.

== Apertura 2006 ==
=== Group stage ===
Group A
Pos	Team	Pld	W	D	L	GF	GA	GD	Pts	Qualification
1	Alajuelense	16	10	2	4	28	15	+13	32	Qualified to the playoffs
2	Puntarenas F.C.	16	8	3	5	29	19	+10	27	Qualified to the playoffs
3	Herediano	16	6	5	5	21	12	+9	23	Qualified to the playoffs
4	San Carlos	16	5	5	6	17	20	−3	20	Qualified to the playoffs
5	Liberia	16	3	3	10	15	38	−23	12	
6	Santacruceña	16	1	3	12	9	30	−21	6	

Source: RSSSF

Group B
Pos	Team	Pld	W	D	L	GF	GA	GD	Pts	Qualification
1	Saprissa	16	8	5	3	29	17	+12	29	Qualified to the playoffs
2	Pérez Zeledón	16	8	4	4	20	15	+5	28	Qualified to the playoffs
3	Cartaginés	16	7	3	6	22	25	−3	24	Qualified to the playoffs
4	Brujas F.C.	16	8	4	4	20	13	+7	23 (Note: Brujas deducted 5 points for failure to give youth players required playing time.)	Qualified to the playoffs
5	Carmelita	16	4	6	6	21	20	+1	18	
6	Santos	16	4	5	7	15	22	−7	17	

Source: RSSSF

=== Playoffs ===
Quarterfinals
1A	Alajuelense	1	4	5
4B	Brujas F.C.	0	0	0
2B	Pérez Zeledón	0	4	4 (7)
3A	Herediano	3	1	4 (6)
1B	Saprissa	3	1	4
4A	San Carlos	0	2	2
2A	Puntarenas F.C.	1	1	2
3B	Cartaginés	0	0	0

Semifinals
Alajuelense	2	0	2
Pérez Zeledón	0	1	1
Saprissa	0	2	2
Puntarenas F.C.	1	0	1

Finals
Alajuelense	0	0	0
Saprissa	2	2	4

Apertura 2006 winners
Saprissa

== Clausura 2007 ==
=== Group stage ===
Group A
Pos	Team	Pld	W	D	L	GF	GA	GD	Pts	Qualification
1	Saprissa	16	9	5	2	28	12	+16	32	Qualified to the playoffs
2	Puntarenas F.C.	16	8	5	3	23	16	+7	29	Qualified to the playoffs
3	Herediano	16	7	5	4	22	12	+10	26	Qualified to the playoffs
4	San Carlos	16	4	4	8	19	29	−10	16	Qualified to the playoffs
5	Liberia	16	3	5	8	14	22	−8	14	
6	Santacruceña	16	2	4	10	13	28	−15	10	

Source: RSSSF

Group B
Pos	Team	Pld	W	D	L	GF	GA	GD	Pts	Qualification
1	Alajuelense	16	8	6	2	22	14	+8	30	Qualified to the playoffs
2	Cartaginés	16	7	4	5	14	14	0	25	Qualified to the playoffs
3	Pérez Zeledón	16	6	6	4	21	17	+4	24	Qualified to the playoffs
4	Brujas F.C.	16	6	5	5	18	16	+2	23	Qualified to the playoffs
5	Santos	16	6	3	7	24	20	+4	21	
6	Carmelita	16	3	2	11	15	33	−18	11	

Source: RSSSF

=== Playoffs ===
Quarterfinals
1A	Saprissa	0	1	1
4B	Brujas F.C.	0	0	0
2B	Cartagines	3	0	3
3A	Herediano	4	0	4
1B	Alajuelense	3	1	4
4A	San Carlos	0	0	0
2A	Puntarenas F.C.	0	2	2
3B	Perez Zeledon	0	0	0

Semifinals
Saprissa	0	2	2 (4)
Herediano	2	0	2 (2)
Alajuelense	2	1	3
Puntarenas F.C.	2	0	2

Finals
Saprissa	1	3	4
Alajuelense	1	2	3

Clausura 2007 winners
Saprissa

== Final ==
No final was played as Saprissa won both the Apertura and Clausura tournaments.

Primera División de Costa Rica 2006-07
Saprissa
25th title

== Aggregate table ==
Pos	Team	Pld	W	D	L	GF	GA	GD	Pts	Qualification or relegation
1	Alajuelense	32	18	8	6	50	29	+21	62	
2	Saprissa	32	17	10	5	57	29	+28	61	Primera División Champion 2006-07
3	Puntarenas F.C.	32	16	8	8	52	35	+17	56	
4	Pérez Zeledón	32	14	10	8	41	32	+9	52	
5	Herediano	32	13	10	9	43	24	+19	49	
6	Cartaginés	32	14	7	11	36	39	−3	49	
7	Brujas F.C.	32	14	9	9	38	29	+9	51	
8	Santos	32	10	8	14	39	42	−3	38	
9	San Carlos	32	9	9	14	36	49	−13	36	
10	Carmelita	32	7	8	17	36	53	−17	29	
11	Liberia	32	6	8	18	29	60	−31	26	
12	Santacruceña	32	3	7	22	22	58	−36	16	Relegated to Segunda Division

Source: RSSSF
