= Elian Morales =

Costa Rican footballer (born 2000)

Personal information
- Full name: Elian Ariel Morales Traña
- Date of birth: 29 May 2000 (age 26)
- Place of birth: Cuajiniquil, Costa Rica
- Position: Left midfielder

Team information
- Current team: Guadalupe
- Number: 22

Youth career
- AD Cuajiniquil
- –2017: CCDR La Cruz
- 2017–2019: LD Alajuelense

Senior career*
Years	Team	Apps	(Gls)
2019–2020	LD Alajuelense	4	(0)
2020	→ AD Rosario (loan)		
2020–2021	Sporting FC	27	(2)
2021–2022	Guadalupe	15	(0)
2022–2023	San José		
2023–	Guadalupe		
- * Club domestic league appearances and goals as of 21:10, 17 April 2022 (UTC)

Elian Ariel Morales Traña (born 29 May 2000) is a Costa Rican footballer who plays as a left midfielder for Guadalupe

== Club career ==
=== LD Alajuelense ===
Morales is a product of CCDR La Cruz and AD Cuajiniquil. He joined LD Alajuelense at the age of 16 in 2017.

In September 2018, Morales and his teammate, Geancarlo Castro, went on a one-month internship with Argentine club Rosario Central. At the end of December 2018, Morales began training with the clubs first team.

18-year old Morales got his professional debut for the club on 28 February 2019 against C.S. Cartaginés, when he came on as a substitute for Freddy Álvarez in the 91st minute. He made three more appearances for the first team in the following months.

In the following season, he made no official appearances and for that reason, he was one out of eight Alajuelense player, who was loaned out to Costa Rican second division club AD Rosario, or Rosario de Naranjo, in January 2020 for the rest of the season.

=== Sporting FC ===
In July 2020, Morales moved to fellow league club Sporting FC in San José, Costa Rica. Morales made 27 league appearances for the club and scored two goals.

=== Later clubs ===
One year later, on 11 July 2021, Morales signed with Guadalupe. After a year at Guadalupe, Morales departed and joined Costa Rican second division team San José on 26 July 2022. Ahead of the 2023/24 season, he returned to Guadalupe.
