= Quebrada Honda District =

District in Nicoya canton, Guanacaste province, Costa Rica

Quebrada Honda
- District
- Quebrada Honda district
- Quebrada Honda district location in Costa Rica
- Coordinates: 10.189666°N 85.2946165°W
- Country: Costa Rica
- Province: Guanacaste
- Canton: Nicoya
- Creation: 11 July 1967

Area
  - Total: 106.03 km^{2} (40.94 sq mi)
- Elevation: 23 m (75 ft)

Population (2011)
  - Total: 2,523
  - Density: 23.80/km^{2} (61.63/sq mi)
- Time zone: UTC−06:00
- Postal code: 50204

Quebrada Honda is a district of the Nicoya canton, in the Guanacaste province of Costa Rica.

== History ==
Quebrada Honda was created on 11 July 1967 by Decreto 12. Segregated from Mansión.

== Geography ==
Quebrada Honda has an area of 106.03 km^{2} (40.94 sq mi) and an elevation of 23 metres.

== Locations ==
- Barrios: Tortuguero
- Poblados: Botija, Caballito, Embarcadero, Copal, Loma Bonita, Millal, Paraíso, Paso Guabo, Pochote, Puerto Moreno, Roblar, San Juan (part), Sombrero, Sonzapote, Tres Esquinas

== Demographics ==
Historical population
Census	Pop.	±% p.a.
1973	1,964	—
1984	2,140	+0.78%
2000	2,323	+0.51%
2011	2,523	+0.75%
2022	3,264	+2.37%
Source: Instituto Nacional de Estadística y Censos; Centro Centroamericano de Población

For the 2011 census, Quebrada Honda had a population of 2,523 inhabitants.

== Transportation ==
=== Road transportation ===
The district is covered by the following road routes:

- National Route 18
- National Route 907
