= Las Baulas Marine National Park =

Costa Rican protected area

Las Baulas de Guanacaste Marine National Park
- IUCN category II (national park)
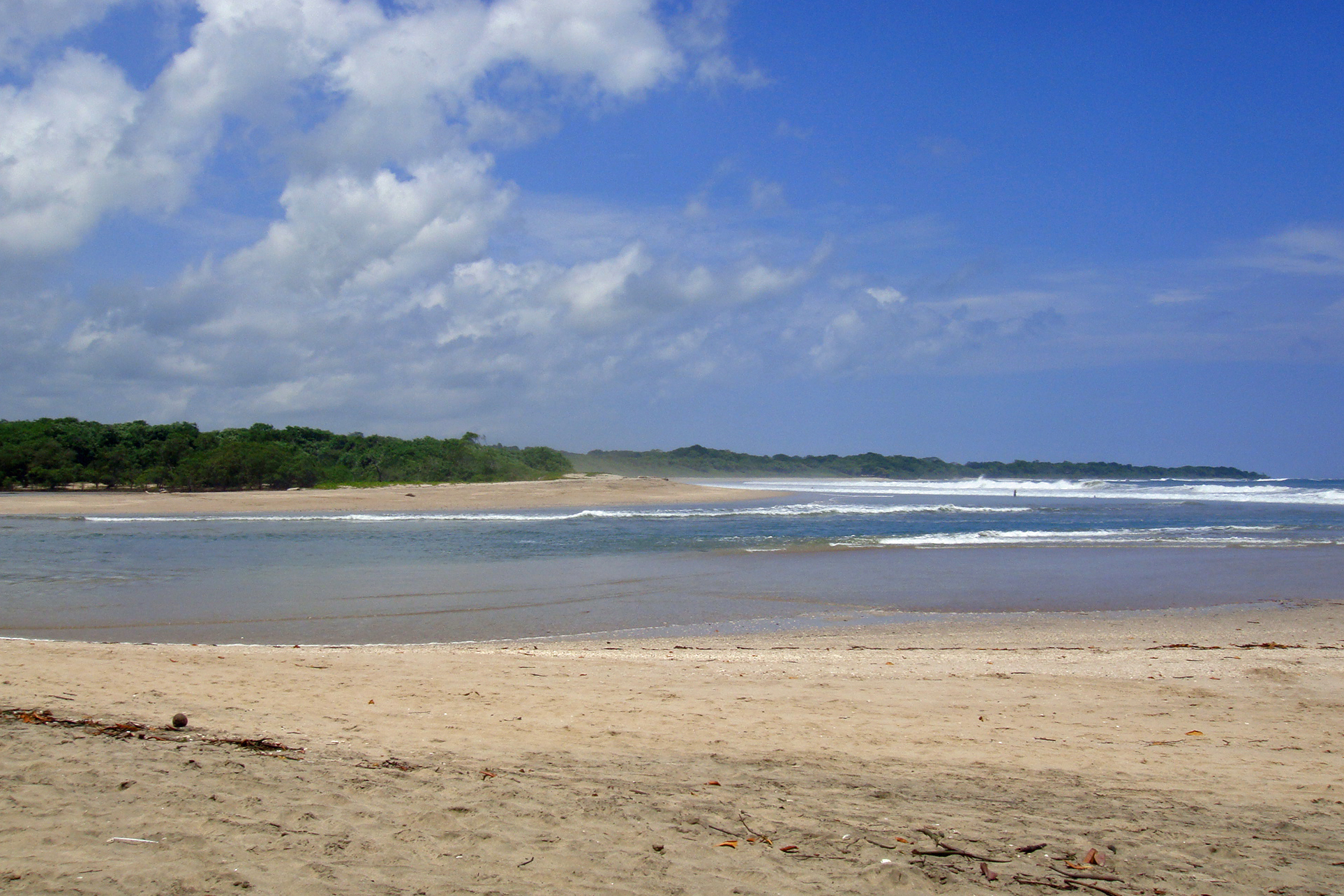
- Playa Grande at Las Baulas park entrance
- Las Baulas Marine National Park area.
- Location: Guanacaste Province, Costa Rica
- Nearest city: Tamarindo
- Coordinates: 10°19′05″N 85°51′54″W
- Area: 7.7 square kilometres (3.0 sq mi) terrestrial 167.3 square kilometres (64.6 sq mi) marine
- Established: 9 July 1991
- Governing body: National System of Conservation Areas (SINAC)
- Website: Marino Las Baulas National Park
- Location in Costa Rica

Ramsar Wetland
- Official name: Tamarindo
- Designated: 9 June 1993
- Reference no.: 610

Las Baulas de Guanacaste Marine National Park (Spanish: Parque Nacional Marino Las Baulas de Guanacaste) is a National Park of Costa Rica and a Ramsar Site. The park is managed by the Tempisque Conservation Area, and covers approximately a 167.3 square kilometres (64.6 sq mi) marine area of the Tamarindo Bay, next to the town of Tamarindo. It supports the largest nesting colony of leatherback sea turtles on the Pacific coast of the Americas. Female leatherbacks often come ashore at Playa Grande (Grande Beach) between October and May to lay their eggs.

More than half the park is underwater and protected but still allows recreation, such as surfing. The park has white-sand beaches and forests. The forests are home to approximately 174 species of birds and many other animals. The National Park covers four beaches (Carbón, Ventanas, Grande and Langosta), as well as the Tamarindo estuary and mangroves at the mouth of the Matapalo River and the San Francisco River Estuary. To the north, the Cerros Morro and Hermosa are also included.

The Tamarindo estuary Ramsar site which was previously designated as the Tamarindo Wildlife Refuge (Spanish: Refugio de Vida Silvestre Tamarindo) is now located in this national park.

== Gallery ==
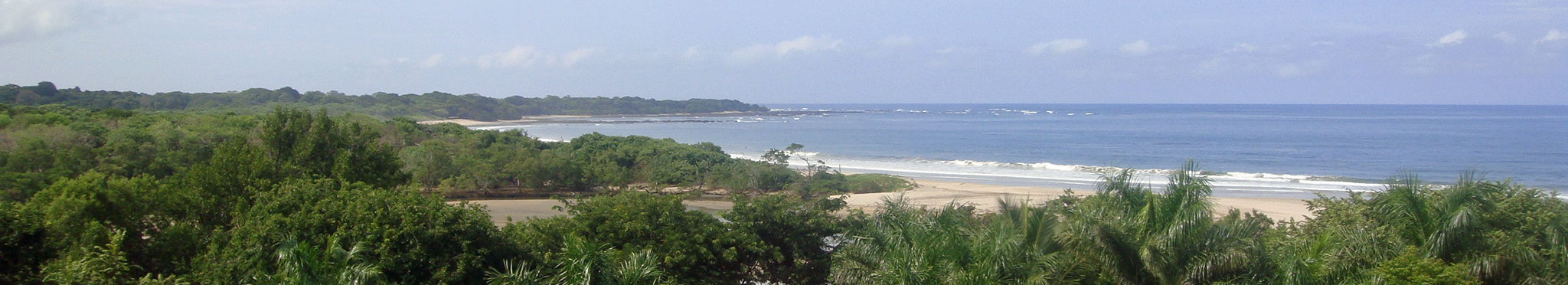
Panoramic view of Las Baulas National Park.

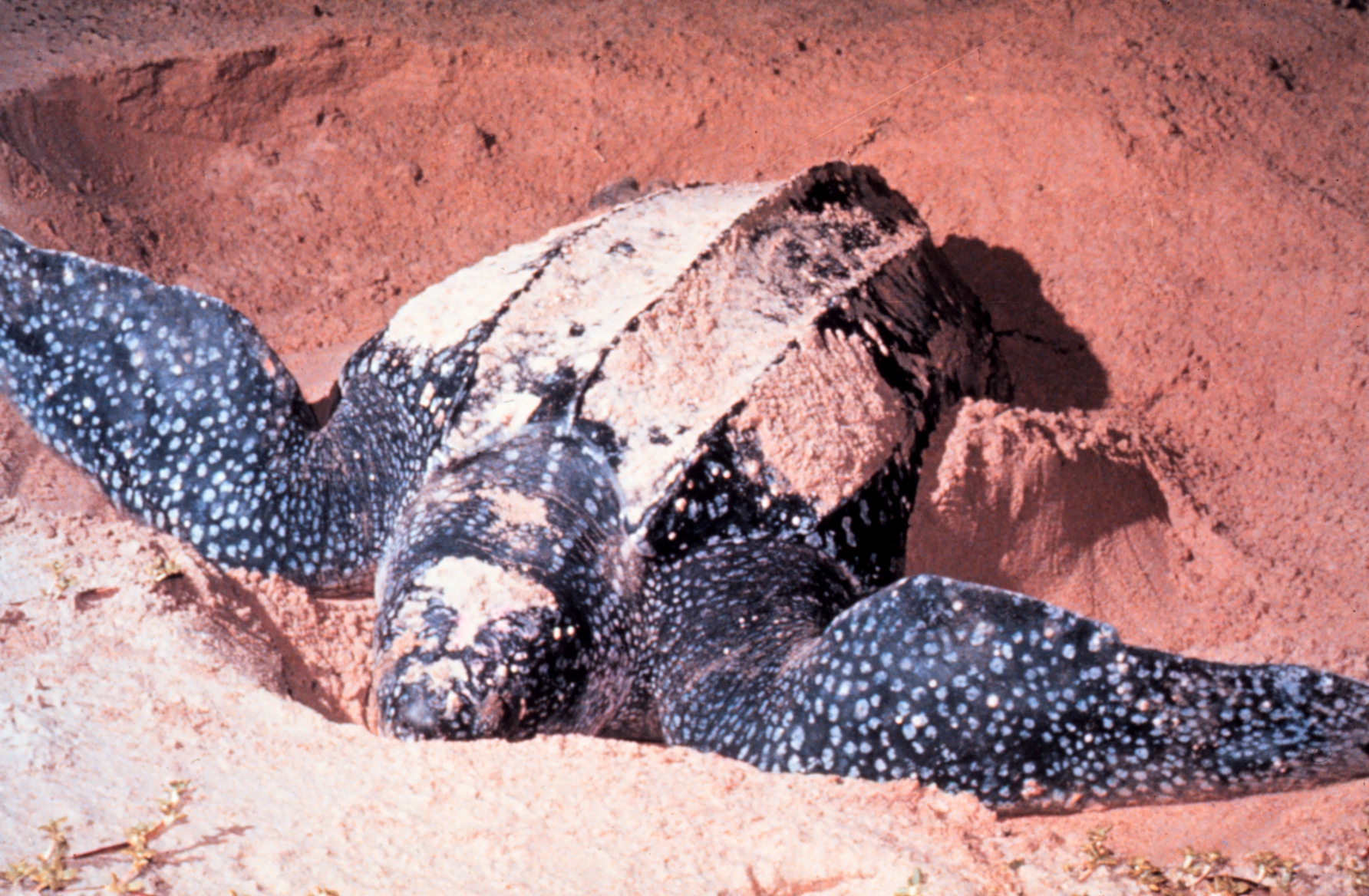
Nesting a leatherback turtle.

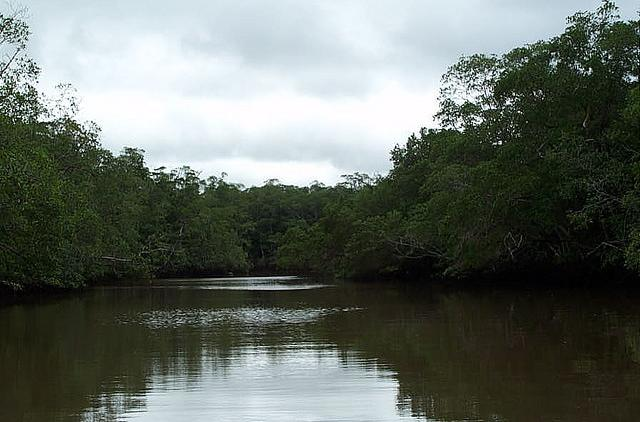
Tamarindo Estuary.

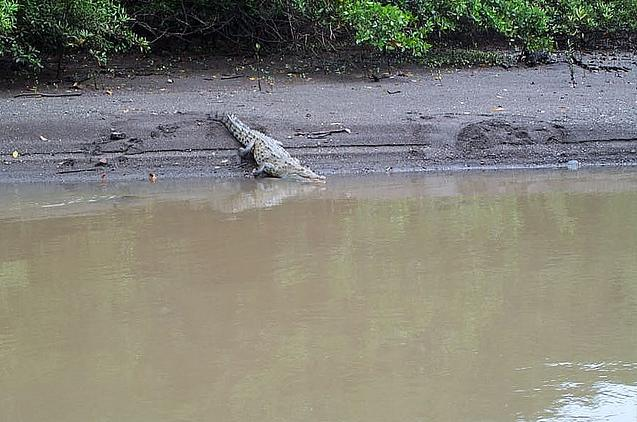
American crocodile in the River Matapalo.

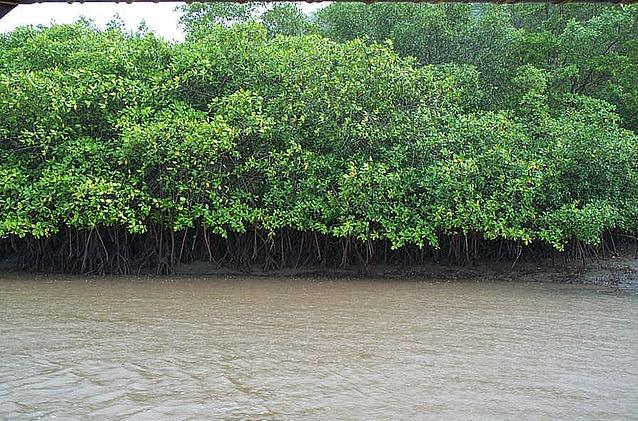
Mangrove of Tamarindo estuary.

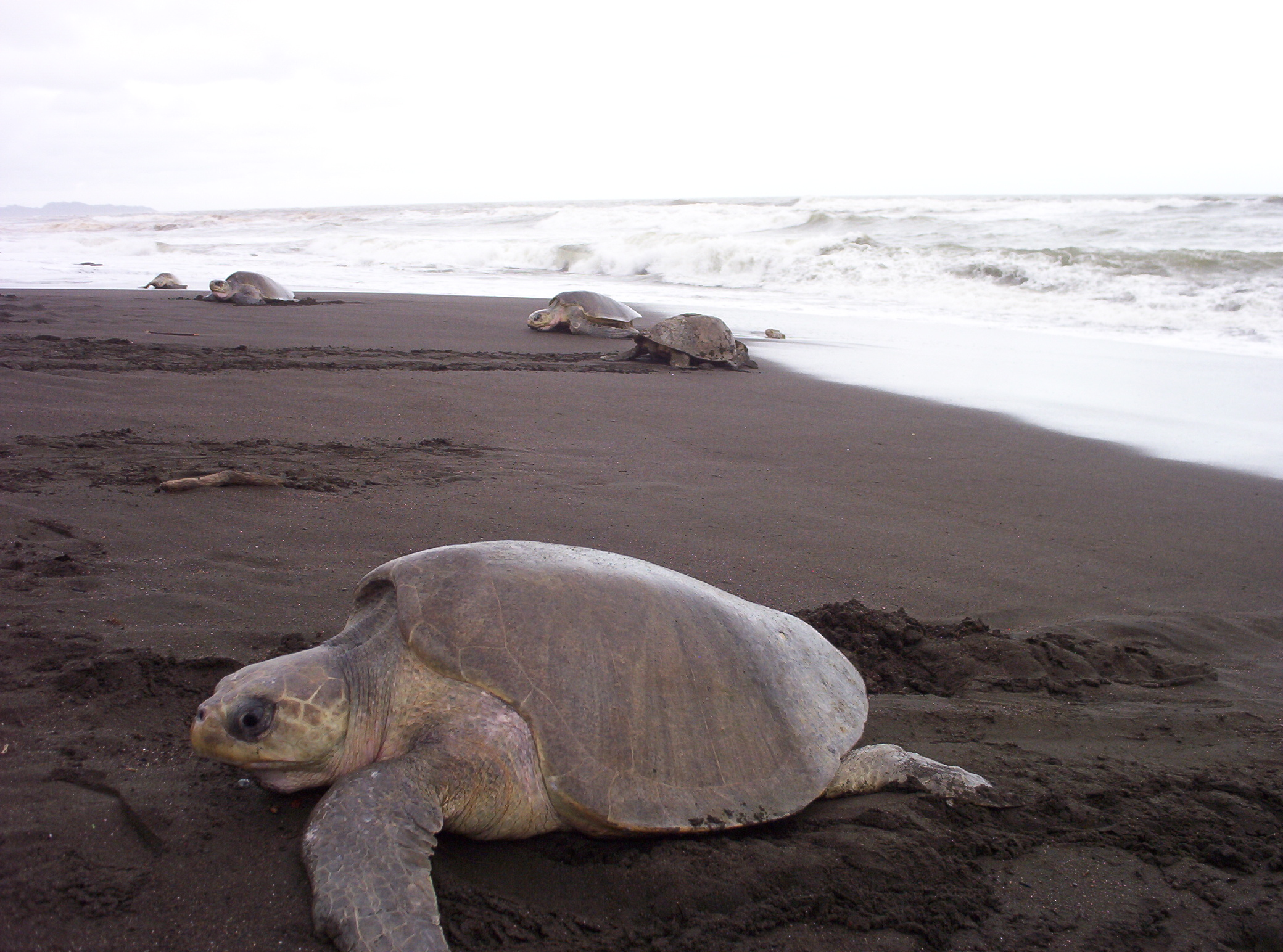
Olive ridley sea turtle

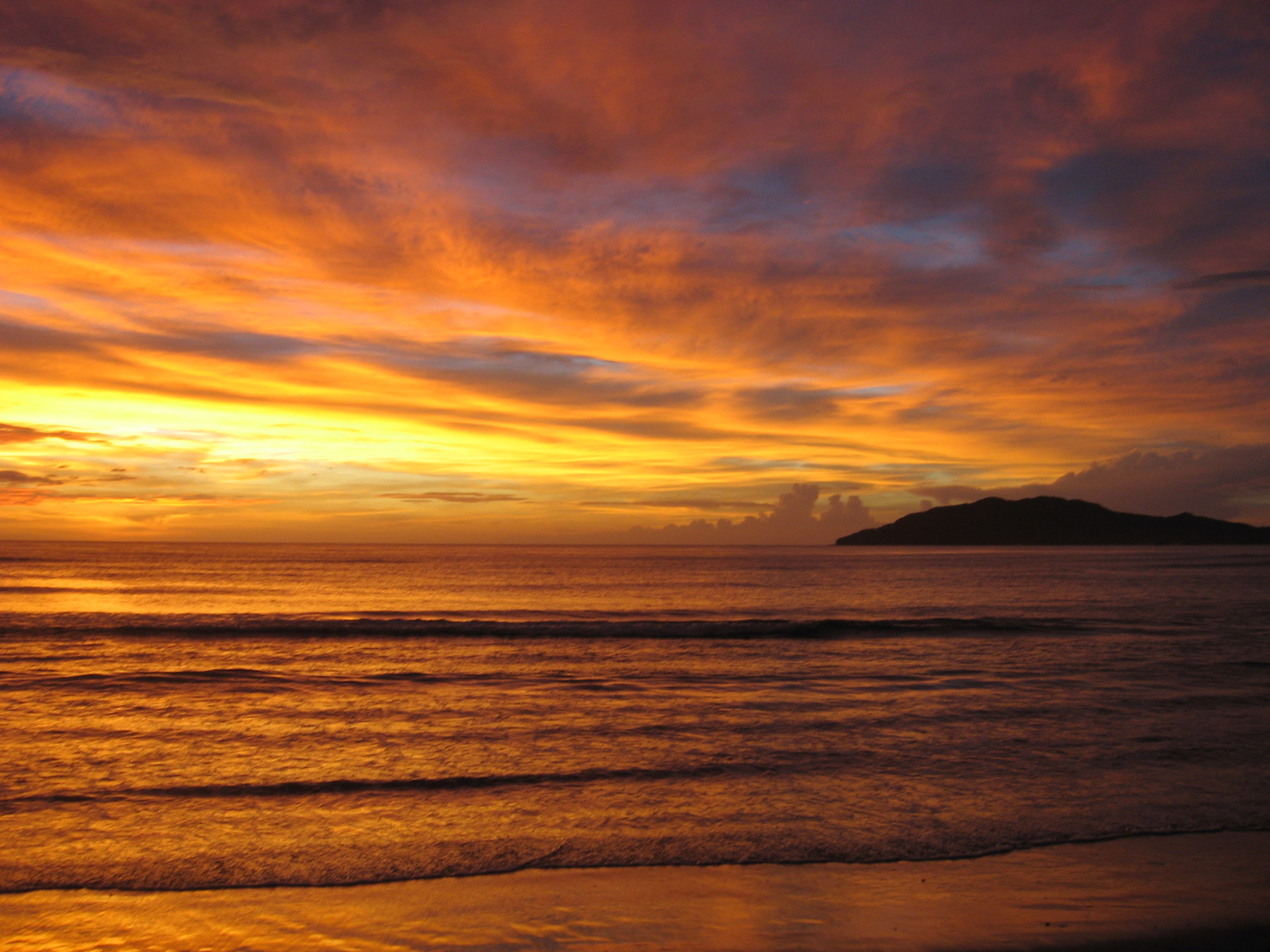
Sunset at Beach Grande

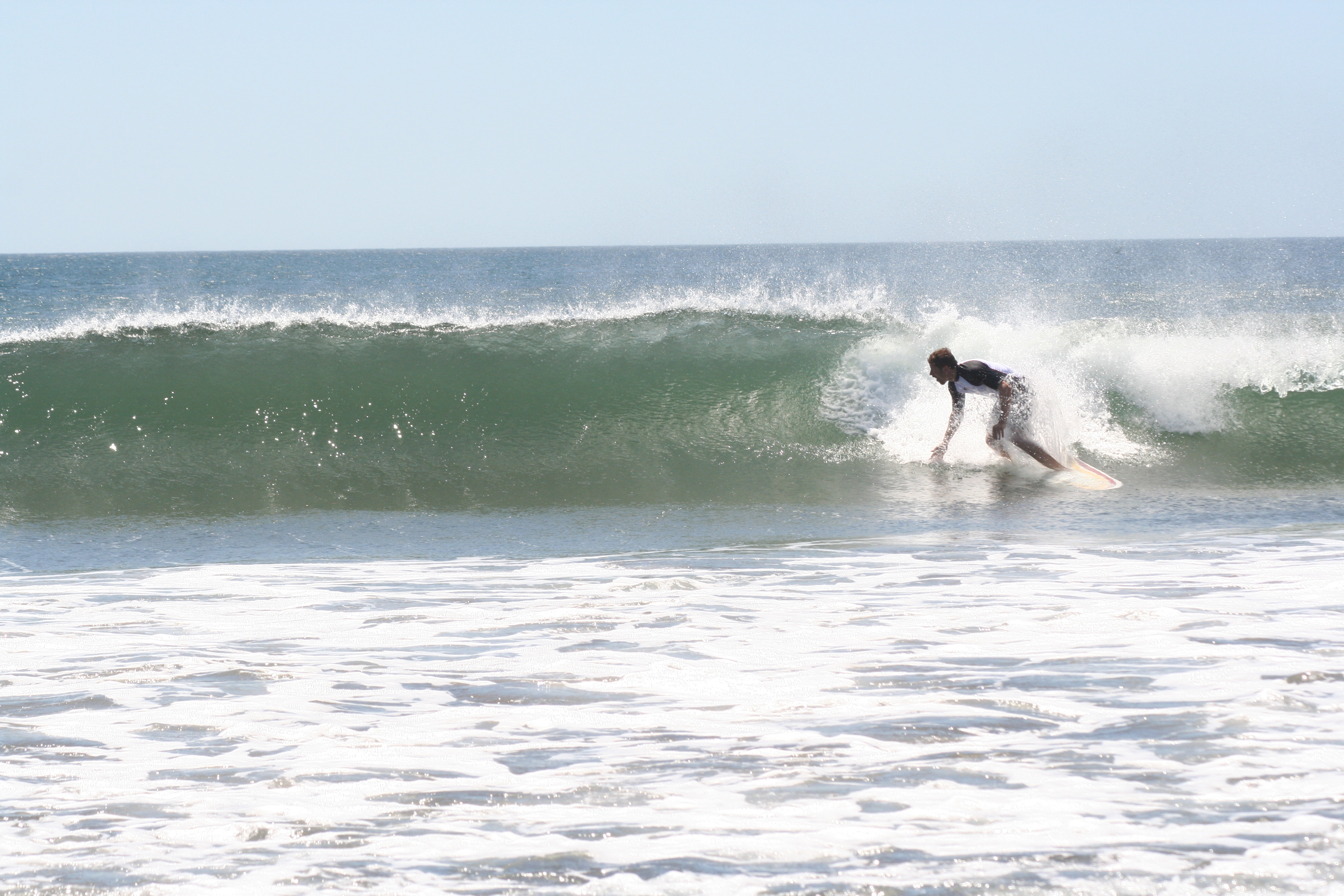
Surfing in Roca Bruja, Tamarindo.
