= Cabo Velas =

District in Guanacaste province, Costa Rica

- District
- Interactive map of Cabo Velas
- Cabo Velas district location in Costa Rica
- Coordinates: 10.3768579°N 85.8199233°W
- Country: Costa Rica
- Province: Guanacaste
- Canton: Santa Cruz
- Creation: 30 November 1988

Area
  - Total: 73.5 km^{2} (28.4 sq mi)
- Elevation: 26 m (85 ft)

Population (2011)
  - Total: 3,362
  - Density: 45.7/km^{2} (118/sq mi)
- Time zone: UTC−06:00
- Postal code: 50308

Cabo Velas is a district of the Santa Cruz canton, in the Guanacaste province of Costa Rica.

== History ==
Cabo Velas was created on 30 November 1988 by Acuerdo Ejecutivo 430.

== Geography ==
Cabo Velas has an area of 73.5 km^{2} (28.4 sq mi) and an elevation of 26 metres.

== Villages ==
Administrative center of the district is the village of Matapalo.

Other villages in the district are Brasilito, Conchal, Flamingo, Garita Vieja, Jesús María, Lajas, Lomas, Playa Real, Puerto Viejo, Salinas, Salinitas, Tacasolapa, Playa Grande and Zapotillal.

== Demographics ==
Historical population
Census	Pop.	±% p.a.
2000	2,132	—
2011	3,362	+4.23%
2022	3,776	+1.06%
Source: Instituto Nacional de Estadística y Censos; Centro Centroamericano de Población

For the 2011 census, Cabo Velas had a population of 3,362 inhabitants.

== Transportation ==
=== Road transportation ===
The district is covered by the following road routes:

- National Route 155
- National Route 180
- National Route 911
- National Route 933
