= Asociación Deportiva Santacruceña =

Association football club in Costa Rica

Santacruceña
- Full name: Asociación Deportiva; Santacruceña
- Founded: 1 September 2003
- Dissolved: 18 December 2008
- Ground: Estadio Cacique Diriá; Santa Cruz, Costa Rica
- Capacity: 1,500
- Chairman: Édgar Pizarro
Home colours	Away colours

Asociación Deportiva Santacruceña was a Costa Rican football club based in Santa Cruz.

== History ==
Founded as a football club in September 2003, the club quickly rose to prominence when it managed to reach the Costa Rican Primera División in two years, winning promotion from the Liga Ascenso in 2005 after beating Fusión Tibás in a promotion playoff.

They were relegated in summer 2007 and spent two seasons in the Segunda División de Costa Rica before withdrawing from the league in December 2008 due to financial problems.

== Coaches ==
- (Uruguay) Hernán Fernando Sosa (2004 – November 19, 2005)
- (Uruguay) Orlando de León (November 19, 2005 – 2006)
- (Uruguay) Alejandro Larrea (July 2006 – October 15, 2006)
- (Costa Rica) John Henry Villafuerte (October 18, 2006 – December 2006)
- (Spain) Ramón Vecinos (January 10, 2007 – July 2007)
