= National Route 911 (Costa Rica) =

National Road Route in Costa Rica

National Tertiary Route 911
- Ruta nacional terciaria 911

Route information
- Maintained by Ministry of Public Works and Transport
- Length: 21.815 km (13.555 mi)

Location
- Country: Costa Rica
- Provinces: Guanacaste

Highway system
- National Road Network of Costa Rica
← Route 910	→ Route 912

National Tertiary Route 911, or just Route 911 (Spanish: Ruta Nacional Terciaria 911, or Ruta 911) is a National Road Route of Costa Rica, located in the Guanacaste province.

== Description ==
In Guanacaste province the route covers Santa Cruz canton (Tempate and Cabo Velas districts) and Carrillo canton (Sardinal district).
