= Santa Cruz District, Santa Cruz, Guanacaste =

District in Santa Cruz canton, Guanacaste province, Costa Rica

Santa Cruz
- District
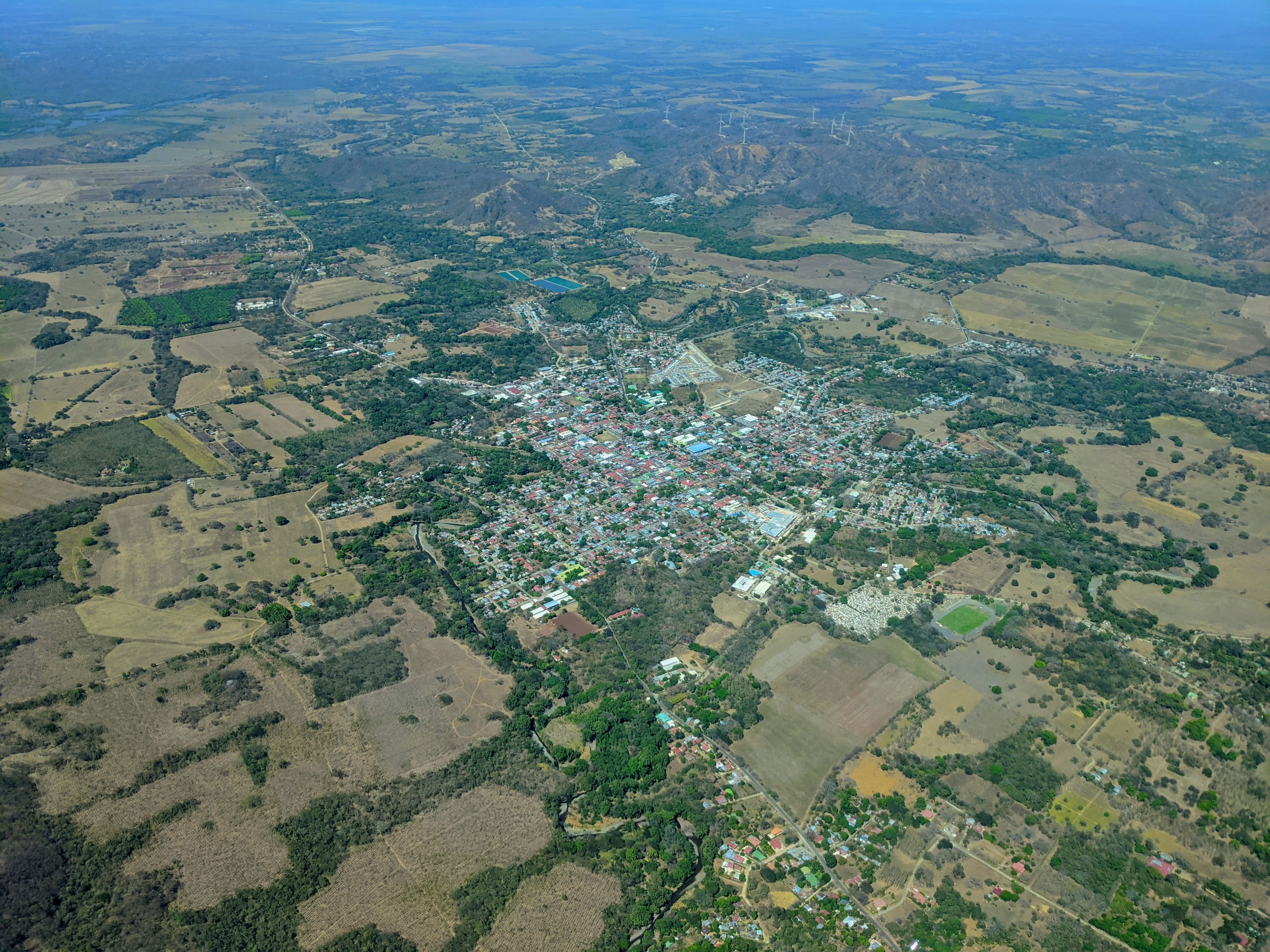
- The town of Santa Cruz, administrative center of the canton and district of Santa Cruz
- Santa Cruz district
- Santa Cruz district location in Costa Rica
- Coordinates: 10.2148723°N 85.6145086°W
- Country: Costa Rica
- Province: Guanacaste
- Canton: Santa Cruz

Area
  - Total: 289.6 km^{2} (111.8 sq mi)
- Elevation: 50 m (160 ft)

Population (2011)
  - Total: 21,544
  - Density: 74.39/km^{2} (192.7/sq mi)
- Time zone: UTC−06:00
- Postal code: 50301

Santa Cruz is a district of the Santa Cruz canton, in the Guanacaste province of Costa Rica.

== Geography ==
Santa Cruz has an area of 289.6 km^{2} and an elevation of 50 metres.

== Villages ==
Administrative center of the district is the town of Santa Cruz.

Other villages in the district are Ángeles, Arado, Bernabela, Cacao, Cinto, Conga, Cuatro Esquinas, Chibola, Chircó, Chumico, Guayabal, Hato Viejo, Lagunilla, Lechuza, Limón, Moya, Puente Negro. Retallano (partly), Rincón, Río Caño Viejo, San Juan, San Pedro and Vistamar.

== Demographics ==
Historical population
Census	Pop.	±% p.a.
1883	660	—
1927	3,976	+4.17%
1950	5,232	+1.20%
1963	8,028	+3.35%
1973	10,672	+2.89%
1984	12,866	+1.71%
2000	17,486	+1.94%
2011	21,544	+1.92%
2022	29,634	+2.94%
Source: Instituto Nacional de Estadística y Censos; Centro Centroamericano de Población

For the 2011 census, Santa Cruz had a population of 21,544 inhabitants.

== Transportation ==
=== Road transportation ===
The district is covered by the following road routes:

- National Route 21
- National Route 160
- National Route 904
- National Route 909
- National Route 931
