= National Route 904 (Costa Rica) =

National Road Route in Costa Rica

National Tertiary Route 904
- Ruta nacional terciaria 904

Route information
- Maintained by Ministry of Public Works and Transport
- Length: 21.675 km (13.468 mi)

Location
- Country: Costa Rica
- Provinces: Guanacaste

Highway system
- National Road Network of Costa Rica
← Route 903	→ Route 905

National Tertiary Route 904, or just Route 904 (Spanish: Ruta Nacional Terciaria 904, or Ruta 904) is a National Road Route of Costa Rica, located in the Guanacaste province.

== Description ==
In Guanacaste province the route covers Santa Cruz canton (Santa Cruz, Veintisiete de Abril, and Cuajiniquil districts).
