= Nicoya (canton) =

Canton in Guanacaste province, Costa Rica

- Canton
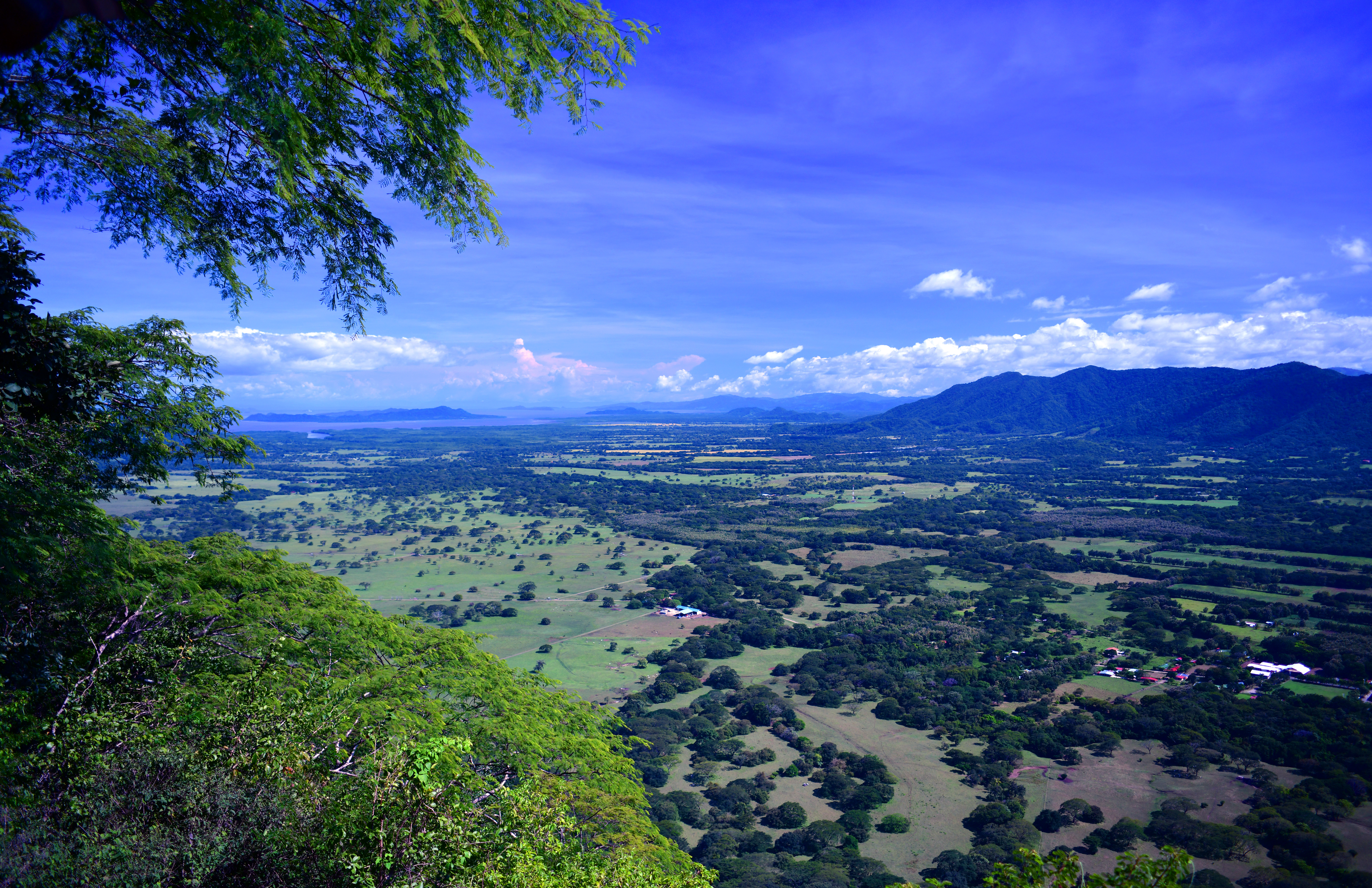
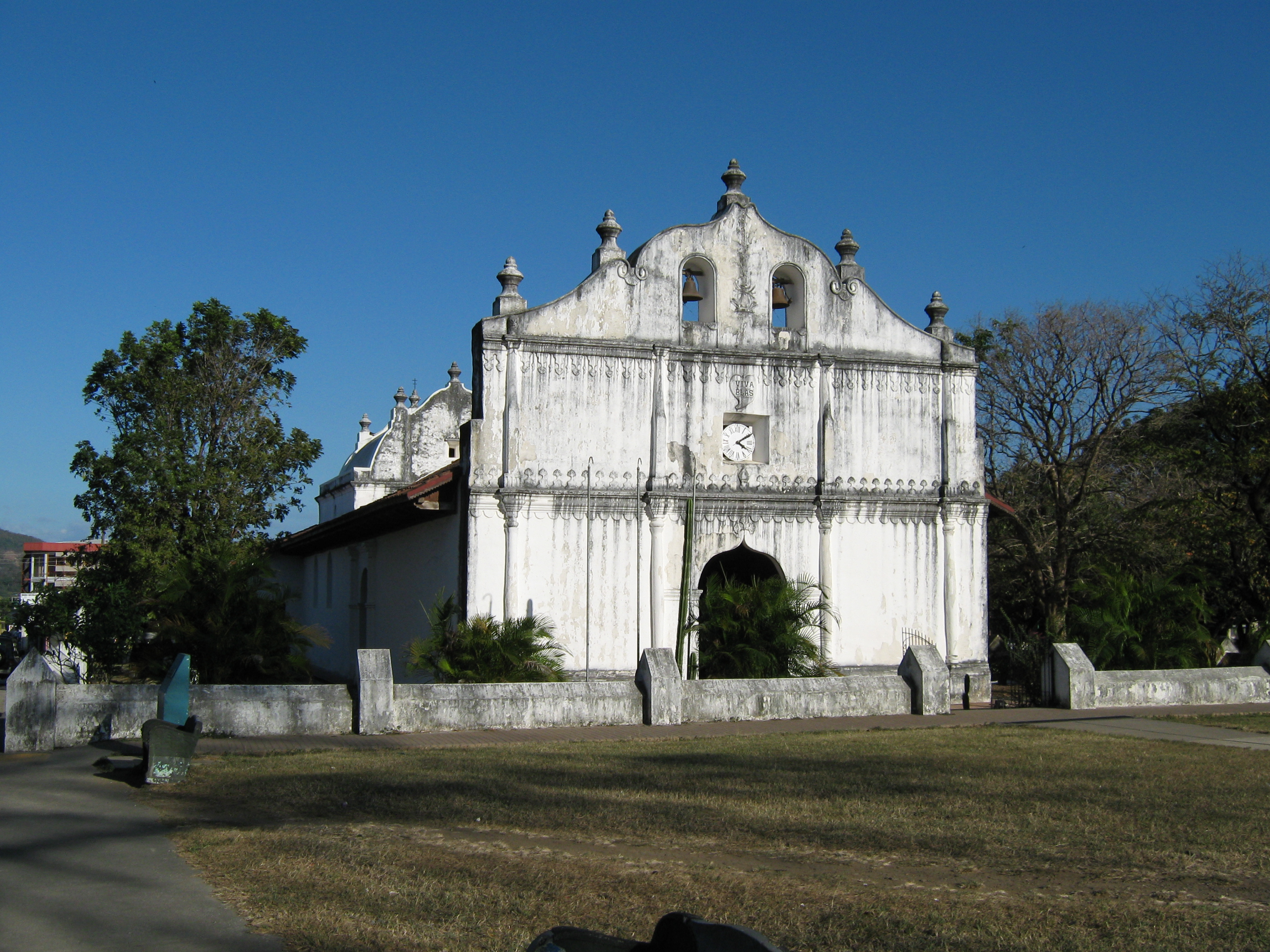
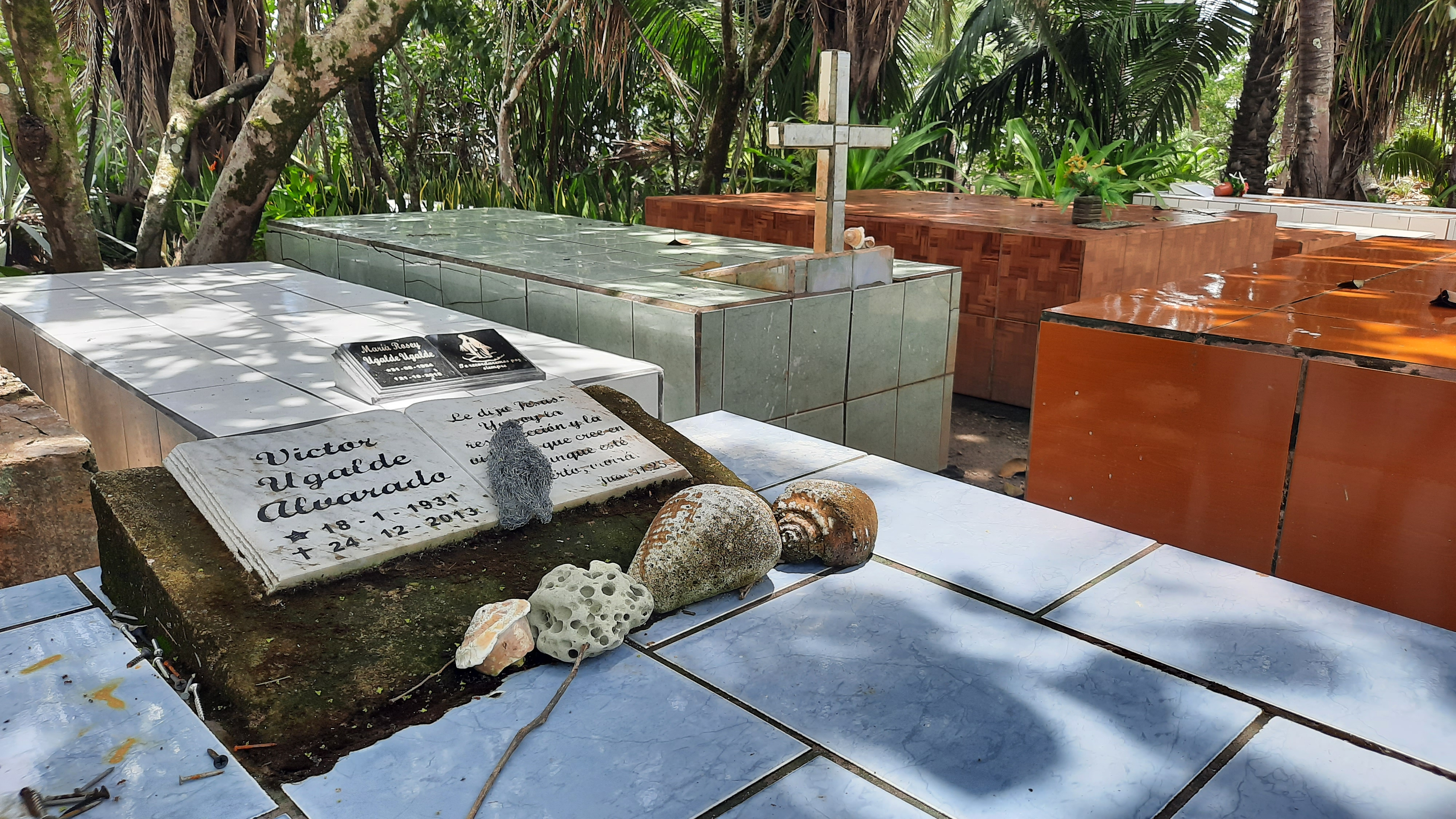
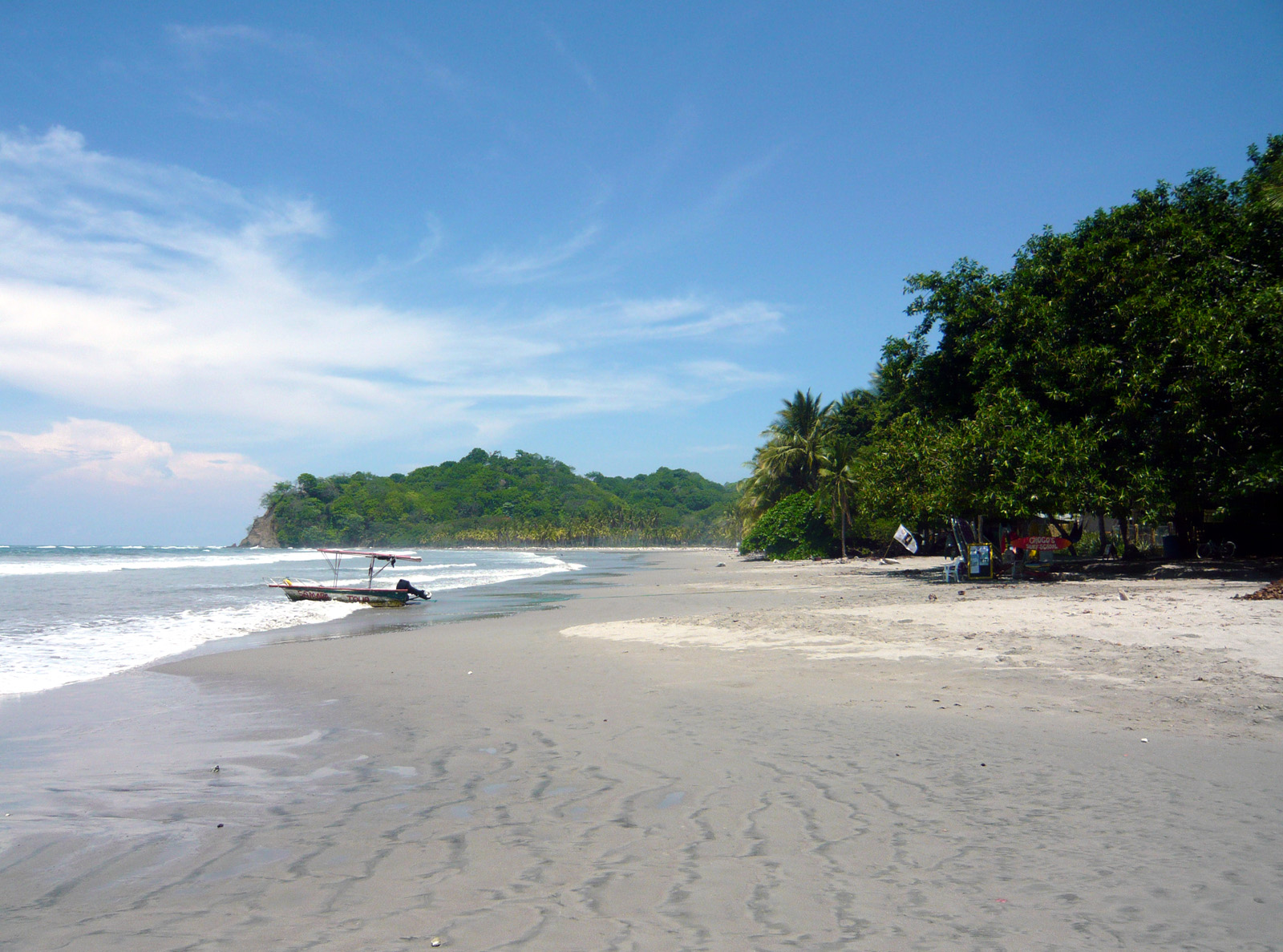
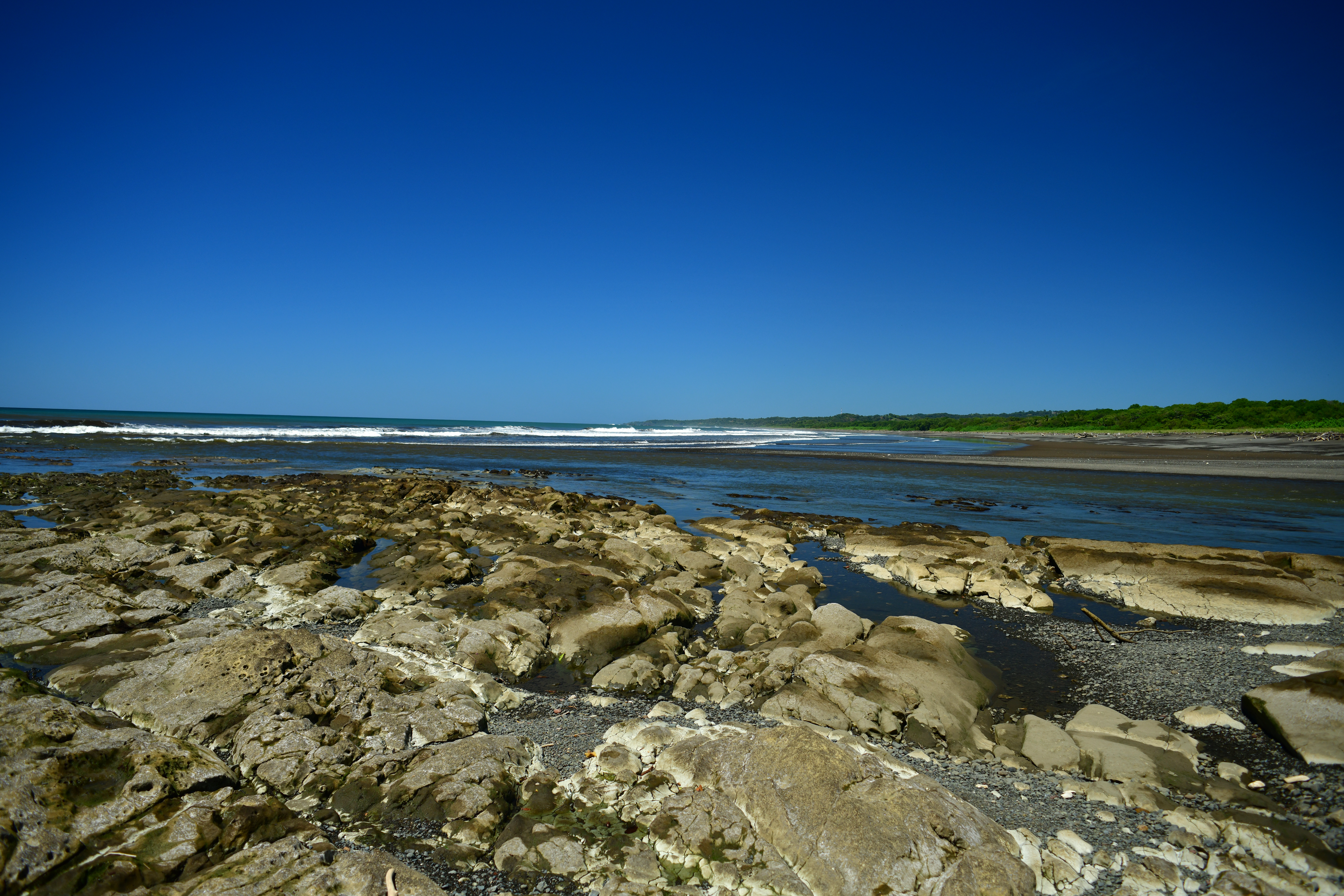
- View of Barra Honda National Park in 2021 Church of Saint Blaise of Nicoya Cabuya Island Cemetery Sámara Beach Nosara Biological Reserve

- Flag
- Motto: De la Patria por nuestra voluntad (Spanish) "From the Homeland by our will"
- Nicoya canton
- Nicoya canton location in Costa Rica
- Coordinates: 10.102409°N 85.4430903°W
- Country: Costa Rica
- Province: Guanacaste
- Creation: 7 December 1848
- Head city: Nicoya
- Districts: Districts: Nicoya; Mansión; San Antonio; Quebrada Honda; Sámara; Nosara; Belén de Nosarita

Government
  - Type: Municipality
  - Body: Municipalidad de Nicoya
  - Mayor: Carlos Martínez Arias (LGN)

Area
  - Total: 1,333.68 km^{2} (514.94 sq mi)
- Elevation: 66 m (217 ft)

Population (2011)
  - Total: 50,825
  - Estimate (2022): 66,268
  - Density: 38.109/km^{2} (98.701/sq mi)
- Time zone: UTC−06:00
- Canton code: 502
- Website: www.nicoya.go.cr

Nicoya is a canton in the Guanacaste province of Costa Rica. The head city is in Nicoya district.

== History ==
=== Proto-historical Nicoya ===
When conquistador Gil Gonzalez Dávila entered Nicoya in 1523, it was the largest cacicazgo (chiefdom) on the Pacific coast of Costa Rica. Though it is often surmised that the city and peninsula of Nicoya derive their name from a cacique Nicoa (or Nicoya) who welcomed Dávila and his men, Nicoya actually took its name from the Nahuatl appellation Necoc Īāuh, literally "on both sides its water(s)", as Nicoya is in fact situated between two major rivers. The Peninsula de Nicoya is itself named for the city, Nicoya being the most important town in that area.

The treasurer on Dávila's expedition, Andrés de Cereceda, reported a population of 6,063 inhabitants under Nicoya's leadership, almost five and a half times larger than the next largest settlement visited by the Spanish along the Pacific coast in the early 1520s. According to 16th-century chronicler Gonzalo Fernández de Oviedo y Valdés, who visited Nicoya in 1529, the layout of the indigenous community was similar to that of the larger settlements in nearby Nicaragua and included a central plaza with temples, a low pyramidal mound used for human sacrifice, and specialized plazas for markets and chiefs' residences.

Many of the earliest colonial documents about pre-Columbian Nicoya appear to have been lost in a fire that burned the town's archives in 1783. In the resulting documentary vacuum, a number of interpretations regarding pre-Hispanic Nicoya have emerged. Foremost among them is the belief that as the southernmost representatives of Mesoamerican culture, Nicoyans lived in nucleated villages, and that Cereceda's accounting of 6,063 souls merely represented the number of inhabitants of one village under chief Nicoya's control. The modern city of Nicoya is generally believed to be on the site of that village.

The center of Nicoya is spatially organized in the traditional Spanish-American pattern, with a central plaza surrounded by streets ordered in a grid pattern aligned with the cardinal directions. Atypically, the church is in the northeastern corner of the central plaza, not facing the plaza from a surrounding street, as was the Iberian norm. Today the church is locally referred to as the templo colonial; local oral history maintains that the church dates from some time between 1522 and 1544, when the parish of Nicoya was founded.

The eminent Costa Rican historian Carlos Meléndez took note of the unusual location of the templo colonial in the urban core of the city and, based on Oviedo's brief description of the indigenous community, hypothesized that the church had been built atop the indigenous sacrificial mound. Meléndez's hypothesis fits the known Spanish pattern of direct superimposition of Catholic politico-religious structures on indigenous structures such as pyramids in Mesoamerica and Andean South America, or kiva structures in the U.S. Southwest. In short, Meléndez argued that the location of the colonial church is not merely an aberration from the common Iberian pattern of facing the plaza but is coincident with the location of the sacrificial mound in the northeastern corner of the plaza of indigenous Nicoya as described by Oviedo in 1529.

Archaeological excavations were conducted in and around the city of Nicoya in the early 1990s to test these theories and to better understand how the indigenous community was transformed into a colonial town. Excavations in the center of Nicoya failed to produce any evidence of a substantial pre-Columbian presence in the city's center. Investigations into the surrounding valley failed to identify unequivocally a single site as the probable home to Nicoya. However, several large (5–10 hectare/12–24 acre) archaeological sites were in similar ecological niches throughout the valley. They are situated along river and stream banks at the point where streams leave the hills that surround the valley and cross the undulating valley floor.

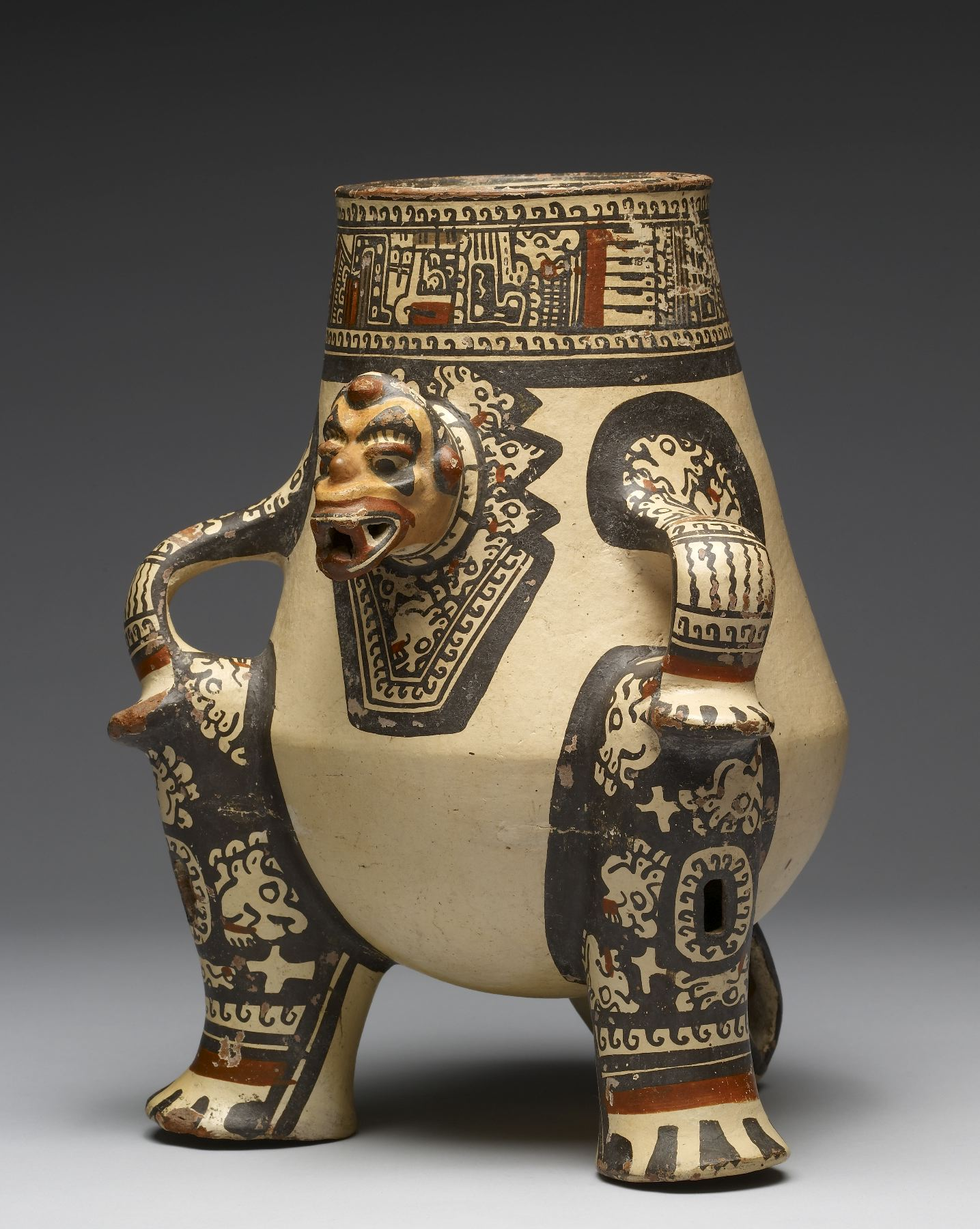
This Pataky ceramic (late Period VI, AD 1000-1350) portrays a seated shaman transformed into a jaguar spirit companion form.

At least two of these sites are considered likely candidates for protohistoric Nicoya. One is just outside contemporary Nicoya along the banks of the Rio Chipanzé. The other is in the hamlet of Sabana Grande, six kilometers north of Nicoya. This site appears to be larger than the rest; it exhibits low earthen mounds and is particularly prized by local looters for its high-quality polychrome pottery and gold artifacts. Apparently, a much greater quantity of high-quality artifacts have been removed from the vicinity of Sabana Grande than from Nicoya or anywhere else in the valley. Furthermore, the colonial ejido (lands held in common by the indigenous community) of the Indian community of Nicoya was in Sabana Grande, not Nicoya.

It is only possible to consider either of these sites as protohistoric Nicoya if we discard the notion that it was a single community of over more than 6,000. Neither site is near the size necessary to hold that number of people if we accept even as an approximate Newson's (1987:87) estimates of 0.045 to 0.06 persons/hectare for Pacific Nicaragua at Spanish contact, and as little as 0.02 persons/hectare for Nicoya. A closer reading of the ethnohistoric material in conjunction with the archaeological information is necessary to form a more realistic picture of Nicoya on the eve of conquest. It is worthwhile returning to Andrés de Cereceda, treasurer of Gil Gonzalez Dávila's 1522 expedition, and review his own words in regard to Nicoya:

"The chief Nicoya is five leagues further on, inland: they baptized 6,603 souls; he gave 13,442 pesos in gold, with a little more than the chief Mateo gave".

=== Colonial Nicoya ===
Nicoya was the largest indigenous chiefdom encountered by the Spanish when they first entered northwestern Costa Rica in 1523. Historical records are mute on what these people called themselves or the precise detail of their political organization. Other than the fact that they spoke a language belonging to the Oto-Manguean language family, nothing is known of their tongue. According to records from that first encounter in 1523, over 6,000 souls were saved by baptism performed by the expedition's priest.

During the first 50 years of Conquest, Nicoya was of great local importance as a transshipment point between the more active Spanish colonies in Nicaragua and Panama; a staging area and breadbasket for the initial entradas, forays into the interior, by Juan Vázquez de Coronado; and a rich encomienda (source of tribute) for the governor of Nicaragua, Pedrarias Dávila and his family. Each of these economic activities dissipated in a brief time, however, and Nicoya rapidly devolved into a colonial backwater.

There is no historical record that Nicoya ever offered armed resistance against the invaders. They quickly accepted Christianity. It was armed resistance and rejection of Catholicism that justified the Holy War waged by the Spanish against the native peoples of the Americas. Regardless of justification, the historical record speaks clearly that native Nicoyans were incorporated into the Spanish colonial empire and simply became identified by the racial category of Indios (Indians).

In becoming "Indians," native Nicoyans were ascribed by royal decree to a racial category from which it was difficult to escape. Ostensibly, Spanish colonial policy was designed to protect native peoples, who were wards of the state and church. Sensible to the economic effects of massive population decline, the Crown acted during the 16th and 17th centuries to protect their charges from the ill effects of direct exposure to Europeans. Segregation was one means to an end. A colonial policy established Pueblos de Indios (Indian towns) in which Spaniards (excepting crown and ecclesiastical authorities) were prohibited from living. In essence, it provided a series of static rights and obligations and a relationship to the State that was inviolate.

As newly minted Indians, 16th-century Nicoyans were taken as slaves and the community obligated to pay tribute in goods and services (known as the encomienda) to a succession of Spanish families as reward for their service to the Crown during the Conquest. As discussed above, there is indirect evidence that the native Nicoyans were forced to resettle from their original hamlets and villages to a single, nucleated town that is the Nicoya of today. It was not uncommon for the Spanish authorities to order such resettlement to maintain control over indigenous peoples as they suffered a precipitous decline in numbers during the 16th and early 17th centuries. As populations thinned out, the Spanish would simply order the survivors to move to a single community to maintain a political, economic and ecclesiastical eye on them.

Nicoya was one such Indian town and in the 1760s had no more than about 320 inhabitants. The structure of social relations were established in the community, approximately two centuries before and at the time, had certainly provided a measure of security. The native Nicoyans were provided with a new social identity in the colonial order – "Indians" – and a social space in a hierarchical caste system based on race that defined their rights and obligations, and a physical space (the town) in which they could exist. The Indians were obligated to make tribute payments and were given limited powers of self-government and had (in theory) access to a public defender's office (Defensor de Indios) for their corporate legal defense.

By the decade of the 1760s, however, life in Nicoya was becoming more and more tenuous. The Spanish colonial enterprise, as all colonial enterprises, was an extractive one. Valuable goods were quickly identified and exported to Spain or other colonies: at first the precious metals, followed by traffic in human beings, and later by a variety of agricultural commodities. The small Indian community could not provide sufficient labor and the region's population was therefore augmented by the presence of members from two other racial groups as recognized in Spanish colonial social system: Mulatos (undoubtedly arrived from Panama, although the historical record is silent on this issue) and Ladinos, or people of mixed Native and Spanish ancestry.

What had evolved by the mid-18th century in Spanish-dominated portions of lower Central America was, in essence, a system of apartheid, in which islands of isolated indigenous communities were surrounded by non-indigenous peoples of heterogeneous background. Spanish, Mulatos and Ladinos settled on the cattle ranches surrounding Nicoya and, with direct access to the principal factor of production (land), were easily able to dominate the local economy. A creole culture emerged among the non-Indians on their dispersed ranches, a local variant of a lifestyle based on cattle ranching that spread along the Pacific margin of Central America all the way to what is now the southwestern United States. Social relations between the local creoles and the Indians of Nicoya are hard to gauge; the documentary record was not typically concerned with such matters.

However, one colonial document from 1765 may be highly indicative of the poor state of relations between the two ethnic groups and illustrative of the stark difference in the degree of estrangement between the Indians of Nicoya and surrounding Ladino community. The document presents a petition to the Crown by a union of 200 Ladinos to form their own town apart from that of Nicoya. The arguments supporting their request were phrased in the language of ethnic group solidarity: The Ladinos sought the improvements that came from leaving their dispersed ranches and living in a town of their own and away from the Indians in Nicoya. Nicoya was reported to be economically defunct and its community quickly dying. The choice presented by the Ladinos was one between life in a new creole town and death if they had to rely on Nicoya. The Crown agreed to their petition.

The representation that the Ladinos made of social conditions in Nicoya may not have been far off the mark. Essentially isolated in their community and surrounded by more-or-less hostile neighbors, the native community persisted, it would appear, more by the weight of centripetal forces exterior to the community itself, keeping in check the centrifugal pressures within the community for dissolution. In more concrete terms, the economic and political needs of the State maintained the artificial boundaries and structure of an "Indian" community, well past the date when the community, as an ethnically identifiable social entity, would have dissolved through the typical processes of acculturation and assimilation.

To this historically particular moment we add the structural contradictions in the political structure of the Spanish colonies. The point of contact between Crown and Indians was the local administrative authority, the Corregidor. Provided enormous leeway in the weak state system of colonial governance, the position of Corregidor was purchased. The individual who held it for a specified number of years was free to exploit it for his personal economic benefit by functioning within a closed market system as the sole distributor of manufactured goods to the Indians in the towns they controlled and by purchasing marketable goods produced by the 'Indians' under their charge. No controls were placed on prices beyond the caprice of the Corregidor, who had the coercive power of the state to insure that the price demands were met. While the Corregidor did fulfill an important economic role, clearly the system was ripe for abuse, and abused it was.

=== The Indian revolt of 1760–61 ===
By the mid-18th century, the middle phase of the colonial period, an uneasy balance of power and authority had evolved between different elements of colonial society in Nicoya and its surrounding hinterland. The Indian community of Nicoya persisted weakly as a shadow of its former self, maintained by a tradition of reciprocal ties of rights and obligations to patriarchal Crown authority. However, this tradition rested primarily on a crucial link, the Corregidor, and in late 1750s this tradition was turned on its head and Nicoya as an independent ethnic community began to unravel.

In 1756, Don Santiago Alfeiran was appointed Corregidor of Nicoya. A Spaniard, he had never set foot in Nicoya until he arrived to take his post in 1758. Traditional relations of obligation and exchange were quickly replaced by increasingly onerous demands on the community's productive capabilities, followed by exceptionally harsh physical abuse when those demands were not met. For example, tribute in Nicoya was traditionally paid by one product that could be produced nowhere else in the region: cotton thread dyed purple with the secretion of a rare mollusk found on the Pacific Coast of the genus Murex. This dye had been exploited during pre-Columbian times, and the Nicoyans took great care not to kill the mollusk when extracting the dye. To not stress the animals, they only dyed cotton every three months. Alfeiran demanded a threefold increase in production, altering traditional forms of production that had been in effect at least since the early colonial period, if not extending into the pre-Columbian past. Multiple court cases related to Alfeiran's tenure attest that this was just one, and perhaps not the most serious, example of a new order for the native community.

=== Recent history ===
Nicoya was created on 7 December, 1848 by decree 167.

On 5 September 2012, Nicoya was struck by a magnitude 7.6 earthquake, destroying houses in the canton.

== Geography ==
Nicoya has an area of 1,333.68 km^{2} (514.94 sq mi) and a mean elevation of 66 metres.

The Tempisque River establishes the northeast boundary of the canton, which cuts through the midsection of the Nicoya Peninsula, touching the Gulf of Nicoya on the east before curving southward to the Pacific Ocean.

== Districts ==
The canton of Nicoya is subdivided into the following districts:

1. Nicoya
2. Mansión
3. San Antonio
4. Quebrada Honda
5. Sámara
6. Nosara
7. Belén de Nosarita

== Demographics ==
Historical population
Census	Pop.	±% p.a.
1864	2,407	—
1883	3,824	+2.47%
1892	4,577	+2.02%
1927	11,005	+2.54%
1950	29,918	+4.44%
1963	36,276	+1.49%
1973	37,185	+0.25%
1984	36,626	−0.14%
2000	42,189	+0.89%
2011	50,825	+1.71%
2022	66,268	+2.44%
Source: Instituto Nacional de Estadística y Censos; Centro Centroamericano de Población

For the 2011 census, Nicoya had a population of 50,825 inhabitants.

== Transportation ==
=== Road transportation ===
The canton is covered by the following road routes:

- National Route 18
- National Route 21
- National Route 150
- National Route 157
- National Route 158
- National Route 160
- National Route 905
- National Route 906
- National Route 907
- National Route 920
- National Route 921
- National Route 929
- National Route 931
- National Route 934
