= National Route 905 (Costa Rica) =

National Road Route in Costa Rica

National Tertiary Route 905
- Ruta nacional terciaria 905

Route information
- Maintained by Ministry of Public Works and Transport
- Length: 13.210 km (8.208 mi)

Location
- Country: Costa Rica
- Provinces: Guanacaste

Highway system
- National Road Network of Costa Rica
← Route 904	→ Route 906

National Tertiary Route 905, or just Route 905 (Spanish: Ruta Nacional Terciaria 905, or Ruta 905) is a National Road Route of Costa Rica, located in the Guanacaste province.

== Description ==
In Guanacaste province the route covers Nicoya canton (Nicoya, Mansión, and San Antonio districts).
