= National Route 921 (Costa Rica) =

National Road Route in Costa Rica

National Tertiary Route 921
- Ruta nacional terciaria 921

Route information
- Maintained by Ministry of Public Works and Transport
- Length: 12.420 km (7.717 mi)

Location
- Country: Costa Rica
- Provinces: Guanacaste

Highway system
- National Road Network of Costa Rica
← Route 920	→ Route 922

National Tertiary Route 921, or just Route 921 (Spanish: Ruta Nacional Terciaria 921, or Ruta 921) is a National Road Route of Costa Rica, located in the Guanacaste province.

== Description ==
In Guanacaste province the route covers Nicoya canton (Nicoya district).
