= National Route 909 (Costa Rica) =

National Road Route in Costa Rica

National Tertiary Route 909
- Ruta nacional terciaria 909

Route information
- Maintained by Ministry of Public Works and Transport
- Length: 11.595 km (7.205 mi)

Location
- Country: Costa Rica
- Provinces: Guanacaste

Highway system
- National Road Network of Costa Rica
← Route 907	→ Route 910

National Tertiary Route 909, or just Route 909 (Spanish: Ruta Nacional Terciaria 909, or Ruta 909) is a National Road Route of Costa Rica, located in the Guanacaste province.

== Description ==
In Guanacaste province the route covers Santa Cruz canton (Santa Cruz, Veintisiete de Abril, and Tempate districts).
