= National Route 931 (Costa Rica) =

National Road Route in Costa Rica

National Tertiary Route 931
- Ruta nacional terciaria 931

Route information
- Maintained by Ministry of Public Works and Transport
- Length: 15.325 km (9.523 mi)

Location
- Country: Costa Rica
- Provinces: Guanacaste

Highway system
- National Road Network of Costa Rica
| ← Route 930 | → Route 933 |

National Tertiary Route 931, or just Route 931 (Spanish: Ruta Nacional Terciaria 931, or Ruta 931) is a National Road Route of Costa Rica, located in the Guanacaste province.

== Description ==
In Guanacaste province the route covers Nicoya canton (San Antonio district) and Santa Cruz canton (Santa Cruz, Diriá districts).
