= National Route 157 (Costa Rica) =

National Road Route in Costa Rica

National Secondary Route 157
- Ruta nacional secundaria 157

Route information
- Maintained by Ministry of Public Works and Transport
- Length: 8.930 km (5.549 mi)

Location
- Country: Costa Rica
- Provinces: Guanacaste

Highway system
- National Road Network of Costa Rica
← Route 156	→ Route 158

National Secondary Route 157, or just Route 157 (Spanish: Ruta Nacional Secundaria 157, or Ruta 157) is a National Road Route of Costa Rica located in the Guanacaste province.

== Description ==
In Guanacaste province the route covers Nicoya canton (Nicoya and Mansión districts).
