= National Route 180 (Costa Rica) =

National Road Route in Costa Rica

National Secondary Route 180
- Ruta nacional secundaria 180

Route information
- Maintained by Ministry of Public Works and Transport
- Length: 11.105 km (6.900 mi)

Location
- Country: Costa Rica
- Provinces: Guanacaste

Highway system
- National Road Network of Costa Rica
← Route 177	→ Route 200

National Secondary Route 180, or just Route 180 (Spanish: Ruta Nacional Secundaria 180, or Ruta 180) is a National Road Route of Costa Rica located in the Guanacaste province.

== Description ==
In Guanacaste province the route covers Santa Cruz canton (Tempate and Cabo Velas districts).
