= San Antonio District, Nicoya =

District in Nicoya canton, Guanacaste province, Costa Rica

San Antonio
- District
- San Antonio district
- San Antonio district location in Costa Rica
- Coordinates: 10.2547533°N 85.3777697°W
- Country: Costa Rica
- Province: Guanacaste
- Canton: Nicoya

Area
  - Total: 334.01 km^{2} (128.96 sq mi)
- Elevation: 68 m (223 ft)

Population (2011)
  - Total: 6,642
  - Density: 19.89/km^{2} (51.50/sq mi)
- Time zone: UTC−06:00
- Postal code: 50203

San Antonio is a district of the Nicoya canton, in the Guanacaste province of Costa Rica.

== Geography ==
San Antonio has an area of 334.01 km^{2} and an elevation of 68 metres.

== Locations ==
- Barrios: Guayabal
- Poblados: Biscoyol, Bolsa, Boquete, Buenos Aires, Cañal, Carao, Cerro Mesas, Conchal, Corral de Piedra, Corralillo, Coyolar, Cuba, Cuesta Madroño, Chira, Flor, Florida, Guayabo, Loma Ayote, Matamba, México, Montañita, Monte Galán, Moracia, Ojo de Agua, Palos Negros, Piave, Piedras Blancas, Pozas, Pozo de Agua, Pueblo Nuevo, Puerto Humo, Rosario, San Lázaro, San Vicente, Silencio, Talolinga, Tamarindo, Zapote

== Demographics ==
Historical population
| Census | Pop. | ±% p.a. |
|---|---|---|
| 1927 | 3,167 | — |
| 1950 | 4,807 | +1.83% |
| 1963 | 6,550 | +2.41% |
| 1973 | 7,061 | +0.75% |
| 1984 | 6,510 | −0.74% |
| 2000 | 6,662 | +0.14% |
| 2011 | 6,642 | −0.03% |
| 2022 | 8,031 | +1.74% |
Source: Instituto Nacional de Estadística y Censos; Centro Centroamericano de Población

For the 2011 census, San Antonio had a population of 6,642 inhabitants.

== Transportation ==
=== Road transportation ===
The district is covered by the following road routes:

- National Route 150
- National Route 905
- National Route 906
- National Route 907
- National Route 920
- National Route 929
- National Route 931
