= National Route 934 (Costa Rica) =

National Road Route in Costa Rica

National Tertiary Route 934
- Ruta nacional terciaria 934

Route information
- Maintained by Ministry of Public Works and Transport
- Length: 8.645 km (5.372 mi)

Location
- Country: Costa Rica
- Provinces: Guanacaste

Highway system
- National Road Network of Costa Rica
← Route 933	→ Route 935

National Tertiary Route 934, or just Route 934 (Spanish: Ruta Nacional Terciaria 934, or Ruta 934) is a National Road Route of Costa Rica, located in the Guanacaste province.

== Description ==
In Guanacaste province the route covers Nicoya canton (Sámara district).

== History ==
This route was severely damaged in November 2020 due to the indirect effects of Hurricane Eta.
