= National Route 920 (Costa Rica) =

National Road Route in Costa Rica

National Tertiary Route 920
- Ruta nacional terciaria 920

Route information
- Maintained by Ministry of Public Works and Transport
- Length: 36.750 km (22.835 mi)

Location
- Country: Costa Rica
- Provinces: Guanacaste

Highway system
- National Road Network of Costa Rica
← Route 918	→ Route 921

National Tertiary Route 920, or just Route 920 (Spanish: Ruta Nacional Terciaria 920, or Ruta 920) is a National Road Route of Costa Rica, located in the Guanacaste province.

== Description ==
In Guanacaste province the route covers Nicoya canton (San Antonio district), Santa Cruz canton (Bolsón, Diriá districts), Carrillo canton (Filadelfia district).
