= National Route 155 (Costa Rica) =

National Road Route in Costa Rica

National Secondary Route 155
- Ruta nacional secundaria 155

Route information
- Maintained by Ministry of Public Works and Transport
- Length: 32.765 km (20.359 mi)

Location
- Country: Costa Rica
- Provinces: Guanacaste

Highway system
- National Road Network of Costa Rica
← Route 154	→ Route 156

National Secondary Route 155, or just Route 155 (Spanish: Ruta Nacional Secundaria 155, or Ruta 155) is a National Road Route of Costa Rica located in the Guanacaste province.

== Description ==
In Guanacaste province the route covers Santa Cruz canton (Tempate, Cartagena, Cabo Velas, and Tamarindo districts) and Carrillo canton (Belén district).
