= Ramón Vecinos =

Spanish football manager (1958–2009)

José Ramón Vecino
Personal information
- Full name: José Ramón Vecino Fernández
- Date of birth: 17 February 1958
- Place of birth: Quereño, Spain
- Date of death: 5 July 2009 (aged 51)
- Place of death: Playa Grande, Costa Rica
- Position: Forward

Managerial career
- Years: Team
- Selección Juvenil de Bierzo
- Atlético Bembibre
- Ponferradina
- 2002: Herediano
- 2002–2003: San Carlos
- 2005–2006: Árabe Unido
- 2006-2008: Santacruceña

Jose Ramón Vecino Fernández (19 February 1958 – 5 July 2009) was a Spanish football player and manager.

== Managerial career ==
Born in Quereño, Ourense, Vecinos managed several junior sides in his native Spain. He moved to Costa Rica after he earned his official coaching licence.

In October 2002 he took charge at Costa Rican top division side San Carlos after a spell at Herediano. In March 2003 he was dismissed at Costa Rican side San Carlos. He was the manager of Árabe Unido in Panama.

In June 2009 he reported to have signed for Salvadoran side Águila, only for the deal to fall through because Vecinos wanted to bring in his own backroom staff.

== Death ==
Vecino drowned in July 2009 in Playa Grande, Costa Rica, aged only 51. He left three children. He owned a restaurant in Liberia, Guanacaste and had lived in the country since 2000.
