= National Route 907 (Costa Rica) =

National Road Route in Costa Rica

National Tertiary Route 907
- Ruta nacional terciaria 907

Route information
- Maintained by Ministry of Public Works and Transport
- Length: 13.410 km (8.333 mi)

Location
- Country: Costa Rica
- Provinces: Guanacaste

Highway system
- National Road Network of Costa Rica
← Route 906	→ Route 909

National Tertiary Route 907, or just Route 907 (Spanish: Ruta Nacional Terciaria 907, or Ruta 907) is a National Road Route of Costa Rica, located in the Guanacaste province.

== Description ==
In Guanacaste province the route covers Nicoya canton (San Antonio and Quebrada Honda districts).
