= National Route 18 (Costa Rica) =

National Road Route in Costa Rica

National Primary Route 18
- Ruta nacional primaria 18

Route information
- Maintained by Ministry of Public Works and Transport
- Length: 49.245 km (30.599 mi)

Location
- Country: Costa Rica
- Provinces: Guanacaste

Highway system
- National Road Network of Costa Rica
← Route 17	→ Route 21

National Primary Route 18, or just Route 18 (Spanish: Ruta Nacional Primaria 18, or Ruta 18) is a National Road Route of Costa Rica, located in the Guanacaste province.

== Description ==
In Guanacaste province the route covers Nicoya canton (Mansión and Quebrada Honda districts), Cañas canton (Porozal district), and Abangares canton (Las Juntas and Colorado districts).

The La Amistad de Taiwán Bridge, which was financed, designed, and built by Taiwan, is located on this route.
