= National Route 152 (Costa Rica) =

National Road Route in Costa Rica

National Secondary Route 152
- Ruta nacional secundaria 152

Route information
- Maintained by Ministry of Public Works and Transport
- Length: 18.515 km (11.505 mi)

Location
- Country: Costa Rica
- Provinces: Guanacaste

Highway system
- National Road Network of Costa Rica
← Route 151	→ Route 153

National Secondary Route 152, or just Route 152 (Spanish: Ruta Nacional Secundaria 152, or Ruta 152) is a National Road Route of Costa Rica located in the Guanacaste province.

== Description ==
In Guanacaste province the route covers Santa Cruz canton (Veintisiete de Abril, Tamarindo districts).
