= Cuajiniquil District =

District in Santa Cruz canton, Guanacaste province, Costa Rica

Cuajiniquil
- District
- Interactive map of Cuajiniquil
- Cuajiniquil district location in Costa Rica
- Coordinates: 10.0617686°N 85.6985514°W
- Country: Costa Rica
- Province: Guanacaste
- Canton: Santa Cruz
- Creation: 11 November 1974

Area
  - Total: 218.65 km^{2} (84.42 sq mi)
- Elevation: 24 m (79 ft)

Population (2011)
  - Total: 1,789
  - Density: 8.182/km^{2} (21.19/sq mi)
- Time zone: UTC−06:00
- Postal code: 50306

Cuajiniquil is a district of the Santa Cruz canton, in the Guanacaste province of Costa Rica.

== History ==
Cuajiniquil was created on 11 November 1974 by Decreto Ejecutivo 4315-G. Segregated from Veintisiete de Abril.

== Geography ==
Cuajiniquil has an area of 218.65 km^{2} (84.42 sq mi) and an elevation of 24 metres.

== Villages ==
Administrative center of the district is the village of San Juanillo.

Other villages in the Cantons are Alemania, Bolillos, Cuajiniquil, Chiquero, Fortuna, Jazminal, Lagarto, Libertad, Limonal, Manzanillo, Marbella, Ostional, Palmares, Piedras Amarillas, Progreso, Punta Caliente, Quebrada Seca, Quebrada Zapote, Rayo, Roble, Rosario, Santa Cecilia, Santa Elena, Socorro, Unión and Veracruz.

== Demographics ==
Historical population
| Census | Pop. | ±% p.a. |
|---|---|---|
| 1984 | 2,154 | — |
| 2000 | 1,547 | −2.05% |
| 2011 | 1,789 | +1.33% |
| 2022 | 1,171 | −3.78% |
Source: Instituto Nacional de Estadística y Censos; Centro Centroamericano de Población

For the 2011 census, Cuajiniquil had a population of 1,789 inhabitants.

== Transportation ==
=== Road transportation ===
The district is covered by the following road routes:

- National Route 160
- National Route 904
