= National Route 928 (Costa Rica) =

National Road Route in Costa Rica

National Tertiary Route 928
- Ruta nacional terciaria 928

Route information
- Maintained by Ministry of Public Works and Transport
- Length: 8.015 km (4.980 mi)

Location
- Country: Costa Rica
- Provinces: Guanacaste

Highway system
- National Road Network of Costa Rica
← Route 927	→ Route 929

National Tertiary Route 928, or just Route 928 (Spanish: Ruta Nacional Terciaria 928, or Ruta 928) is a National Road Route of Costa Rica, located in the Guanacaste province.

== Description ==
In Guanacaste province the route covers Santa Cruz canton (Veintisiete de Abril district).
