= Pataki (surname) =

Pataki or Pataky is a Hungarian surname that literally means "from Patak". "Pataki" can also translate into "near a creek" or "someone who lived by a brook or a stream".

Notable bearers include:

== Pataki ==
- Allison Pataki (born 1984), American author
- András Pataki (born 1963), Hungarian dancer, director of the Szeged Contemporary Dance Company
- Andrew Pataki (1927–2011), Bishop Emeritus of Passaic for the Byzantines
- Ferenc Pataki (1917–1988), Hungarian gymnast, Olympic champion
- George Pataki (born 1945), Governor of New York (1995–2006)
- Ladislav Pataki (1946–2007), Slovak-American coach, sports scientist, masters track & field thrower
- Libby Pataki (born 1950), wife of George Pataki, First Lady of New York (1995–2006)
- Michael Pataki (1938–2010), American actor
- Mihály Pataki (1893–1977), Hungarian amateur football player
- Zita Pataki (born 1973), Hungarian news reporter

== Pataky ==
- Attila Pataky (born 1951), Edda Művek vocalist
- Bill Pataky (1930–2004), Canadian Olympic basketball player (1952)
- Elsa Pataky (born 1976), Spanish model and actress
- Etelka Barsi-Pataky (1941–2018), Hungarian politician

== Fictional characters ==
- Helga G. Pataki, character on Hey Arnold!
- Sazz Pataki, a character on Only Murders in the Building

== See also ==
- Potok, Potocki (Slavic term)
