= National Route 935 (Costa Rica) =

National Road Route in Costa Rica

National Tertiary Route 935
- Ruta nacional terciaria 935

Route information
- Maintained by Ministry of Public Works and Transport
- Length: 16.285 km (10.119 mi)

Location
- Country: Costa Rica
- Provinces: Guanacaste

Highway system
- National Road Network of Costa Rica
← Route 934	→ Route 936

National Tertiary Route 935, or just Route 935 (Spanish: Ruta Nacional Terciaria 935, or Ruta 935) is a National Road Route of Costa Rica, located in the Guanacaste province.

== Description ==
In Guanacaste province the route covers La Cruz canton (La Cruz district).
