= National Route 933 (Costa Rica) =

National Road Route in Costa Rica

National Tertiary Route 933
- Ruta nacional terciaria 933

Route information
- Maintained by Ministry of Public Works and Transport
- Length: 6.130 km (3.809 mi)

Location
- Country: Costa Rica
- Provinces: Guanacaste

Highway system
- National Road Network of Costa Rica
← Route 931	→ Route 934

National Tertiary Route 933, or just Route 933 (Spanish: Ruta Nacional Terciaria 933, or Ruta 933) is a National Road Route of Costa Rica, located in the Guanacaste province.

== Description ==
In Guanacaste province the route covers Santa Cruz canton (Tempate, Cabo Velas districts).
