= National Route 910 (Costa Rica) =

National Road Route in Costa Rica

National Tertiary Route 910
- Ruta nacional terciaria 910

Route information
- Maintained by Ministry of Public Works and Transport
- Length: 9.345 km (5.807 mi)

Location
- Country: Costa Rica
- Provinces: Guanacaste

Highway system
- National Road Network of Costa Rica
← Route 909	→ Route 911

National Tertiary Route 910, or just Route 910 (Spanish: Ruta Nacional Terciaria 910, or Ruta 910) is a National Road Route of Costa Rica, located in the Guanacaste province.

== Description ==
In Guanacaste province the route covers Santa Cruz canton (Tempate and Cartagena districts).
