= Belén de Nosarita =

District in Nicoya canton, Guanacaste province, Costa Rica

- District
- Interactive map of Belén de Nosarita
- Belén de Nosarita district location in Costa Rica
- Coordinates: 9.9990872°N 85.5244884°W
- Country: Costa Rica
- Province: Guanacaste
- Canton: Nicoya
- Creation: 17 June 1994

Area
  - Total: 123 km^{2} (47 sq mi)
- Elevation: 153 m (502 ft)

Population (2011)
  - Total: 2,686
  - Density: 21.8/km^{2} (56.6/sq mi)
- Time zone: UTC−06:00
- Postal code: 50207

Belén de Nosarita is a district of the Nicoya canton, in the Guanacaste province of Costa Rica.

== History ==
Belén de Nosarita was created on 17 June 1994 by Ley 7415.

== Geography ==
Belén de Nosarita has an area of 123 km^{2} (47 sq mi) and an elevation of 153 metres.

== Locations ==
- Poblados: Arcos, Balsal, Caimitalito, Cuajiniquil, Cuesta Grande, Chumburán, Juntas, Maquenco, Minas, Miramar Sureste, Naranjal, Naranjalito, Nosarita, Platanillo, Quebrada Bonita, Santa Elena (part), Zaragoza

== Demographics ==
Historical population
Census	Pop.	±% p.a.
1883	676	—
2000	2,118	+0.98%
2011	2,686	+2.18%
2022	2,311	−1.36%
Source: Instituto Nacional de Estadística y Censos; Centro Centroamericano de Población

For the 2011 census, Belén de Nosarita had a population of 2,686 inhabitants.

== Transportation ==
=== Road transportation ===
The district is covered by the following road routes:

- National Route 150
