= Veintisiete de Abril District =

District in Santa Cruz canton, Guanacaste province, Costa Rica

Veintisiete de Abril
- District
- Veintisiete de Abril district
- Veintisiete de Abril district location in Costa Rica
- Coordinates: 10.2162537°N 85.7291641°W
- Country: Costa Rica
- Province: Guanacaste
- Canton: Santa Cruz

Area
  - Total: 301.59 km^{2} (116.44 sq mi)
- Elevation: 43 m (141 ft)

Population (2011)
  - Total: 7,048
  - Density: 23.37/km^{2} (60.53/sq mi)
- Time zone: UTC−06:00
- Postal code: 50303

Veintisiete de Abril is a district of the Santa Cruz canton, in the Guanacaste province of Costa Rica.

== Geography ==
Veintisiete de Abril has an area of 301.59 km^{2} (116.44 sq mi) and an elevation of 43 metres.

== Villages ==
Administrative center of the district is the village of Veintisiete de Abril.

Other villages in the district are Aguacate, Avellana, Barrosa, Brisas, Bruno, Cacaovano, Camones, Cañas Gordas, Ceiba Mocha, Cerro Brujo, Delicias, Espavelar, Florida, Gorgolona, Guachipelín, Guapote, Hatillo, Icacal, Isla Verde, Playa Junquillal, Junta de Río Verde, Mesas, Montaña, Monteverde, Níspero, Paraíso, Pargos, Pasa Hondo, Pilas, Playa Negra, Pochotes, Ranchos, Retallano (partly), Río Seco, Río Tabaco, San Francisco, San Jerónimo, Soncoyo, Tieso, Trapiche, Venado and Vergel.

== Demographics ==
Historical population
Census	Pop.	±% p.a.
1883	441	—
1927	2,516	+4.04%
1950	3,815	+1.83%
1963	8,475	+6.33%
1973	10,274	+1.94%
1984	6,890	−3.57%
2000	4,928	−2.07%
2011	7,048	+3.31%
2022	9,308	+2.56%
Source: Instituto Nacional de Estadística y Censos; Centro Centroamericano de Población

For the 2011 census, Veintisiete de Abril had a population of 7,048 inhabitants.

== Transportation ==
=== Road transportation ===
The district is covered by the following road routes:

- National Route 152
- National Route 160
- National Route 904
- National Route 909
- National Route 928
