= Zita Pataki =

Hungarian television presenter (born 1973)

- Born: 1 November 1973 (age 53); Gyöngyös, Hungary
- Occupation: Television presenter

Zita Pataki (born 1 November 1973) is a Hungarian television presenter, best known as the host of Class FM and is a meteorological news reporter on RTL Klub.
