= Tamarindo, Costa Rica =

District in Santa Cruz canton, Guanacaste province, Costa Rica

Tamarindo
- District
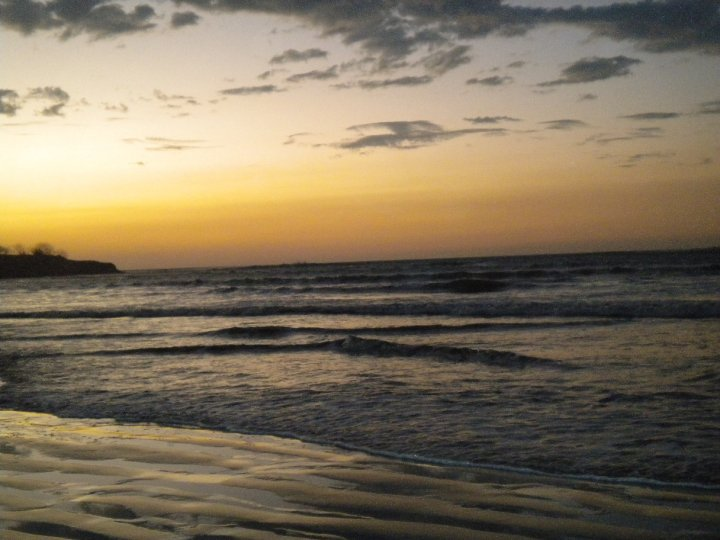
- The coastline in Tamarindo
- Tamarindo district
- Tamarindo district location in Costa Rica
- Coordinates: 10.2923417°N 85.798175°W
- Country: Costa Rica
- Province: Guanacaste
- Canton: Santa Cruz
- Creation: 27 November 1995

Area
  - Total: 125.86 km^{2} (48.59 sq mi)
- Elevation: 27 m (89 ft)

Population (2011)
  - Total: 6,375
  - Density: 50.65/km^{2} (131.2/sq mi)
- Time zone: UTC−06:00
- Postal code: 50309

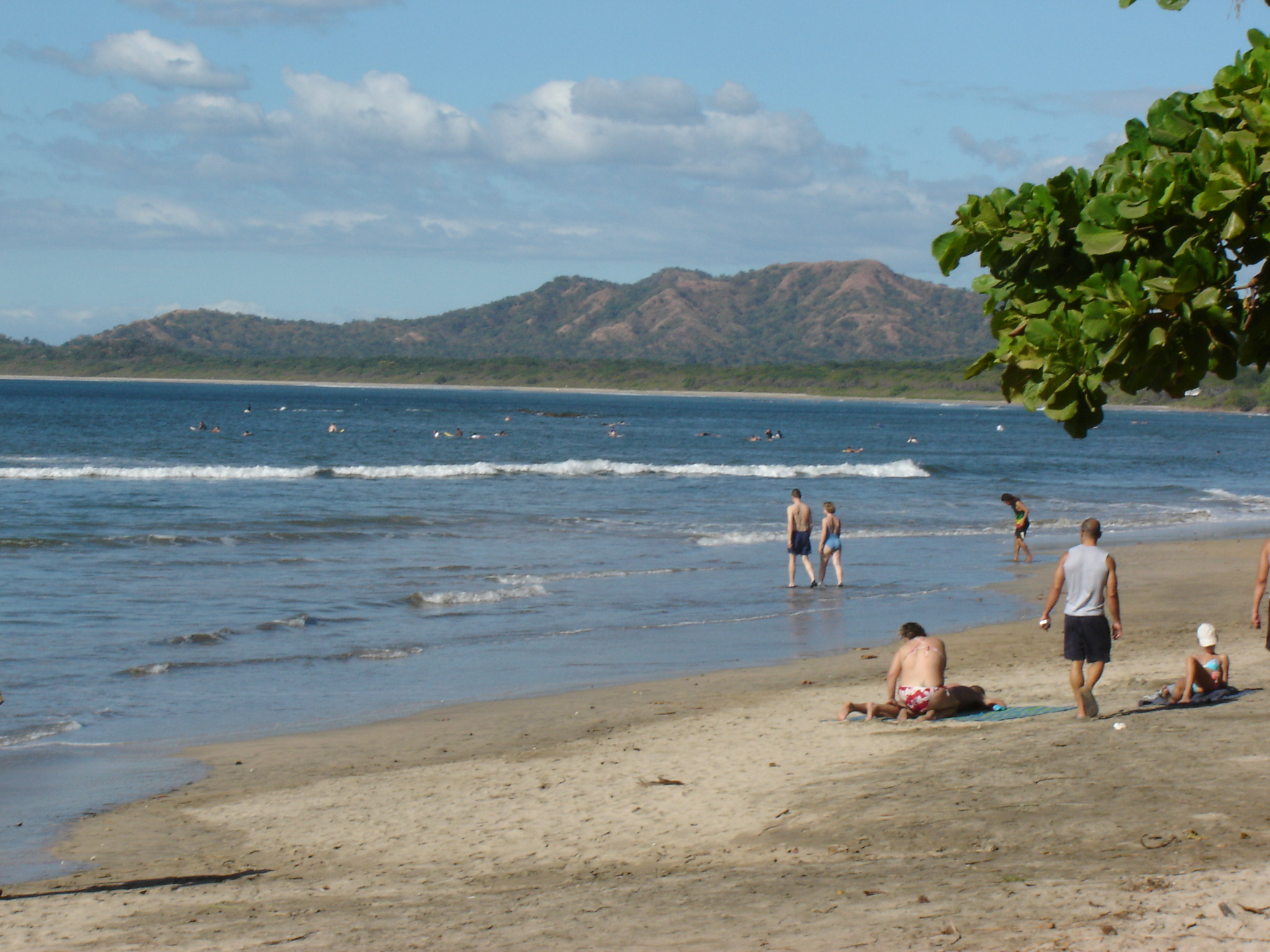
View of Tamarindo Beach.

Tamarindo is a district of the Santa Cruz canton, in the Guanacaste province of Costa Rica, located on the Nicoya Peninsula.

The town of Tamarindo is the largest developed beach town in Guanacaste. Once a small fishing village, it has boomed in the 21st century with surfing and eco-tourism, and is now popular with surfers, digital nomads, and expatriates.

== History ==
Tamarindo began as a small village of several families who largely depended on fishing.

In 1985, Texas businessman Russell Wenrich purchased land in the village of Tamarindo and began to develop beachside cabanas. Five years later, Wenrich met Robert August, star of the 1966 surfing documentary The Endless Summer, who moved to town. Still later, Wenrich persuaded the Costa Rican tourism agency to subsidize filming in Tamarindo for the 1994 sequel The Endless Summer II. This film, which began with scenes from Tamarindo, is generally credited for launching a tourism boom that transformed a small fishing village into the tourism center it is today.

Tamarindo was incorporated as a town on November 27, 1995, by Decreto Ejecutivo (English: Executive Order) 24820-G.

"Another watershed moment came in 2003 when the nearby airport at Liberia started handling international flights, putting the town within five hours reach of Miami," Wavelength magazine wrote in 2020.

In 2004, the town's beach was stripped of its Blue Flag designation for pollution. It regained the designation in 2006, but lost it again the following year after water-quality tests conducted by Costa Rica's National Water and Sewer Institute determined that some areas had more than 7,000 times the level of fecal matter considered safe by the U.S. Environmental Protection Agency. After years of work, the town reportedly regained the Blue Flag in 2018.

== Geography ==
Tamarindo has an area of 125.86 square kilometres (48.59 sq mi) and an elevation of 27 metres (89 ft).

The nearby Las Baulas National Marine Park is an important nesting site for the endangered leatherback sea turtle (Dermochelys coriacea).

== Settlements ==
Besides Tamarindo, towns in the district include Villarreal, Santa Rosa, Garita Nueva, Hernández, Hucus, Flamingo and San José de Pinilla.

=== Villareal ===
The nearby town of Villareal has a public elementary school and high school, two full-size soccer fields, multiple restaurants, two large stores, multiple hardware stores, a police station, a church, several car-repair shops, and a gas station.

=== Langosta ===
Just east of the centre of Tamarindo, there is a three-way intersection. To the left is the road that leads to the Banco Nacional de Costa Rica, and also a secondary exit from Tamarindo. To the right is the road that leads to Playa Langosta.

=== Playa Grande ===
To the north of Tamarindo is Playa Grande, typically accessed by crossing the marine park estuary via a water taxi, or via a 17km drive through Villareal.

== Tourism ==
=== Beaches ===
The beaches in the area are generally clean and recent efforts by the government and local business organizations are proving themselves. While the beach has not regained its Blue Flag Status, in September 2008 it did get a clean bill of health from the Costa Rican government. The town is trying to regain its Blue Flag Status.

=== Surfing ===
Tamarindo and nearby areas are very popular for surfing, and feature waves from beginner to advanced.

=== Fishing ===
Tamarindo is known for world-class fishing, and a variety of captains and charter services are available. Costa Rica requires a fishing license from the INCOPESCA (Instituto Costarricense de Pesca y Acuicultura), the government agency that manages, regulates and promotes fisheries and aquaculture.

=== Scuba ===
The Catalinas Islands are one of the most popular spots for scuba diving, due to its wide variety of sea life and its views.

=== Golf ===
Golf courses include the Hacienda Pinilla Golf Club, the Reserva Conchal Beach Resort, and Four Seasons Resort Peninsula Papagayo.

=== Culture and arts ===
There is a night market, food truck park, skate park, and features regular fire conclave performance shows at the beach.

Tamarindo is home to several electronic dance music festivals, including The BPM Festival and the Ocaso Underground Music Festival.

The town has a small gay bar.

== Weather ==
The town of Tamarindo has essentially two seasons: the wet, generally May to November; and the dry, December to April.

== Demographics ==
Historical population
| Census | Pop. | ±% p.a. |
|---|---|---|
| 2000 | 3,525 | — |
| 2011 | 6,375 | +5.53% |
| 2022 | 7,132 | +1.03% |
Source: Instituto Nacional de Estadística y Censos; Centro Centroamericano de Población

Tamarindo's population grew from 6,375 at the 2011 census to 7,861 in the 2020 census.

== Transportation ==
=== Road transportation ===
The district is served by:

- National Route 152
- National Route 155

=== Airport ===
Tamarindo is the most accessible location along the northern Pacific coast of Costa Rica with an airstrip.

Liberia International Airport is the closest international airport to Tamarindo, about an hour away.

=== Public transportation ===
There is a scheduled daily bus service to and from San José, as well as a paved highway to San José, with driving time of 3.5 to 6 hours depending on traffic.

== Gallery ==
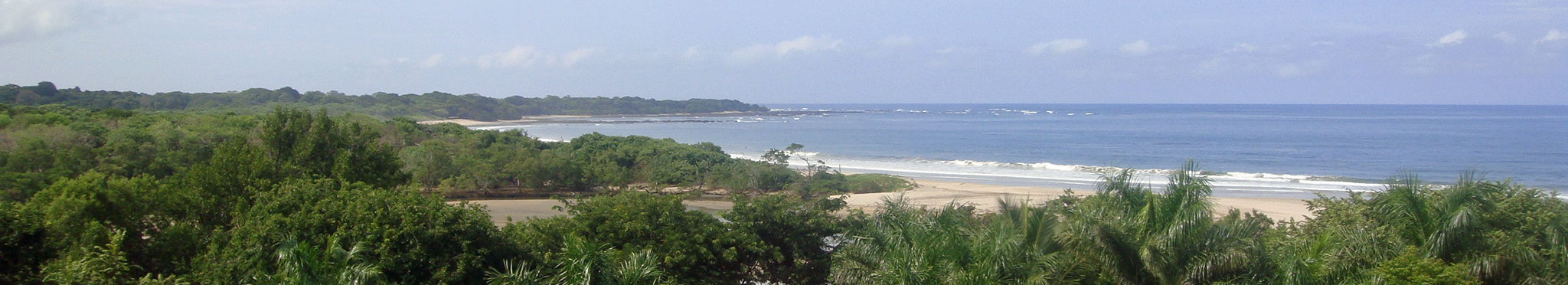
Panoramic view of Las Baulas National Marine Park and Playa Grande, located 2 km from downtown Tamarindo.

== See also ==
- Tourism in Costa Rica
