= Bolsón District =

District in Santa Cruz canton, Guanacaste province, Costa Rica

Bolsón
- District
- Interactive map of Bolsón
- Bolsón district location in Costa Rica
- Coordinates: 10.3489023°N 85.4603021°W
- Country: Costa Rica
- Province: Guanacaste
- Canton: Santa Cruz

Area
  - Total: 32.47 km^{2} (12.54 sq mi)
- Elevation: 13 m (43 ft)

Population (2011)
  - Total: 1,627
  - Density: 50.11/km^{2} (129.8/sq mi)
- Time zone: UTC−06:00
- Postal code: 50302

Bolsón is a district of the Santa Cruz canton, in the Guanacaste province of Costa Rica.

== Geography ==
Bolsón has an area of 32.47 km^{2} and an elevation of 13 metres.

== Villages ==
Administrative center of the district is the village of Bolsón.

Another village in the district is Lagartero.

== Demographics ==
Historical population
Census	Pop.	±% p.a.
1883	114	—
1927	1,559	+6.12%
1950	1,837	+0.72%
1963	2,979	+3.79%
1973	3,559	+1.79%
1984	1,314	−8.66%
2000	1,605	+1.26%
2011	1,627	+0.12%
2022	2,378	+3.51%
Source: Instituto Nacional de Estadística y Censos; Centro Centroamericano de Población

For the 2011 census, Bolsón had a population of 1,627 inhabitants.

== Transportation ==
=== Road transportation ===
The district is covered by the following road routes:

- National Route 920
