= Nicoya =

District in Nicoya canton, Guanacaste province, Costa Rica

- District
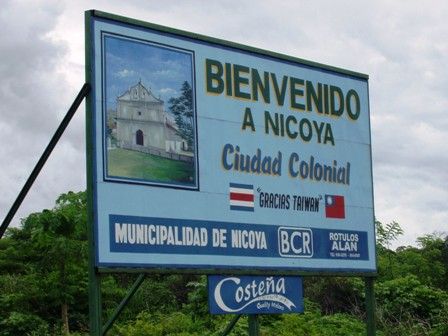

- Location in Costa Rica
- Coordinates: 10.1061593°N 85.486153°W
- Country: Costa Rica
- Province: Guanacaste Province
- Canton: Nicoya Canton
- Founded: 1523
- Joined Republic of Costa Rica: 1824-1825

Government
  - Mayor: Eduardo Gutiérrez Rosales

Area
  - Total: 310.61 km^{2} (119.93 sq mi)
- Elevation: 123 m (404 ft)
- Highest elevation: 123 m (404 ft)
- Lowest elevation: 3 m (9.8 ft)

Population (2011)
  - Total: 24,833
  - Density: 79.949/km^{2} (207.07/sq mi)
- Time zone: UTC−06:00
- Postal code: 50201

Nicoya is a district and head city of the Nicoya canton, in the Guanacaste province of Costa Rica, located on the Nicoya Peninsula. It is one of the country's most important tourist zones; it serves as a transport hub to Guanacaste's beaches and national parks.

== Geography ==
Nicoya has an area of 310.61 km^{2} and an elevation of 123 metres.

== Locations ==
- Barrios: Los Ángeles, Barro Negro, Cananga, Carmen, Chorotega, Guadalupe, Granja, San Martín, Santa Lucía, Virginia
- Poblados: Cabeceras, Caimital, Carreta, Casitas, Cerro Negro, Cerro Redondo, Cola de Gallo, Cuesta, Cuesta Buenos Aires, Curime, Chivo, Dulce Nombre, Esperanza Norte, Estrella, Gamalotal, Garcimuñóz, Guaitil, Guastomatal, Guineas, Hondores, Jobo, Juan Díaz, Lajas, Loma Caucela, Miramar (northwest), Nambí, Oriente, Los Planes, Pedernal, Picudas, Pilahonda, Pilas, Pilas Blancas, Piragua, Ponedero, Quirimán, Quirimancito, Sabana Grande, Santa Ana, Sitio Botija, Tierra Blanca, Tres Quebradas, Varillas (Zapotillo), Virginia, Zompopa

== Demographics ==
Historical population
Census	Pop.	±% p.a.
1883	769	—
1927	4,215	+3.94%
1950	10,693	+4.13%
1963	20,556	+5.16%
1973	20,915	+0.17%
1984	21,455	+0.23%
2000	20,945	−0.15%
2011	24,833	+1.56%
2022	33,316	+2.71%
Source: Instituto Nacional de Estadística y Censos; Centro Centroamericano de Población

For the 2011 census, Nicoya had a population of 24,833 inhabitants.

In early 2006, a group of researchers led by adventure writer Dan Buettner and supported by National Geographic Magazine, the National Institute on Aging, and Allianz Healthcare, designated Nicoya as a Blue Zone. This designation is granted to global regions that are characterized by the longest life expectancies. Among the ideal Nicoyan lifestyle characteristics cited by the research were the water's high calcium and magnesium content, intense daily physical activity, year-long fruit consumption, and close inter-generational relationships.

== Economy ==
As of 1850, Nicoya harvested pearls for export.

== Transportation ==
=== Road transportation ===
The district is covered by the following road routes:

- National Route 21
- National Route 150
- National Route 157
- National Route 905
- National Route 921

Route 21 is the main road serving Nicoya, connecting the city with Liberia (76 km, north-bound). On the opposite way, Route 21 also connects Nicoya to the rest of Nicoya Peninsula, including Pueblo Viejo (exit to Route 18, and then connecting to Route 1), on the main way to San José (204 km vía Route 1).

=== Airports ===
Nicoya has also an airport for domestic flights with no current scheduled services.

== Arts and culture ==
The town was built in an old colonial style, in the Cordillera Volcánica de Guanacaste. Agriculture and cattle form the backbone of the city's economy, as well as the province which surrounds it.

== Governance ==
While the town elected 61-year-old Lorenzo Rosales Vargas as mayor on December 3, 2006, he was only able to serve for about a year before quitting for health reasons. Since May 5, 2008 Eduardo Gutiérrez Rosales has been holding the office as Nicoya's first supply mayor. They are both members of the National Liberation Party (PLN).

== Sports ==
A.D. Guanacasteca is the city's major football team, having spent several years in the Costa Rican Primera División. In 2004, they sold their license and were moved away from Nicoya to become Brujas F.C., but were reformed a year later. They currently play their home games at Estadio Chorotega.

== Climate ==
This area typically has a pronounced dry season. According to the Köppen Climate Classification system, Nicoya has a tropical savanna climate, abbreviated "Aw" on climate maps.

Climate data for Nicoya
Month	Jan	Feb	Mar	Apr	May	Jun	Jul	Aug	Sep	Oct	Nov	Dec	Year
Mean daily maximum °C (°F)	33.0 (91.4)	34.2 (93.6)	35.5 (95.9)	35.9 (96.6)	33.9 (93.0)	32.3 (90.1)	32.4 (90.3)	32.9 (91.2)	32.3 (90.1)	31.7 (89.1)	31.8 (89.2)	32.2 (90.0)	33.2 (91.7)
Mean daily minimum °C (°F)	20.1 (68.2)	20.8 (69.4)	21.5 (70.7)	21.8 (71.2)	21.7 (71.1)	21.3 (70.3)	21.4 (70.5)	21.0 (69.8)	21.2 (70.2)	21.1 (70.0)	20.5 (68.9)	19.9 (67.8)	21.0 (69.8)
Average precipitation mm (inches)	4.2 (0.17)	7.7 (0.30)	22.4 (0.88)	62.1 (2.44)	264.2 (10.40)	310.4 (12.22)	247.0 (9.72)	305.9 (12.04)	389.2 (15.32)	391.4 (15.41)	122.3 (4.81)	21.4 (0.84)	2,148.2 (84.55)
Average precipitation days	0.7	0.6	1.7	4.8	14.4	18.1	14.2	17.1	20.5	20.8	9.2	2.1	124.2
Source: World Meteorological Organization (temperatures 1961–1984, precipitation 1949–2003)

== Education ==
- Liceo de Nicoya was founded in 1952. It's an academic high school, and it provides education to the whole canton of Nicoya.

== See also ==
- Blue zones
- Nicoya Peninsula
