= Mansión =

District in Nicoya canton, Guanacaste province, Costa Rica

- District
- Interactive map of Mansión
- Mansión district location in Costa Rica
- Coordinates: 10.1207792°N 85.3034909°W
- Country: Costa Rica
- Province: Guanacaste
- Canton: Nicoya

Area
  - Total: 212.47 km^{2} (82.04 sq mi)
- Elevation: 87 m (285 ft)

Population (2011)
  - Total: 5,717
  - Density: 26.91/km^{2} (69.69/sq mi)
- Time zone: UTC−06:00
- Postal code: 50202

Mansión is a district of the Nicoya canton, in the Guanacaste province of Costa Rica.

== Geography ==
Mansión has an area of 212.47 km^{2} (82.04 sq mi) and an elevation of 87 metres.

== Locations ==
- Poblados: Acoyapa, Boquete, Camarones, Guastomatal, Iguanita, Lapas, Limonal, Matambuguito, Matina, Mercedes, Monte Alto, Morote Norte, Nacaome, Obispo, Pital, Polvazales, Pueblo Viejo, Puente Guillermina, Puerto Jesús, Río Vueltas, San Joaquín, San Juan (part), Uvita (part), Vigía, Yerbabuena (part), Zapandí

== Demographics ==
Historical population
Census	Pop.	±% p.a.
1927	3,623	—
1950	14,418	+6.19%
1963	9,170	−3.42%
1973	4,928	−6.02%
1984	4,542	−0.74%
2000	4,663	+0.16%
2011	5,717	+1.87%
2022	6,398	+1.03%
Source: Instituto Nacional de Estadística y Censos; Centro Centroamericano de Población

For the 2011 census, Mansión had a population of 5,717 inhabitants.

== Transportation ==
=== Road transportation ===
The district is covered by the following road routes:

- National Route 18
- National Route 21
- National Route 157
- National Route 158
- National Route 905
