= Santiago Vecino =

Uruguayan artist

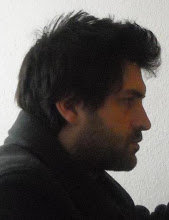
Santiago Vecino in 2009

Santiago Vecino is a Uruguayan illustrator also known as Caveman. Santiago Vecino is a versatile artist, skilled in drawing, playing music, singing, and dancing. However, he is best known for his role as a concept and storyboard artist for the Hollywood film Evil Dead (2013 film), directed by fellow Uruguayan Fede Álvarez.

== Work ==
Santiago was born in 1978 in the city of Montevideo. He has been drawing since early childhood. After finishing high school, he studied architecture for two years until he realized that he wanted to explore deeply his artistic side and started fine arts at the IENBA art school (2000). He also took courses in graphic design and animation. After a couple years, he started working professionally as an illustrator and kept on learning by himself until today. He has been drawing children illustrations, caricatures, graphic humor, animation, storyboards, concept art, matte painting, etc., for different worldwide clients. Parallel to his professional career, he keeps on exploring his own art projects. In 2012 he worked as a conceptual and storyboard artist for two upcoming Hollywood films, Evil Dead (2013 film) and Aztec Warrior.
