= Tempate =

District in Santa Cruz canton, Guanacaste province, Costa Rica

- District
- Tempate district
- Tempate district location in Costa Rica
- Coordinates: 10.3950191°N 85.745226°W
- Country: Costa Rica
- Province: Guanacaste
- Canton: Santa Cruz

Area
  - Total: 129.95 km^{2} (50.17 sq mi)
- Elevation: 62 m (203 ft)

Population (2011)
  - Total: 5,630
  - Density: 43.3/km^{2} (112/sq mi)
- Time zone: UTC−06:00
- Postal code: 50304

Tempate is a district of the Santa Cruz canton, in the Guanacaste province of Costa Rica.

== Geography ==
Tempate has an area of 129.95 km^{2} (50.17 sq mi) and an elevation of 62 metres.

== Villages ==
Administrative center of the district is the village of Tempate.

Other villages in the district are Cañafístula, Chiles, Higuerón, Huacas, Jobo, Llano, Paraíso, Portegolpe and Potrero.

== Demographics ==
Historical population
Census	Pop.	±% p.a.
1883	651	—
1927	2,339	+2.95%
1950	2,731	+0.68%
1963	4,094	+3.16%
1973	3,267	−2.23%
1984	3,371	+0.29%
2000	3,395	+0.04%
2011	5,630	+4.71%
2022	8,136	+3.40%
Source: Instituto Nacional de Estadística y Censos; Centro Centroamericano de Población

For the 2011 census, Tempate had a population of 5,630 inhabitants.

== Transportation ==
=== Road transportation ===
The district is covered by the following road routes:

- National Route 155
- National Route 180
- National Route 909
- National Route 910
- National Route 911
- National Route 933
