= National Route 150 (Costa Rica) =

National Road Route in Costa Rica

National Secondary Route 150
- Ruta nacional secundaria 150

Route information
- Maintained by Ministry of Public Works and Transport
- Length: 61.945 km (38.491 mi)

Location
- Country: Costa Rica
- Provinces: Guanacaste

Highway system
- National Road Network of Costa Rica
← Route 149	→ Route 151

National Secondary Route 150, or just Route 150 (Spanish: Ruta Nacional Secundaria 150, or Ruta 150) is a National Road Route of Costa Rica located in the Guanacaste province.

== Description ==
In Guanacaste province the route covers Nicoya canton (Nicoya, San Antonio, Sámara, Belén de Nosarita districts).
