= Santa Cruz (canton), Costa Rica =

Canton in Guanacaste province, Costa Rica

Santa Cruz
- Canton
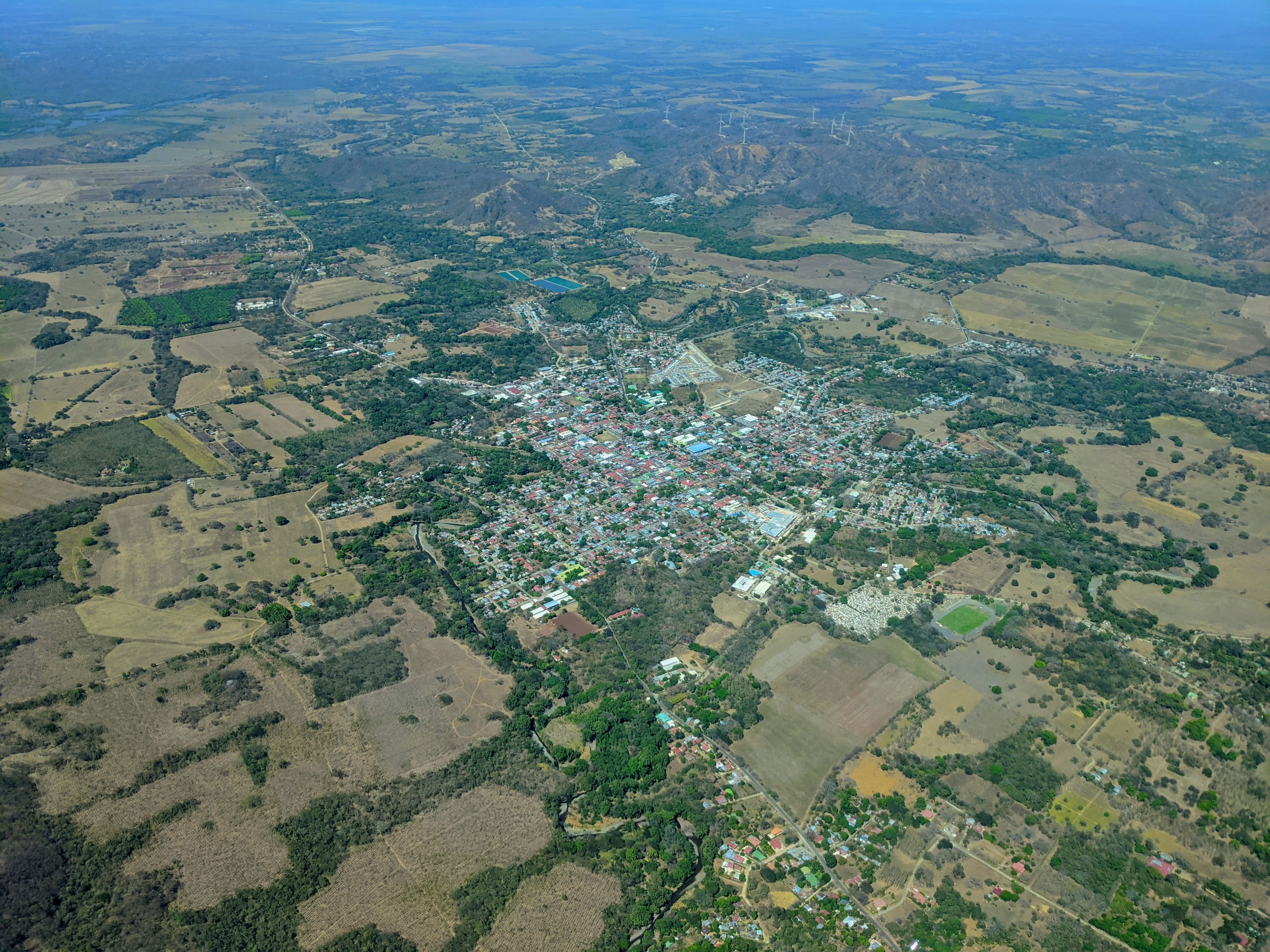
- The town of Santa Cruz, administrative center of the canton and district of Santa Cruz

- Flag
- Santa Cruz canton
- Santa Cruz canton location in Costa Rica
- Coordinates: 10.2357596°N 85.6407774°W
- Country: Costa Rica
- Province: Guanacaste
- Creation: 7 December 1848
- Head city: Santa Cruz
- Districts: Districts: Santa Cruz; Bolsón; Veintisiete de Abril; Tempate; Cartagena; Cuajiniquil; Diriá; Cabo Velas; Tamarindo

Government
  - Type: Municipality
  - Body: Municipalidad de Santa Cruz

Area
  - Total: 1,312.27 km^{2} (506.67 sq mi)
- Elevation: 39 m (128 ft)

Population (2011)
  - Total: 55,104
  - Density: 41.991/km^{2} (108.76/sq mi)
- Time zone: UTC−06:00
- Canton code: 503
- Website: santacruz.go.cr

Santa Cruz is a canton in the Guanacaste province of Costa Rica. The head city is in Santa Cruz district.

== History ==
Santa Cruz was created on 7 December 1848 by decree 167.

On September 5, 2012, Santa Cruz was struck by a magnitude 7.6 earthquake, destroying houses in the canton.

== Geography ==
Santa Cruz has an area of 1,312.27 km^{2} (506.67 sq mi) and a mean elevation of 39 metres.

The heart-shaped canton is on the northern Pacific coast between Potrero Bay to the north and the mouth of the Montaña River to the south. It includes Velas Cape, the furthermost western point on the Nicoya Peninsula. The Tempisque River delineates a small portion of the eastern border.

== Districts ==
The canton of Santa Cruz is subdivided into the following districts:

1. Santa Cruz
2. Bolsón
3. Veintisiete de Abril
4. Tempate
5. Cartagena
6. Cuajiniquil
7. Diriá
8. Cabo Velas
9. Tamarindo

== Demographics ==
Historical population
| Census | Pop. | ±% p.a. |
|---|---|---|
| 1864 | 3,217 | — |
| 1883 | 4,748 | +2.07% |
| 1892 | 5,948 | +2.54% |
| 1927 | 10,390 | +1.61% |
| 1950 | 13,615 | +1.18% |
| 1963 | 23,576 | +4.31% |
| 1973 | 29,739 | +2.35% |
| 1984 | 31,133 | +0.42% |
| 2000 | 40,821 | +1.71% |
| 2011 | 55,104 | +2.77% |
| 2022 | 72,366 | +2.51% |
Source: Instituto Nacional de Estadística y Censos; Centro Centroamericano de Población

For the 2011 census, Santa Cruz had a population of 55,104 inhabitants.

== Transportation ==
=== Road transportation ===
The canton is covered by the following road routes:

- National Route 21
- National Route 152
- National Route 155
- National Route 160
- National Route 180
- National Route 904
- National Route 909
- National Route 910
- National Route 911
- National Route 920
- National Route 928
- National Route 931
- National Route 933

== Festivals ==
The capital city of Santa Cruz, named Santa Cruz, is a typical Costa Rican rural town. Its inhabitants are very diverse and consist mostly of farmers, fishermen, workers or employees of several of the many hotels located in the vicinity. The town is known within Costa Rica for its cultural heritage and many historical traditions. These traditions include the Fiesta de Semana Santa (Easter week celebration) and the traditional bullfights as well as many others.

Every year in Santa Cruz there are a number of festivals which include bull riding ceremonies. These ceremonies, though traditional at heart, lack most of the features seen in Spanish bullfighting traditions. Usually the ring in which the bull is let loose is open to anyone, tourists as well as locals – man, woman or child. The bull riding usually starts with a man being placed on the bull with nothing but a string to hold on to. This man is inevitably, after some time, thrown off. Even though there are always medical personnel in place to supervise the bull riding, severe injuries or even death among the bullriders are not uncommon.

The bulls are treated with respect and dignity and in no bullring within Costa Rica is it ever alright to deliberately injure or kill a bull in a bullfight, whereas in Spain or Mexico the very purpose of the bullfight is for a trained professional to kill the bull.

The canton also includes the town of Santa Bárbara, known for its traditional annual dance of the calabashes (baile de los guacales). Since 2000 the activity has been considered of cultural interest to the community and all participants receive a hand-painted calabash vessel to thank them for their economic contribution (which they paid in the form of an entrance ticket).
