= Guanacaste Conservation Area =

Conservation area in northern Costa Rica

- Área de Conservación Guanacaste
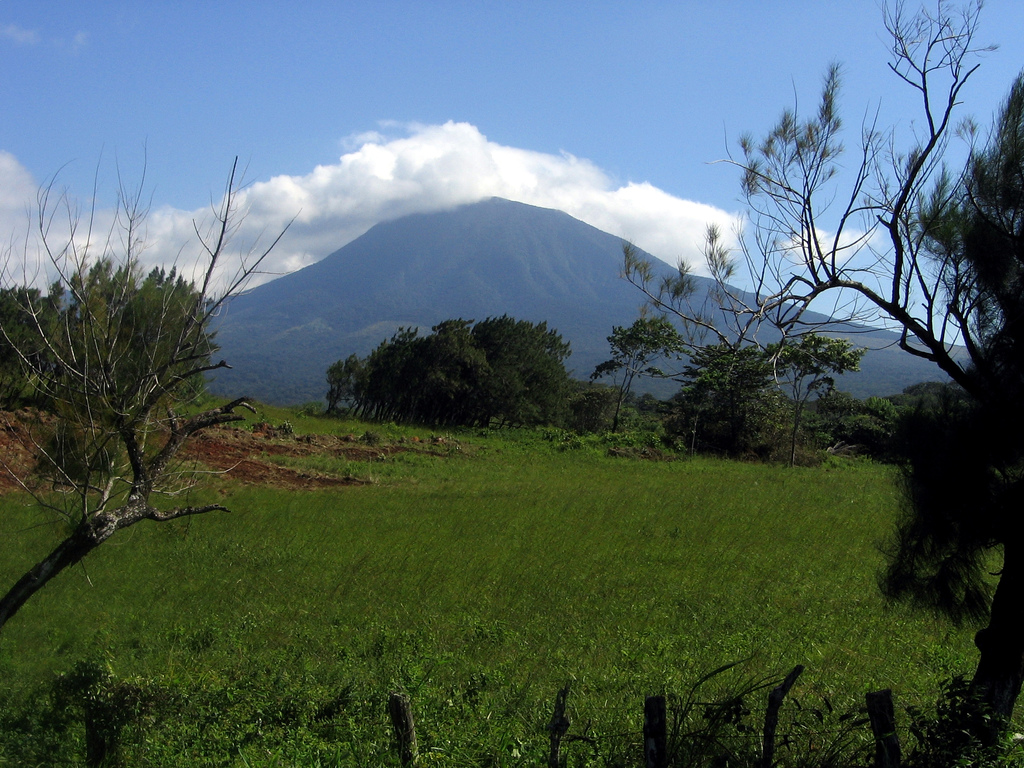
- Rincón de la Vieja Volcano

- Location of the area, labeled ACG in the northwest of the country.
- Location: Guanacaste Province, Costa Rica
- Nearest city: Liberia
- Coordinates: 10°51′N 85°37′W
- Area: 1,470 square kilometres (570 sq mi)
- Established: 1989
- Governing body: National System of Conservation Areas (SINAC)

UNESCO World Heritage Site
- Official name: Area de Conservación Guanacaste
- Type: Natural
- Criteria: ix, x
- Designated: 1999 (23rd session)
- Reference no.: 928bis
- Region: Latin America and the Caribbean
- Extensions: 2004

Guanacaste Conservation Area is an administrative area which is managed by the Sistema Nacional de Areas de Conservacion (SINAC) of Costa Rica for conservation in the northwestern part of Costa Rica. It contains three national parks, as well as wildlife refuges and other nature reserves. The area contains the Area de Conservación Guanacaste World Heritage Site, which comprises four areas.

== Protected areas ==
- Border Corridor Wildlife Refuge
- Guanacaste National Park
- Horizontes Experimental Forest
- Iguanita Wildlife Refuge
- Junquillal Bay Wildlife Refuge
- Rincón de la Vieja National Park
- Santa Elena Bay Management Marine Area
- Santa Rosa National Park
- Zapandí Riverine Wetlands

== Geography ==
The Guanacaste Conservation Area, located in Northwest Costa Rica, is a 163,000 hectares (630 mi^{2}) expanse of protected land and sea. It extends from 19 kilometres (12 mi) out in the Pacific Ocean to about 105 kilometres (65 mi) inland, ending in the Costa Rican lowlands near the Atlantic Ocean.

=== Terrestrial areas ===
Across this large area, four of the five major tropical ecosystems are found: marine/coastal, dry forest, rainforest, and cloud forest. Desert is the only ecosystem type not represented. This protected area contains the largest amount of dry forest from Mexico to Panama. The area's altitude ranges from sea level to 1,916 metres (6,286 ft) above sea level at the peak of the dormant Santa María volcano. Four other volcanoes are found in the entire Guanacaste Conservation Area: the Cacoa, Orosí, and Rincón de la Vieja volcanoes are active, while the Cerro Von Seebach volcano lies dormant.

=== Aquatic areas ===
There are at least 32 rivers and 16 streams that originate close to the Rincón de la Vieja volcano and flow into the Tempisque River watershed. As part of the Zapandí Riverine Wetlands reserve, this watershed is of great ecological and agricultural value, providing habitat for aquatic organisms and a source of irrigation for farming land. Other aquatic and semi-aquatic areas that the Guanacaste Conservation Area span are open marine zones, marine islands, many of which are uninhabited, rocky coasts, dune systems, and beaches, including 20 kilometers (12 mi) of sea turtle nesting grounds.

Areas of unique value are the Bahía Potrero Grande and the Laguna Respingue located in the southern peninsula of Santa Elena. These wetlands have both been listed as important sites by The Convention on Wetlands of International Importance, or the Ramsar Convention. Bahía Potrero Grande is the only intact mangrove ecosystem throughout the dry forest of Central America's Pacific coast, and Laguna Respingue is the only freshwater lake proximate to the ocean throughout Costa Rica and Central America's Pacific north.

=== Land use ===
Guanacaste Conservation Area is a conglomeration of several national parks and other natural areas. Over time, more areas have been protected as the ecological importance and uniqueness of different ecosystems were realized. Much of the acquired land was subjected to human use for around 400 years. Such activities included deforestation, agriculture, hunting, and animal grazing. A major issue with this was fire spreading from the new grasslands that resulted from land clearing to the remaining tropical dry forest fragments. Today, the Guanacaste area has experienced some successful secondary forest re-growth. After forests were heavily felled due to increased colonization and a growing beef industry between the 1950s and 1980s, Guanacaste tropical dry forest cover expanded to 47.9% in 2005.

=== Formation ===
Guanacaste Conservation Area started with the creation of the 10,400-acre (4,200 ha) Santa Rosa National Park in 1971 under the Executive Decree 1562-A/71. In 1973, the Rincón de la Vieja National Park was created under law No. 5398. In 1988, Junquillal Bay Wildlife Refuge was donated and incorporated into the conservation area. Originally proposed by Daniel H. Janzen and his wife, Winnie Hallwachs, in 1986, Guanacaste National Park was established in 1989 by Executive Decree 19124-MIRENEM/89. 1989 also saw the creation of Área de Conservación Guanacaste. This area is composed of Santa Rosa National Park, Rincón de la Vieja National Park, Junquillal Bay Wildlife Refuge, and Guanacaste National Park. The most recent addition to this grouping is the Santa Elena Sector, added in 2004. The ACG was legally added as a part of the National System of Conservation Areas in 1994 by Executive Decree 22909.

The entire Guanacaste Conservation Area has had more additions to it throughout its history. In 1987, the Murciélago Islands archipelago and 6 kilometers (3.7 mi) of ocean extending out from the Santa Elena Peninsula were also protected. Also in 1987 was the incorporation of 7,000 hectares (27 mi^{2}) of donated experimental forest stations. Further adding to the protected area was the acquisition of 2,000 acres (810 ha) of farms with forests and pastures between the Cacao and Rincón de la Vieja volcanos. This great level of historical (and ongoing) land acquisition results in the Guanacaste Conservation Area housing a plethora of plant and animals species; it is approximated that it protects approximately 2.4% of the world's terrestrial biodiversity (around 375,000 species).

The Área de Conservación Guanacaste has been praised by scientists as a successful example of upgrading protected areas, a process in which conservation areas are expanded via the acquisition of new territory while also providing benefits to neighboring communities of people.

== Local flora and fauna ==
=== Fauna ===
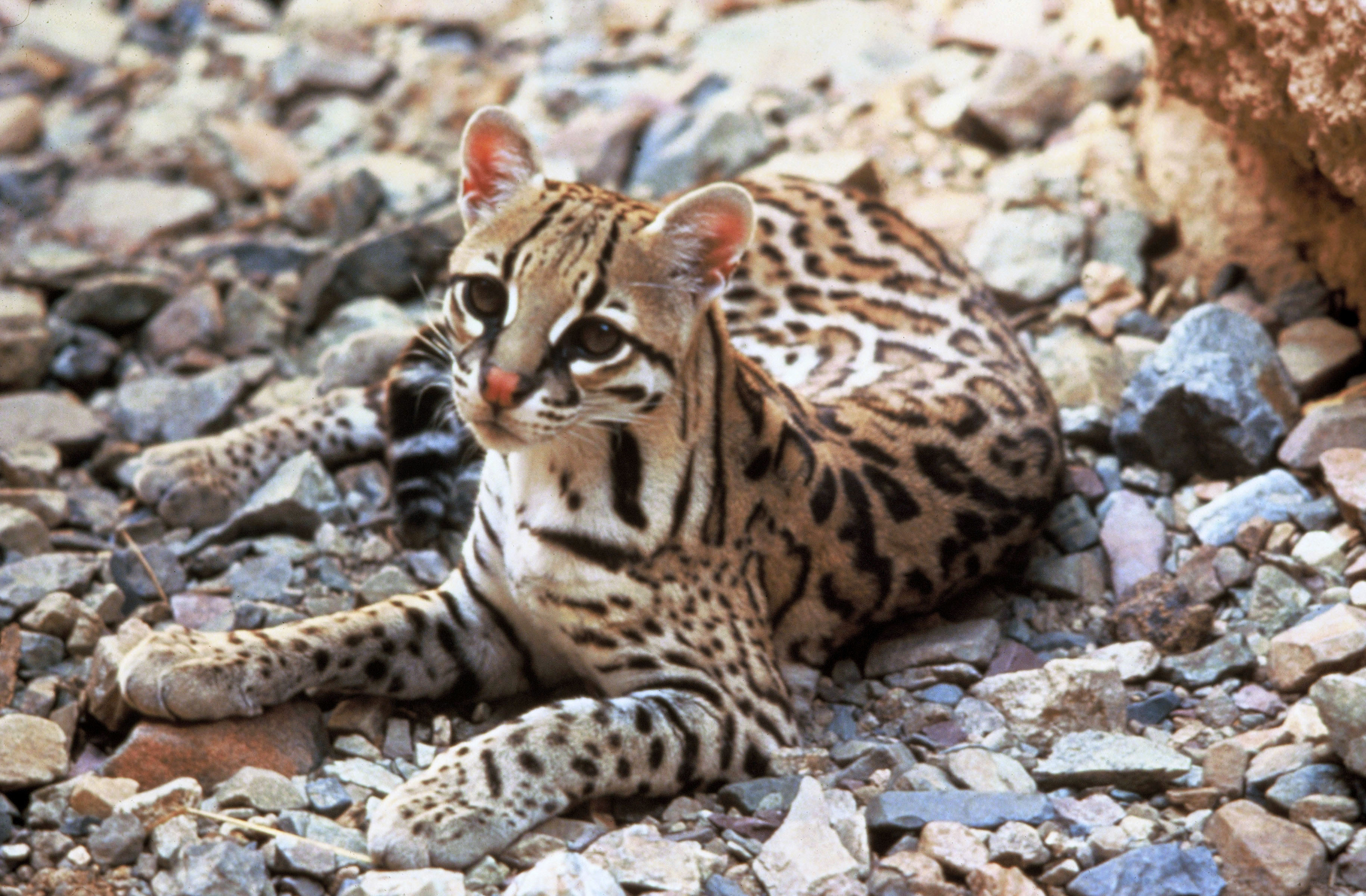
Ocelot

The Guanacaste Conservation Area has a highly diverse set of fauna. There are about 500 bird species, 100 reptile species and an estimated 140 species of mammals, 40 of which are bat species. Invertebrate diversity is also very high in this area; as of 2014 it was estimated that there were 20,000 species of beetles, 8,000 species of butterflies and moths, and 13,000 species of ants, bees and wasps present.

Some of the mammal species present include the Central American tapir, jaguar, margay, ocelot, jaguarundi, white-faced capuchin, howler monkey, spider monkey, collared anteater, white-lipped peccary, collared peccary and ring-tailed coati. The Central American tapir, also known as Baird’s tapir, has a conservation status of endangered and the white-lipped peccary is considered vulnerable.

Some bird species present include the keel-billed toucan, elegant trogon, white-throated magpie-jay, blue-winged teal, laughing falcon, mangrove hummingbird, great curassow, jabiru, roseate spoonbill and the scarlet macaw. Both the military macaw and the great curassow have a conservation status of vulnerable. The mangrove hummingbird is considered endangered.

Some interesting reptile species that inhabit this area include the American crocodile, spectacled caiman, the critically endangered leatherback sea turtle, and the vulnerable olive ridley sea turtle.

Rare species include a fish in the genus Poeciliopsis described in 2008; this freshwater species is endemic to the Potrero Grande river system.

=== Flora ===
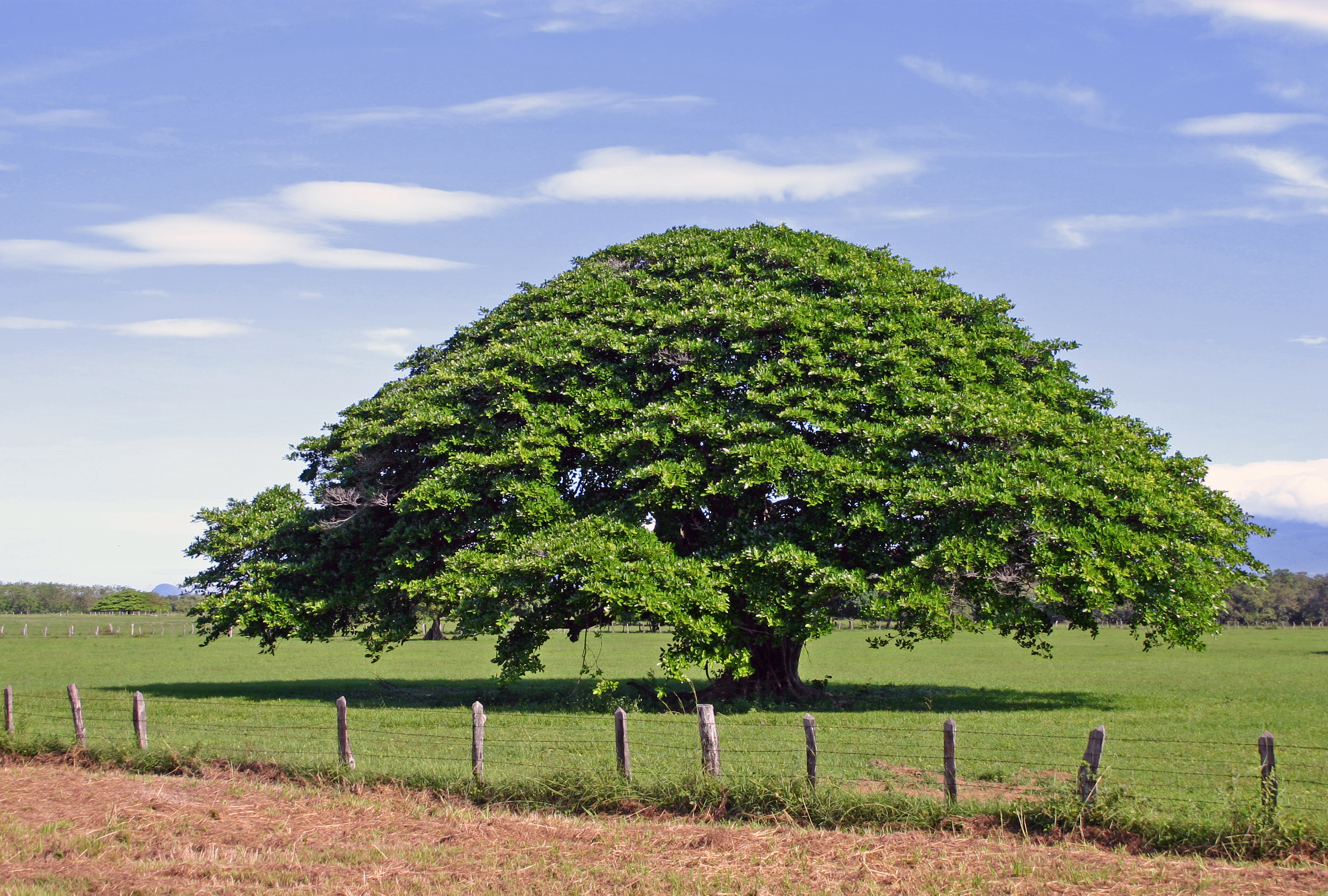
Arbol de Higueron, Ficus aurea

Alongside the diverse fauna, a highly diverse flora is also present in the conservation area. It is estimated that there are over 7,000 species of plants in this area. Of them, about 3,000 species are orchids and other epiphytic plants. The most notable species present is probably the Guanacaste tree, Enterolobium cyclocarpum, which is Costa Rica’s national tree. Many types of plant communities make up the conservation area. These communities include mangroves, lowland rainforest, cloud forest, dry forest, savannah, oak forest, evergreen gallery forest, and pre-montane humid forest.

Part of the conservation area is composed of dry forest habitat. The majority of the trees in this area (80%) will drop their leaves during the dry season. These trees will remain bare for three to five months. The leaf litter provides nutrients and habitat on the forest floor which leads to a higher diversity of species. In recent decades, there have been efforts to restore dry forest habitats in the province of Guanacaste, Costa Rica, which is where the conservation area is located.

== Conservation efforts ==
=== World Heritage Site ===
In 1999, the area was admitted as a World Heritage Site by UNESCO. According to UNESCO, "it contains important natural habitats for the conservation of biological diversity, including the best dry forest habitats from Central America to northern Mexico and key habitats for endangered or rare plant and animal species. The site demonstrates significant ecological processes in both its terrestrial and marine coastal environments."

=== Biological Education Program ===
The Guanacaste Conservation Area provides students with the opportunity to learn about three different types of ecosystems and the living organisms that inhabit these places. Dry forest, coastal region, and wet forest are among the different ecosystems that Guanacaste has to offer for the Biological Education Program. Neighboring schools take scheduled visits to the conservation area for the sole purpose of acquiring knowledge by hands-on learning. The program works with 53 surrounding schools, with most park visitors being in grades 4th through 6th. The goal of this program is for humans to coexist with their biological surroundings, and for people to use personal experience to become more sensitive to the importance of biology and ecology.

=== Marine Biosensitivity Program ===
The Marine Biosensitivity Program at Guanacaste Conservation Area introduces students to marine life through interactive studies and instructs them on how to conserve and improve the aquatic environment. Summer camps are held between January and April at the bat sector. This area is great for river and beach access, as well as being rich with resources that help with certain educational activities. Researching specific marine species and learning the natural history of the living organisms in the area are a few of the many activities that students participate in to engage with their surroundings.

=== Environmental Education Program ===
The purpose of the program is to use education to instill the ideas of environmental conservation and protection in students. Workshops are provided for students to create and plan different projects that aim to preserve the tropical forests. Some projects that have been conducted include science fairs, waste separation, and the use of waste materials in arts and crafts. Each project is either centered around or develops, a topic that deals with the environment. Some topics include the importance of water, recycling, and natural resources.

=== Ecotourism program ===
The ecotourism program allows visitors to explore the area of Guanacaste and its attractions while learning about the conservation of the ecosystems. The program aims to make tourism a part of the conservation effort, while also informing visitors of the biodiversity that the park has to offer. Planning and management examine tourist sites to fit the needs of both the tourists and the environment. The information section writes brochures and pamphlets that visitors can use while exploring the conservation area. With the efforts put in by both management and tourists, Guanacaste Conservation Area can use its natural surroundings for both pleasurable and educational purposes.

=== Research program ===
The ACG has a research program that is intended to help researchers on their scientific projects. The research program allows people to use the conservation area to study organisms and their habitat as long as they abide by the rules of protection. Any research project is welcome to the program, and at least 20 projects are started every year. There are two coordinators of the park who support and guide students, and researchers, on their projects. By working with researchers that study in Guanacaste, the people from the park gain new knowledge and scientific information in conservation efforts, as well as biodiversity, every year. A volunteer organization, known as Investigadores ACG (iACG), also helps individuals in their research process by providing online tools and information about the Conservation area.

Other programs that are a part of the conservation area include the Fire Protection program and the Restoration and Forestry Program. The Fire Protection program works to protect the natural resources of the park, as well as stop fires in the protected areas. The purpose of the Restoration and Forestry program is to conserve different plant species and to reforest parts of the conservation area that have been burned or damaged by outside factors.
