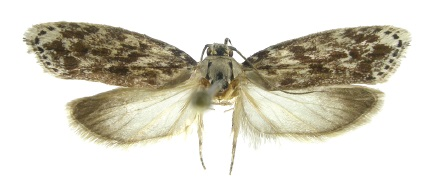

Scientific classification
- Domain: Eukaryota
- Kingdom: Animalia
- Phylum: Arthropoda
- Class: Insecta
- Order: Lepidoptera
- Family: Depressariidae
- Genus: Ethmia
- Species: E. billalleni

Binomial name
- Ethmia billalleni Phillips, 2014

= Ethmia billalleni =

Species of moth

Ethmia billalleni is a moth in the family Depressariidae. It is found in Costa Rica, where it has been recorded from middle elevations at the Cordillera de Guanacaste. The habitat consists of rain forests.

The length of the forewings is 9.4–10.3 mm (0.37–0.41 in) for males and 11.3–11.8 mm (0.44–0.46 in) for females. The ground color of the forewings is whitish, covered by irregular, dark brownish longitudinal streaks and spots except at the dorsal area before the middle. The area below the apex is paler, crossed by an elongate blotch. The hindwing ground color is whitish basally, becoming light brown at the apical area and along the dorsal margin.

== Etymology ==
The species is named in honor of Bill Allen for his accurate, detailed and continual documentation and on-site reporting on the germination and growth of Area de Conservación Guanacaste for almost three decades.
