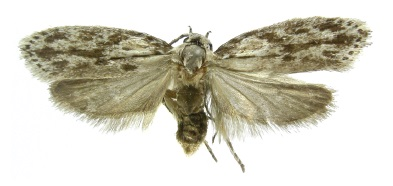

Scientific classification
- Domain: Eukaryota
- Kingdom: Animalia
- Phylum: Arthropoda
- Class: Insecta
- Order: Lepidoptera
- Family: Depressariidae
- Genus: Ethmia
- Species: E. johnpringlei

Binomial name
- Ethmia johnpringlei Phillips, 2014

= Ethmia johnpringlei =

Species of moth

Ethmia johnpringlei is a moth in the family Depressariidae. It is found in northern Costa Rica, where it has been recorded from the western sides of the Cordillera de Guanacaste at altitudes between 300 and 600 meters (980 and 1,970 ft). The habitat consists of dry forests and rain forests.

The length of the forewings is 7.1–7.8 mm (0.28–0.31 in) for males and 7.9–8.3 mm (0.31–0.33 in) for females. The ground color of the forewings is grayish with a series of elongated dark markings, the most conspicuous being an oblique line originating at the costa before the middle reaching a longitudinal line that runs from the middle to near the termen. There are three irregular black dots on the posterior half. The hindwing ground color is white.

== Etymology ==
The species is named in honor of John Pringle, a member of the small group of academic faculty who have supported Area de Conservación Guanacaste's land purchase for permanent conservation.
