= Guanacaste =

Guanacaste can refer to:

- Guanacaste (tree), the common tropical American tree Enterolobium cyclocarpum

== Places ==
=== Belize ===
- Guanacaste National Park (Belize), a small national park in Belize

=== Costa Rica ===
- Guanacaste Province, a province of Costa Rica
- Guanacaste National Park (Costa Rica), a small national park in Costa Rica
- Guanacaste Cordillera a mountain range in Costa Rica
