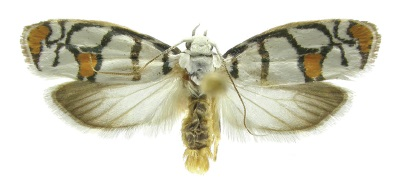

Scientific classification
- Domain: Eukaryota
- Kingdom: Animalia
- Phylum: Arthropoda
- Class: Insecta
- Order: Lepidoptera
- Family: Depressariidae
- Genus: Ethmia
- Species: E. blaineorum

Binomial name
- Ethmia blaineorum Phillips, 2014

= Ethmia blaineorum =

Species of moth

Ethmia blaineorum is a moth in the family Depressariidae. It is found in Costa Rica, where it has been recorded from the Pacific side of Cordillera de Guanacaste at altitudes ranging from sea level to 600 meters. The habitat consists of dry forests.

The length of the forewings is 8.3–8.6 mm (0.33–0.34 in). The ground color of the forewings is white with three distinct brownish lines and a large, square, bright ocherous patch. The apical and terminal areas have a broad, triangular, bright ocherous patch. The terminal area has an open circle composed by five brownish radiating arms. The hindwing ground color is whitish, becoming brownish near the base.

== Etymology ==
The species is named in honor of Joan and Anne Blaine of Kennett Square, Pennsylvania, for being early major donors for the Area de Conservacion Guanacaste rain forest purchase.
