= Rolepa nigrostriga =

Scientific classification
- Domain: Eukaryota
- Kingdom: Animalia
- Phylum: Arthropoda
- Class: Insecta
- Order: Lepidoptera
- Family: Phiditiidae
- Genus: Rolepa
- Species: R. nigrostriga

Binomial name
- Rolepa nigrostriga Schaus, 1920

Species of moth

Rolepa nigrostriga is a moth in the Phiditiidae family. It was described by William Schaus in 1920.

== Specimen use ==
Specimens of the moth are held in various research facilities such as depositories on Area de Conservación Guanacaste (Costa Rica), University of Pennsylvania (United States) and genetic sequencing labs in Biodiversity Institute of Ontario (Canada).
