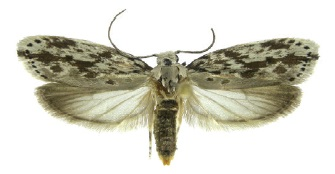

Scientific classification
- Domain: Eukaryota
- Kingdom: Animalia
- Phylum: Arthropoda
- Class: Insecta
- Order: Lepidoptera
- Family: Depressariidae
- Genus: Ethmia
- Species: E. turnerorum

Binomial name
- Ethmia turnerorum Phillips, 2014

= Ethmia turnerorum =

Species of moth

Ethmia turnerorum is a moth in the family Depressariidae. It is found in Costa Rica, where it has been recorded from both sides of the Cordillera Volcánica de Guanacaste at altitudes ranging from 242 to 832 meters (794 to 2,730 ft). The habitat consists of dry forests and rain forests.

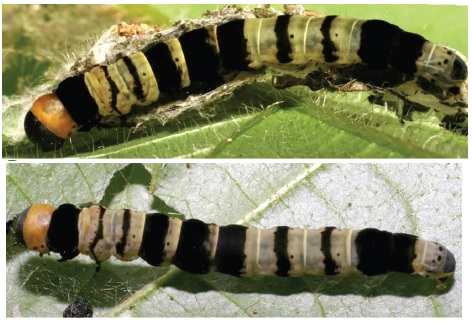
Larva

The length of the forewings is 10.2–10.6 mm (0.40–0.42 in) for males and 10.3–10.7 mm (0.41–0.42 in) for females. The ground color of the forewings is whitish with blackish markings and two distinct spots at the base. There is an oblique irregular dark blotch from before the middle below the costa connecting with an elongated dark mark from the middle to the termen. The hindwing ground colour is whitish, but darker at the margins.

The larvae feed on Cordia panamensis.

== Etymology ==
The species is named in honor of J. D. and Nancy Turner for funding the BioLep building in the Área de Conservación Guanacaste Administration Área in Sector Santa Rosa.
