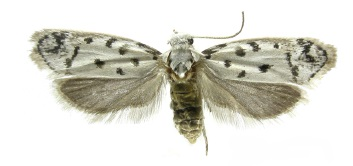

Scientific classification
- Domain: Eukaryota
- Kingdom: Animalia
- Phylum: Arthropoda
- Class: Insecta
- Order: Lepidoptera
- Family: Depressariidae
- Genus: Ethmia
- Species: E. helenmillerae

Binomial name
- Ethmia helenmillerae Phillips, 2014

= Ethmia helenmillerae =

Species of moth

Ethmia helenmillerae is a moth in the family Depressariidae. It is found in Costa Rica, where it has been recorded from the Pacific slope of the Cordillera de Guanacaste at altitudes ranging from 0 to 579 meters (0 to 1,900 ft). The habitat consists of dry forests.

The length of the forewings is 6.3–6.8 mm (0.25–0.27 in) for males and 6.5–7.5 mm (0.26–0.30 in) for females. The ground color of the forewings is white with six defined dots distributed on two-thirds from the base. There is a line at the terminal area from almost the center of the wing to the tornum. The hindwing ground color is dark brown.

== Etymology ==
The species is named in honor of Helen Miller, an early major donor for Area de Conservación Guanacaste rain forest purchase.
