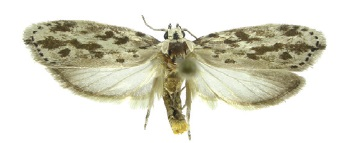

Scientific classification
- Domain: Eukaryota
- Kingdom: Animalia
- Phylum: Arthropoda
- Class: Insecta
- Order: Lepidoptera
- Family: Depressariidae
- Genus: Ethmia
- Species: E. nicholsonorum

Binomial name
- Ethmia nicholsonorum Phillips, 2014

= Ethmia nicholsonorum =

Species of moth

Ethmia nicholsonorum is a moth in the family Depressariidae. It is found in northern Costa Rica.

The length of the forewings is 10.6–10.8 mm (0.42–0.43 in) for males and 10.9–11 mm (0.43–0.43 in) for females. The ground color of the forewings is whitish with blackish markings and two distinct spots at the base, as well as two oblique irregular dark blotches directed to but unattached to an elongated mark line from the middle to the termen. The hindwing ground colour is whitish, but darker at the margins.

The larvae feed on Cordia panamensis.

== Etymology ==
The species is named in honor of Ford and Catherine Nicholson for their support of Area de Conservación Guanacaste rain forest land purchase.
