= Zapote River =

Zapote River may refer to the following:

- Zapote River (Costa Rica)
- Zapote River (Philippines)
