= Tepilia biluna =

Scientific classification
- Kingdom: Animalia
- Phylum: Arthropoda
- Class: Insecta
- Order: Lepidoptera
- Family: Phiditiidae
- Genus: Tepilia
- Species: T. biluna

Binomial name
- Tepilia biluna Walker, 1855

Species of moth

Tepilia biluna is a moth in the family Phiditiidae. It was described by Francis Walker in 1855.
