= Rolepa unimoda =

Scientific classification
- Domain: Eukaryota
- Kingdom: Animalia
- Phylum: Arthropoda
- Class: Insecta
- Order: Lepidoptera
- Family: Phiditiidae
- Genus: Rolepa
- Species: R. unimoda

Binomial name
- Rolepa unimoda (Dognin, 1923)

Species of moth

Rolepa unimoda is a moth in the Phiditiidae family. It was described by Paul Dognin in 1923.
