= Rolepa sicyata =

Scientific classification
- Domain: Eukaryota
- Kingdom: Animalia
- Phylum: Arthropoda
- Class: Insecta
- Order: Lepidoptera
- Family: Phiditiidae
- Genus: Rolepa
- Species: R. sicyata

Binomial name
- Rolepa sicyata (Dognin, 1901)

Species of moth

Rolepa sicyata is a moth in the Phiditiidae family. It was discovered by Paul Dognin in 1901 in Santa-Cruz, Brazil. Dognin describes this moth as having yellow, green, and pale lilac hues.
