= Phiditia cuprea =

Scientific classification
- Domain: Eukaryota
- Kingdom: Animalia
- Phylum: Arthropoda
- Class: Insecta
- Order: Lepidoptera
- Family: Phiditiidae
- Genus: Phiditia
- Species: P. cuprea

Binomial name
- Phiditia cuprea (Kaye, 1901)

Synonyms
- Tarchon cuprea Kaye, 1901; Zolessia cuprea

Species of moth

Phiditia Cuprea is a moth in the family Phiditiidae. It was described by William James Kaye in 1901. It is mostly found in Trinidad and some surrounding countries.

The wingspan is 52–60 mm. The forewings are shining coppery-brown with an elongated cream-coloured mark close to the wing margin.
