= Phiditia maculosa =

Scientific classification
- Domain: Eukaryota
- Kingdom: Animalia
- Phylum: Arthropoda
- Class: Insecta
- Order: Lepidoptera
- Family: Phiditiidae
- Genus: Phiditia
- Species: P. maculosa

Binomial name
- Phiditia maculosa Dognin, 1916

Species of moth

Phiditia maculosa is a moth in the Phiditiidae family. It was described by Paul Dognin in 1916.
