= Tepilia fastidiosa =

Scientific classification
- Domain: Eukaryota
- Kingdom: Animalia
- Phylum: Arthropoda
- Class: Insecta
- Order: Lepidoptera
- Family: Phiditiidae
- Genus: Tepilia
- Species: T. fastidiosa

Binomial name
- Tepilia fastidiosa (Dognin, 1901)

Species of moth

Tepilia fastidiosa is a moth in the Phiditiidae family. It was described by Paul Dognin in 1901.
