= Phiditia scriptigera =

Scientific classification
- Domain: Eukaryota
- Kingdom: Animalia
- Phylum: Arthropoda
- Class: Insecta
- Order: Lepidoptera
- Family: Phiditiidae
- Genus: Phiditia
- Species: P. scriptigera

Binomial name
- Phiditia scriptigera (Dognin, 1916)

Species of moth

Phiditia scriptigera is a moth in the Phiditiidae family. It was described by Paul Dognin in 1916.
