= Phiditia minor =

Scientific classification
- Domain: Eukaryota
- Kingdom: Animalia
- Phylum: Arthropoda
- Class: Insecta
- Order: Lepidoptera
- Family: Phiditiidae
- Genus: Phiditia
- Species: P. minor

Binomial name
- Phiditia minor Schaus, 1924

Species of moth

Phiditia minor is a moth in the Phiditiidae family. It was described by Schaus in 1924.
