= Iguanita Wildlife Refuge =

Wildlife refuge in northwestern Costa Rica

- Location within Costa Rica
- Location: Guanacaste Province, Costa Rica
- Coordinates: 10.63°N 85.63°W
- Area: ~1,100 acres
- Established: 1995
- Governing body: National System of Conservation Areas (SINAC)

Iguanita Wildlife Refuge is a wildlife refuge in the Guanacaste Conservation Area located in the Guanacaste Province of northwestern Costa Rica.

It protects coastal mangroves and areas around the Quebrada Grande.

== Geography ==
Iguanita Wildlife Refuge is a National Refuge of Costa Rica. It is located on the Nacascolo Peninsula of Costa Rica, about 34.2 km from downtown Liberia. The Refuge corresponds to the Área de Conservación Tempisque (ACT), and is administrated by Sistema Nacional de Áreas de Conservación (SINAC).

Before 1993, communities in Liberia, Sardinal, Palmira, Comunidad, Guardia, and other parts of Costa Rica came together to promote the protection of the natural region and the habitats of Playa Iguanita. Iguanita Wildlife Refuge was created to provide protection to the beach, forests, mangroves and fauna as part of these efforts.

== Creation ==
In 1993, a group of leaders from different communities in the area proposed to turn this region into a Refuge Area. They were driven by a desire to maintain, preserve, and develop a natural place like Playa Iguanita. The proposal was approved by Executive Order 23217 from MIRENEM (currently MINAE). ICT (The National Tourism Board). The Refuge was created in 1994 to maintain and develop low-impact tourism.

This refuge was decreed to be for the protection of a great diversity of species, and marine and cultural resources. Additionally, it was also to provide opportunities for low-impact investigation, protection, education, and social tourism. This was a response to the increasing social, regional, and political institutions that seek more protection of terrestrial and marine ecosystems in the area. These institutions are also looking for increased maintenance of the popular Playa Iguanita.

== Climate ==
Iguanita Wildlife Refuge has a warm, dry lowland climate. The area is warmer from October to April, while its rainy season is from May to November. Guanacaste Province, the area where Iguanita Wildlife Refuge is located, has an average annual temperature of 27 °C. However, historical extremes have been as low as 12.8 °C and as high as 40.1 °C.

== Importance ==
Iguanita Wildlife Refuge conserves and protects the local flora and fauna in the area. As much as 84% of the Iguanita Wildlife Refuge is covered with dense mangrove forests, with another 5% covered with less dense mangrove trees. The mangroves provide protection to fish and prawn habitats. Local communities, including people of Guanacaste such as Liberia, Carrillo, Filadelfia, Bagaces, Tilaran, and Upala, value the mangrove forests. The wildlife refuge helps preserve old traditions during the Holy Week, New Year, and Holidays of Costa Rica. The coast of Iguanita Wildlife Refuge is also a tourist destination that is well known as a spot for camping and for bonfires along the beach. Tourism plays a huge factor as an income source for protected areas in Costa Rica, which includes Iguanita Wildlife Refuge.

== Biological resources ==
This area has a tropical climate, with 115 hectares permitting various habitats of flora and fauna with a variety of terrestrial and marine species. There are diversities of natural and cultural resources that include beach, estuary, mangrove swamp, forest, and some archaeological locations.

In the National Refuge are some mangrove species known in the Costa Rican Pacific coast. These include the red (Rhizophora mangle), the black (Avicennia germinans), or the white (Laguncularia racemosa). The vast natural area in the refuge also includes a dry forest, where 118 trees species, 150 mushroom species, 135 birds species, and 10 terrestrial mammal species reside. In the marine area of the Refuge, there are 24 mollusk species, 22 fish species, 13 crustacean species, 5 coral species, and 3 echinoderm species. Additionally, there is registration of marine turtle nesting and births.

== Tourism ==
The importance of the refuge is the protection of a variety of marine species and cultural resources. These give opportunities for research, study, conservation, and attraction of low-impact tourism. The beach has grey sands bathed by the blue waters of Culebra Bay. It is located between dead and active cliffs. It is part of Quebrada Grande, the waters of which flow into an estuary with 24 hectares of mangrove swamp. Additionally, it is a 1.5 km long beach with rocky platforms at the base of the cliffs that are exposed at low tide. This Refuge is located in Bahia Culebra. This is in Golfo de Papagayo, which is near many other beaches and places like El Coco, Hermosa, Panama, Alegro Resort Papagayo, Papagayo Marine, Four Season Resort, and others. However, it is also a new reservation, and, for this reason, has no important infrastructure. for the moment there is only a big house for the forest rangers.

== Controversies ==
The coastal zones in Guanacaste are recently at the highest levels of development and construction in Costa Rica. However, in the same way, they present high levels of improvisation and speculation, generating current and future legal problems in public zones and protection areas. These produce problems of sustainability in the zones, as well as deterioration of natural, patrimonial, and cultural resources.

Examples of these problems are existent in Playa Tamarindo, Papagayo, Las Baulas National Marine Park, and many others in Guanacaste. This is a consequence of ICT that gives concessions to International hotels, regardless of its impact on nature. The communities and nearby families disagree with this action because hotel companies developed parts of the refuge into private areas. This control limits Costa Ricans access to public places like beaches that belong to them by law and right. As a consequence, there are some groups working and fighting to maintain the Iguanita Refuge. In response, they have created and developed Associations like Comunal de Carrillo, Integral de Guardia and San Roque, Candega, Barrio Los Angeles, Las Delicias, La Victoria, and Guadalupe and neighbours of Tilaran. Thanks to these people and the support of deputy Ballesteros Vargas, the Iguanita Wildlife Refuge was created in the file Nº 16.349 and published in La Gaceta Nº 186, September 2006. The objective of the Refuge is to ensure the Costa Ricans and Guanacastecos the enjoyment of the Refuge. This gives equality of opportunities and rights in order to allow all citizens to be able to have access to the enjoyment of the beach.

An investigation done in 2008 also showed that tourists in Iguanita Wildlife Refuge have started fires in the area, resulting from the bonfires lit on the camping grounds.

== See also ==
- Guanacaste Conservation Area
- Area de Conservación Guanacaste World Heritage Site
