= Costa Rica–Taiwan relations =

- Costa Rica: Taiwan

Costa Rica–Taiwan relations are foreign relations between Costa Rica and Taiwan. Costa Rica does not officially recognize Taiwan, instead recognizing the People's Republic of China as the one official government of China. Costa Rica maintained official diplomatic relations with Taiwan from 1941 to 2007 before severing ties. Relations between Costa Rica and China began in 2007. However, Costa Rica still maintains unofficial relations with Taiwan.

== History ==
On 18 August 2000, President Chen Shui-bian visited Costa Rica. Costa Rican President Miguel Ángel Rodríguez accompanied President Chen to take a tour of a Taiwanese export processing zone, an orchid farm run by Taiwan Sugar Corporation and a vocational training school.

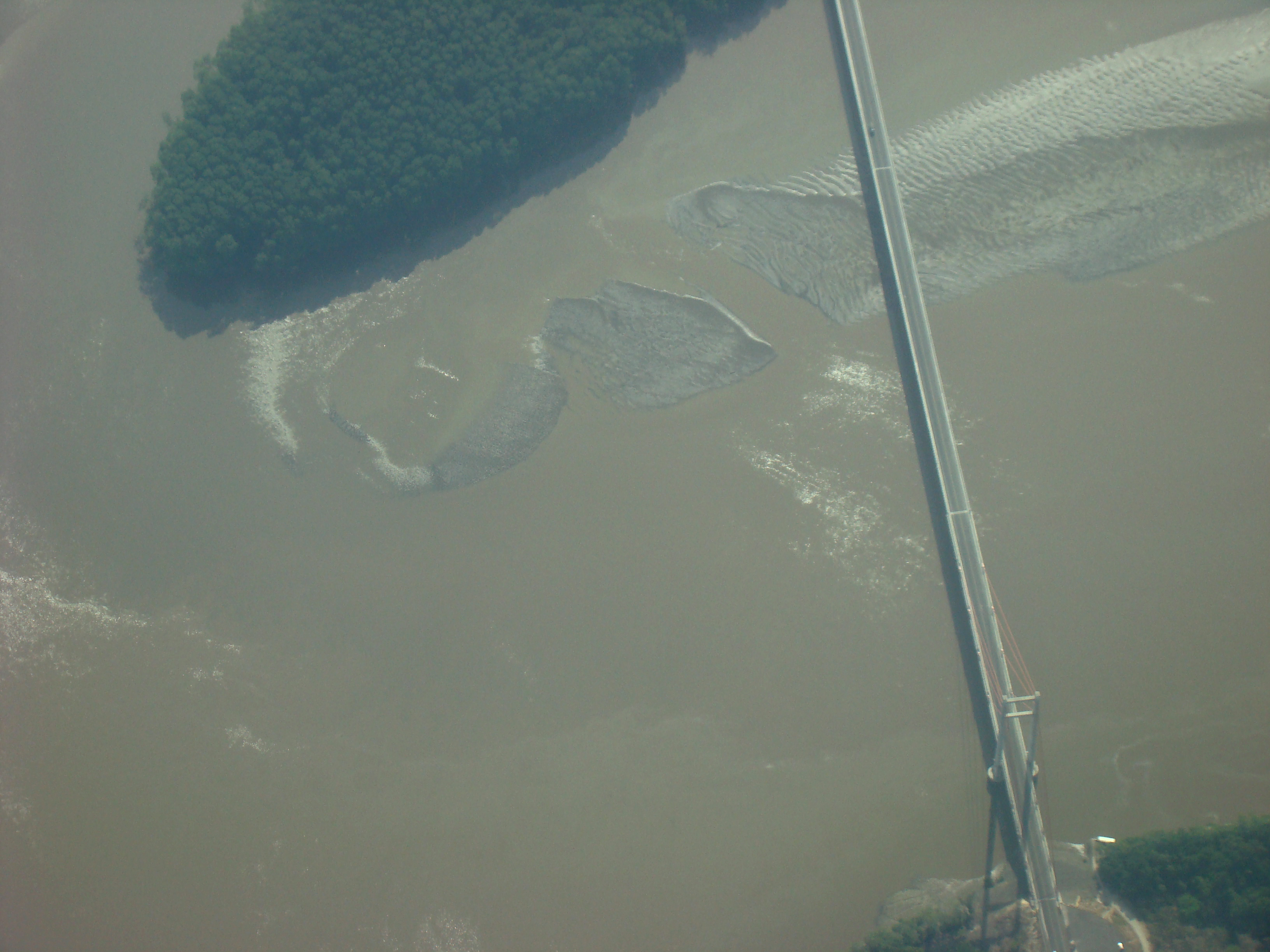
Aerial view of Puente La Amistad de Taiwán

In 2003, the construction of the Puente La Amistad de Taiwán spanning the Tempisque River was completed. The project was financed and designed by Taiwan and built primarily by a Taiwanese company, with participation of Costa Rican engineers and workers. With a total length of 780 meters and an estimated uninflated cost of US$27 million, it is by far the longest and most expensive bridge in Costa Rica.

On 7 June 2007, under President Óscar Arias Sánchez's administration, Costa Rica announced the establishment of official diplomatic relations with China. Subsequently, Taiwan announced the severing of diplomatic relations with Costa Rica. This change over diplomatic recognition marked the end of 66 years of official diplomatic relations between the two countries.

In May 2025, Costa Rica sent five personnel from its intelligence and security agency to Taiwan to undergo more than three weeks of basic intelligence training. China protested against this act.
