= Phiditia lucernaria =

Scientific classification
- Kingdom: Animalia
- Phylum: Arthropoda
- Class: Insecta
- Order: Lepidoptera
- Family: Phiditiidae
- Genus: Phiditia
- Species: P. lucernaria

Binomial name
- Phiditia lucernaria (Walker, 1866)

Synonyms
- Parathyris lucernaria Walker, 1866; Zolessia lucernaria

Species of moth

Phiditia lucernaria is a moth in the family Phiditiidae. It was described by Francis Walker in 1866. It is found in Costa Rica.
