= Phiditia diores =

Scientific classification
- Domain: Eukaryota
- Kingdom: Animalia
- Phylum: Arthropoda
- Class: Insecta
- Order: Lepidoptera
- Family: Phiditiidae
- Genus: Phiditia
- Species: P. diores

Binomial name
- Phiditia diores (Cramer, 1775)

Species of moth

Phiditia diores is a moth in the Phiditiidae family. It was described by Pieter Cramer in 1775.
