= Zapandí Riverine Wetlands =

Nature reserve in Costa Rica

- Location within Costa Rica
- Location: Guanacaste Province, Costa Rica
- Coordinates: 10°09′20″N 85°13′12″W
- Area: 3.6 square kilometres (1.4 sq mi)
- Established: 21 December 1993
- Governing body: National System of Conservation Areas (SINAC)

Zapandí Riverine Wetlands (Spanish: Humedal Riberino Zapandí), is a nature reserve in Guanacaste Province, northwestern Costa Rica, created by decree 22732-MIRENEM in 1993.

The nature reserve is within the Guanacaste Conservation Area, Tempisque Conservation Area and Arenal Tempisque Conservation Area.

== Nature ==
Zapandí Riverine Wetlands protects low wetlands around the Quebrada Grande and the Ahogados River, in the Tempisque River watershed.

== See also ==
- Area de Conservación Guanacaste World Heritage Site
