= Rolepa demerara =

Scientific classification
- Domain: Eukaryota
- Kingdom: Animalia
- Phylum: Arthropoda
- Class: Insecta
- Order: Lepidoptera
- Family: Phiditiidae
- Genus: Rolepa
- Species: R. demerara

Binomial name
- Rolepa demerara Schaus, 1927

Species of moth

Rolepa demerara is a moth in the Phiditiidae family. It was described by Schaus in 1927.
