= Rolepa erica =

Scientific classification
- Domain: Eukaryota
- Kingdom: Animalia
- Phylum: Arthropoda
- Class: Insecta
- Order: Lepidoptera
- Family: Phiditiidae
- Genus: Rolepa
- Species: R. erica

Binomial name
- Rolepa erica Schaus, 1927

Species of moth

Rolepa erica is a species of moth in the family Phiditiidae. It was first described by William Schaus in 1927.
