= Guanacaste National Park (Costa Rica) =

National park in northern Costa Rica

- IUCN category II (national park)
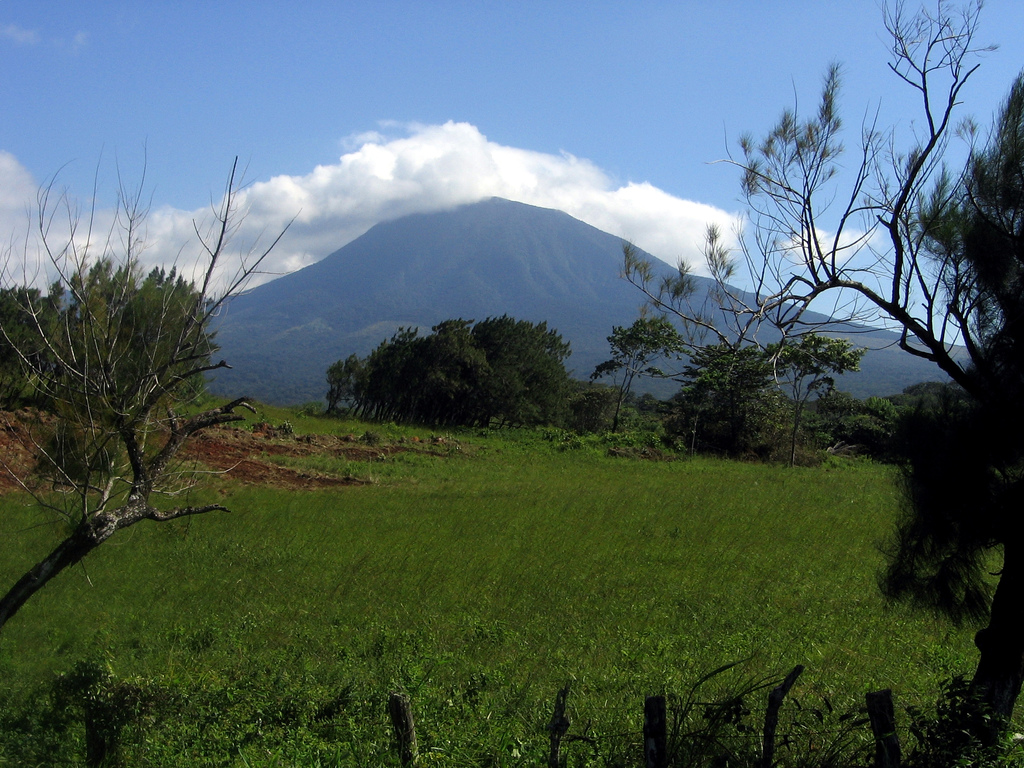
- Rincón de la Vieja Volcano, in the park
- Guanacaste National Park area.
- Location: Costa Rica
- Coordinates: 10.9547°N 85.5162°W
- Area: 340 km^{2} (84,000 acres)
- Established: 9 July 1991
- Governing body: National System of Conservation Areas (SINAC)
- Location in Costa Rica

Guanacaste National Park, in Spanish Parque Nacional Guanacaste is a national park in northern Costa Rica. The park is part of the Area de Conservación Guanacaste World Heritage Site, and stretches from the slopes of the Orosí and Cacao volcanoes west to the Interamerican Highway where it is adjacent to the Santa Rosa National Park. It was created in 1989, partially due to the campaigning and fund-raising of Dr. Daniel Janzen to allow a corridor between the dry forest and rain forest areas which many species migrate between seasonally. The park covers an area of approximately 340 square kilometers, and includes 140 species of mammals, over 300 birds, 100 amphibians and reptiles, and over 10,000 species of insects that have been identified. It was this high density of bio-diversity that encouraged the Costa Rican government to protect this area. The Guanacaste National Park weaves the neighboring Santa Rosa National Park with the high altitude forests of the two volcanoes, Orosi and Cacao, and the rainforest of the Caribbean in the country's north.

The Tempisque River flows through the park's lowland areas. There are dry forests at lower elevations and cloud forests at higher elevations. There are several trails running through the park that offer up good hiking. The trail leading to the Orosi Volcano passes pre-Columbian petroglyphs at El Pedregal, an archaeological site with several hundred rock engravings on the flanks of the volcano dated to between 500 BC and 1500 AD and studied since 2018 by the multinational Proyecto Arqueológico Guanacaste.

The nearest city is La Cruz to the northwest, and the park contains several facilities notably the headquarters of the Guanacaste Conservation Area, as well as stations at Pitilla in the northeastern corner of the park, Cacao on the southwestern slope of the eponymous volcano, and Maritza which is situated near both volcanoes.

== History ==
In 1989 the park was first established by Executive Decree 19124-MIRENEM/89, to become part of Area de Conservación Guanacaste along with the already existing Santa Rosa and Rincón de la Vieja National Parks. As a whole these formally became part of National System of Conservation Units (SINAC) in 1994 and then later in 1999 a World Heritage Site. In 1995 the Junquillal Bay Wildlife Refuge was added to the group of sites.

In 1989, 12,000 tonnes of orange waste was dumped on barren soil in agreement with park authorities. 15 years later, the area had grown into a variety of plants.

== See also ==
- Guanacaste Conservation Area
- Area de Conservación Guanacaste World Heritage Site
