= Rolepa lojana =

Scientific classification
- Kingdom: Animalia
- Phylum: Arthropoda
- Class: Insecta
- Order: Lepidoptera
- Family: Phiditiidae
- Genus: Rolepa
- Species: R. lojana

Binomial name
- Rolepa lojana (Dognin, 1916)

Species of moth

Rolepa lojana is a moth in the Phiditiidae family. It was described by Paul Dognin in 1916.
