= Tepilia dodala =

Scientific classification
- Domain: Eukaryota
- Kingdom: Animalia
- Phylum: Arthropoda
- Class: Insecta
- Order: Lepidoptera
- Family: Phiditiidae
- Genus: Tepilia
- Species: T. dodala

Binomial name
- Tepilia dodala Schaus, 1927

Species of moth

Tepilia dodala is a moth in the Phiditiidae family. It was described by Schaus in 1927.
