= Puente La Amistad de Taiwán =

Bridge in Costa Rica

- Coordinates: 10°14′50″N 85°14′45″W
- Carries: Two lanes of roadway and sidewalks
- Crosses: Tempisque River
- Official name: Puente La Amistad de Taiwán
- Other name: Puente de la Amistad

Characteristics
- Design: Cable-stayed bridge and pillars
- Total length: 780 metres
- Width: 13.3 metres
- Longest span: 170 meters

Location
- Interactive map of Puente La Amistad de Taiwán

Puente La Amistad de Taiwán (English: "Taiwan Friendship Bridge") spans the Tempisque River, on National Route 18, connecting the cantons of Nicoya and Cañas in Guanacaste, northwestern Costa Rica. Although generally known as a cable-stayed bridge, it is really a hybrid bridge composed of a cable-stayed span and a pillar-supported span. The cable-stayed section has two spans of 170 and 90 metres, supported by an 80-metre-high pylon, While the pillar-supported section is supported by 8 pillars. Completed in 2003, with a total length of 780 meters and an estimated uninflated cost of US$27 million, it is by far the longest and most expensive bridge in Costa Rica.

The bridge was financed and designed by Taiwan and built primarily by the Taiwanese company MAA, with participation of Costa Rican engineers and workers. It has a particular importance for the province of Guanacaste for it facilitates transit between the Nicoya Peninsula and the capital city of San José. Prior to the construction of the bridge, this route required the use of ferries to cross the Tempisque River, or long alternative land routes.

The bridge has come to be known colloquially as Puente de la Apuñalada (Backstab Bridge) since former Costa Rican President Óscar Arias cut off relations with Taiwan in favour of China in 2007.

Puente La Amistad de Taiwán was damaged on 5 September 2012 by the 2012 Costa Rica earthquake. Studies conducted by the Costa Rican Ministry of Public Works and Transport, Costa Rican National Council of Viability, The University of Costa Rica's National Laboratory of Materials and Structural Models, and The Federated College of Engineers and Architects of Costa Rica revealed significant structural deterioration caused by unprecedented traffic and lack of maintenance, Prompting an estimated uninflated US$2.6 million maintenance and construction effort by the Costa Rican National Council of Viability in 2024.

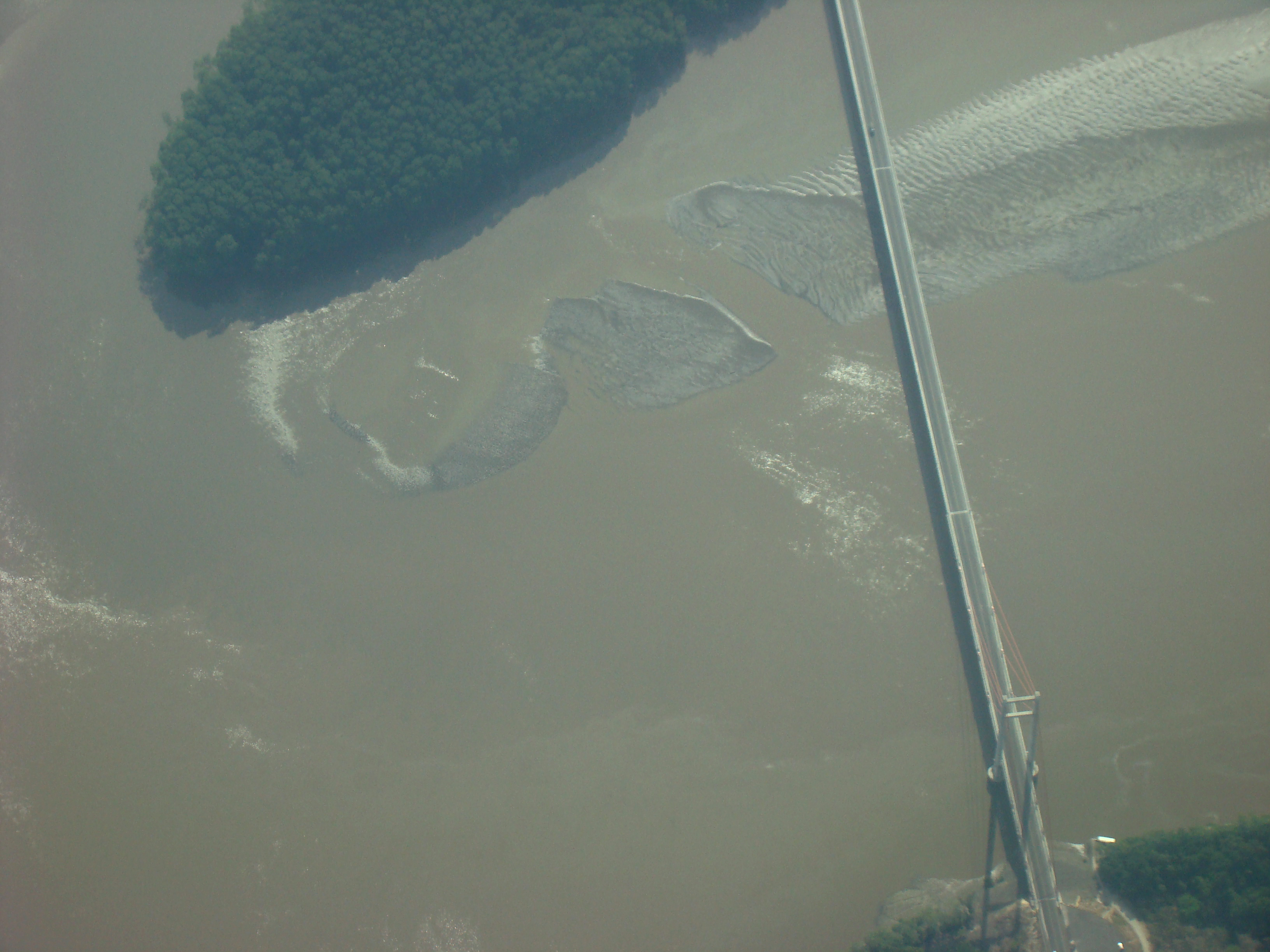
Aerial view of bridge

== See also ==
- Costa Rica–Taiwan relations
