= Rolepa innotabilis =

Scientific classification
- Kingdom: Animalia
- Phylum: Arthropoda
- Class: Insecta
- Order: Lepidoptera
- Family: Phiditiidae
- Genus: Rolepa
- Species: R. innotabilis

Binomial name
- Rolepa innotabilis Walker, 1865

Species of moth

Rolepa innotabilis is a moth in the family Phiditiidae. It was described by Francis Walker in 1865.
