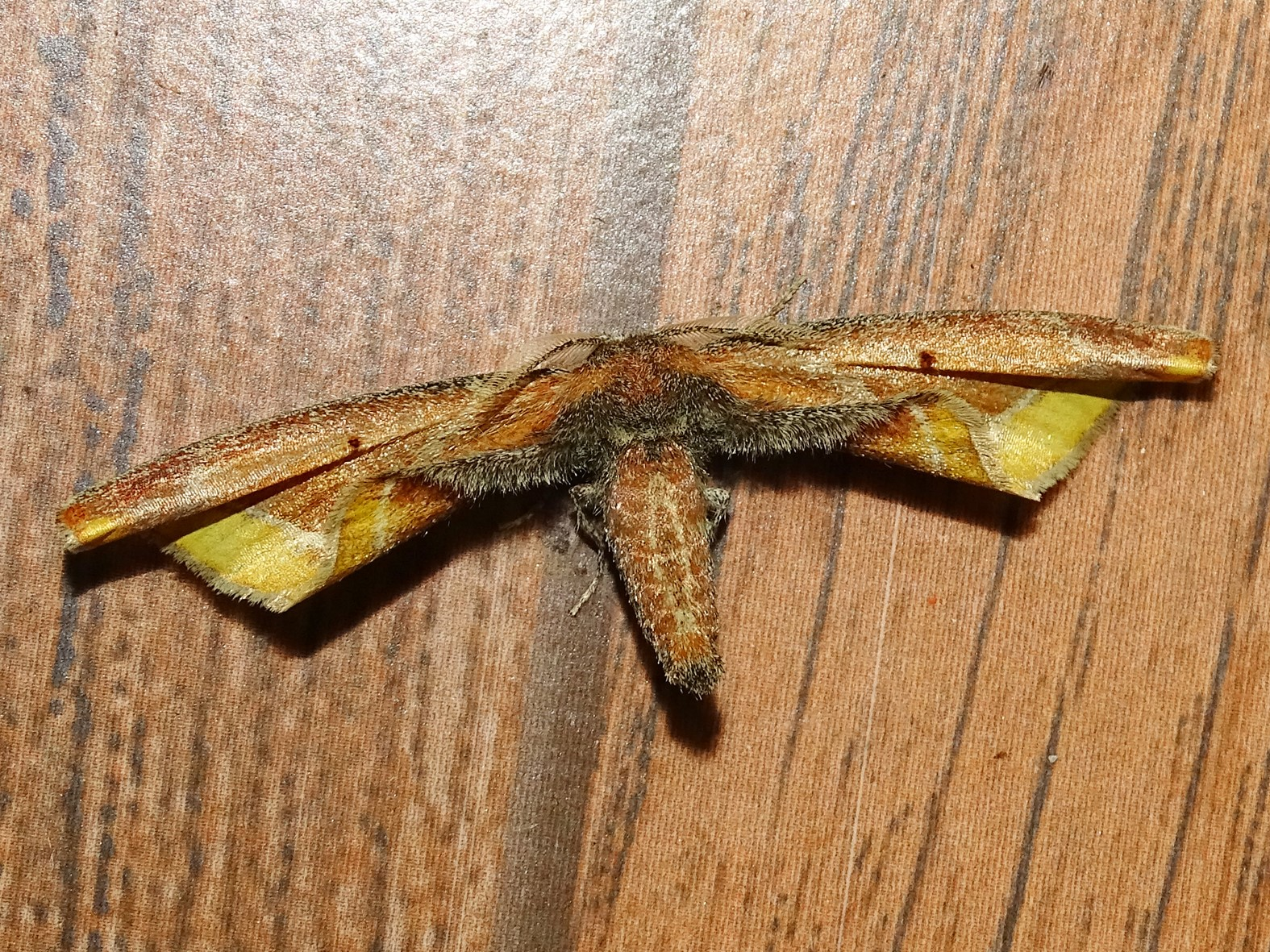

Scientific classification
- Kingdom: Animalia
- Phylum: Arthropoda
- Class: Insecta
- Order: Lepidoptera
- Family: Phiditiidae
- Genus: Rolepa
- Species: R. delineata

Binomial name
- Rolepa delineata Walker, 1855

= Rolepa delineata =

Species of moth

Rolepa delineata is a species of moth in the family Phiditiidae. It was described by Francis Walker in 1855.
