= Tepilia =

Scientific classification
- Domain: Eukaryota
- Kingdom: Animalia
- Phylum: Arthropoda
- Class: Insecta
- Order: Lepidoptera
- Family: Phiditiidae
- Genus: Tepilia; Walker, 1855

Type species
- Tepilia biluna Walker, 1855

Synonyms
- Coryphyala Herrich-Schäffer, 1856; Phecada Walker, 1956

Genus of moths

Tepilia is a genus of moths of the family Phiditiidae first described by Francis Walker in 1855.

== Taxonomy ==
The genus was originally established in Drepanidae, but was later placed in the Lymantriidae by Schaus in 1927 and the Apatelodidae by Minet in 1986. Lemaire and Minet placed it in the subfamily Phiditiinae in 1999. This subfamily was raised to family level in 2011.

== Selected species ==
- Tepilia biluna Walker, 1855
- Tepilia dodala Schaus, 1927
- Tepilia fastidiosa (Dognin, 1901)
