= Rolepa =

Scientific classification
- Kingdom: Animalia
- Phylum: Arthropoda
- Clade: Pancrustacea
- Class: Insecta
- Order: Lepidoptera
- Family: Phiditiidae
- Genus: Rolepa; Walker, 1855

Type species
- Rolepa delineata Walker, 1855

Synonyms
- Olenoptera Herrich-Schäffer, [1856]; Athrula Walker, 1862

Genus of moths

Rolepa is a genus of moths of the family Phiditiidae. The genus was erected by Francis Walker in 1855.

== Taxonomy ==
The genus was established in the Arctiidae and was placed in the Lasiocampidae by Kirby in 1892 and the Lymantriidae by Schaus in 1927. Minet transferred the genus to the Apatelodidae in 1986. In 1999 Lemaire and Minet finally transferred it to its subfamily Phiditiinae, which was raised to the family level in 2011.

== Selected species ==
- Rolepa castrona Schaus, 1920
- Rolepa delineata Walker, 1855
- Rolepa demerara Schaus, 1927
- Rolepa erica Schaus, 1927
- Rolepa fiachna Schaus, 1927
- Rolepa innotabilis Walker, 1865
- Rolepa lojana (Dognin, 1916)
- Rolepa marginepicta Dognin, 1914
- Rolepa medina (Dognin, 1916)
- Rolepa nigrostriga Schaus, 1920
- Rolepa sicyata (Dognin, 1901)
- Rolepa unimoda (Dognin, 1923)
