= Santa Rosa National Park =

National park in Costa Rica

- Parque Nacional Santa Rosa
- IUCN category II (national park)
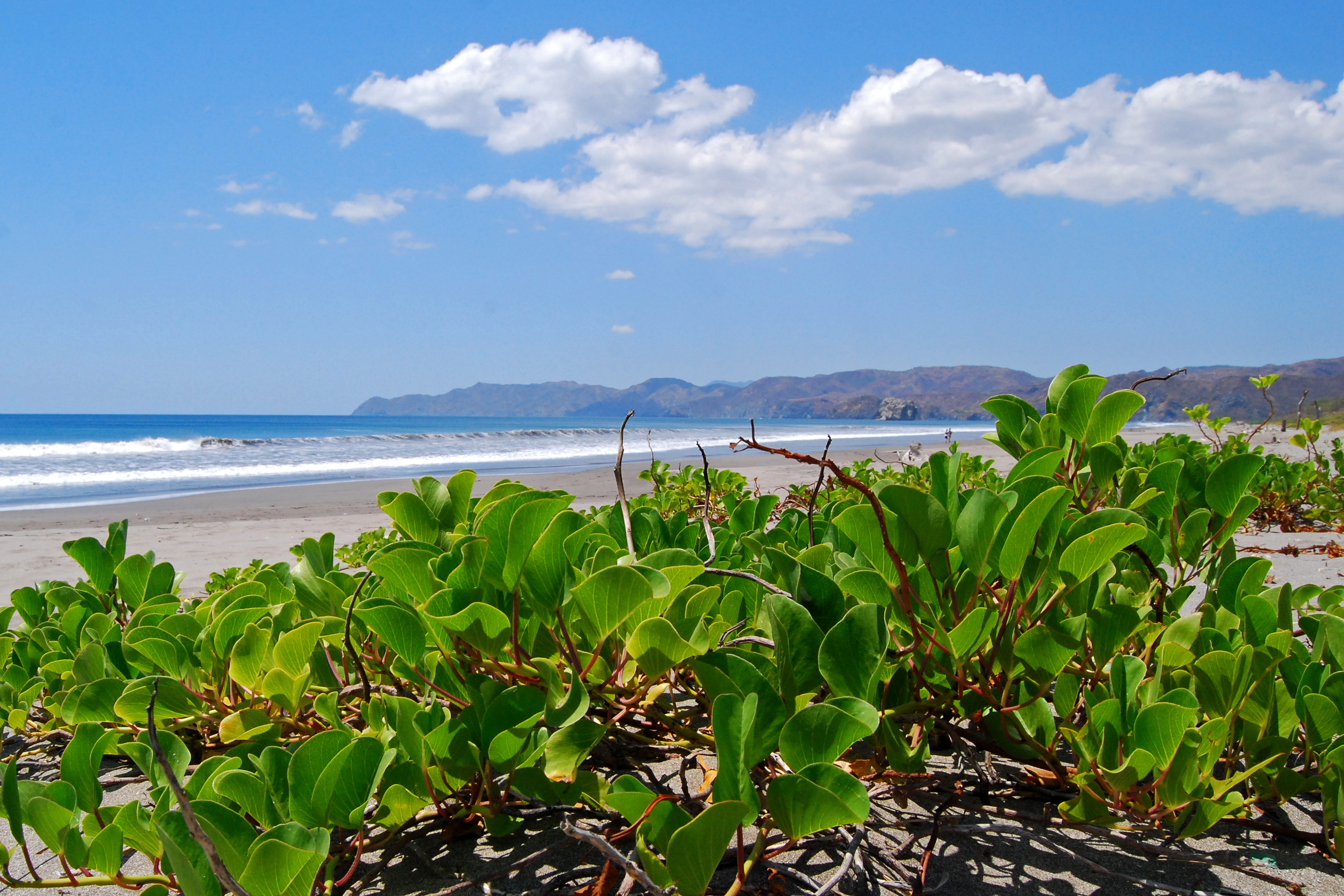
- Interactive map of Santa Rosa National Park
- Location: Guanacaste Province, Costa Rica
- Nearest city: La Cruz
- Coordinates: 10°53′01″N 85°46′30″W
- Area: 389.71 km^{2} (150.47 sq mi) (terrestrial); 425.60 km^{2} (164.33 sq mi) (marine)
- Established: 1 July 1966
- Governing body: National System of Conservation Areas (SINAC)

Ramsar Wetland
- Official name: Laguna Respringue
- Designated: 6 May 1999
- Reference no.: 982

Ramsar Wetland
- Official name: Manglar de Potrero Grande
- Designated: 6 May 1999
- Reference no.: 981

Santa Rosa National Park (Spanish: Parque Nacional Santa Rosa), is a national park, in Guanacaste Province, northwestern Costa Rica, it was created in 1966 by decree 3694.

== Geography ==
The main entrance of Santa Rosa National Park is 36 kilometres (22 mi) north of Liberia on Route 1, in northern Guanacaste Province. The park covers an area of approximately 495 square kilometres (191 sq mi).

It is part of the Area de Conservación Guanacaste World Heritage Site, originally created to protect the scene of the Battle of Santa Rosa. It is also within the larger national Guanacaste Conservation Area.

The Route 1 (North Interamerican Highway segment within Costa Rica of the Pan-American Highway) is along its eastern edge, where the adjacent Guanacaste National Park is located.

Route 913 is completely within the park.

== History ==
Santa Rosa was originally a farm located in the north-western Guanacaste Province, in Costa Rica. Today an old hacienda building, "La Casona", functions as the monument commemorating the fallen heroes of the different battles that took place here.

=== Battle of Santa Rosa ===
Primarily, Costa Rica remembers the Battle of Santa Rosa won by their army over the forces of filibuster William Walker. On March 20, 1856, when the Costa Rican forces reached this point, the filibusters were housed in the main farm building, La Casona. The ensuing battle lasted all of 14 minutes with the national militia victorious in ousting the invaders.

The farm however kept for years its strategic significance. This place was the location of two more battles of Costa Rican forces against invading forces from Nicaragua. In 1919, there was an attempt from the invaders to overthrow the dictatorship of General Federico Tinoco Granados; and in the 1955, Costa Ricans fought intruders supporting a coup attempt against the government of José Figueres.

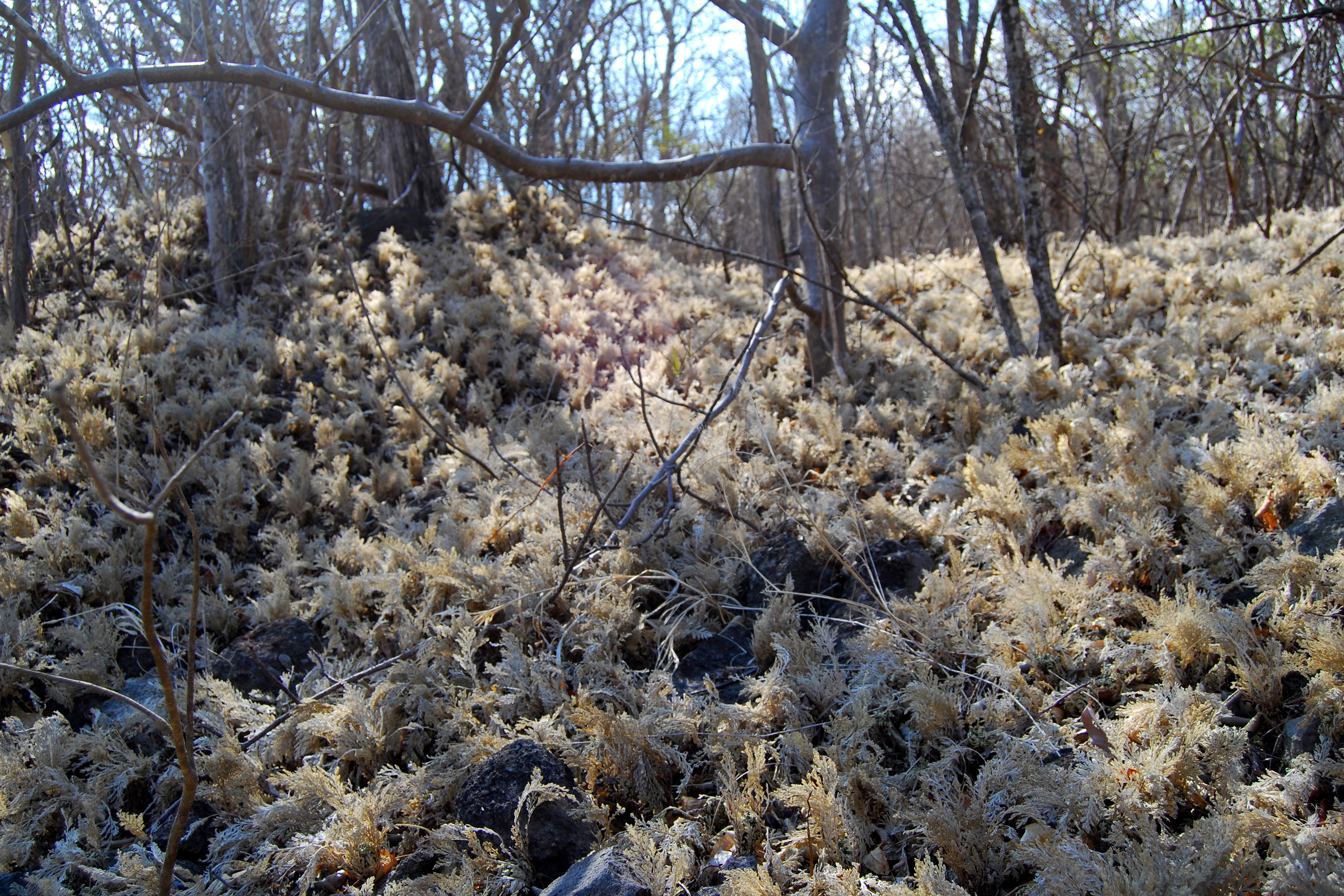
Tropical dry broadleaf forest habitat in the park.

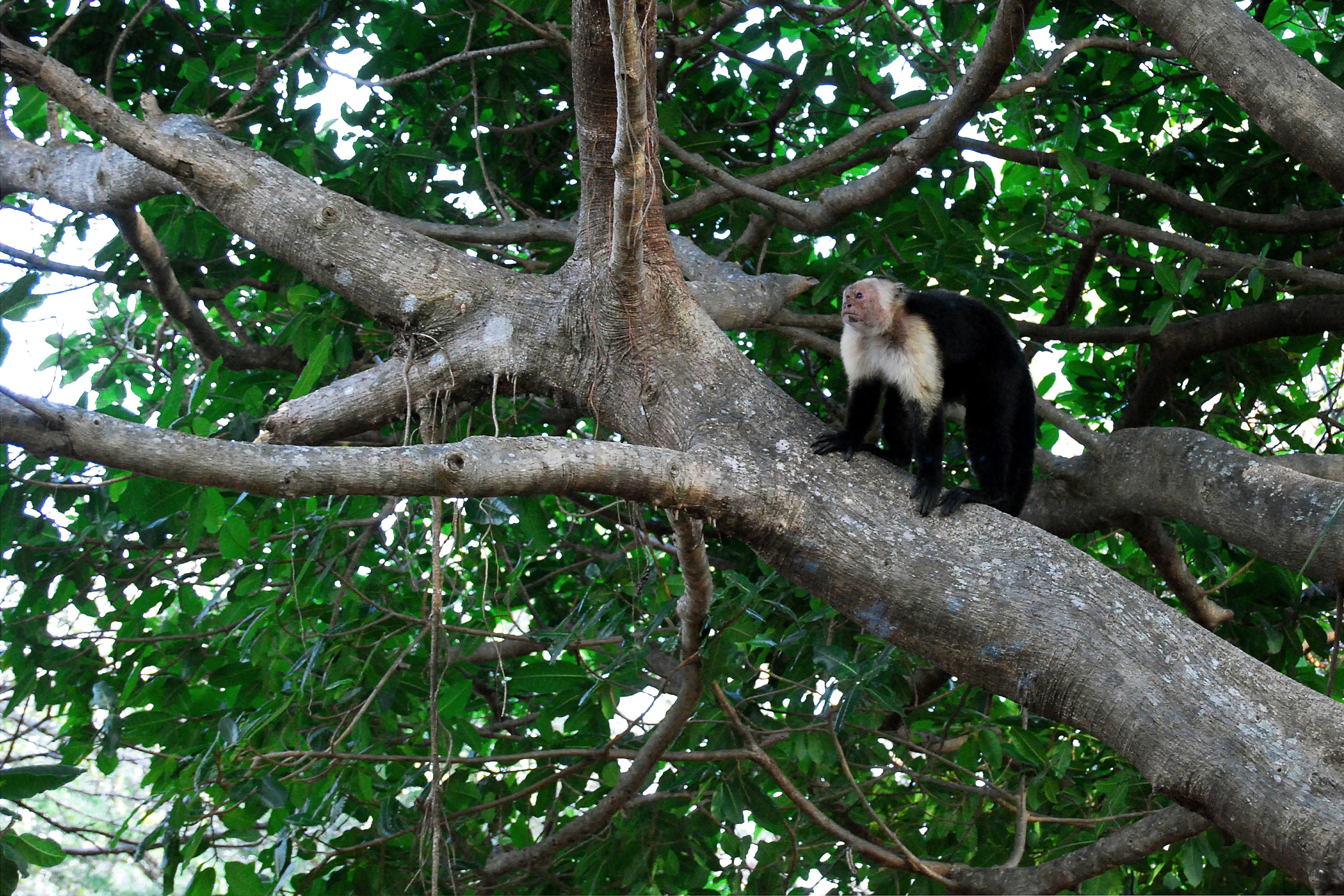
White-faced capuchin monkey in a mangrove.

== Natural history ==
Santa Rosa National Park was also created to protect the natural environment beyond the historical site.

=== Flora ===
There are ten unique natural habitats are within the park. They include savannas, deciduous forest, marshlands, and mangrove woodlands.

Areas of the Isthmian–Pacific moist forests ecoregion, similar to the Isthmian–Atlantic moist forests ecoregion and both of the tropical and subtropical moist broadleaf forests biome; and Moist Pacific Coast mangroves ecoregions similar to the Mosquitia–Nicaraguan Caribbean Coast mangroves ecoregion and both of the mangrove biome; and Central American dry forests biome habitats — are protected here.

=== Fauna ===
Fauna includes coyotes, peccaries, white-nosed coatis, Baird's tapirs, sea turtles, and terrestrial turtles. The three species of monkey are Geoffroy's spider monkey, mantled howler and Panamanian white-faced capuchin.

Several cat species are also present: jaguarundi, ocelot, cougar and jaguar. They are rarely seen.

Around 250 bird species and 115 mammal species are found within the park.

=== Ramsar sites ===
Two Ramsar sites are located within the park, Laguna Respringue and Manglar de Potrero Grande.

== See also ==
- Guanacaste Conservation Area
- Area de Conservación Guanacaste World Heritage Site
