= Phiditia =

Scientific classification
- Domain: Eukaryota
- Kingdom: Animalia
- Phylum: Arthropoda
- Class: Insecta
- Order: Lepidoptera
- Superfamily: Bombycoidea
- Family: Phiditiidae
- Genus: Phiditia; Möschler, 1883

Type species
- Phalaena diores Cramer, 1775

Genus of moths

Phiditia is a genus of moths of the family Phiditiidae erected by Heinrich Benno Möschler in 1883.

== Taxonomy ==
The genus was treated in the Lymantriidae by Allan Watson, David Stephen Fletcher and I. W. B. Nye in 1980. It was later transferred to the Apatelodidae by Joël Minet in 1986. Minet designated it as the type genus for the new subfamily Phiditiinae, which was elevated to family level in 2011.

== Species ==
- Phiditia cuprea (Kaye, 1901)
- Phiditia diores (Cramer, 1775)
- Phiditia lucernaria (Walker, 1866)
- Phiditia maculosa Dognin, 1916
- Phiditia minor Schaus, 1924
- Phiditia scriptigera (Dognin, 1916)
