= Sorocaba (moth) =

Scientific classification
- Kingdom: Animalia
- Phylum: Arthropoda
- Class: Insecta
- Order: Lepidoptera
- Family: Phiditiidae
- Genus: Sorocaba; Moore, 1882
- Species: S. carmelitaria

Binomial name
- Sorocaba carmelitaria (Guenée, 1857)

Synonyms
- Genus; Ceratophora Guenée, 1858 (preocc.); Species; Sorocaba anomala Moore, 1882

Genus of moths

Sorocaba is a monotypic moth genus of the family Phiditiidae. Its only species, Sorocaba carmelitaria, is found in São Paulo, Brazil. The species was described by Guenée in 1857, and the genus by Frederic Moore in 1882.

== Taxonomy ==
The genus was established in the Sphingidae and later placed in the Lymantriidae by Schaus in 1927. It was transferred from to the Apatelodidae by Minet in 1986 and finally to the subfamily Phiditiinae by Lemaire and Minet. The subfamily was raised to family level in 2011.
