= Horizontes Experimental Forest =

- Location within Costa Rica
- Location: Guanacaste Province, Costa Rica
- Coordinates: 10.712033°N 85.550888°W
- Area: 73 square kilometres (18,000 acres)
- Governing body: Guanacaste Conservation Area (ACG) of the National System of Conservation Areas (SINAC)

Horizontes Experimental Forest, a nature reserve in Guanacaste Province, northwestern Costa Rica.

It is part of the national Guanacaste Conservation Area.

It is an experimental forest restoration program seeking to restore land previously converted to agriculture back to Dry tropical forest habitats.

== See also ==
- Tropical and subtropical dry broadleaf forests biome
