= Santa Elena Bay Management Marine Area =

Protected area in Costa Rica

- Área Marina de Manejo Bahía Santa Elena
- Location within Costa Rica
- Location: Costa Rica
- Coordinates: 10.925525°N 85.802750°W
- Area: 7.24 square kilometres (2.80 sq mi) (marine)
- Established: 5 June 2018
- Governing body: National System of Conservation Areas (SINAC)

Santa Elena Bay Management Marine Area (Spanish: Área Marina de Manejo Bahía Santa Elena), is a marine protected area in Costa Rica, managed under the Guanacaste Conservation Area, it was created in 2018 by decree 41171-MINAE.
