= Junquillal Bay Wildlife Refuge =

Wildlife refuge in Guanacaste Province, Costa Rica

- IUCN category IV (habitat/species management area)
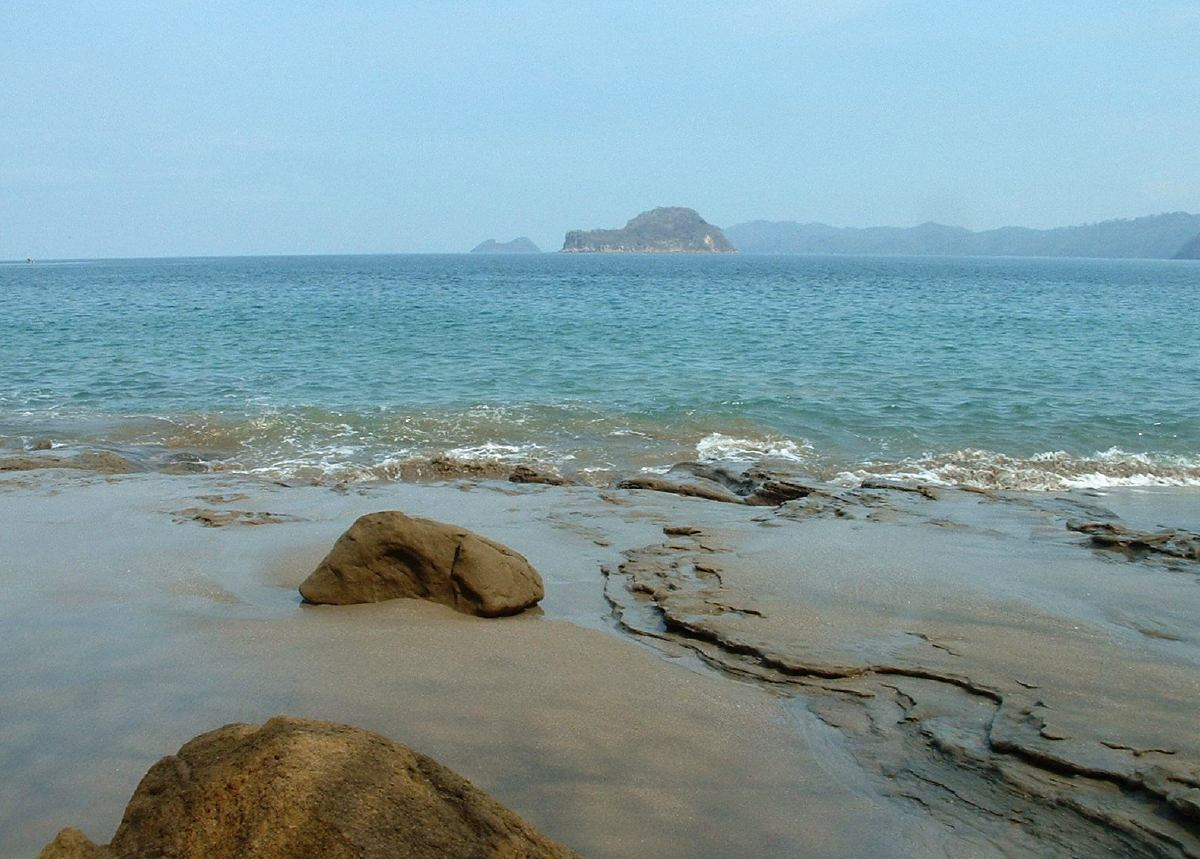
- Junquillal Bay

- Location within Costa Rica
- Location: Guanacaste Province, Costa Rica
- Coordinates: 10.9644°N 85.6814°W
- Area: 4.38 km^{2} (1.69 mi^{2})
- Established: 1995
- Governing body: National System of Conservation Areas (SINAC)

Junquillal Bay Wildlife Refuge, also called the Bahia Junquillal National Wildlife Refuge, is a 4.38 km^{2} (1.69 mi^{2}) wildlife refuge in Guanacaste Province of northwestern Costa Rica.

It is a part of the Guanacaste Conservation Area and the Area de Conservación Guanacaste World Heritage Site.

It protects areas of tropical dry forest and coastal mangroves.

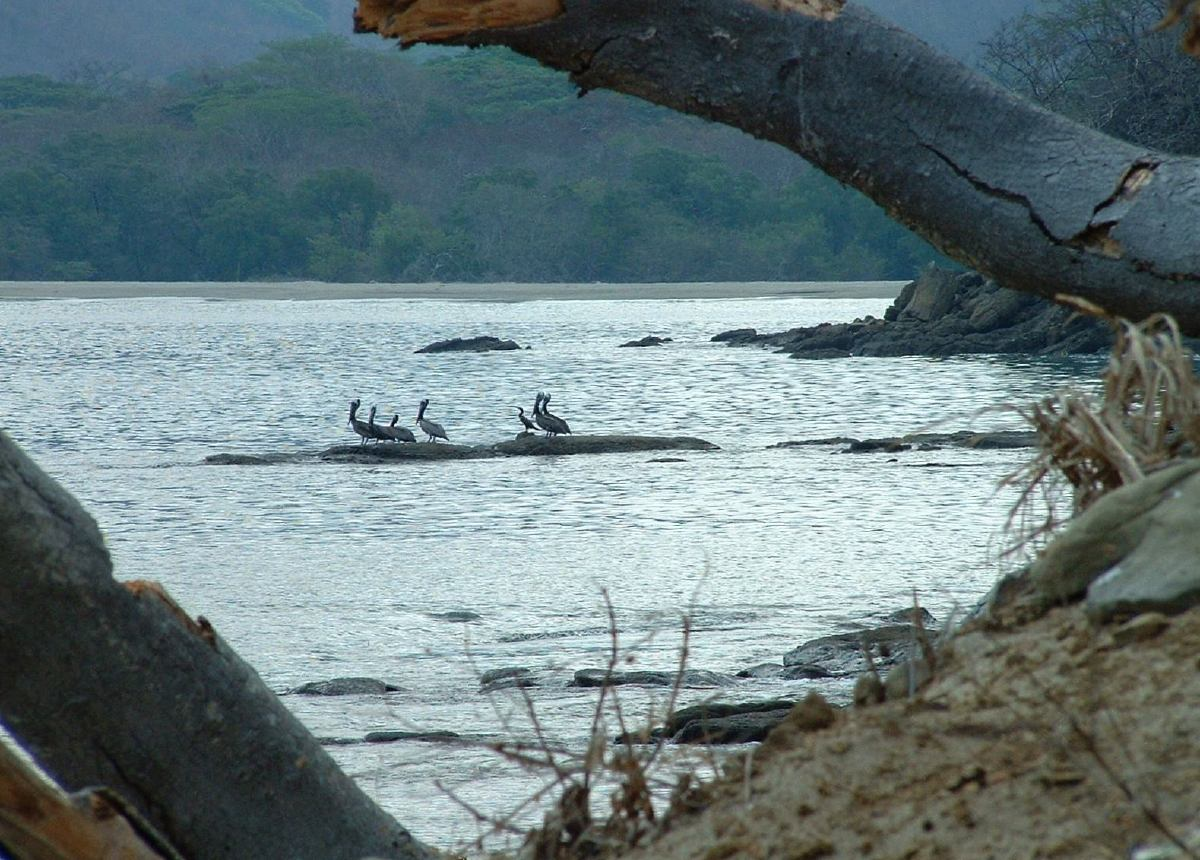
Shoreline along Junquillal Bay.
