= Tempisque River =

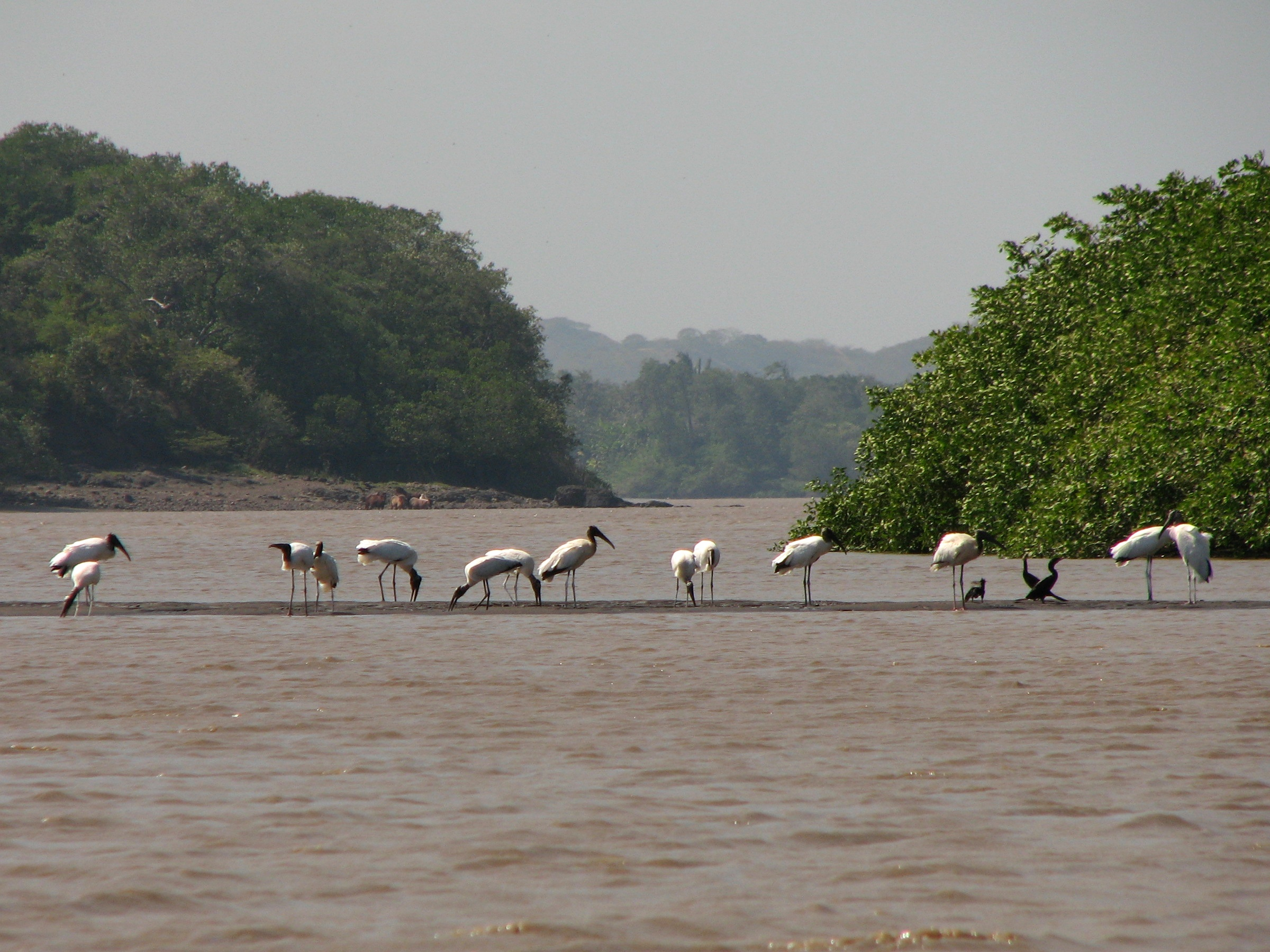
- Tempisque River Bridge

- Location of mouth
- Native name: Río Tempisque (Spanish)

Location
- Country: Costa Rica
- Province: Guanacaste
- City: Palo Verde

Physical characteristics
- Source: Cordillera de Guanacaste
  - location: Guanacaste, Costa Rica
  - coordinates: 10°58′48″N 85°28′24″W
- Mouth: Gulf of Nicoya
  - coordinates: 10°9′20″N 85°13′12″W
- Length: 144 km (89 mi)
- Basin size: 611 km^{2} (236 sq mi)

The Tempisque River, or Río Tempisque, is 144 kilometres (89 mi) long, located entirely in Costa Rica flowing from the Guanacaste Cordillera near the Orosí Volcano and emptying into the Gulf of Nicoya. It passes through the Palo Verde National Park and Zapandí Riverine Wetlands and is an important habitat for various species of crocodiles, monkeys, iguanas and birds. It is named for the Tempisque Tree which is native to the river's watershed.

The river is heavily silted, limiting navigation to shallow crafts that can cross the muddy flats. Tidal conditions dictate the timing to cross the bar at the river mouth.

Historically the Tempisque was used to float logs down to the sea. The logs were gathered at Chira Island to be loaded on ships.

== Puente La Amistad de Taiwán ==
The Puente La Amistad de Taiwán ("Taiwan Friendship Bridge") was built over the Tempisque river's estuary linking the Nicoya Peninsula to southern Guanacaste and hence significantly cut travel time to San José. It was funded by a gift from the Taiwanese government, and opened in November 2003.
