= Colegio Federado de Ingenieros y Arquitectos de Costa Rica =

Engineering and architectural institution in Costa Rica

Colegio Federado de Ingenieros y Arquitectos de Costa Rica a public body that regulates the professional work of the different architecture and engineering professionals (in their different branches) in the Republic of Costa Rica. It was founded in 1903 as the Technical Faculty of the Republic and in 1971 was reformed to its current area of action and name.

The institution ensures compliance with basic standards that regulate the professional activity of its union in the country. To this end, it establishes various regulations and codes, with mandatory legal compliance throughout the country.

== Board of Directors ==
The board is made up of two members from each representing the boards of directors of all the schools associated with the CFIA.

== Services ==
The CFIA provides for its associates benefits such as a health plan and Mutual insurance, job board, online campus and email, and other services.

== Building ==
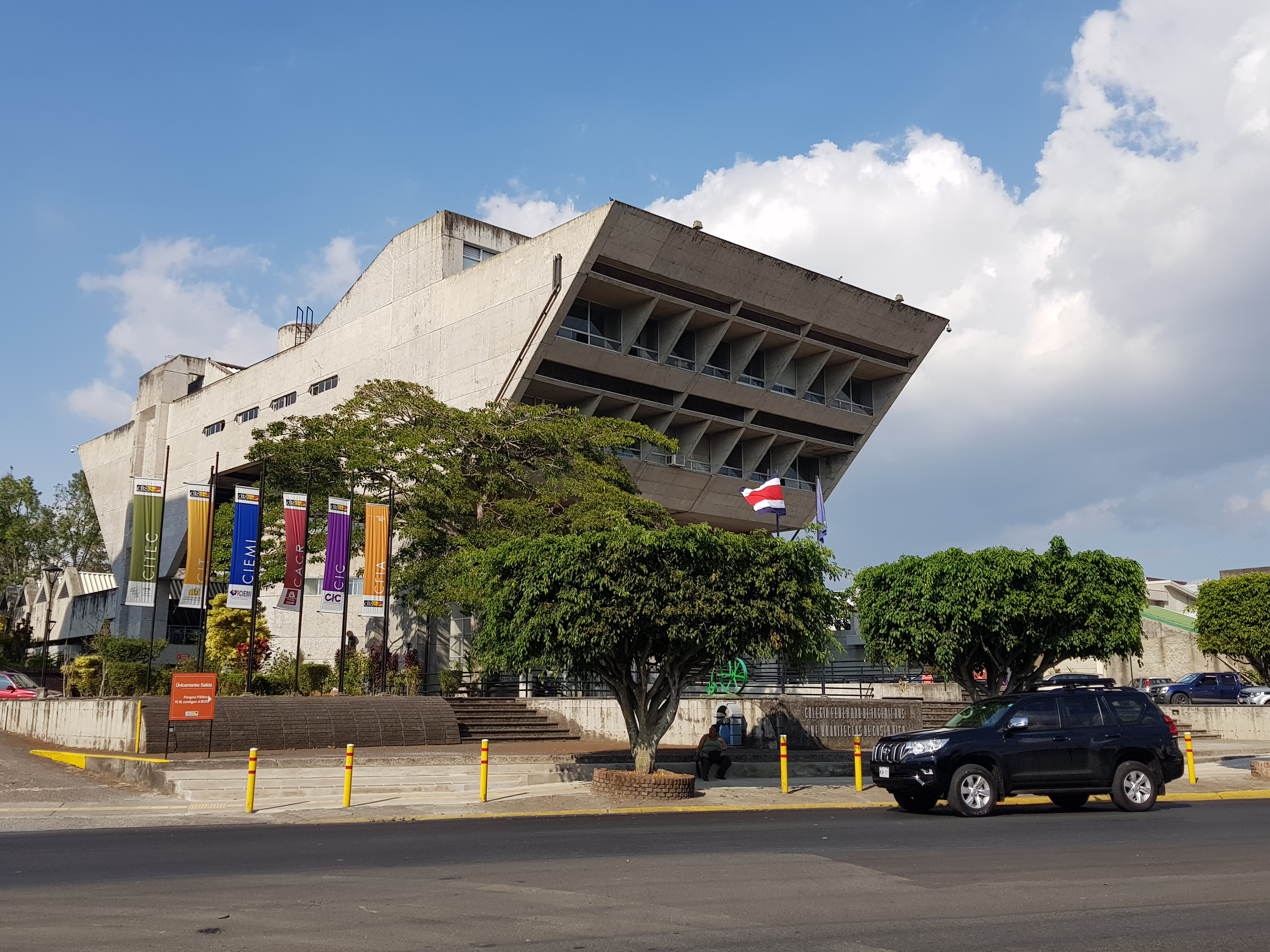

It is the work of Hernán Jiménez, renowned Costa Rican architect . It is located in Granadilla, Curridabat, about 5km from the center of San José, and 50m from the San José Indoor Club.

Its construction took place in the 70s, and the frank use of materials such as exposed concrete, glass, and in interior finishes wood is also used.

The building has an inverse pyramidal configuration that generates a wide cantilever that generates access sheltered from the elements. Internally, it has several floors where the different bodies that make up the school are housed, and it also has a quadruple-height room, where official meals and activities are held.

It also has an auditorium made of brick, concrete and wood, which offers excellent acoustics and is used to carry out talks and training of various kinds.

The building is serviced by CFIA station of the Interurbano commuter train line, located on the back of the building lot.
