= Rincón de la Vieja Volcano =

Volcano in Liberia, Guanacaste, Costa Rica

Rincón de la Vieja
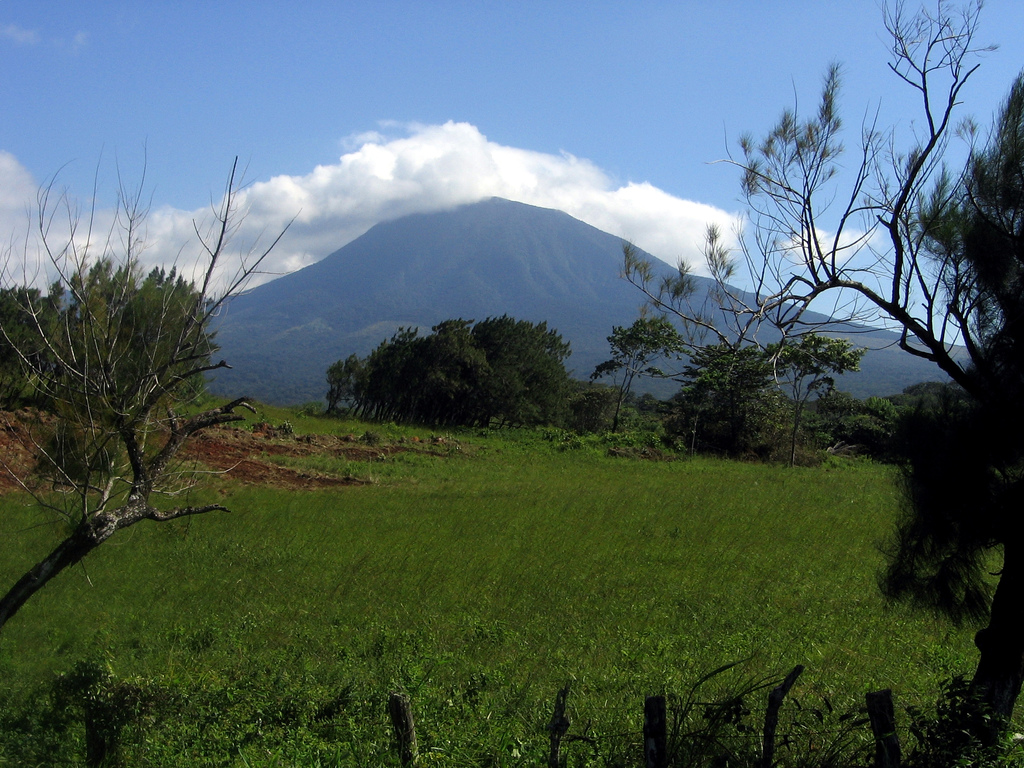
- Rincón de la Vieja volcano

Highest point
- Elevation: 1,916 m (6,286 ft)
- Coordinates: 10°49′48″N 85°19′26″W

Geography
- Location within Costa Rica
- Location: Guanacaste, Costa Rica
- Parent range: Cordillera de Guanacaste

Geology
- Mountain type: Complex volcano
- Volcanic arc: Central America Volcanic Arc
- Last eruption: 2015 to 2023 (ongoing)

Rincón de la Vieja is an active andesitic complex volcano in north-western Costa Rica, about 23 km (14 mi) from Liberia, in the province of Guanacaste.

== Toponymy ==
Its name means "The Old Woman's Corner", or "Old Woman’s Nook" a reference to a local legend about princess Curabanda whose lover Mixcoac, chief of a neighboring enemy tribe, was thrown into the crater by her father Curabande when he learned about their affair. She went on living on the side of the volcano, giving birth to a son. To be with its father, she threw her son into the volcano, too. She continued to live on the volcano and became a recluse living on the mountain, and was credited with powers of healing.

Rincón de la Vieja stands 1,916 metres (6,286 ft) above sea level, and its summit is the highest point in Rincón de la Vieja National Park. It erupted most recently in June 2021. The volcano has many fumaroles and hot springs on its slopes. It is formed by felsic lava.

Rincón de la Vieja is one of six active Costa Rican volcanoes: the others are Poás, Irazú, Miravalles, Arenal, and Turrialba.

As of 2021, only Rincón de la Vieja, Turrialba and Poás are considered active.

Currently, it is a national park where many trails are usually closed due to volcanic activities, and it is normal to hear rumblings from the volcano from time to time, whose sound resembles that of thunder.

== Geothermal energy ==
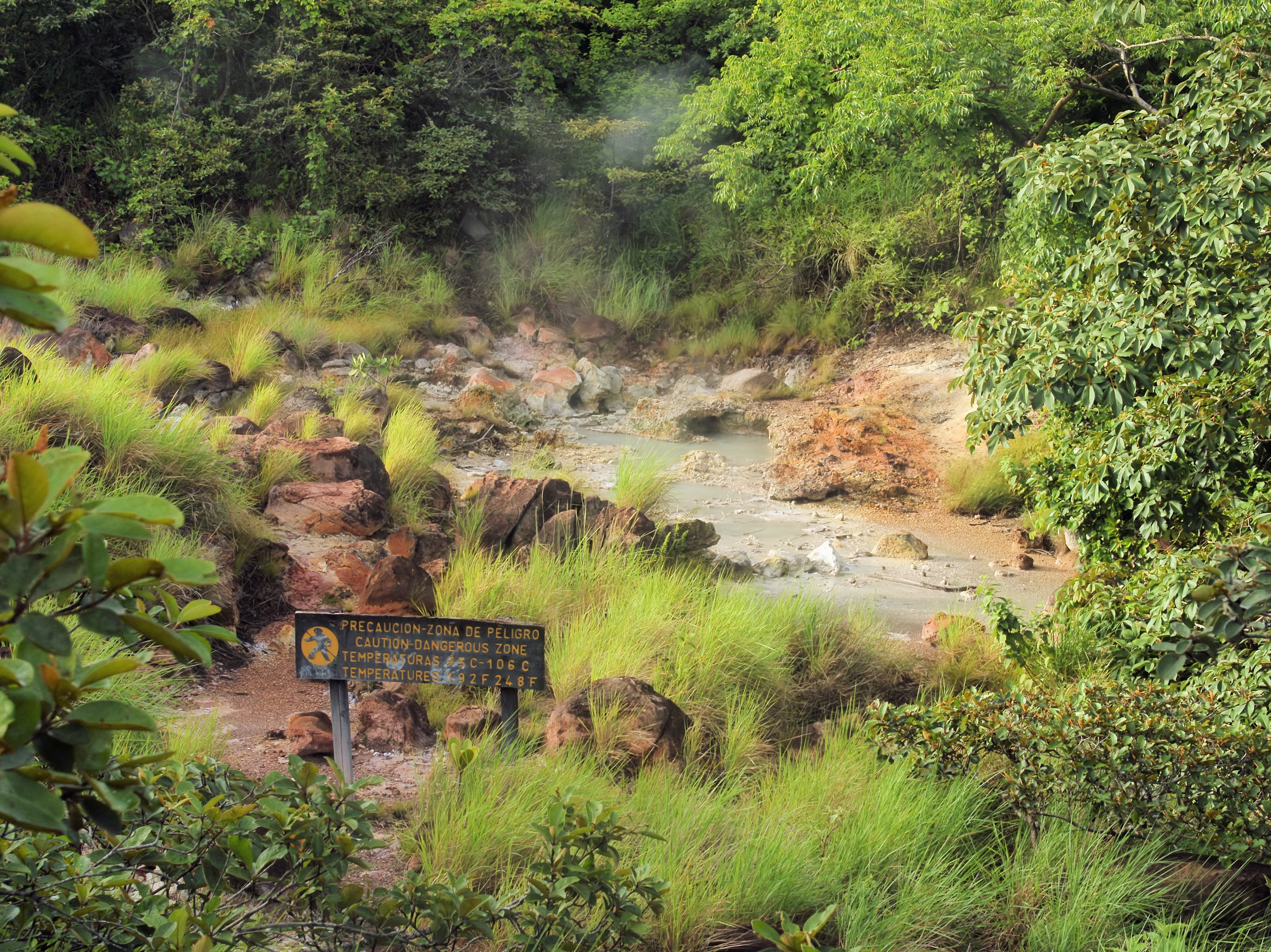
Hot Spring in Rincón de la Vieja National Park, Costa Rica

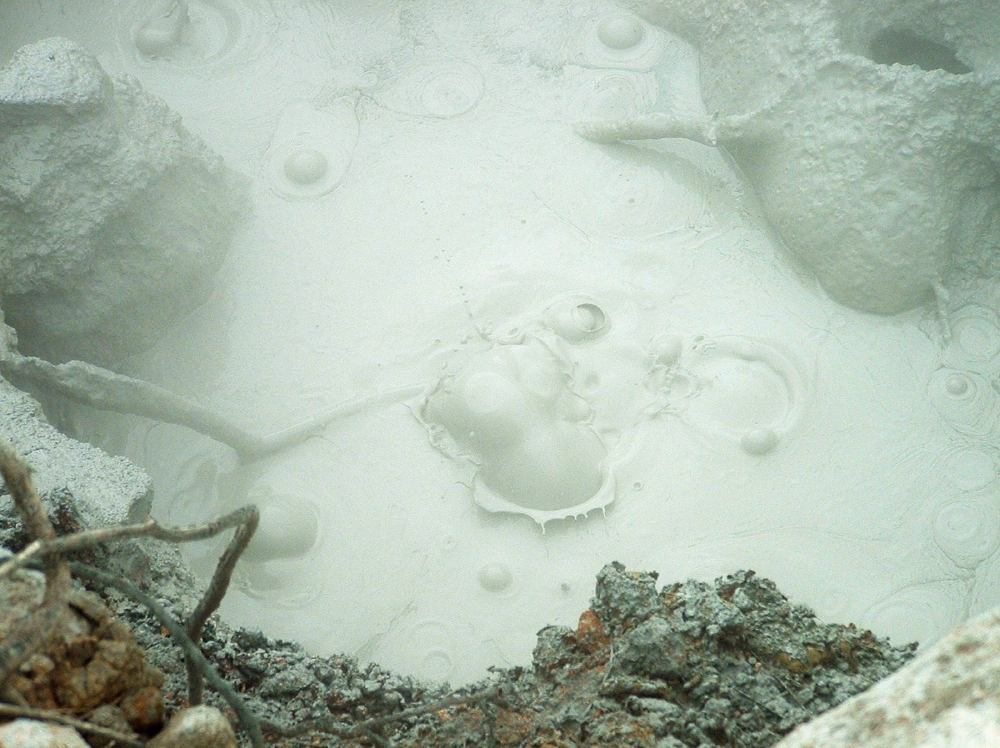
Detail of the volcano

There are many hot pools and areas of bubbling mud in two areas on the slopes of the volcano, indicating substantial reserves of geothermal energy. Investigations have been carried out into the feasibility of tapping these reserves, and the volcano is estimated to have a generating potential of 140 megawatts. However, as the area is protected within a national park, drilling was limited to test wells until 2001.

In 2013, the extension of the Las Pailas Geothermal Power Plant to 55 megawatt, financed in part by a credit from the European Investment Bank, was started.

On the outsides of the national park, a geothermal plant of the ICE is located there, which generates renewable energy from the volcano, being the second in the entire country, the other being from the Miravalles Volcano.

== Tourism ==
The Rincón de la Vieja Volcano is set within the Rincón de la Vieja National Park, which spans over 12,759 ha (31,530 acres) and helps protect both montane forests and dwarf cloud forests. Trails extend from the Santa Maria ranger station and wind through the park, passing hot springs and waterfalls along the way. Mammals within the park include sloths, tapirs, kinkajous, pumas, jaguar, and both howler and spider monkeys.

Previously, hikers could climb to the crater and guides experienced in wildlife, birdwatching, geology, and other interests were available.

As of September 22, 2011, access to the crater is no longer available due to the eruption of September 16 where volcanic ash and mud rose over 36.5 metres (120 ft) from the regular crater lagoon.

Several lodges, resorts and hotels in the area offer hiking, forest canopy tours, horseback riding, river-rafting, all-terrain-vehicle riding, and wall-climbing.

== Activity ==
=== 2010s ===
- 23 May 2017, eruptions occurred and lahars flowed through nearby rivers.
- 11 June 2017, eruptions occurred and lahars flowed through nearby rivers.

=== 2020s ===
- 4–6 April 2020, hydrothermal, gas, and steam eruption.
- 19 April 2020, a 1.5 kilometres (0.93 mi) ash column eruption occurs which prompts the authorities to activate emergency protocols in the surrounding areas.
- 1 June 2020, a 1.5 kilometres (0.93 mi) ash column eruption occurred at 5 pm, activity has been ongoing since April.
- 28 June 2021, a 2 kilometres (1.2 mi) ash column eruption occurred at 5:42 am.
- 21 April 2023, a 7.5 kilometres (4.7 mi) volcanic cloud was released at 3:57 pm. It was also reported that materials from the volcano's lagoon were expelled to the northern side of the cone and had reached several surrounding rivers.

== See also ==
- List of volcanoes in Costa Rica
