= Rincón de la Vieja National Park =

- Parque Nacional Rincón de la Vieja
- IUCN category II (national park)
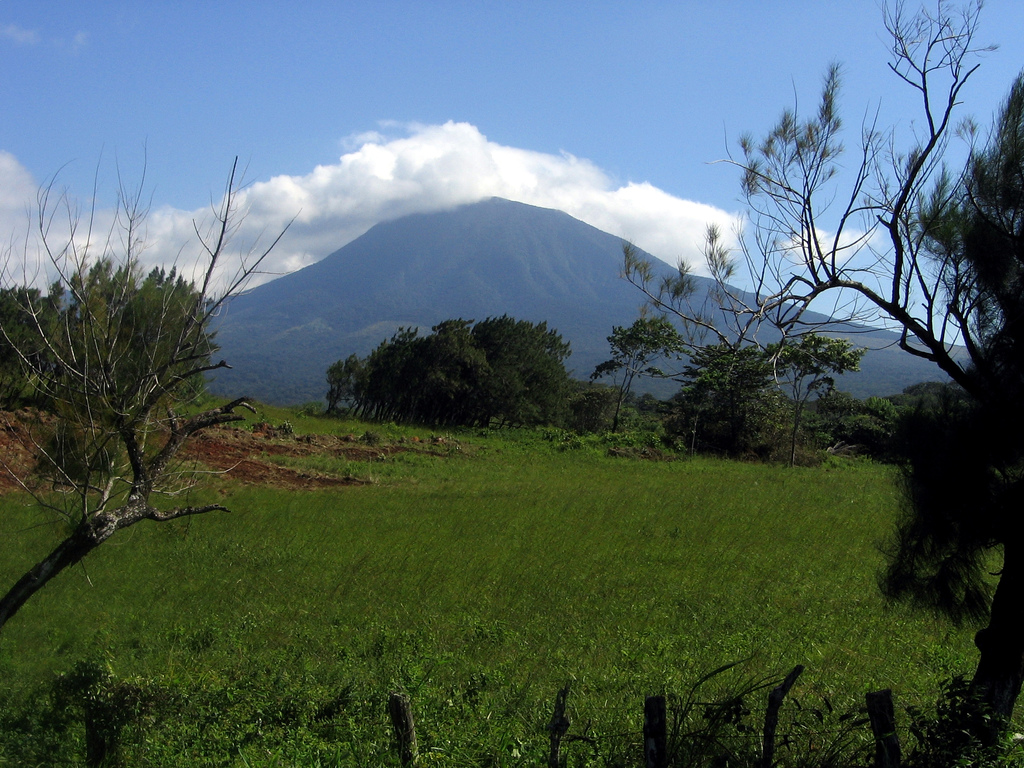
- Rincón de la Vieja National Park area.
- Location: Guanacaste Province, Costa Rica
- Nearest city: Liberia
- Coordinates: 10°49′48″N 85°19′26″W
- Area: 141.27 km^{2} (34,910 acres)
- Established: 23 October 1973
- Governing body: National System of Conservation Areas (SINAC)
- Website: Rincón de la Vieja National Park
- Location in Costa Rica

Rincón de la Vieja National Park (Spanish: Parque Nacional Rincón de la Vieja), is a National Park in Guanacaste Province of the northwestern part of Costa Rica.

It encompasses the Rincón de la Vieja and Santa María volcanoes, as well as the dormant Cerro Von Seebach. The last eruption here was by Rincón de la Vieja in 2017. It is part of the Guanacaste Conservation Area and the Area de Conservación Guanacaste World Heritage Site.

== Geography ==
The nearest city is Liberia to the south of the park, and there are two facilities at the park for visitors information and guides the Santa Maria and Pailas stations which are both on the southern side of the park.

The park has a variety of wildlife, such as over 300 species of birds, such as the three-wattled bellbird (Procnias tricarunculata) and emerald toucanet (Aulacorhynchus prasinus), and also various quetzals, curassows, eagles, etc. Mammals seen in the park include cougars, monkeys, kinkajous, jaguars and many more. The volcanic vents and geysers are habitat for certain extremophile micro-organisms (C.Michael Hogan. 2010).

== Geology ==
The Rincón de la Vieja–Santa María volcanic complex consists of a 20 km-long ridge of 12 craters and pyroclastic cones constructed within the early Pleistocene Guachipelín caldera. The complex contains at least nine major eruptive centers and an estimated volume of 130 km³.

== Gallery ==
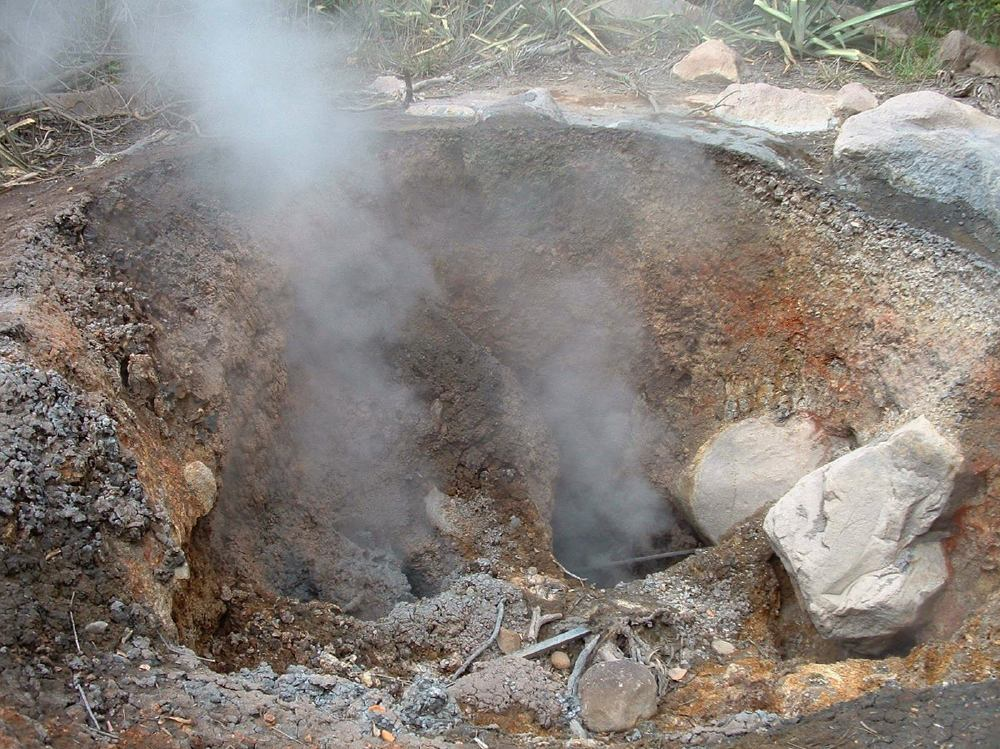
Fumarole at Rincón de la Vieja National Park.

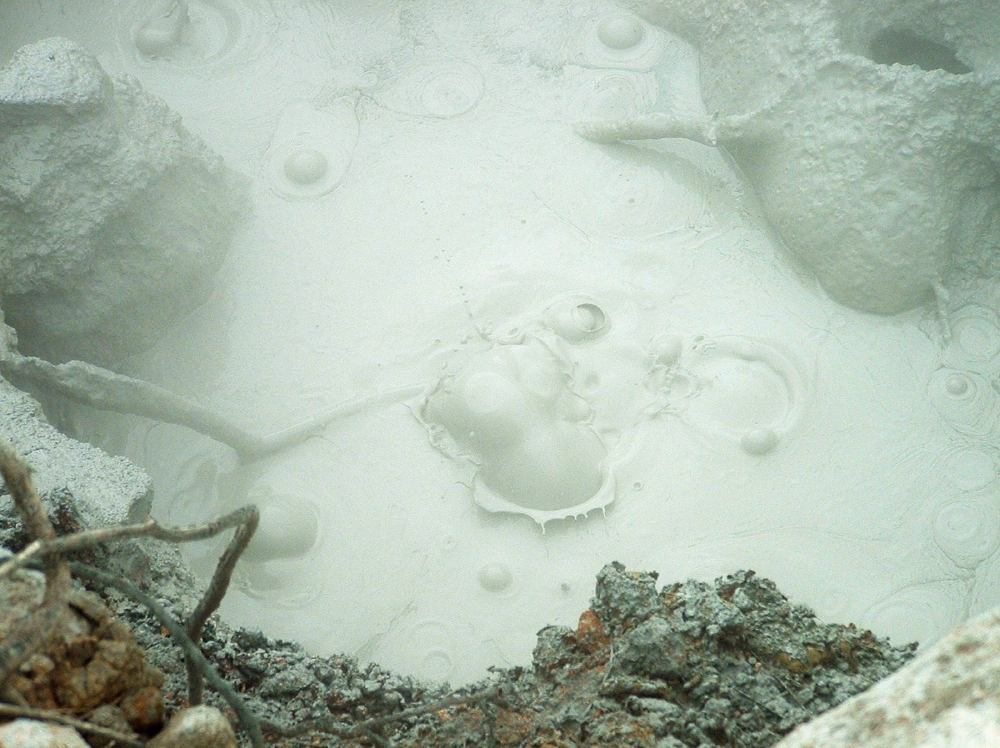
Mudpot at Rincón de la Vieja National Park.

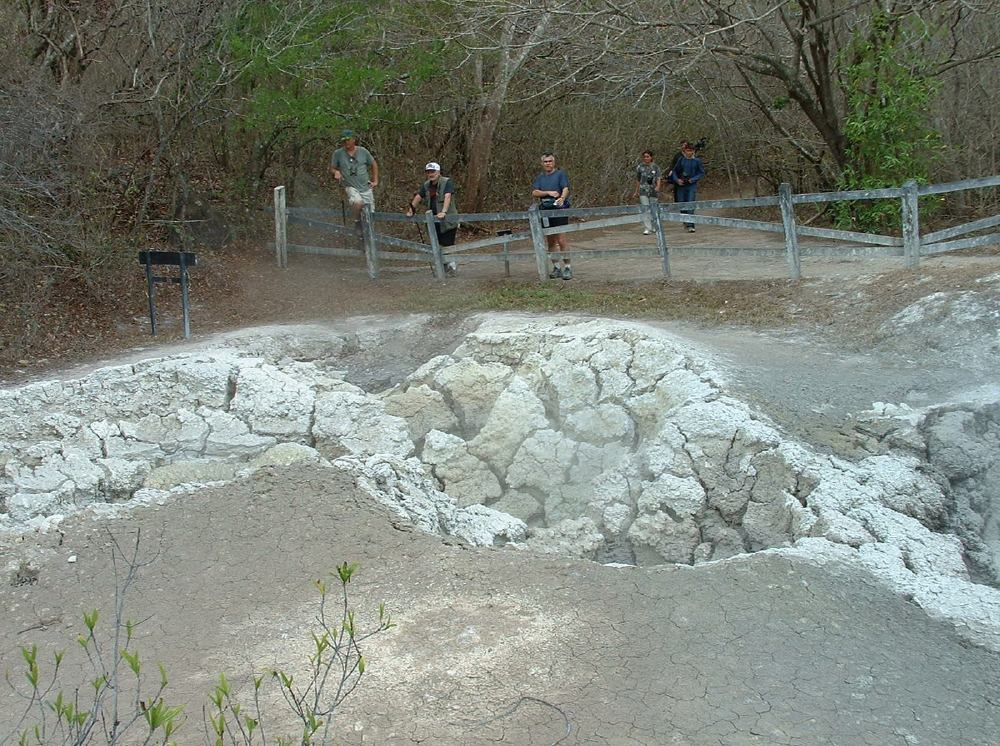
Mudpot field at Rincón de la Vieja National Park.

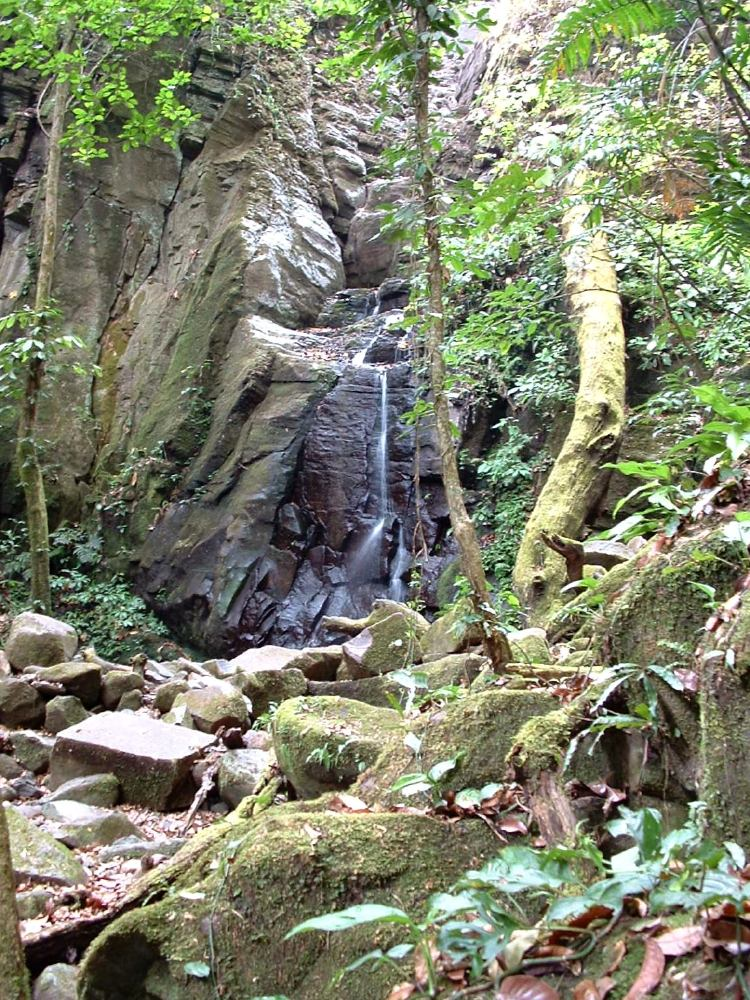
Waterfall at Rincón de la Vieja National Park.

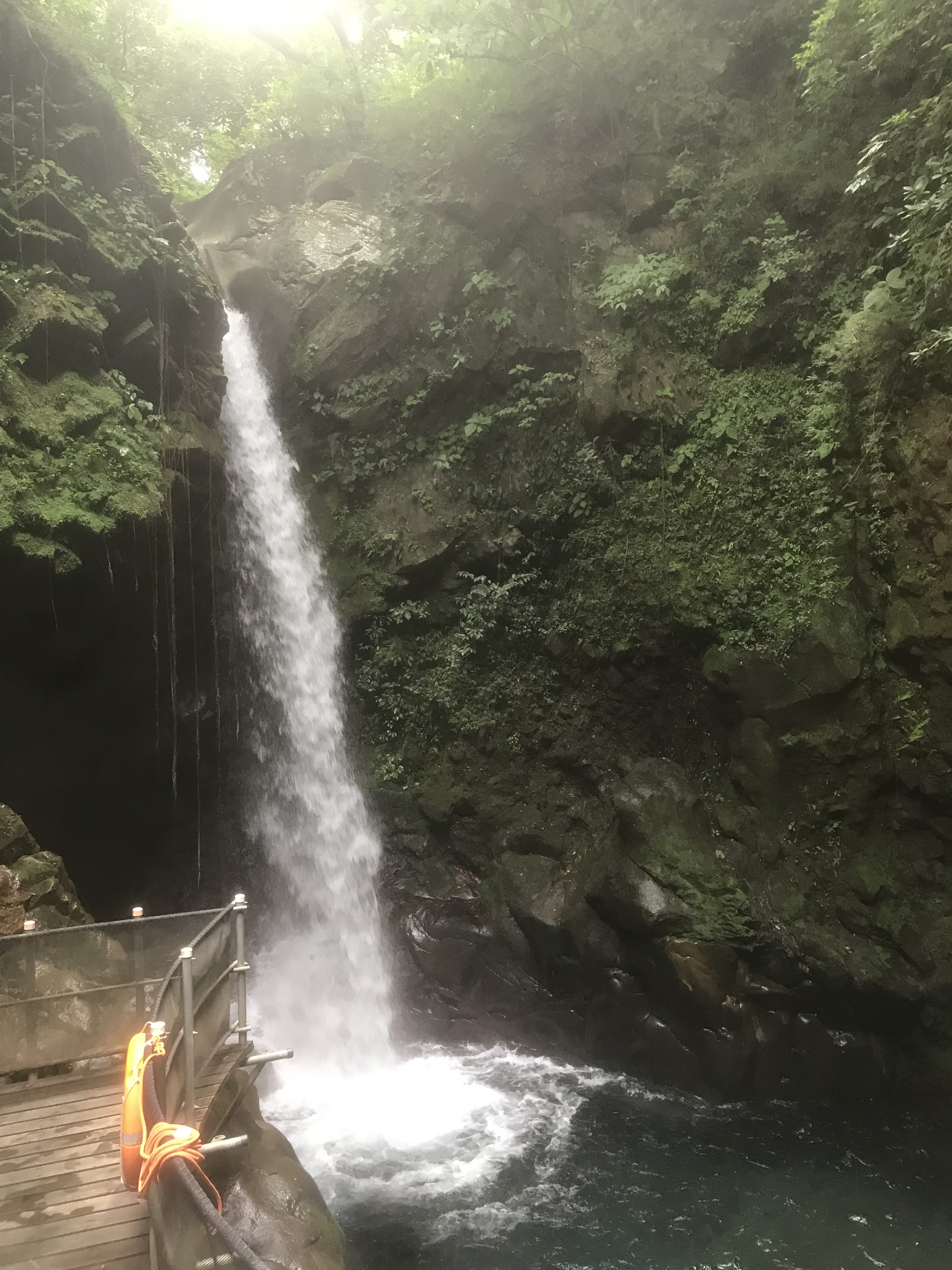
Oropendola Waterfall at Rincón de la Vieja National Park

== See also ==
- Guanacaste Conservation Area
- Area de Conservación Guanacaste World Heritage Site
- Biological reserve
