= Orosí Volcano =

Mountain in Costa Rica

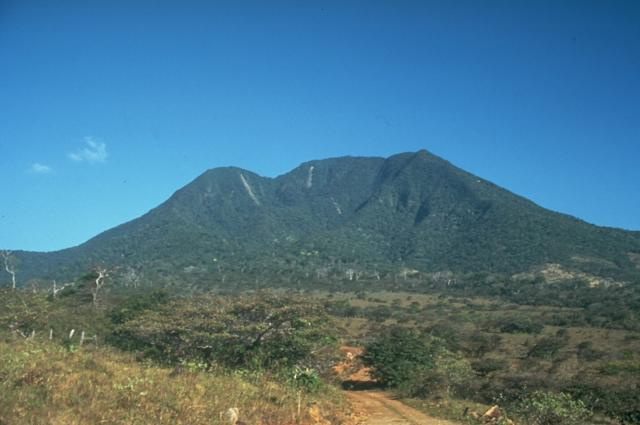
- Southwest view of Orosi, 1989

Highest point
- Elevation: 1,659 m (5,443 ft)
- Listing: List of volcanoes in Costa Rica
- Coordinates: 10°58′48″N 85°28′24″W

Geography
- Location within Costa Rica
- Location: Costa Rica
- Parent range: Cordillera de Guanacaste

Geology
- Mountain type: Stratovolcano
- Volcanic arc: Central America Volcanic Arc
- Last eruption: ~3500 years ago

Orosí Volcano, in Spanish Volcán Orosí, is an inactive volcano in Costa Rica in the Cordillera de Guanacaste near the border with Nicaragua. It is within Guanacaste National Park.

The area around the volcano is a popular tourist destination, especially for more ecologically minded tourists due to its biodiversity. At the base of the volcano is the Maritza Biological Station, which researches aquatic biology, founded in conjunction with the Stroud Water Research Center.

Petroglyphs have been found on at least 465 boulders at a site at an altitude of 500 metres (1,600 ft) on the western slope of the volcano.
