= Zapote River (Costa Rica) =

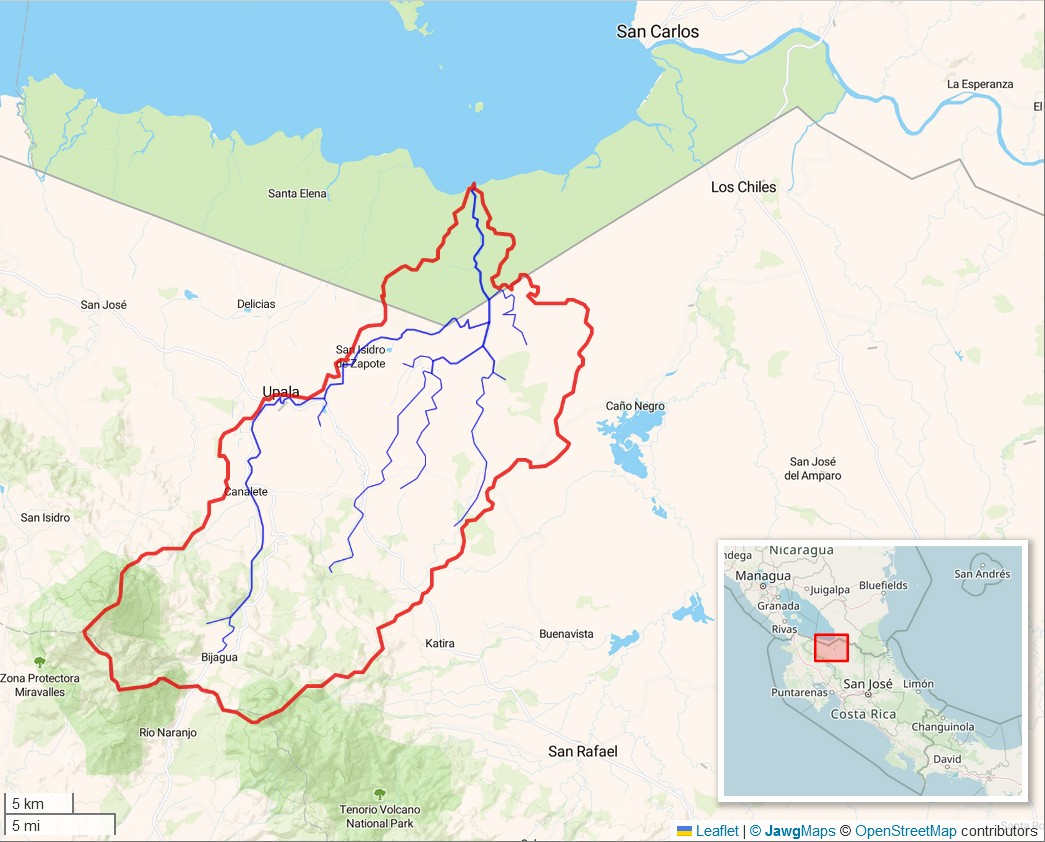
- Rio Zapote watershed (Interactive map)

Location
- Country: Costa Rica

Physical characteristics
- Source: Quebrada Zapotillo, south of Zapote, Costa Rica
  - coordinates: 10.75°N 85.08°W
- Mouth
  - location: Lake Nicaragua near Punta El Diablo
  - coordinates: 11.036°N 84.891°W
- Basin size: 590 km²

Zapote River (Spanish pronunciation: [saˈpote]) is a river of Costa Rica.
