= Cordillera de Guanacaste =

Mountains in Costa Rica

- Guanacaste Range
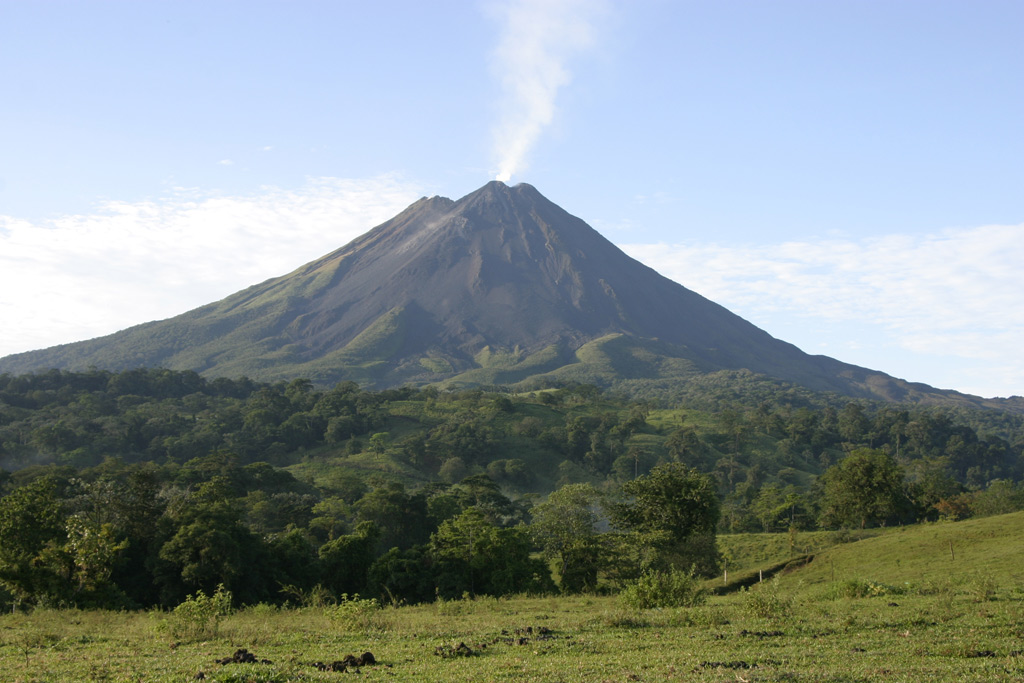
- Arenal volcano

Highest point
- Peak: Miravalles Volcano
- Elevation: 2,028 m (6,654 ft)
- Coordinates: 10°44′54″N 85°9′10″W

Geography
- Country: Costa Rica
- Parent range: Central America Volcanic Arc
- Biome: Atlantic rainforest, lowlands

Geology
- Rock age: Quaternary

The Cordillera de Guanacaste, also called Guanacaste Cordillera, are a volcanic mountain range in northern Costa Rica near the border with Nicaragua. The mountain range stretches 110 km from northwest to the southeast and contains mostly complex stratovolcanoes. The range forms part of the southern region of the Continental Divide, with the highest peak is the stratovolcano Miravalles at 2,028 m.

Rivers flowing from the range drain into the Caribbean Sea (Guacalito, Zapote) and the Pacific Ocean (Blanco, Tenorio, Martirio, Corobiá, and San Lorenzo).

Protected areas located in the mountain range include Guanacaste National Park established in July 1991 and Area de Conservación Guanacaste World Heritage Site inscribed by UNESCO as a World Heritage Site in December 1999.

The range contains areas of ecological significance, as the Miravalles Forest Reserve, hills, and canyons that can be seen from the lowlands of Guanacaste, areas rich with epiphytes, ferns and palms; and areas of geothermal activity, exploited for energy use. Geothermal energy exploited in Guanacaste account to 18% of Costa Rica's electricity and is also exported to Nicaragua and Panama.

Cordillera de Guanacaste is divided into two sections:

- La Cordillera Volcánica - formed by a series of volcanic edifices that begin with the Orosi Volcano and ends with the Arenal Volcano.
- La Sierra Minera - depressions located between Arenal and Tapezco.

== Notable peaks ==
- Miravalles Volcano - 2,028 metres (6,654 ft)
- Rincón de la Vieja Volcano - 1,916 metres (6,286 ft)
- Tenorio Volcano - 1,916 metres (6,286 ft)
- Orosí Volcano - 1,659 metres (5,443 ft)
- Arenal Volcano - 1,670 metres (5,480 ft)
