= Area de Conservación Guanacaste World Heritage Site =

Protected area and World Heritage Site in Costa Rica

Area de Conservación Guanacaste
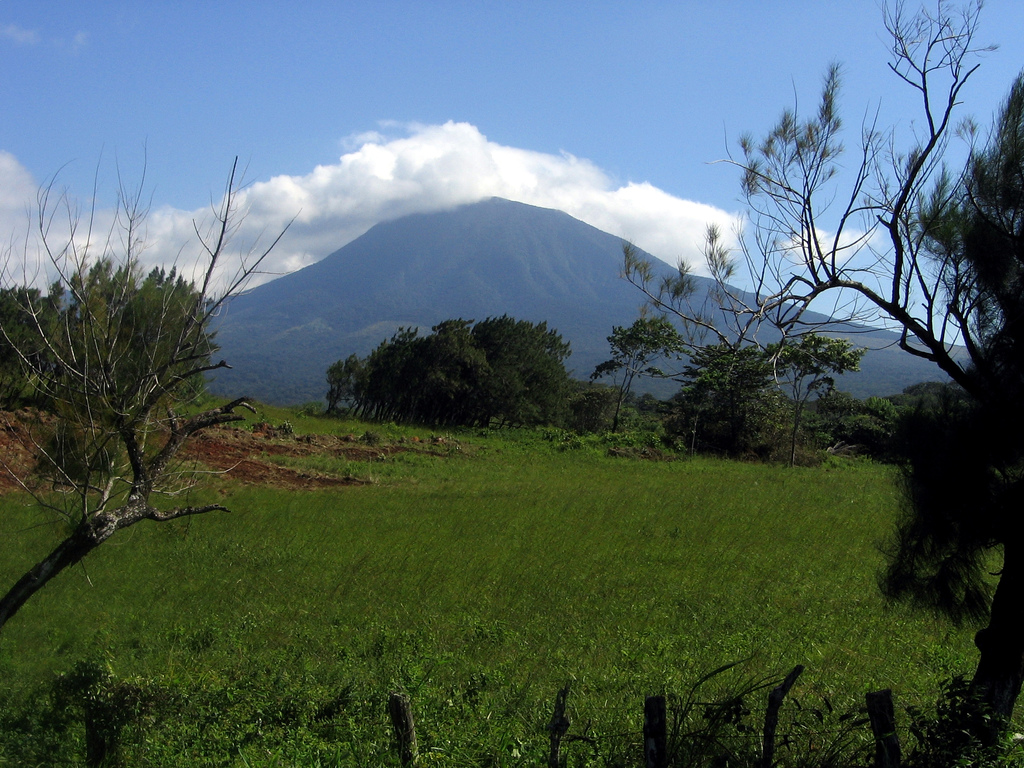
- Rincón de la Vieja Volcano
- Interactive map of Area de Conservación Guanacaste
- Location: Guanacaste Province, Costa Rica
- Coordinates: 10°51′00″N 85°37′00″W
- Area: 1,470 km^{2} (570 sq mi)
- Established: 1989
- Governing body: National System of Conservation Areas (SINAC)

UNESCO World Heritage Site
- Type: Natural
- Criteria: ix, x
- Designated: 1999 (23rd session)
- Reference no.: 928bis
- Region: Latin America and the Caribbean
- Extensions: 2004

The Area de Conservación Guanacaste is a network of protected areas and a World Heritage Site in Guanacaste Province, in northwestern Costa Rica. The World Heritage Site contains an unbroken tract of tropical dry forest and important habitat for several vulnerable species, including the Central American tapir, mangrove hummingbird, and the great green macaw. Over 7,000 plant species and 900 vertebrate species have been located in the park.

== Geography ==
The area of the national parks combined totals 1,470 square kilometers (570 sq mi) as of 2004. This reflects a long-term process of growth, which started with the establishment of Santa Rosa National Park in 1971. Over several decades, surrounding lands were purchased and nearby national parks connected to the growing protected area, so that the Guanacaste Conservation Area came to encompass a high diversity of tropical dry forest, rainforest, cloud forest, and marine habitats. The park contains about two-thirds of the endangered animals of Costa Rica.

It formally became part of National System of Conservation Areas—SINAC in 1994, and a World Heritage Site in 1999. In 2004, the World Heritage Site was extended with a private property measuring 15,000 ha in the Santa Elena rain forest.

=== Elements ===
The World Heritage Site includes:

- Santa Rosa National Park
- Guanacaste National Park
- Rincón de la Vieja Volcano National Park
- Junquillal Bay Wildlife Refuge

== See also ==
- Guanacaste Conservation Area
- World Heritage Sites in Costa Rica
