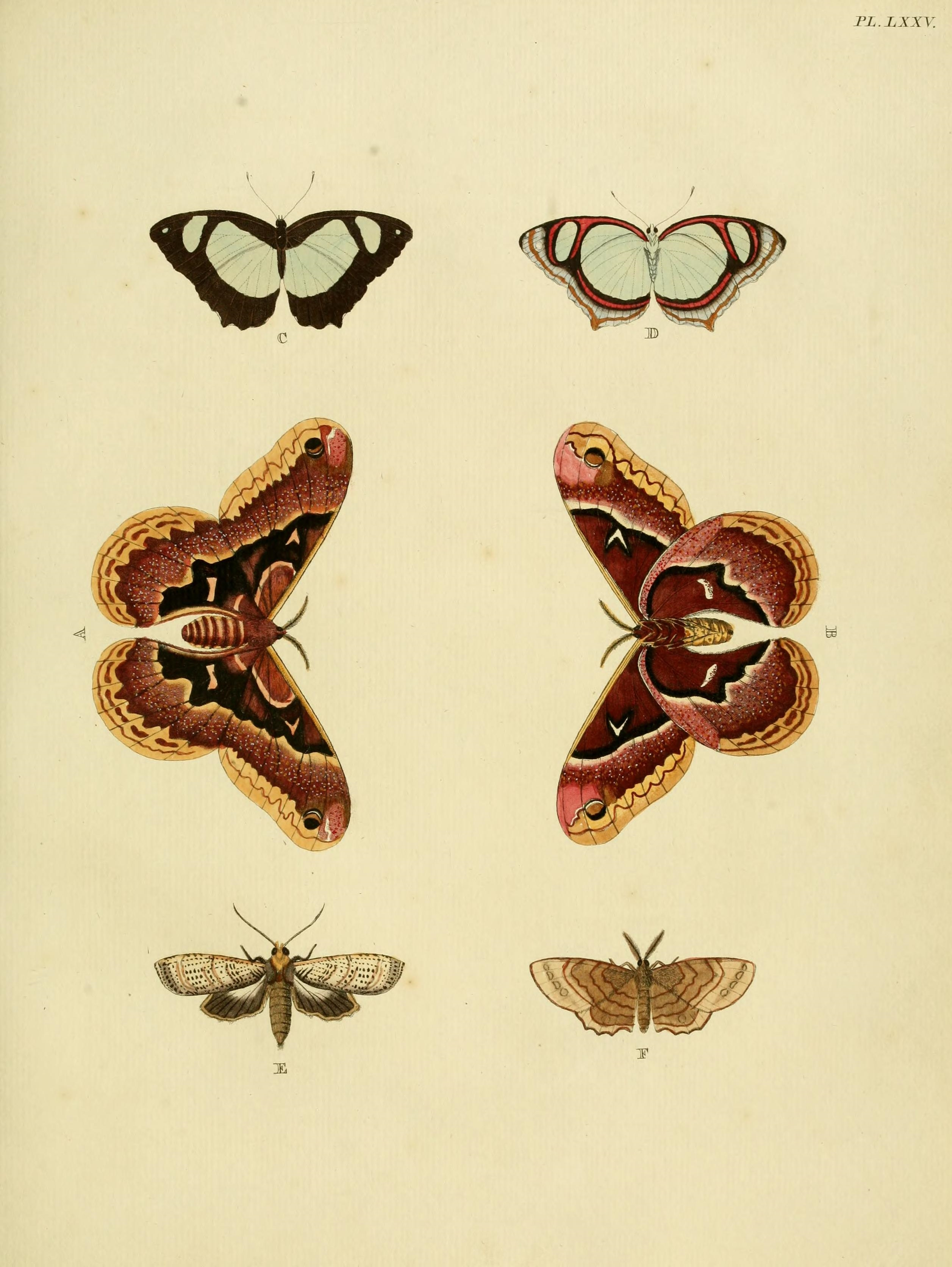
- Cramer&Stoll-uitlandsche kapellen vol. 1- plate

Scientific classification
- Kingdom: Animalia
- Phylum: Arthropoda
- Clade: Pancrustacea
- Class: Insecta
- Order: Lepidoptera
- Infraorder: Heteroneura
- Clade: Eulepidoptera
- Clade: Ditrysia
- Clade: Apoditrysia
- Clade: Obtectomera
- Clade: Macroheterocera
- Superfamily: Bombycoidea
- Family: Phiditiidae; Minet, 1994

Synonyms
- Phiditiinae

= Phiditiidae =

Family of moths

Phiditiidae is a family of moths. The family used to be placed as a subfamily (Phiditiinae) in the family Bombycidae.

== Diversity ==
The family consists of 4 genera and about 25 species.

== Genera ==
- Phiditia Möschler, 1883
- Rolepa Walker, 1855
- Sorocaba Moore, 1882
- Tepilia Walker, 1855
