= National Route 160 (Costa Rica) =

Road in Costa Rica

National Secondary Route 160
- Ruta nacional secundaria 160
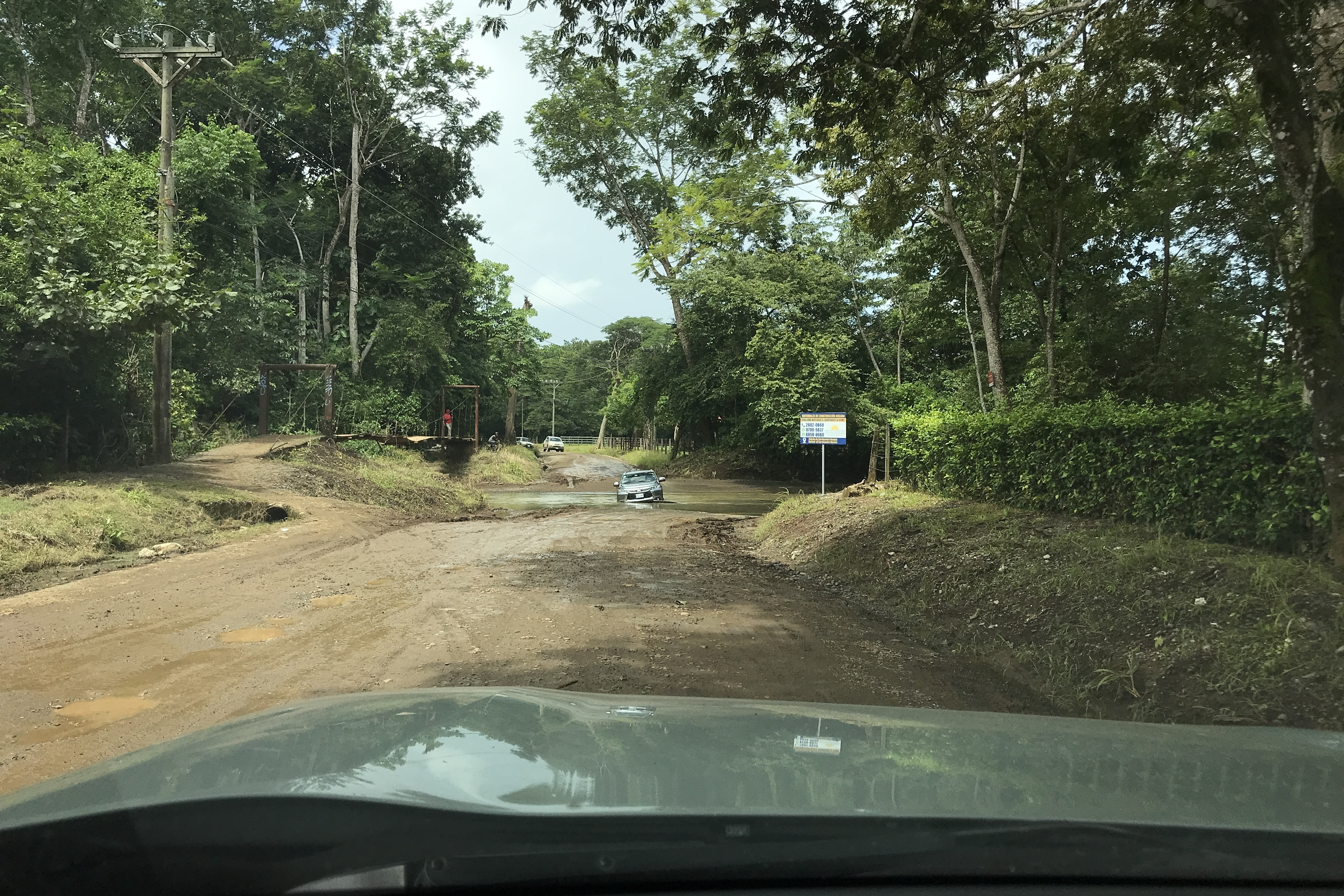
- River crossing between Nosara and Ostional during wet season.

Route information
- Maintained by Ministry of Public Works and Transport
- Length: 229.035 km (142.316 mi)

Major junctions
- Southeast end: Route 21 (Naranjo ferry terminal)
- Route 621 (Road to Paquera ferry terminal); Route 624 (Road to Montezuma); Route 163 (Road to Jicaral); Route 158 (Road to Mansión); Route 150 (Sámara); Route 928 (Seco river); Route 152 (Tamarindo)
- Northwest end: Route 21 (Santa Cruz)

Location
- Country: Costa Rica
- Provinces: Guanacaste, Puntarenas

Highway system
- National Road Network of Costa Rica
← Route 159	→ Route 161

National Secondary Route 160, or just Route 160 (Spanish: Ruta Nacional Secundaria 160, or Ruta 160) is a National Road Route of Costa Rica, located in the Guanacaste and Puntarenas provinces. The road is between Naranjo ferry terminal and Route 21 in Nicoya peninsula, and again with Route 21 at Santa Cruz, Guanacaste.

== Description ==
A mostly gravel road, it approximately follows the coastline of southern section of the Nicoya Peninsula. It starts at the end of Route 21 at the Naranjo ferry terminal, and goes south to the Paquera ferry terminal, this section is paved. From there it turns west and goes near the beach and airport of Tambor and then the town of Cóbano. The northwest bound segment of the road from here to Puerto Carrillo can only be driven in the dry season, and only with off-road capable vehicles. There are many river and creek crossings without bridges.

From Puerto Carrillo the road continues its general northwest direction but becomes a well maintained gravel road that can be driven during the dry season. In the wet season there is a highly chance for a needed river crossing between Nosara and Ostional. It passes many beaches and tourist areas including Sámara, Nosara, and the Ostional Wildlife Refuge. At Veintisiete de Abril the road turns to a northeastern direction, becomes paved and continues until it meets again with Route 21 at Santa Cruz.

In Guanacaste province the route covers Nicoya canton (Sámara and Nosara districts), Santa Cruz canton (Santa Cruz, Veintisiete de Abril, and Cuajiniquil districts), Nandayure canton (Zapotal and Bejuco districts), and Hojancha canton (Puerto Carrillo district).

In Puntarenas province the route covers Puntarenas canton (Paquera and Cóbano districts).

== History ==
Proper asphalt roads and three new bridges are being constructed since April 2018, in the segment between the ferry terminals.
