= Santa Teresa, Costa Rica =

Town in Puntarenas Province, Costa Rica

Coordinates: 9°39′N 85°10′W

Santa Teresa is a small town in Puntarenas Province, Costa Rica. It is located about 150 kilometres (93 mi) west of the capital city of San José. Like other coastal villages on the Nicoya Peninsula such as neighboring Mal Pais, Santa Teresa started as a remote fishing village, relying on agriculture, cattle ranching and small-scale fishing. Today, tourism is the main source of income of most families, and the town hosts surf camps, yoga retreats, and both luxury and budget accommodations.

Visitors come from elsewhere in Costa Rica, from other Latin American countries, from the USA and Canada, and from Europe and Israel.

== Transportation ==
Public transport connects the neighboring towns of Cobano, Montezuma and Mal Pais, and direct bus connections go as far as San José. Car and ATV rentals are also available. There are regular flights to San José from Tambor Airport, approximately 45 minute drive away.

There are several options to travel from San Jose to Santa Teresa, which is located approximately 185 km away.

- 6-hour minibus - 4.5-hour private transfer - 6-hour bus (direct or indirect) - 2-hour flight (including transfers)

To travel from San Jose to Santa Teresa, one may opt for a combination of land and water transportation. The journey entails driving from San Jose to the port of Puntarenas, followed by the procurement of an online ticket for a ferry that takes approximately 1 hour and 15 minutes to cross. Upon arrival at the port of Paquera, travelers can resume their journey by car, which takes an additional 1 hour and 15 minutes to reach the final destination of Santa Teresa.

It is noteworthy that the roads leading to Santa Teresa are characterized by winding and uneven terrain, thereby necessitating the use of a sturdy 4x4 vehicle. The driving experience can be rough, given the bumpy nature of the roads, and it is recommended that motorists adhere to the prescribed speed limit of 70 km/h.
