= Tambor Airport =

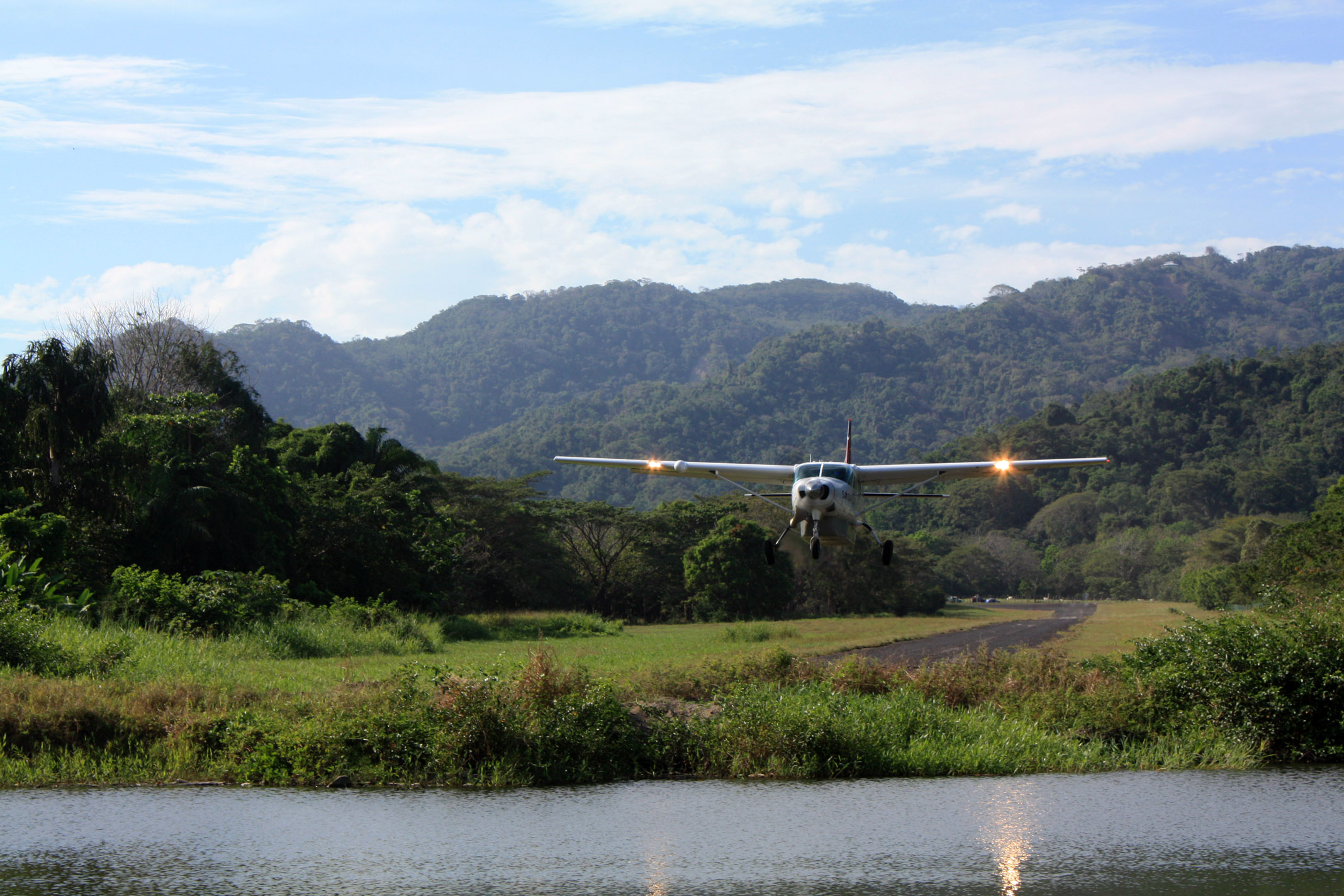
- IATA: TMU; ICAO: MRTR

Summary
- Airport type: Public
- Operator: DGAC
- Location: Tambor, Costa Rica
- Elevation AMSL: 33 ft (10 m)
- Coordinates: 9°44′22″N 85°01′00″W

Map
- Location in Costa Rica

Runways
Direction	Length		Surface
Direction	m	ft	Surface
12/30	830	2,723	Asphalt

Statistics (2014)
- Passengers: 19,382
- Passenger change 13–14: ▼20.2%
- Source: AIP DGAC GCM SkyVector

Tambor Airport (IATA: TMU, ICAO: MRTR) is an airport serving Tambor, Costa Rica. The airport also serves tourist destinations like Mal Pais, Santa Teresa, Montezuma, and the Cabo Blanco Absolute Natural Reserve.

Tambor airport is the sixth-busiest airport in Costa Rica, and the fourth busiest domestic-only after Puerto Jiménez, Quepos and Tamarindo airports. The airport is owned and managed by Costa Rica'a Directorate General of Civil Aviation (DGAC).

== Airlines and destinations ==
Airlines	Destinations
Aerobell Airlines	San José–Tobías Bolaños
Costa Rica Green Airways	San José–Juan Santamaría
Sansa Airlines	San José–Juan Santamaría

== Passenger statistics ==
These data show number of passengers movements into the airport, according to DGAC's Statistical Yearbooks.

Year	2008	2009	2010	2011	2012	2013	2014	2015
Passengers	30,742	27,341	26,668	29,820	29,014	24,298	19,382	T.B.A.
Growth (%)	▼3.27%	▼11.06%	▼2.46%	▲11.82%	▼2.70%	▼16.25%	▼20.23%	T.B.A.
Source: Costa Rica's Directorate General of Civil Aviation (DGAC). Statistical Yearbooks (Years 2008, 2009, 2010, 2011, 2012, 2013, and 2014)

Year	2000	2001	2002	2003	2004	2005	2006	2007
Passengers	19,964	21,372	20,538	21,338	23,539	27,366	29,698	31,782
Growth (%)	N.A.	▲7.05%	▼3.90%	▲3.90%	▲10.31%	▲16.26%	▲8.52%	▲7.02%
Source: Costa Rica's Directorate General of Civil Aviation (DGAC). Statistical Yearbooks (Years 2000–2005, 2006, and 2007,)

== See also ==
- Transport in Costa Rica
- List of airports in Costa Rica
