= Zapotal District =

Zapotal
- District and village
- Location in Costa Rica
- Coordinates: 10°00′02″N 85°18′20″W
- Country: Costa Rica
- Province: Guanacaste
- Canton: Nandayure

Area
  - Total: 103.53 km^{2} (39.97 sq mi)
- Elevation: 500 m (1,600 ft)

Population (June 2013)
  - Total: 1,242
  - Density: 12.00/km^{2} (31.07/sq mi)
- Postal code: 50903

Zapotal District is a district and village in the canton of Nandayure, Guanacaste Province in Costa Rica.

Located on the Nicoya Peninsula, the district has a population of around 1,250 people.

== Villages ==
Administrative center of the district is the village of Zapotal.

Other villages in the district are Altos de Mora, Cabeceras de Río Ora, Camaronal, Carmen, Cuesta Bijagua, Leona, Manzanales, Río Blanco Este, Río de Oro, Río Ora, San Martín, San Pedro and Soledad.
