= Playa Coyote, Costa Rica =

Playa Coyote
- Beach
- Location in Costa Rica
- Coordinates: 09°48′00″N 85°17′00″W
- Country: Costa Rica
- Province: Guanacaste
- Canton: Nandayure
- Elevation: 8 m (26 ft)
- Postal code: 50906

Playa Coyote, also known as Puerto Coyote, is a beach at San Francisco de Coyote, in the canton of Nandayure, Guanacaste Province in Costa Rica. Located on the Nicoya Peninsula, it is situated at the Pacific Ocean at Ruta 160.

== The beach ==
Playa Coyote is divided by a mangrove river, Rio Jabillo, into two parts. The lower part is called Punta Coyote and is made up of a shallow horseshoe-shaped sandy beach leading to the cliffy land-tongue. The upper part, also called Playa Costa de Oro, represents a long palm-covered beachfront that ends at Playa San Miguel. The mangroves are home to species-rich birds, mammals and reptile colonies. Playa Coyote was awarded for the first time in 2016 the blue ribbon ("Bandera Azul Ecológica") for cleanliness and environmental sustainability. The beach is known for swimming, but surfers also find good conditions here. There are two small restaurants on the beach with limited hours. It is located 5 kilometers from the small town of San Francisco de Coyote.

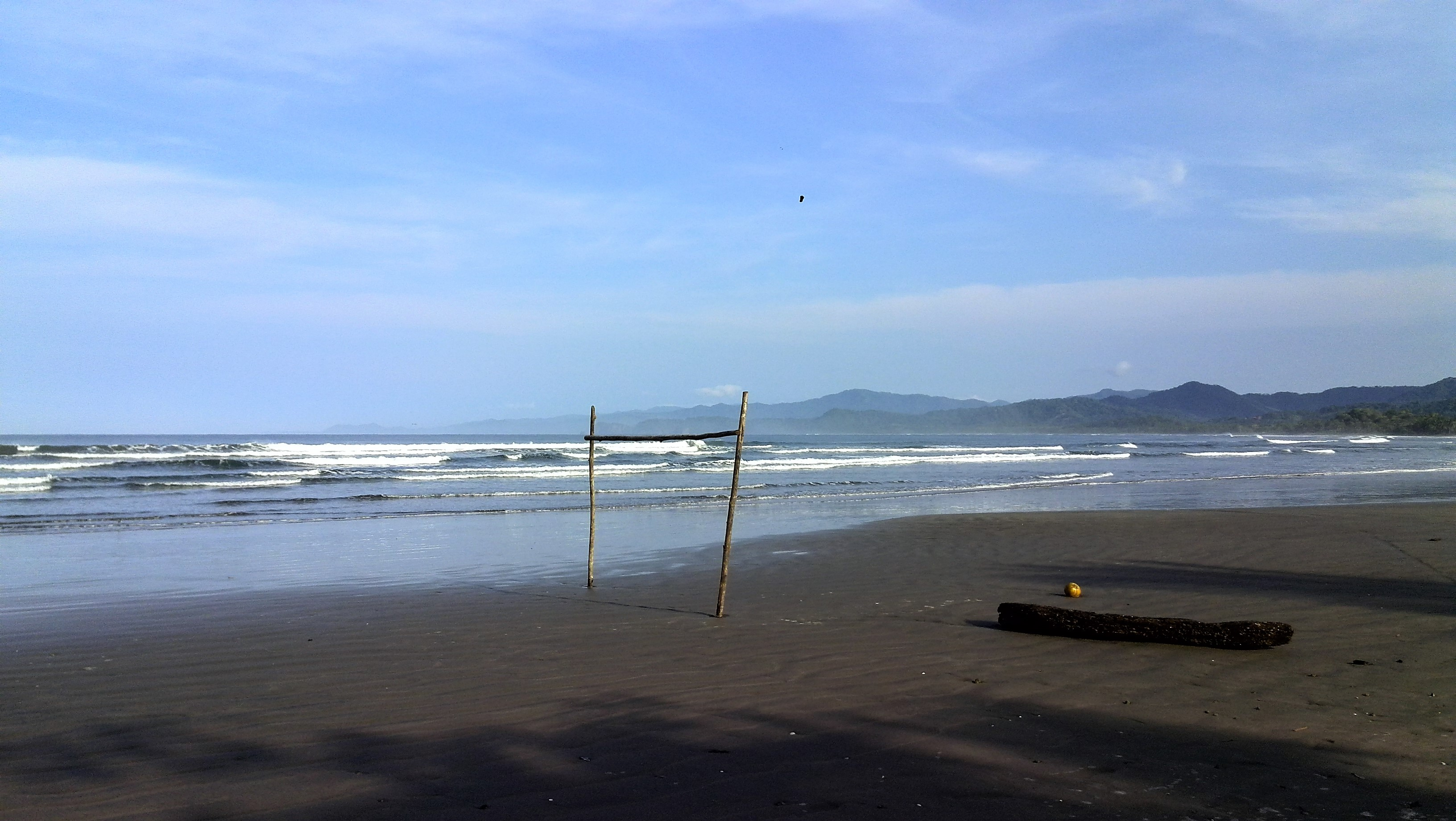
Playa Coyote

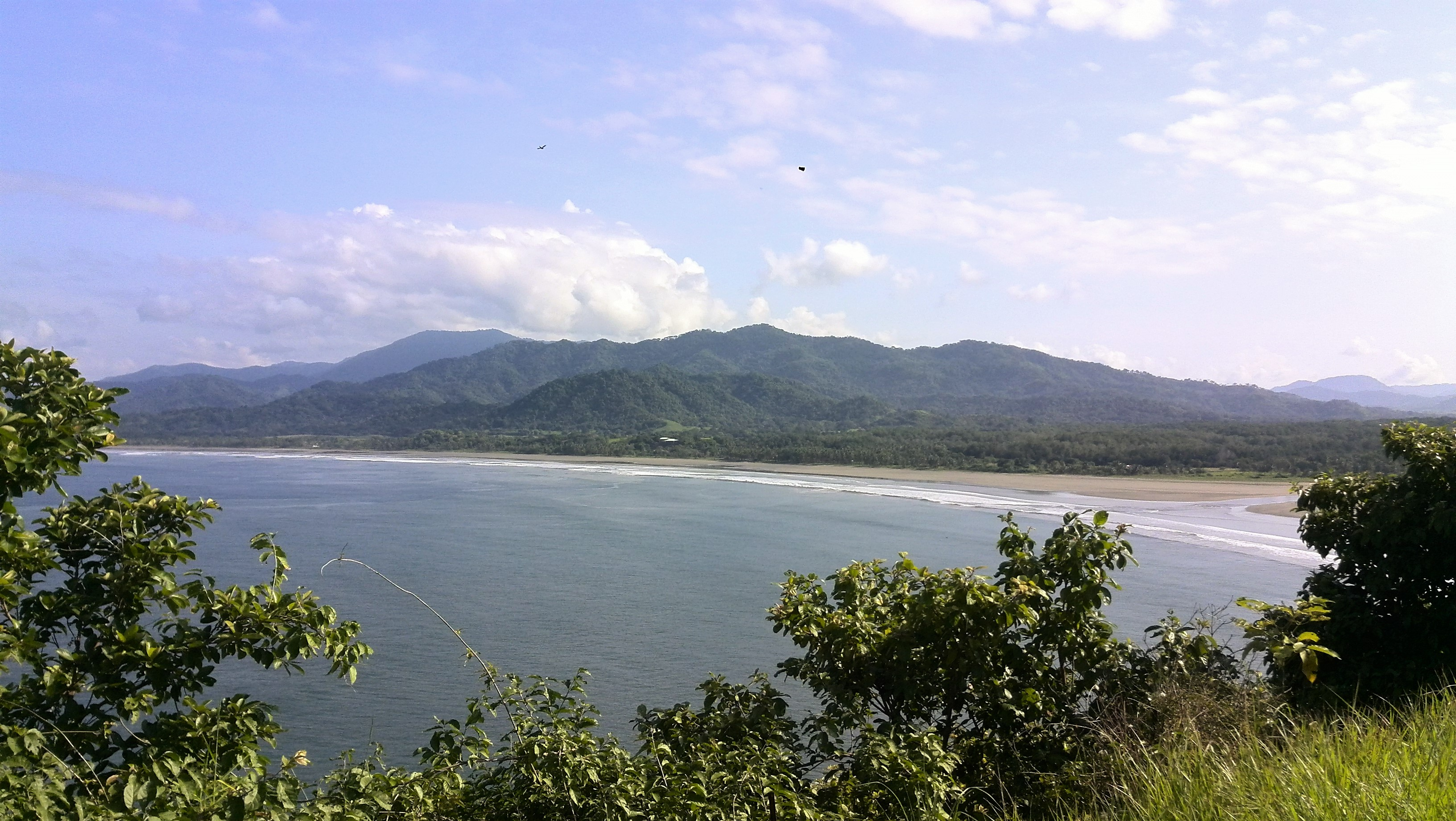
Playa Coyote from Punta Coyote hills

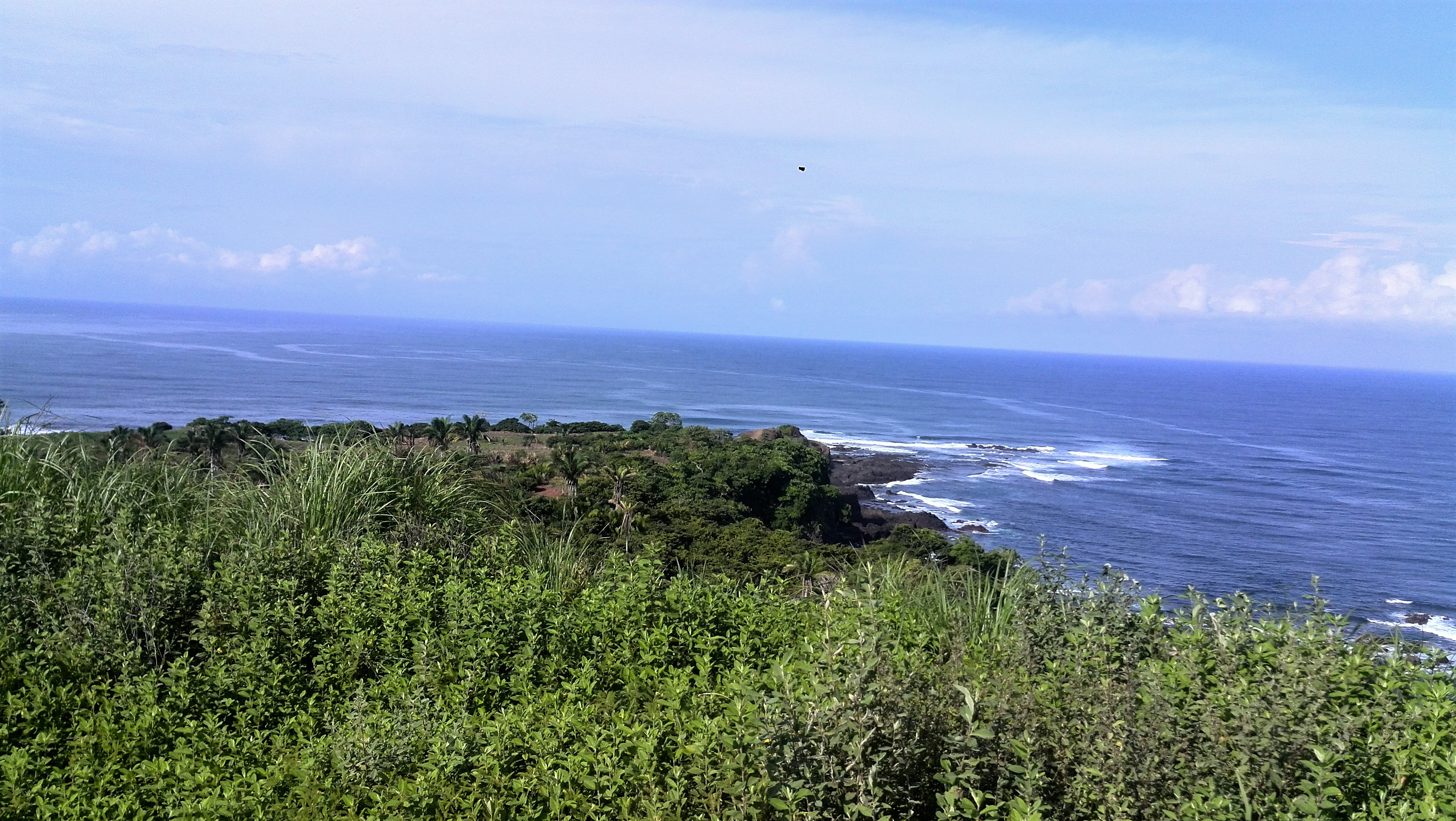
Punta Coyote

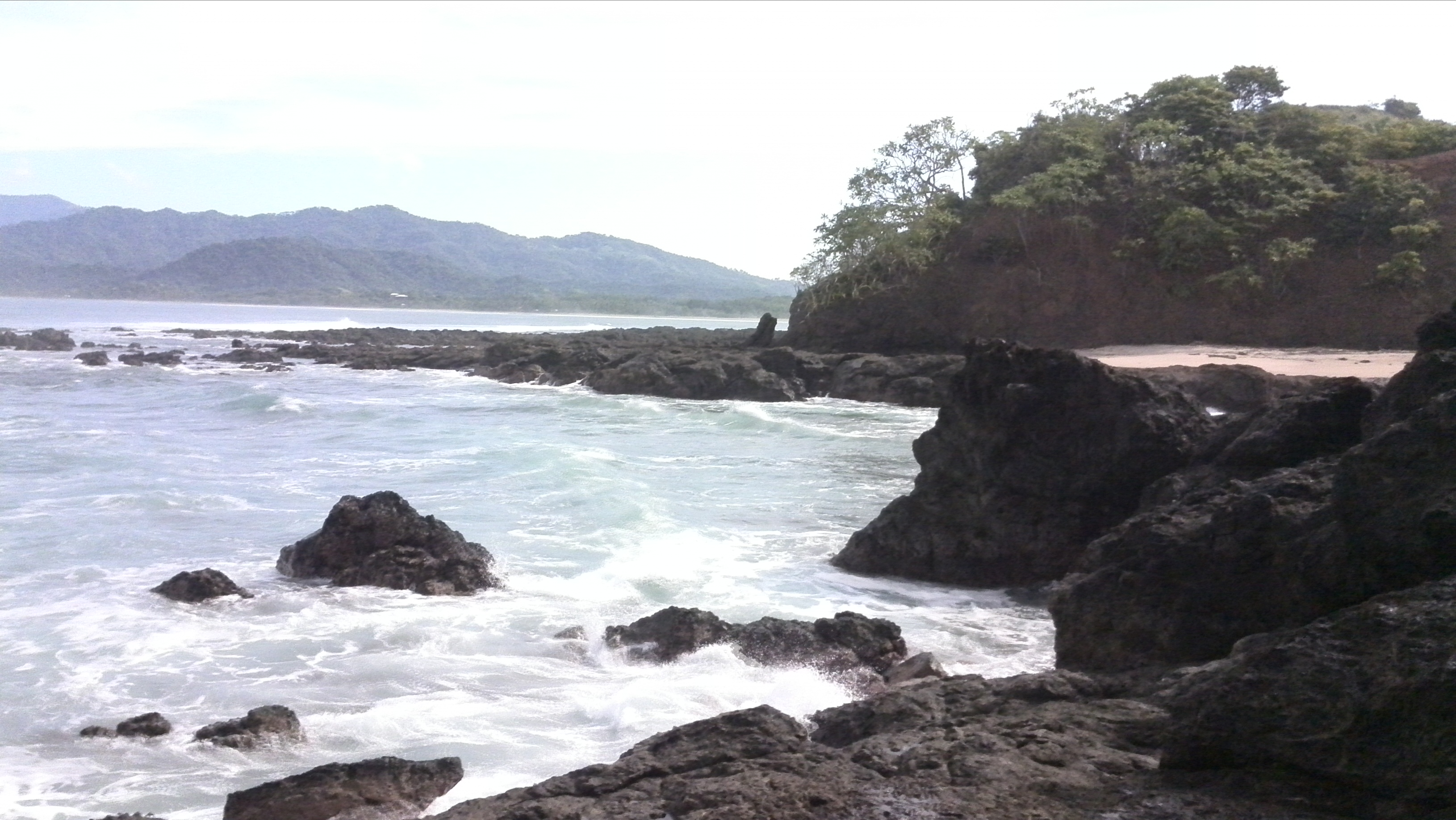
Little bay at Punta Coyote

The sea area around Playa Coyote is protected coral reefs with fishing only allowed for local fishermen. A coast guard patrol station is situated at the mouth of the beach.
