= Nicoya (disambiguation) =

Nicoya may refer to:

- Places
  - Nicoya, a district in Nicoya canton in Costa Rica
  - Nicoya, a canton in Guanacaste Province, Costa Rica
  - Partido de Nicoya, an historical administrative unit annexed to Costa Rica
- Geological features
  - Nicoya Peninsula
  - Nicoya Gulf
- Culture
  - Nicoya culture - Pre-Columbian culture of Costa Rica and Nicaragua
- Organisms
  - Nicoya (crab), a genus of crabs
