= Santa Rita District =

Santa Rita District may refer to:

- Santa Rita District, Paraguay, a district in Alto Paraná Department, Paraguay
- Santa Rita District, Nandayure, in Nandayure Canton, Guanacaste Province, Costa Rica
