= San Pablo District, Nandayure =

District in Nandayure canton, Guanacaste province, Costa Rica

San Pablo
- District
- San Pablo district
- San Pablo district location in Costa Rica
- Coordinates: 10.0205781°N 85.1987161°W
- Country: Costa Rica
- Province: Guanacaste
- Canton: Nandayure

Area
  - Total: 78.13 km^{2} (30.17 sq mi)
- Elevation: 22 m (72 ft)

Population (2011)
  - Total: 2,207
  - Density: 28.25/km^{2} (73.16/sq mi)
- Time zone: UTC−06:00
- Postal code: 50904

San Pablo is a district of the Nandayure canton, in the Guanacaste province of Costa Rica. Located on the Nicoya Peninsula.

== Geography ==
San Pablo has an area of 78.13 km^{2} (30.17 sq mi) and an elevation of 22 metres.

== Villages ==
Administrative center of the district is the village of San Pablo.

Other villages in the district are Canjel, Canjelito, Corozal Oeste, Chamarro, Isla Berrugate, Pavones, Puerto Thiel and San Pablo Viejo.

== Demographics ==
Historical population
Census	Pop.	±% p.a.
1963	1,599	—
1973	1,485	−0.74%
1984	1,299	−1.21%
2000	1,734	+1.82%
2011	2,207	+2.22%
2022	2,355	+0.59%
Source: Instituto Nacional de Estadística y Censos; Centro Centroamericano de Población

For the 2011 census, San Pablo had a population of 2,207 inhabitants.

== Transportation ==
=== Road transportation ===
The district is covered by the following road routes:

- National Route 21
- National Route 623
