= Carmen Beach =

- Coastal resort
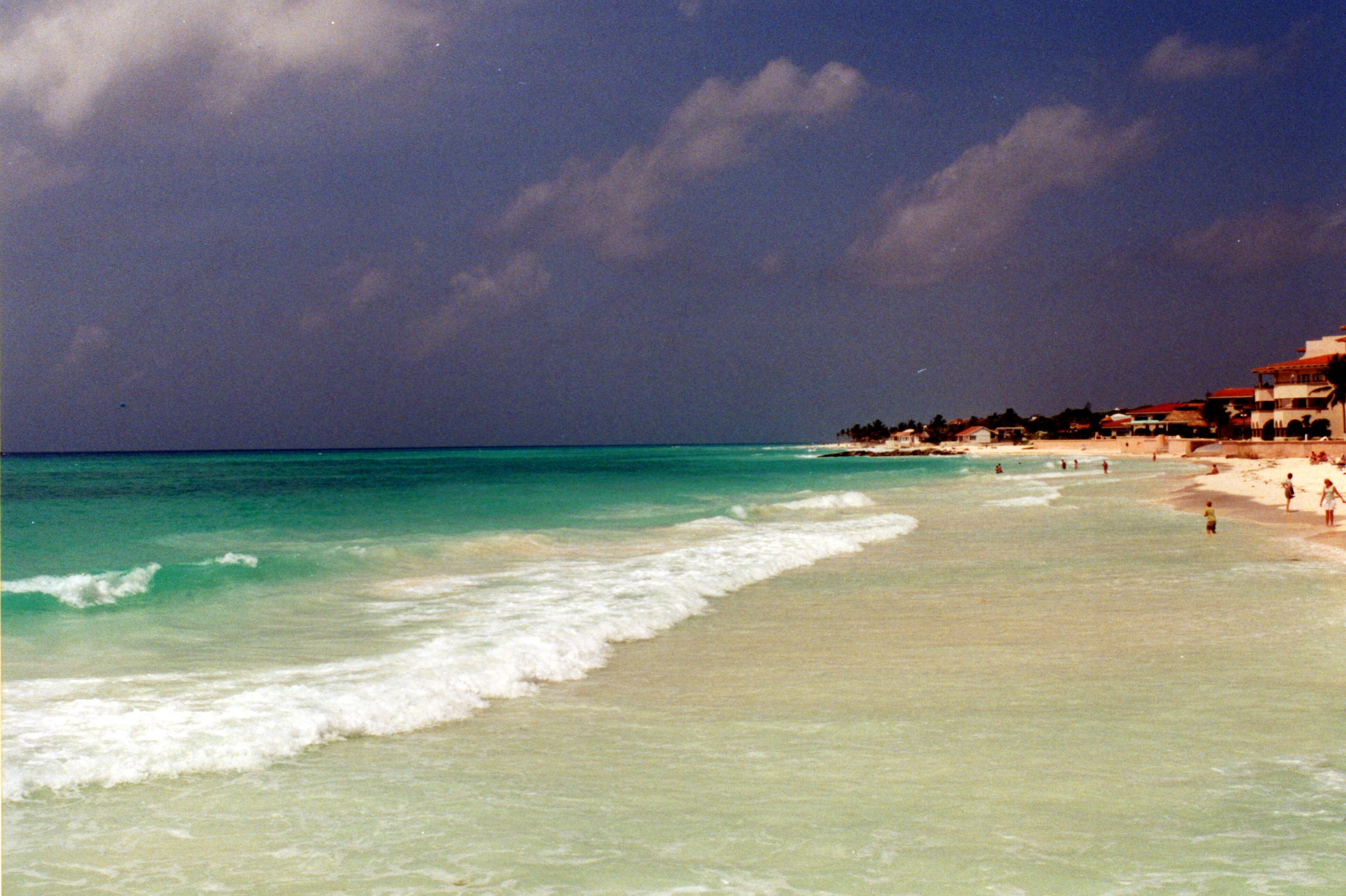
- The beach at Carmen Beach

- Map showing location of Carmen Beach
- Coordinates: 9°37′40.74″N 85°9′1.15″W
- Country: Costa Rica
- Province: Puntarenas

Area
  - Land: 1.86 km^{2} (0.72 sq mi)
- Elevation: 23 m (75 ft)

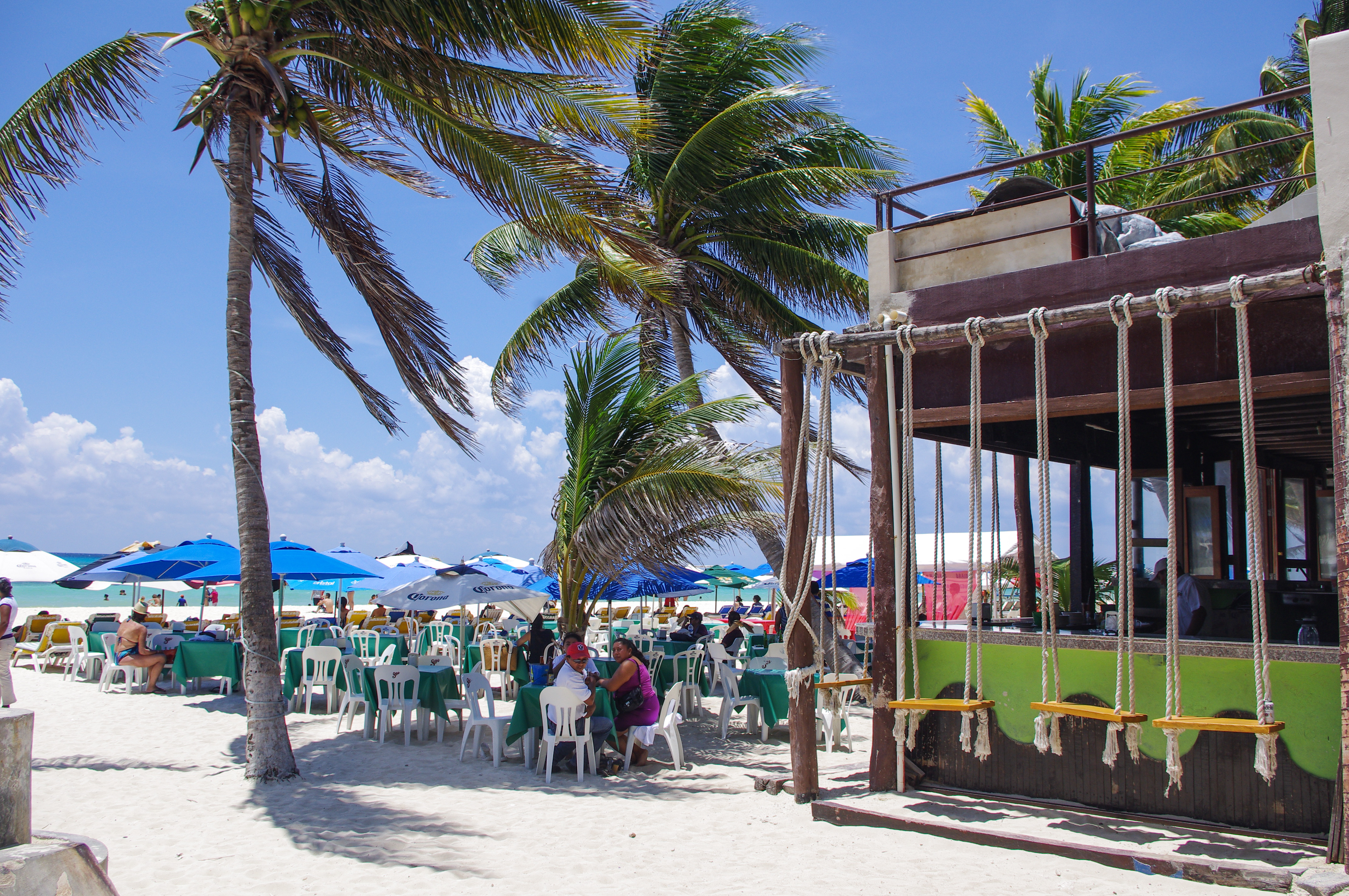
One of the many bars by the beach.

Carmen Beach is a seaside resort in Puntarenas Province, Costa Rica. It consists of a white sand beach, a small coastal town, and some buildings perched on the foothills of the Cabo Blanco . The force of the waves is lower than the neighbouring beaches.
