= La Ceiba Wildlife Refuge =

- Interactive map of La Ceiba Wildlife Refuge
- Location: Costa Rica
- Coordinates: 9.809113°N 84.995192°W
- Area: 674 acres (2.73 km^{2})
- Established: 1995
- Governing body: National System of Conservation Areas (SINAC)

The La Ceiba Wildlife Refuge is a private wildlife refuge in Costa Rica, part of the Tempisque Conservation Area, which protects tropical forest on the Nicoya Peninsula near the small village of San Rafael in Paquera District in the Puntarenas Province.

The area protected is covered by tropical dry forest and contains a small camping site and two cabins inside the reserve used by ecotourists, which helps fund the project.
