= Cueva Murciélago Wildlife Refuge =

Wildlife refuge in Costa Rica

Cueva Murcielago Wildlife Refuge
- Location within Costa Rica
- Location: Puntarenas Province, Costa Rica
- Coordinates: 9.5887°N 85.1385°W
- Area: 183 acres (0.74 km^{2})
- Established: 1998
- Governing body: National System of Conservation Areas (SINAC)

The Cueva Murciélago Wildlife Refuge is a wildlife refuge of Costa Rica, part of the Tempisque Conservation Area, and protects tropical forest in the coastal areas of the southern Nicoya Peninsula near Cabuya.
