= Bejuco District =

District in Nandayure canton, Guanacaste province, Costa Rica

Bejuco
- District
- Interactive map of Bejuco
- Bejuco district location in Costa Rica
- Coordinates: 9.8261518°N 85.3012604°W
- Country: Costa Rica
- Province: Guanacaste
- Canton: Nandayure

Area
  - Total: 262.17 km^{2} (101.22 sq mi)
- Elevation: 10 m (33 ft)

Population (2011)
  - Total: 3,026
  - Density: 11.54/km^{2} (29.89/sq mi)
- Time zone: UTC−06:00
- Postal code: 50906

Bejuco is a district of the Nandayure canton, in the Guanacaste province of Costa Rica. Located on the Nicoya Peninsula.

== Geography ==
Bejuco has an area of 262.17 km^{2} (101.22 sq mi) and an elevation of 10 metres.

== Villages ==
Administrative center of the district is the village of Bejuco.

Other villages in the district are Caletas, Candelillo, Corozalito, Chiruta, Chompipe (partly), I Griega, Islita, Jabilla, Jabillos, Maicillal, Maquencal, Milagro, Millal, Mono, Pampas, Paso Vigas, Pecal, Playa Coyote, Playa San Miguel, Pueblo Nuevo, Punta Bejuco, Puerto Coyote, Quebrada Nando, Quebrada Seca, Rancho Floriana, San Francisco de Coyote, San Gabriel, San Miguel, Triunfo and Zapote.

== Demographics ==
Historical population
Census	Pop.	±% p.a.
1963	3,898	—
1973	3,824	−0.19%
1984	2,382	−4.21%
2000	2,489	+0.28%
2011	3,026	+1.79%
2022	2,993	−0.10%
Source: Instituto Nacional de Estadística y Censos; Centro Centroamericano de Población

For the 2011 census, Bejuco had a population of 3,026 inhabitants.

== Transportation ==
=== Road transportation ===
The district is covered by the following road routes:

- National Route 160
- National Route 163
- National Route 623
- National Route 903
- National Route 915
