= Romelia Wildlife Refuge =

Nature reserve

- Location within Costa Rica
- Location: Puntarenas Province, Costa Rica
- Nearest city: Montezuma
- Coordinates: 9°40′34″N 85°02′38″W
- Area: 415 acres (1.68 km^{2})
- Established: 1997
- Governing body: National System of Conservation Areas (SINAC)

The Romelia Wildlife Refuge is a 415-acre (1.68 km^{2}) Wildlife refuge in Costa Rica, part of the Tempisque Conservation Area, near Montezuma, Costa Rica on the Nicoya Peninsula.
