= Porvenir District =

District in Nandayure canton, Guanacaste province, Costa Rica

Porvenir
- District
- Porvenir district
- Porvenir district location in Costa Rica
- Coordinates: 9.9180877°N 85.2735782°W
- Country: Costa Rica
- Province: Guanacaste
- Canton: Nandayure

Area
  - Total: 40.17 km^{2} (15.51 sq mi)
- Elevation: 625 m (2,051 ft)

Population (2011)
  - Total: 741
  - Density: 18.4/km^{2} (47.8/sq mi)
- Time zone: UTC−06:00
- Postal code: 50905

Porvenir is a district of the Nandayure canton, in the Guanacaste province of Costa Rica. Located on the Nicoya Peninsula.

== Geography ==
Porvenir has an area of 40.17 km^{2} and an elevation of 625 metres.

== Villages ==
The administrative center of the district is the village of Cerro Azul.

Other villages in the district are Ángeles, Bellavista, Cabeceras de Río Bejuco, Chompipe (partly), Delicias, Quebrada Grande and San Josecito.

== Demographics ==
Historical population
Census	Pop.	±% p.a.
1963	1,881	—
1973	1,543	−1.96%
1984	1,338	−1.29%
2000	994	−1.84%
2011	741	−2.63%
2022	769	+0.34%
Source: Instituto Nacional de Estadística y Censos; Centro Centroamericano de Población

For the 2011 census, Porvenir had a population of 741 inhabitants.

== Transportation ==
=== Road transportation ===
The district is covered by the following road routes:

- National Route 903
