= Cóbano =

District in Puntarenas canton, Puntarenas province, Costa Rica

- District
- Interactive map of Cóbano
- Cóbano district location in Costa Rica
- Coordinates: 9.6759164°N 85.11381°W
- Country: Costa Rica
- Province: Puntarenas
- Canton: Puntarenas
- Creation: 4 August 1971

Area
  - Total: 317.06 km^{2} (122.42 sq mi)
- Elevation: 158 m (518 ft)

Population (2011)
  - Total: 7,494
  - Density: 23.64/km^{2} (61.22/sq mi)
- Time zone: UTC−06:00
- Postal code: 60111

Cóbano is a district of the Puntarenas canton, in the Puntarenas province of Costa Rica.

== History ==
During the colonial period the entire Nicoya Peninsula was administratively part of the Partido de Nicoya (nowadays Guanacaste), it was at the beginning of the 20th century that President Alfredo González Flores signed a decree that transferred the administration of Lepanto along with Paquera and Cóbano (towns in the extreme south of the Nicoya peninsula) to the province of Puntarenas. This was because at that time it was faster to reach Paquera by sea by boat from Puntarenas, than by the existing land routes to Nicoya. At present there is a certain political impulse in Guanacaste to administratively reincorporate the entire Nicoya peninsula into the province of Guanacaste, arguing that the Inter-American Highway allows rapid land communication with Guanacaste, in addition they argue that the word Guanacaste is internationally associated with tourism and that therefore probably the beaches of the south of the peninsula are more visited by foreign tourists.

Cóbano was created a separate district on 4 August 1971 by Decreto Ejecutivo 1897-G, segregating from the Paquera District.

== Geography ==
Cóbano has an area of 317.06 km^{2} (122.42 sq mi) and an elevation of 158 metres.

== Demographics ==
Historical population
Census	Pop.	±% p.a.
1984	3,596	—
2000	4,576	+1.52%
2011	7,494	+4.59%
2022	10,490	+3.10%
Source: Instituto Nacional de Estadística y Censos; Centro Centroamericano de Población

For the 2011 census, Cóbano had a population of 7,494 inhabitants.

== Transportation ==
=== Road transportation ===
The district is covered by the following road routes:

- National Route 160
- National Route 624
