= Cabuya =

Cabuya may refer to:

- Fique, a natural fiber
- Cabuya, Coclé, Panama
- Cabuya, Herrera, Panama
- Cabuya, Panamá Oeste, Panama
- Cabuya, Costa Rica
