= Lepanto District =

District in Puntarenas canton, Puntarenas province, Costa Rica

Lepanto
- District
- Interactive map of Lepanto
- Lepanto district location in Costa Rica
- Coordinates: 9.8880502°N 85.1330462°W
- Country: Costa Rica
- Province: Puntarenas
- Canton: Puntarenas

Area
  - Total: 424.74 km^{2} (163.99 sq mi)
- Elevation: 6 m (20 ft)

Population (2011)
  - Total: 9,502
  - Density: 22.37/km^{2} (57.94/sq mi)
- Time zone: UTC−06:00
- Postal code: 60104

Lepanto is a district of the Puntarenas canton, in the Puntarenas province of Costa Rica.

== History ==
During the colonial period the entire Nicoya Peninsula was administratively part of the Partido de Nicoya (nowadays Guanacaste), it was at the beginning of the 20th century that President Alfredo González Flores signed a decree that transferred the administration of Lepanto along with Paquera and Cóbano (towns in the extreme south of the Nicoya peninsula) to the province of Puntarenas. This was due to the fact that at that time it was faster to reach Paquera by sea by boat from Puntarenas, than by the existing land routes to Nicoya. At present there is a certain political impulse in Guanacaste to administratively reincorporate the entire Nicoya peninsula into the province of Guanacaste, arguing that the Inter-American Highway allows rapid land communication with Guanacaste, in addition they argue that the word Guanacaste is internationally associated with tourism and that therefore probably the beaches of the south of the peninsula are more visited by foreign tourists.

== Geography ==
Lepanto has an area of 424.74 km^{2} (163.99 sq mi) and an elevation of 6 metres.

== Demographics ==
Historical population
Census	Pop.	±% p.a.
1883	181	—
1892	138	−2.97%
1927	2,142	+8.15%
1950	3,470	+2.12%
1963	10,047	+8.52%
1973	9,928	−0.12%
1984	9,064	−0.82%
2000	8,928	−0.09%
2011	9,502	+0.57%
2022	12,163	+2.27%
Source: Instituto Nacional de Estadística y Censos; Centro Centroamericano de Población

For the 2011 census, Lepanto had a population of 9,502 inhabitants.

== Transportation ==
=== Road transportation ===
The district is covered by the following road routes:

- National Route 21
- National Route 163
- National Route 623
