= Cabuya, Costa Rica =

Village in Puntarenas Province, Costa Rica

Coordinates: 9.183°N 83.267°W

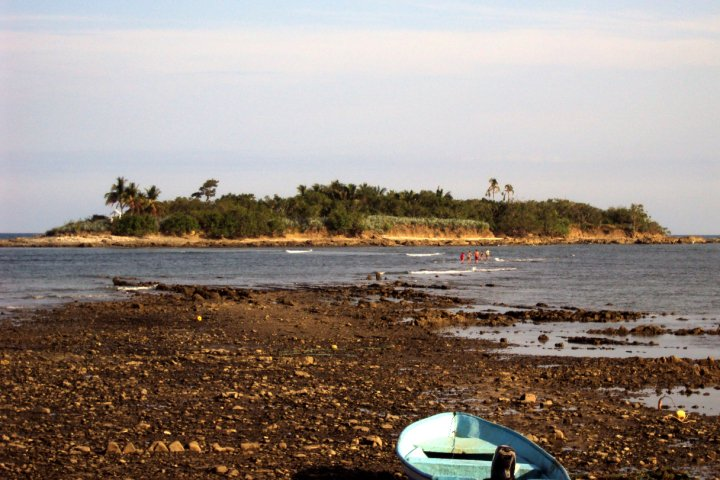
Cabuya Island Cemetery

Cabuya is a small fishing village on the Nicoya Peninsula of Costa Rica.

It is located a few miles from the tourist areas of Montezuma and Santa Teresa, and is visited by hikers, mountain bikers, surfers and water sports enthusiasts.

The first nature reserve in Costa Rica, Cabo Blanco Reserva is located at Cabuya. Near the village is a Yoga retreat.

Off the coast is Isla de Cabuya, the Cemetery Island. Cabuya Island is accessible by foot at low tide and dates back to pre-Columbian times. It is still used a burial ground. The reef that surrounds the island is used for fishing and snorkeling.
