= National Route 161 (Costa Rica) =

National Road Route in Costa Rica

National Secondary Route 161
- Ruta nacional secundaria 161

Route information
- Maintained by Ministry of Public Works and Transport
- Length: 5.195 km (3.228 mi)

Location
- Country: Costa Rica
- Provinces: Guanacaste

Highway system
- National Road Network of Costa Rica
← Route 160	→ Route 163

National Secondary Route 161, or just Route 161 (Spanish: Ruta Nacional Secundaria 161, or Ruta 161) is a National Road Route of Costa Rica located in the Guanacaste province.

== Description ==
In Guanacaste province the route covers Nandayure canton (Carmona and Santa Rita districts).
