= National Route 902 (Costa Rica) =

National Road Route in Costa Rica

National Tertiary Route 902
- Ruta nacional terciaria 902

Route information
- Maintained by Ministry of Public Works and Transport
- Length: 27.220 km (16.914 mi)

Location
- Country: Costa Rica
- Provinces: Guanacaste

Highway system
- National Road Network of Costa Rica
← Route 901	→ Route 903

National Tertiary Route 902, or just Route 902 (Spanish: Ruta Nacional Terciaria 902, or Ruta 902) is a National Road Route of Costa Rica, located in the Guanacaste province.

== Description ==
In Guanacaste province the route covers Nandayure canton (Carmona and Zapotal districts) and Hojancha canton (Hojancha and Monte Romo districts).
