= National Route 915 (Costa Rica) =

National Road Route in Costa Rica

National Tertiary Route 915
- Ruta nacional terciaria 915

Route information
- Maintained by Ministry of Public Works and Transport
- Length: 16.490 km (10.246 mi)

Location
- Country: Costa Rica
- Provinces: Guanacaste

Highway system
- National Road Network of Costa Rica
← Route 914	→ Route 917

National Tertiary Route 915, or just Route 915 (Spanish: Ruta Nacional Terciaria 915, or Ruta 915) is a National Road Route of Costa Rica, located in the Guanacaste province.

== Description ==
In Guanacaste province the route covers Nandayure canton (Bejuco district).
