= Carmona District, Nandayure =

District in Guanacaste province, Costa Rica

Carmona
- District
- Interactive map of Carmona
- Carmona district location in Costa Rica
- Coordinates: 9.9918902°N 85.2578586°W
- Country: Costa Rica
- Province: Guanacaste
- Canton: Nandayure

Area
  - Total: 31.83 km^{2} (12.29 sq mi)
- Elevation: 80 m (260 ft)

Population (2011)
  - Total: 2,486
  - Density: 78.10/km^{2} (202.3/sq mi)
- Time zone: UTC−06:00
- Postal code: 50901

Carmona is a district of the Nandayure canton, in the Guanacaste province of Costa Rica.

== Geography ==
Carmona has an area of 31.83 km^{2} (12.29 sq mi) and an elevation of 80 metres.

== Villages ==
Administrative center of the district is the village of Carmona.

Other villages in the district are Camas, Limones, Maquenco, San Rafael and Vista de Mar.

== Demographics ==
Historical population
Census	Pop.	±% p.a.
1963	1,223	—
1973	1,629	+2.91%
1984	1,654	+0.14%
2000	2,012	+1.23%
2011	2,486	+1.94%
2022	2,638	+0.54%
Source: Instituto Nacional de Estadística y Censos; Centro Centroamericano de Población

For the 2011 census, Carmona had a population of 2,486 inhabitants.

== Transportation ==
=== Road transportation ===
The district is covered by the following road routes:

- National Route 161
- National Route 902
- National Route 903
