= Zapotal District, Nandayure =

District in Nandayure canton, Guanacaste province, Costa Rica

Zapotal
- District
- Zapotal district
- Zapotal district location in Costa Rica
- Coordinates: 9.9363428°N 85.3710653°W
- Country: Costa Rica
- Province: Guanacaste
- Canton: Nandayure

Area
  - Total: 105.18 km^{2} (40.61 sq mi)
- Elevation: 500 m (1,600 ft)

Population (2011)
  - Total: 1,215
  - Density: 11.55/km^{2} (29.92/sq mi)
- Time zone: UTC−06:00
- Postal code: 50903

Zapotal is a district of the Nandayure canton, in the Guanacaste province of Costa Rica.

== Geography ==
Zapotal has an area of 105.18 km^{2} (40.61 sq mi) and an elevation of 500 metres.

== Demographics ==
Historical population
Census	Pop.	±% p.a.
1963	1,690	—
1973	1,719	+0.17%
1984	1,508	−1.18%
2000	1,267	−1.08%
2011	1,215	−0.38%
2022	1,332	+0.84%
Source: Instituto Nacional de Estadística y Censos; Centro Centroamericano de Población

For the 2011 census, Zapotal had a population of 1,215 inhabitants.

== Transportation ==
=== Road transportation ===
The district is covered by the following road routes:

- National Route 160
- National Route 901
- National Route 902
