= National Route 623 (Costa Rica) =

National Road Route in Costa Rica

National Tertiary Route 623
- Ruta nacional terciaria 623

Route information
- Maintained by Ministry of Public Works and Transport
- Length: 13.650 km (8.482 mi)

Location
- Country: Costa Rica
- Provinces: Guanacaste, Puntarenas

Highway system
- National Road Network of Costa Rica
← Route 622	→ Route 624

National Tertiary Route 623, or just Route 623 (Spanish: Ruta Nacional Terciaria 623, or Ruta 623) is a National Road Route of Costa Rica, located in the Guanacaste, Puntarenas provinces.

== Description ==
In Guanacaste province the route covers Nandayure canton (San Pablo, Bejuco districts).

In Puntarenas province the route covers Puntarenas canton (Lepanto district).
