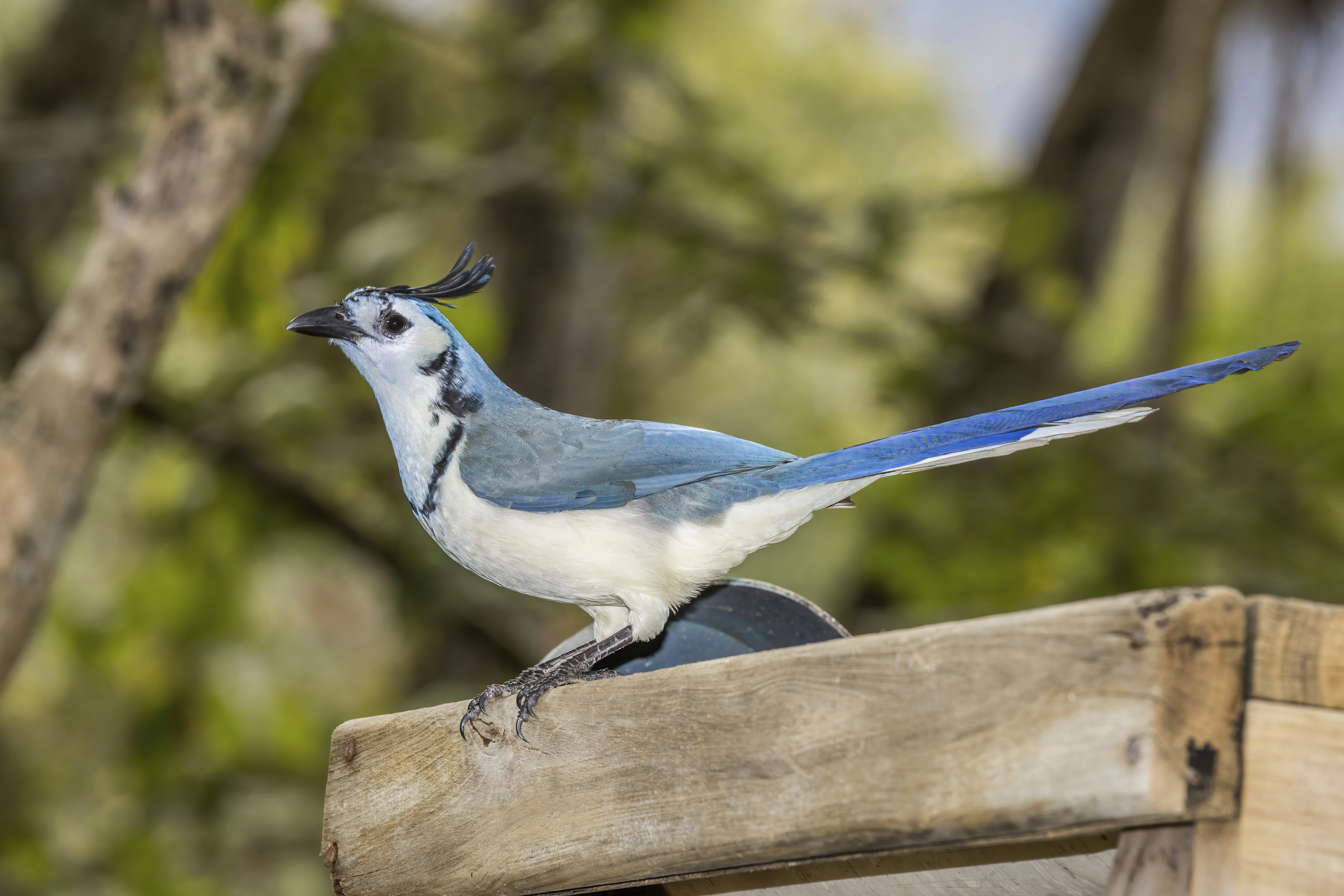
- C. f. pompata, Honduras

Conservation status
- Least Concern (IUCN 3.1)

Scientific classification
- Kingdom: Animalia
- Phylum: Chordata
- Class: Aves
- Order: Passeriformes
- Family: Corvidae
- Genus: Cyanocorax
- Species: C. formosus

Binomial name
- Cyanocorax formosus (Swainson, 1827)

Synonyms
- Pica formosa (protonym); Calocitta formosa

= White-throated magpie-jay =

Species of bird

The white-throated magpie-jay (Cyanocorax formosus) is a large Central American species of magpie-jay. It ranges in Pacific-slope thorn forest from Jalisco, Mexico, to Northern Puntarenas, Costa Rica. Magpie-jays are noisy, gregarious birds, often traveling in easy-to-find flocks, mobbing their observers.

== Taxonomy ==
The white-throated magpie-jay was formally described in 1827 by the English naturalist William Swainson from a specimen that had been collected by the naturalist William Bullock in Temascaltepec, Mexico. Swainson coined the binomial name Pica formosa. The specific epithet is from the Latin formosus meaning "beautiful". The white-throated magpie-jay and the black-throated magpie-jay were formerly placed in their own genus Calocitta. When molecular phylogenetic studies found that the genus Cyanocorax was paraphyletic relative to Calocitta, the two species were subsumed into Cyanocorax to resolve the paraphyly.

Three subspecies are recognised:

- C. f. formosus (Swainson, 1827) – Colima, Michoacán and Puebla south to Oaxaca (southwest Mexico)
- C. f. azureus (Nelson, 1897) – Oaxaca and Chiapas (southeast Mexico) and west Guatemala
- C. f. pompatus (Bangs, 1914) – east Chiapas (southeast Mexico) and east Guatemala to northwest Costa Rica

The white-throated magpie-jay hybridizes in Jalisco with the black-throated magpie-jay (C. colliei), with which it forms a superspecies.

== Description ==
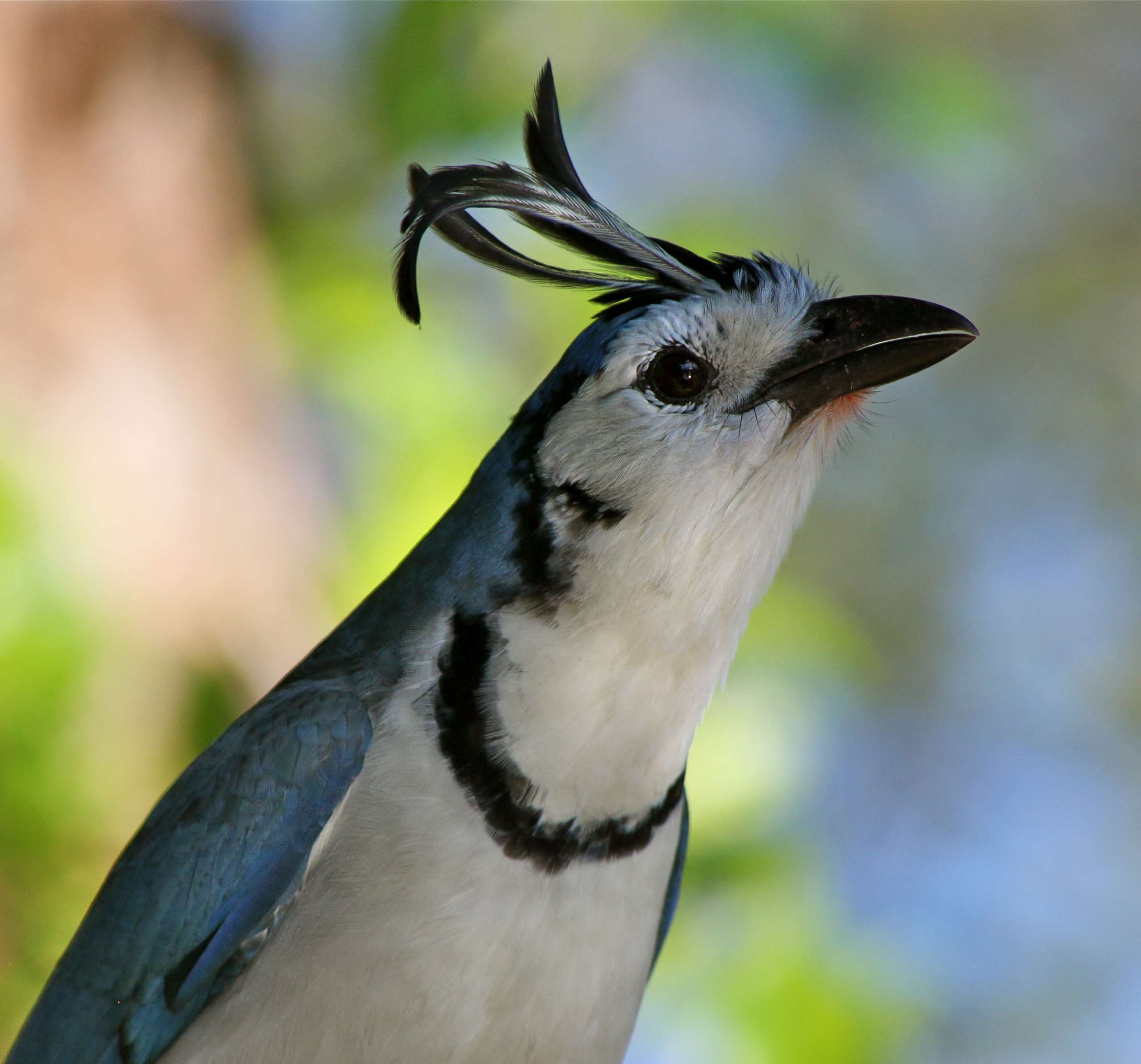
Upper body

The white-throated magpie-jay is between 43 and 56 cm (17–22 in) in length and weighs 205 to 213 g (7.2–7.5 oz). The species has a particularly long tail and a slightly curved crest of feathers on the head. The crest is black in the nominate race, but has blue or white margins on the other two subspecies. The nominate race has a white face with a black crown and margin to the face, forming a narrow band around the throat, as well as a small drop below the eye. The black is less extensive in the other subspecies. The breast, belly and underside of the rump are white, and the wings, mantle and tail are blue (with whitish margins on the tail). The legs and eye are black, and the bill is grey. The plumage of the females is mostly as that of the male but duller on the top, with a narrower band across the chest, and the tail is shorter.

== Distribution and habitat ==
The white-throated magpie-jay is associated with a wide range of habitats from arid environments to semi-humid woodlands, from sea level up to 1,250 m (4,100 ft), although only occasionally higher than 800 m (2,600 ft). It occurs rarely in columnar cacti forest, but is common in thorn forest, gallery forest, deciduous woodland, forest edges and cultivated areas like coffee plantations. The species does not undertake any migratory movements, although males disperse away from their natal territories a few years after fledging. It is a common species across its range, and is not considered threatened by human activities.

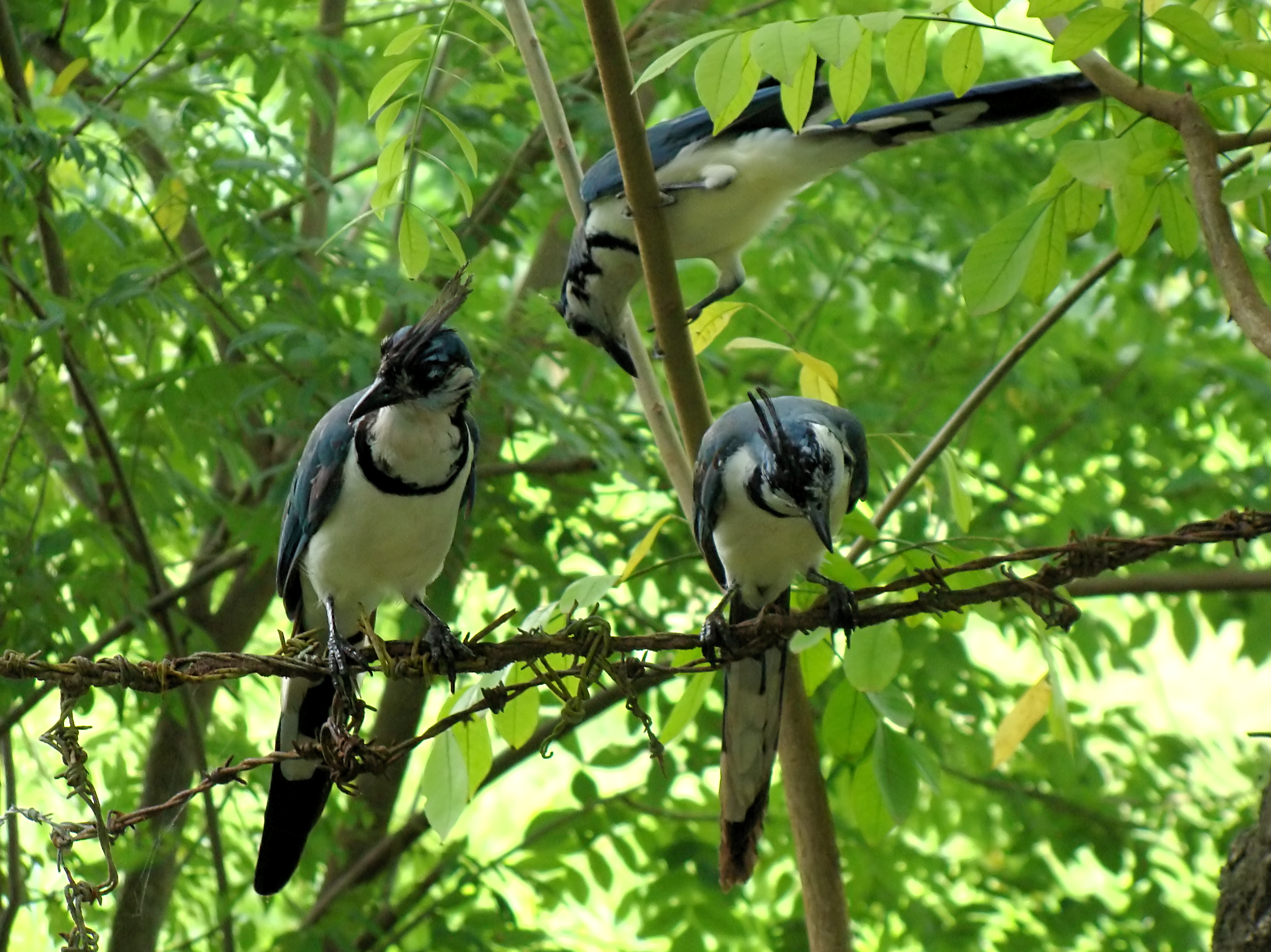
White-throated magpie-jay at Nicoya Peninsula, Costa Rica

== Behaviour ==
White-throated magpie-jays are omnivorous, consuming a wide range of animal and plant matter. Items included in the diet include invertebrates such as insects and caterpillars, frogs, lizards, eggs and nestlings of other birds, seeds, fruits, grain, and nectar from Balsa blossoms. Younger birds take several years to acquire the full range of foraging skills of their parents.
