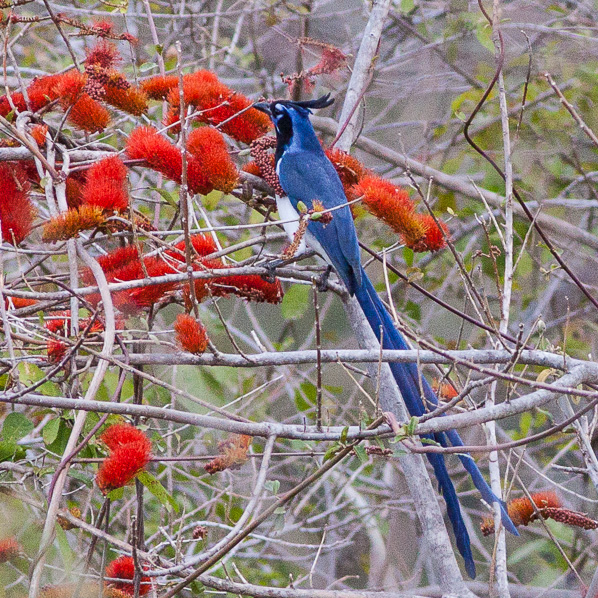

Conservation status
- Least Concern (IUCN 3.1)

Scientific classification
- Kingdom: Animalia
- Phylum: Chordata
- Class: Aves
- Order: Passeriformes
- Family: Corvidae
- Genus: Cyanocorax
- Species: C. colliei

Binomial name
- Cyanocorax colliei (Vigors, 1829)

Synonyms
- Calocitta elegans Finsch, 1871; Corvus bellockii; Cyanocorax colliei

= Black-throated magpie-jay =

Species of bird

The black-throated magpie-jay (Cyanocorax colliei) is a strikingly long-tailed magpie-jay of northwestern Mexico.

== Taxonomy ==
The black-throated magpie-jay was formally described in 1829 by the Irish zoologist Nicholas Aylward Vigors from a specimen collected at San Blas, Nayarit, Mexico. The specimen had been obtained by members of an expedition to explore the western coast of North America captained by Frederick William Beechey on HMS Blossom. Vigors coined the binomial name Pica colleriei, with the specific epithet chosen to honour Alexander Collie, the surgeon on board the Blossom, who had presented the specimen to the Zoological Society of London. The black-throated magpie-jay and the white-throated magpie-jay were formerly placed in their own genus Calocitta. When molecular phylogenetic studies found that the genus Cyanocorax was paraphyletic relative to Calocitta, the two species were subsumed into Cyanocorax to resolve the paraphyly. The species is monotypic: no subspecies are recognised.

The black-throated magpie-jay hybridizes in Jalisco with the white-throated magpie jay (C. formosus), with which it forms a superspecies.

== Description ==
This species is 58.5 to 76.5 cm (23.0 to 30.1 in) long, more than half of which is the tail, and weight is 225–251 g (7.9–8.9 oz). Only a very few corvids, including the black-billed magpie, the red-billed blue magpie and the closely related white-throated magpie-jay, have a comparable tail length. The upperparts are blue with white tips to the tail feathers; the underparts are white. The bill, legs, head, and conspicuous crest are black except for a pale blue crescent over the eyes and a patch under the eye. In juveniles, the crest has a white tip and the patch below the eye is smaller and darker blue than in adults. In most birds, the throat and chest are also black, but some in the southern part of the range have various amounts of white there.

The calls are varied, loud, raucous, sometimes parrot-like.

== Distribution and habitat ==
This species occurs in pairs or small groups in woodland, except for humid woodland, and partially open areas on the Pacific Slope of Mexico from southern Sonora south to Jalisco and northwestern Colima, for a total of 160,000 km^{2} (62,000 sq mi). As of 1993 there was some evidence of a population decline.

The species has become established in southern San Diego County (2013), especially in the Tijuana River Valley. The birds are presumably descendants of escapees from nearby Tijuana, Baja California, where the trade in birds is unregulated.

== Behavior ==
The black-throated magpie-jay's diet is omnivorous, typical of the crow family.

The nest is also typical of the family: a big cup of sticks lined with softer material. The female lays 3 to 7 whitish eggs with brown and gray spots.
