= National Route 903 (Costa Rica) =

National Road Route in Costa Rica

National Tertiary Route 903
- Ruta nacional terciaria 903

Route information
- Maintained by Ministry of Public Works and Transport
- Length: 29.340 km (18.231 mi)

Location
- Country: Costa Rica
- Provinces: Guanacaste

Highway system
- National Road Network of Costa Rica
← Route 902	→ Route 904

National Tertiary Route 903, or just Route 903 (Spanish: Ruta Nacional Terciaria 903, or Ruta 903) is a National Road Route of Costa Rica, located in the Guanacaste province.

== Description ==
In Guanacaste province the route covers Nandayure canton (Carmona, Porvenir, and Bejuco districts).
