= National Route 901 (Costa Rica) =

National Road Route in Costa Rica

National Tertiary Route 901
- Ruta nacional terciaria 901

Route information
- Maintained by Ministry of Public Works and Transport
- Length: 23.845 km (14.817 mi)

Location
- Country: Costa Rica
- Provinces: Guanacaste

Highway system
- National Road Network of Costa Rica
← Route 817	→ Route 902

National Tertiary Route 901, or just Route 901 (Spanish: Ruta Nacional Terciaria 901, or Ruta 901) is a National Road Route of Costa Rica, located in the Guanacaste province.

== Description ==
In Guanacaste province the route covers Nandayure canton (Zapotal district) and Hojancha canton (Puerto Carrillo district).
