= National Route 163 (Costa Rica) =

National Road Route in Costa Rica

National Secondary Route 163
- Ruta nacional secundaria 163

Route information
- Maintained by Ministry of Public Works and Transport
- Length: 35.675 km (22.167 mi)

Location
- Country: Costa Rica
- Provinces: Guanacaste, Puntarenas

Highway system
- National Road Network of Costa Rica
← Route 161	→ Route 164

National Secondary Route 163, or just Route 163 (Spanish: Ruta Nacional Secundaria 163, or Ruta 163) is a National Road Route of Costa Rica located in the Guanacaste and Puntarenas provinces.

== Description ==
In Guanacaste province the route covers Nandayure canton (Bejuco district).

In Puntarenas province the route covers Puntarenas canton (Lepanto district).
