= National Route 624 (Costa Rica) =

National Road Route in Costa Rica

National Tertiary Route 624
- Ruta nacional terciaria 624

Route information
- Maintained by Ministry of Public Works and Transport
- Length: 6.595 km (4.098 mi)

Location
- Country: Costa Rica
- Provinces: Puntarenas

Highway system
- National Road Network of Costa Rica
← Route 623	→ Route 625

National Tertiary Route 624, or just Route 624 (Spanish: Ruta Nacional Terciaria 624, or Ruta 624) is a National Road Route of Costa Rica, located in the Puntarenas province.

== Description ==
In Puntarenas province the route covers Puntarenas canton (Cóbano district).
