= Santa Rita District, Nandayure =

District in Nandayure canton, Guanacaste province, Costa Rica

Santa Rita
- District
- Santa Rita district
- Santa Rita district location in Costa Rica
- Coordinates: 10.03929°N 85.2822116°W
- Country: Costa Rica
- Province: Guanacaste
- Canton: Nandayure

Area
  - Total: 51.32 km^{2} (19.81 sq mi)
- Elevation: 52 m (171 ft)

Population (2011)
  - Total: 1,446
  - Density: 28.18/km^{2} (72.98/sq mi)
- Time zone: UTC−06:00
- Postal code: 50902

Santa Rita is a district of the Nandayure canton, in the Guanacaste province of Costa Rica.

== Geography ==
Santa Rita has an area of 51.32 km^{2} (19.81 sq mi) and an elevation of 52 metres.

== Villages ==
Administrative center of the district is the village of Santa Rita.

Other villages in the district are Angostura, Cacao, Chumico, Guaria, Guastomatal, Morote, Tacanis, Uvita (partly), Hierbabuena (partly).

== Demographics ==
Historical population
| Census | Pop. | ±% p.a. |
|---|---|---|
| 1963 | 1,747 | — |
| 1973 | 1,858 | +0.62% |
| 1984 | 1,423 | −2.40% |
| 2000 | 1,489 | +0.28% |
| 2011 | 1,446 | −0.27% |
| 2022 | 1,787 | +1.94% |
Source: Instituto Nacional de Estadística y Censos; Centro Centroamericano de Población

For the 2011 census, Santa Rita had a population of 1,446 inhabitants.

== Transportation ==
=== Road transportation ===
The district is covered by the following road routes:

- National Route 21
- National Route 161
