= Tambor, Costa Rica =

Tambor
- Community
- Tambor
- Coordinates: 9°44′3″N 85°0′42″W
- Country: Costa Rica
- Province: Puntarenas
- Canton: Puntarenas
- District: Cobano

Area
  - Total: 7.74 km^{2} (2.99 sq mi)
- Time zone: UTC−6 (Central (CST))
  - Summer (DST): UTC−5 (CDT)

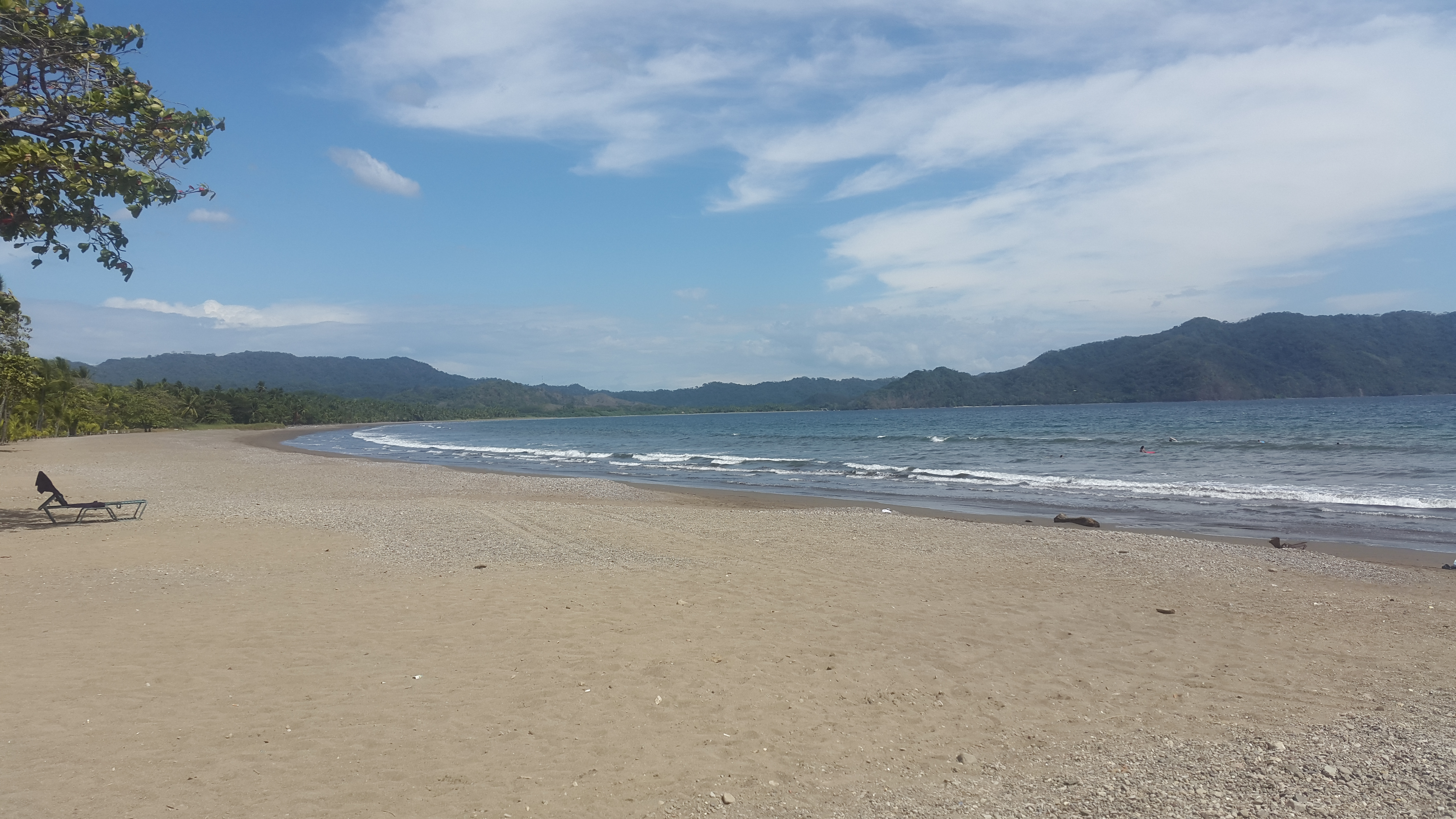

Tambor is a town in Costa Rica.

== Geography ==
Tambor is located in the portion of the Nicoya Peninsula that is located in the Province of Puntarenas. Within that province it is located in the cantón of the same name in the district of Cóbano. Tambor is located on the Panica River, which flows from Bahia Ballena.

== History ==
The town started out as a small fishing village but now tourism has greatly superseded that as the primary economic activity.

== Tourism ==
=== Resorts ===
Due to the beauty of Bahia Ballena, Tambor has an abundance of resorts and villages nearby it. Some of these are

- Barcelo Tambor
- Los Delphines Gated Community
- Tambor Tropical Beach Resort
- El Arbol De Dios
- Bahia Tambor

== Transport ==
Tambor Airport, a domestic airport with scheduled service to and from San José is located here.
