= National Route 21 (Costa Rica) =

National Road Route in Costa Rica

National Primary Route 21
- Ruta nacional primaria 21
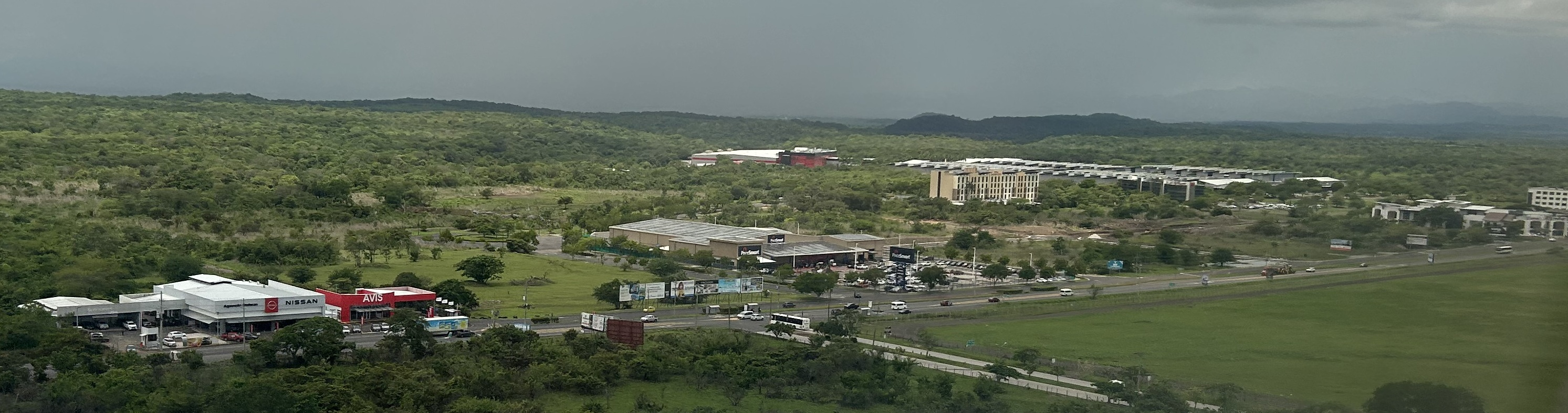
- Route 21 near the Guanacaste Airport

Route information
- Maintained by Ministry of Public Works and Transport
- Length: 145.535 km (90.431 mi)

Location
- Country: Costa Rica
- Provinces: Guanacaste, Puntarenas

Highway system
- National Road Network of Costa Rica
← Route 18	→ Route 22

National Primary Route 21, or just Route 21 (Spanish: Ruta Nacional Primaria 21, or Ruta 21) is a National Road Route of Costa Rica, located in the Guanacaste, Puntarenas provinces.

== Description ==
In Guanacaste province the route covers Liberia canton (Liberia and Nacascolo districts), Nicoya canton (Nicoya and Mansión districts), Santa Cruz canton (Santa Cruz and Diriá districts), Carrillo canton (Filadelfia, Palmira, and Belén districts), Nandayure canton (Santa Rita and San Pablo districts).

In Puntarenas province the route covers Puntarenas canton (Lepanto and Paquera districts).
