= Montezuma, Costa Rica =

Montezuma
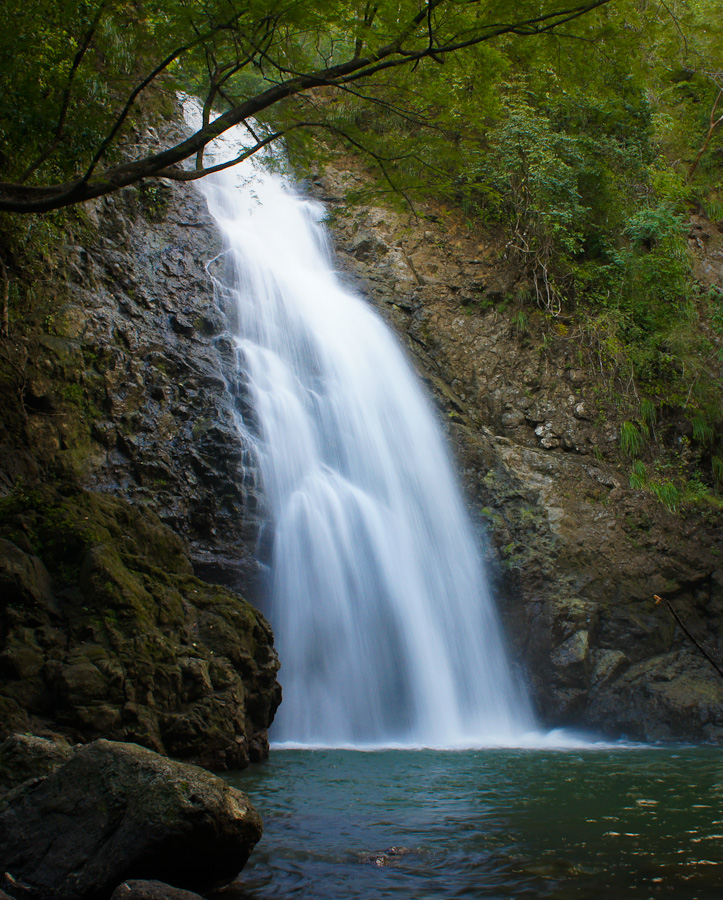
- Montezuma Falls

- Location in Costa Rica
- Coordinates: 9°39′N 85°04′W
- Country: Costa Rica
- Province: Puntarenas
- Time zone: UTC-6
- Area code: +506

Montezuma is a town in Puntarenas Province, Costa Rica which began as a remote fishing village and has gained popularity since the 1980s among tourists on a budget.

Montezuma is located near the southern tip of the Nicoya Peninsula, 41 km (25 mi) southwest of Paquera and 8 km (5 mi) south of the town of Cóbano. Most services are in Cóbano. The nearest airport is located in Tambor.

The town features a mix of residents and foreign backpackers and eco-tourists who come for the beaches, rivers, and scenic waterfalls surrounding the village. The nearby Cabo Blanco Nature Reserve draws a large number of visitors to the area.

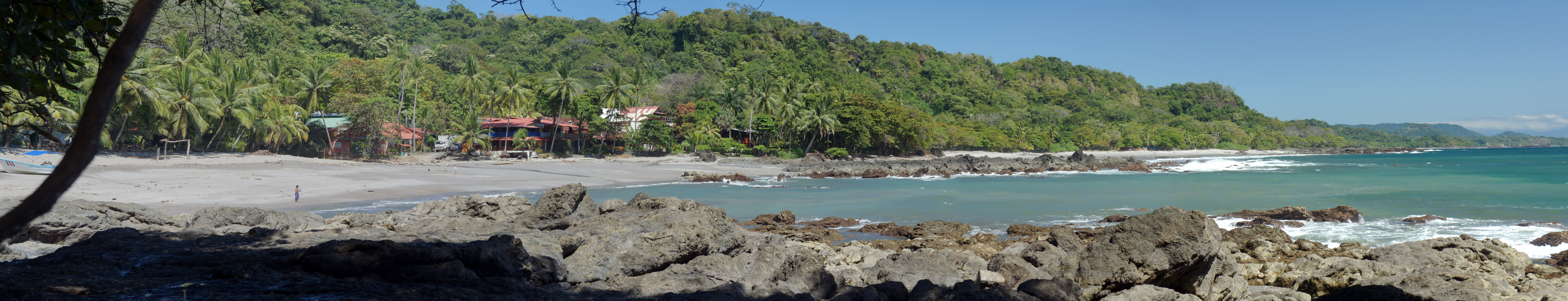
Beachfront panorama of the town of Montezuma, Costa Rica, on the southern tip of the Nicoya Peninsula.
