= Cabo Blanco Absolute Natural Reserve =

Nature Reserve of Costa Rica

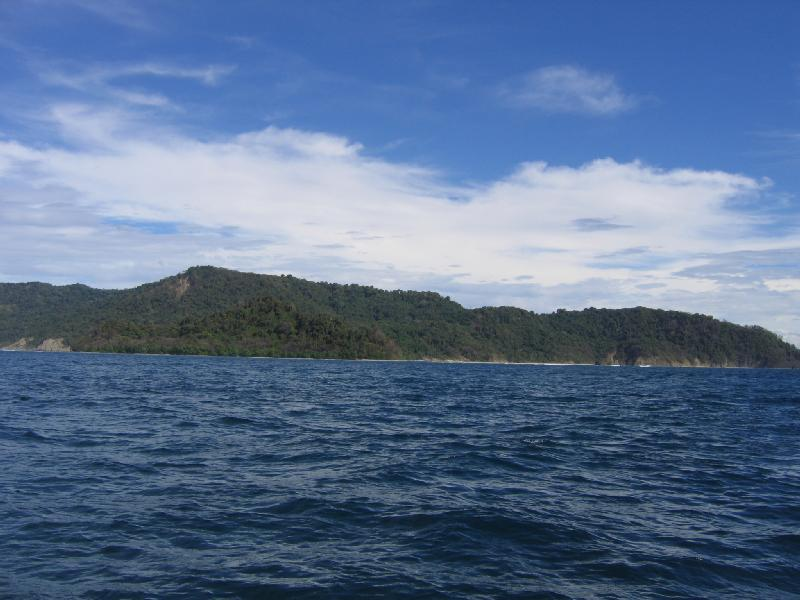

- Location within Costa Rica
- Location: Puntarenas, Costa Rica
- Nearest city: Mal Pais
- Coordinates: 9°33′29″N 85°06′40″W
- Area: 3,140 acres (12.7 km^{2}) terrestrial 4,420 acres (1,790 ha) marine
- Established: 1963
- Governing body: National System of Conservation Areas (SINAC)

The Cabo Blanco Absolute Natural Reserve is a Nature Reserve of Costa Rica, part of the Tempisque Conservation Area in the province of Puntarenas, covering an area of 3,140 acres (12.7 km^{2}) terrestrial and 4,420 acres (17.9 km^{2}) marine on the southern tip of the Nicoya Peninsula near Montezuma-Cabuya and Mal Pais.

The site is home to the San Miguel Biological Station which was developed to promote and support teaching, research, and environmental education and has facilities that include classrooms, laboratories and a reference library. The reserve was created in 1963 due to a campaign started by Nils Olof Wessberg and was the first major conservation project in the country.

== History ==
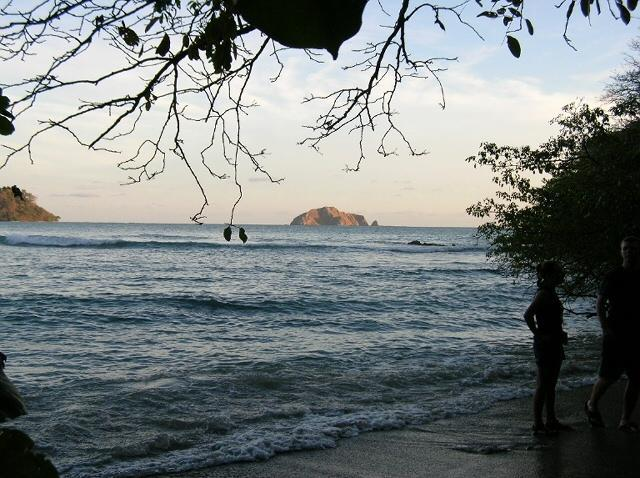

Up to the 1960s the lands that now constitute the Cabo Blanco Nature Reserve were being depleted of their natural forests for use as farm and pasture land. The emphasis in those days was to develop and increase agricultural production and cattle, and little concern was given to conservation of natural habitats.

Nils Olof Wessberg (known as Nicolás) and Karen Mogensen arrived in Costa Rica 1955 in the pursuit of Karen's dream of finding happiness in harmony with nature. They chose to establish themselves in the Nicoya Peninsula.

Soon after establishing themselves in a farm near the Montezuma area, Nicolás set up on an expedition to the Cabo Blanco area in search for native tree seeds to reforest their newly acquired farm. Upon arriving to the area, he was amazed at the abundant wildlife and the size of the trees in the area. This was like an oasis in the midst of a desert as all lands around had been devastated to give way to low-yield pasture and agricultural lands.

This experience was what triggered their determination to save and preserve this "natural jewel". With the aid of international conservation societies, they bought 1,250 hectares (3,100 acres) of land in 1963 and turned these lands into the first protected area in all of Costa Rica.

Nicolas was murdered in 1975 while he was campaigning to protect Osa Peninsula from depletion by hunting, forest and gold exploitation. Karen died in 1994. Their bodies are buried at the Nicolas Wessberg Natural Reserve which was the original farm they bought when first arrived in the Montezuma area.

== Flora ==
About 140 different species of trees have been identified inside the park. Because the park is located in a transition area between the dry and wet forest, a unique combination of evergreen trees (never lose their leaves) which are characteristic of the humid rainforest, and trees of the deciduous type (which lose their foliage during the dry season) and are characteristic of the dry forest.

Among the dry forest specimens found we can mention the "Pochote" (Bombacopsis quinata), the "Guacimo" (Guazuma ulmifolia), and the "Indio Desnudo" (Bursera simaruba) but there are many other trees present that are native to the whole Nicoya Peninsula area.

Among the evergreens is worth mentioning the tall and impressive "Espavel" (Anacardium excelsum), the "Guacimo Colorado" (Luehea seemanii), and the beautiful "Cortez Amarillo" (Tabebuia ochracea) which bursts into a yellow spectacle of flowers during the dry months of March and April.

== Fauna ==
There is a considerable variety of mammals in the park. Predominant among these and very easily spotted by visitors are the howler (Alouatta palliata) and the white-face (Cebus capuchinus) monkeys.

Also very abundant and easily seen are the white-nosed coati (Nasua narica) and the white-tailed deer (Odocoileus virginianus). Also present, but harder to spot are the margay (Felis wiedii) and the coyote (Canis latrans).

But the greatest wealth in fauna is in the abundant marine birds, marine mammals including orcas, fish, crabs and mollusks found in the shore waters and in the Cabo Blanco island. Worth mentioning is the healthy population of brown boobies and pelicans found in the island, and also the plentiful conch (Strombus galeatus) found on the park's waters.
