= Inter-American Highway =

Mexican and Central American section of the Pan-American Highway

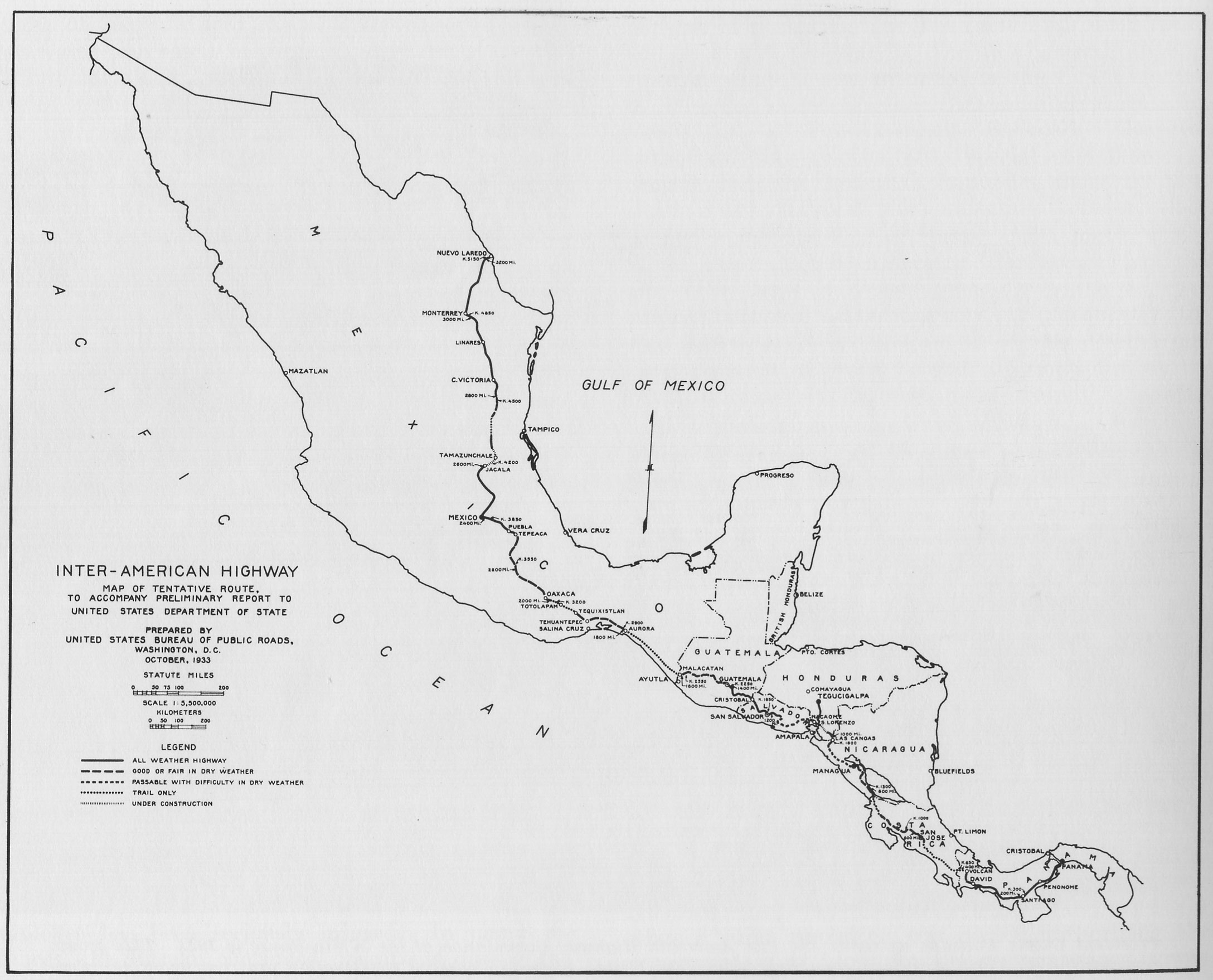
Scheme of the Inter-American Highway from 1933.

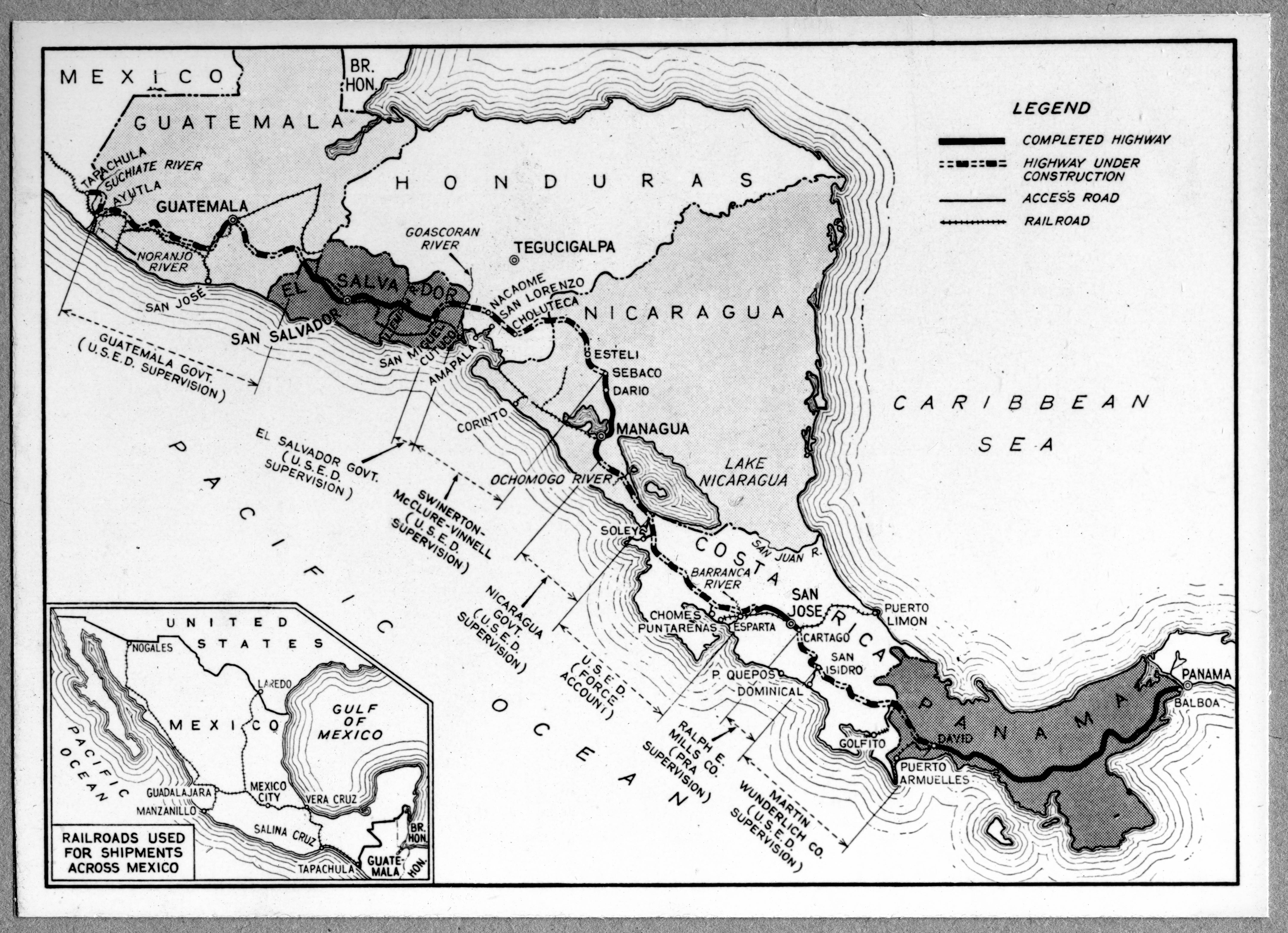
Map of highway progress in 1940s

The Inter-American Highway (IAH) is the Central American section of the Pan-American Highway and spans 5,470 kilometers (3,400 mi) between Nuevo Laredo, Mexico, and Panama City, Panama.

== History ==
The idea of a road being built across all of Central America became a tangible goal in 1923 as the United States began conducting aerial surveys using the United States Army new photo reconnaissance and photographic aerial mapping technology. However, the aerial mapping effort was not directly tied to the upcoming Inter-American Highway project and was conducted with the cooperation of several of the Central American republics.

By 1940, the United States had a strong presence in Central America, especially in Panama. The American-owned and operated both the Panama Canal and the Panama Railroad, but with the looming war in Europe, the United States felt it necessary to establish a more direct connection with Panama. Therefore, the United States and Panamanian governments agreed to begin the construction of a trans-isthmian highway located outside of the Canal Zone. Thus, the construction of the actual Inter-American Highway was instigated by the United States as a safety precaution at the beginning of World War II.

As with the Panama Canal project, the principal engineers and administrators of the highway construction were supplied by the United States. For those stationed in larger cities, their families were allowed to come and stay with them as an incentive to keep them from returning to the United States.

Many pieces of what is now the Inter-American Highway were constructed independently by individual countries prior to 1940. However, these roads only existed between large cities and were not in very good condition. Unlike in the United States, transportation in Central America had progressed rapidly from ox-cart paths to air transport creating numerous gaps in the ground transportation network. One of the greatest challenges faced by the workers was bridging these gaps.

Progress on the IAH was painstakingly slow due to the isolation of the building sites and frequent natural obstacles such as mountains and rivers. Nonetheless, construction on the IAH was hastened as the threat of the German U-boats in the Atlantic and Caribbean increased. As part of the American war effort, the United States Army Corps of Engineers began the construction of a "Military Road" in conjunction with the IAH. This group of engineers was allowed access to all the Central American nations involved in the original highway project due to the war emergency status of the Military Road.

The construction of both the IAH and the auxiliary military road progressed at a breakneck speed, and construction supplies quickly ran out. The scarcity of construction material only served to augment local unease concerning the project since local merchants had no precedence over imported materials from the United States or shipping rights, and therefore made little profit from the whole affair. Although construction did not directly benefit local business, it did provide employment of many of the local people. However, this positive impact only lasted as long as the construction team was in an area. For example, after the German submarine threat subsided - due to the presence of the United States Navy - the Corps of Engineers ceased construction on the Military Road project, suddenly leaving many people unemployed and upset.

After the American engineers left Central America, IAH construction started back up at full steam, having inherited a significant amount of supplies and equipment from the abandoned military project. By 1946, the IAH was ready for inspection by American diplomats and engineers, but was far from being finished. Most of the road was only passable by Jeep, but the basic road outline had been carved out of the surrounding jungle and mountains. The road was finally finished in 1967 and existed as a continuous strip of gravel, dirt, or asphalt between Panama and Mexico. The only section of the IAH that was constructed without any form of American aid was the 1,600 mile strip between Nuevo Laredo and Malacatán, on the Mexico-Guatemala border.

== See also ==
- El Salvador during World War II
- Panama during World War II
- Latin America during World War II
- American Theater (1939-1945)
