= Nandayure (canton) =

Canton in Guanacaste province, Costa Rica

- Canton
- Flag
- Nandayure canton
- Nandayure canton location in Costa Rica
- Coordinates: 9.9014254°N 85.3036154°W
- Country: Costa Rica
- Province: Guanacaste
- Creation: 9 October 1961
- Head city: Carmona
- Districts: Districts: Carmona; Santa Rita; Zapotal; San Pablo; Porvenir; Bejuco

Government
  - Type: Municipality
  - Body: Municipalidad de Nandayure

Area
  - Total: 565.59 km^{2} (218.38 sq mi)
- Elevation: 215 m (705 ft)

Population (2011)
  - Total: 11,121
  - Density: 19.663/km^{2} (50.926/sq mi)
- Time zone: UTC−06:00
- Canton code: 509
- Website: www.nandayure.go.cr

Nandayure is a canton in the Guanacaste province of Costa Rica. The head city is in Carmona district.

== History ==
Nandayure was created on 9 October 1961 by decree 2826.

On September 5, 2012, Nandayure was struck by a magnitude 7.6 earthquake, destroying houses in the canton.

== Geography ==
Nandayure has an area of 565.59 km^{2} (218.38 sq mi) and a mean elevation of 215 metres.

The canton encompasses a piece of the coastline of the Gulf of Nicoya near the mouth of the Tempisque River, including Berrugate Island. It cuts across the center of the Nicoya Peninsula to the Pacific coast between the Ora River to the north and the Bongo River to the south.

== Districts ==
The canton of Nandayure is subdivided into the following districts:

1. Carmona
2. Santa Rita
3. Zapotal
4. San Pablo
5. Porvenir
6. Bejuco

== Demographics ==
Historical population
Census	Pop.	±% p.a.
1963	12,038	—
1973	12,058	+0.02%
1984	9,604	−2.05%
2000	9,985	+0.24%
2011	11,121	+0.98%
2022	11,874	+0.60%
Source: Instituto Nacional de Estadística y Censos; Centro Centroamericano de Población

For the 2011 census, Nandayure had a population of 11,121 inhabitants.

== Transportation ==
=== Road transportation ===
The canton is covered by the following road routes:

- National Route 21
- National Route 160
- National Route 161
- National Route 163
- National Route 623
- National Route 901
- National Route 902
- National Route 903
- National Route 915
