= Partido de Nicoya =

Coordinates: 9°55′N 84°09′W

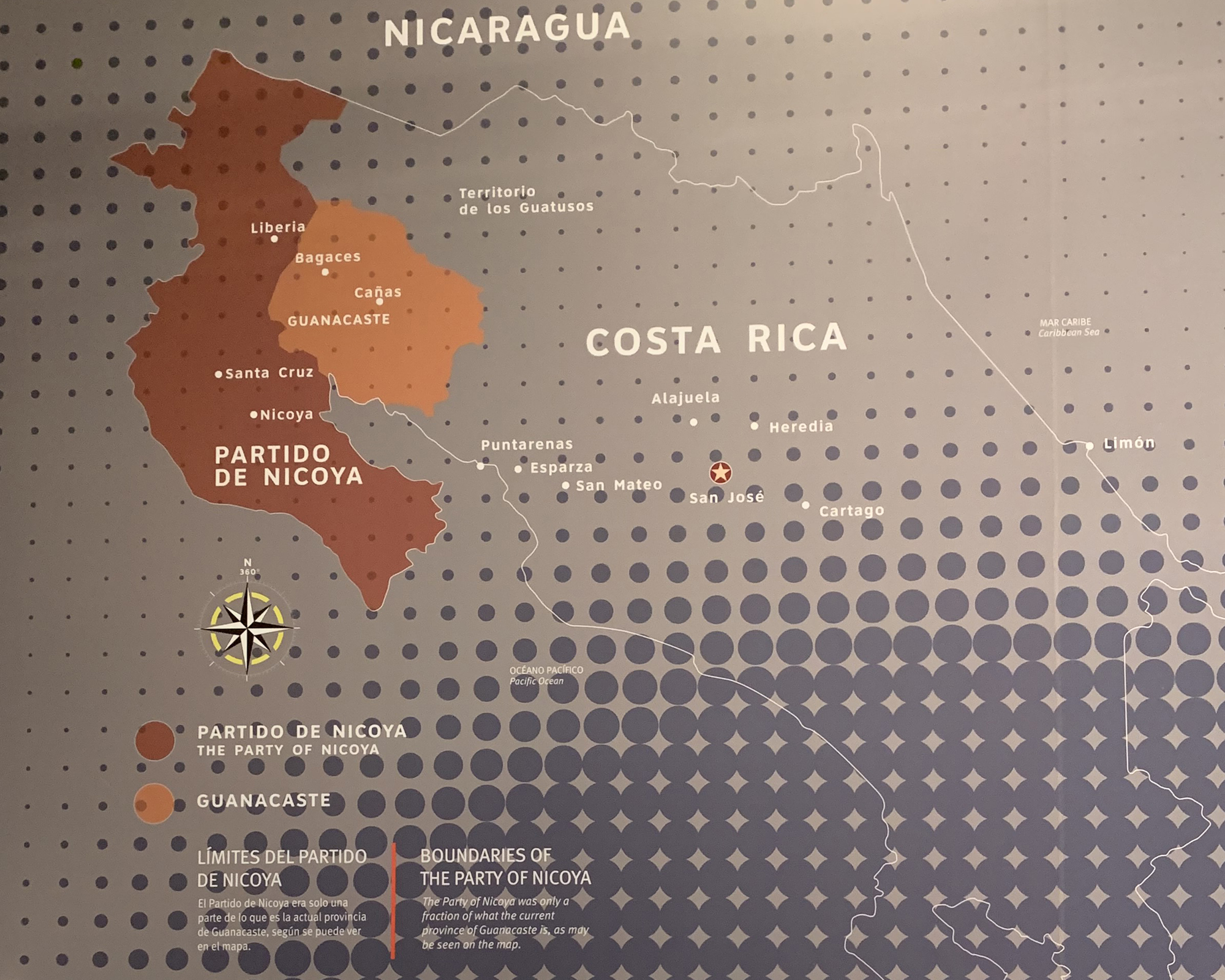
Map of the Partido de Nicoya and Guanacaste before the annexation to Costa Rica.

The Partido de Nicoya (1787-1826) was a political-administrative Spanish colonial region that made up most of what is now the Guanacaste province in Costa Rica.

Originally the territory was bounded on the northeast by the La Flor river and Lake Cocibolca, or Lake Nicaragua, on the south by Costa Rica (Gulf of Nicoya, Tempisque River, Salto River), and on the east by a line that joins the northernmost part of the Gulf of Nicoya to the mouth of the San Juan River.

== Etymology ==
The name is thought to derive from the Nahuatl words Nicoa and Necoclau, the latter which seems to mean peninsula; necoc meaning both sides and lau meaning sea.

== History ==
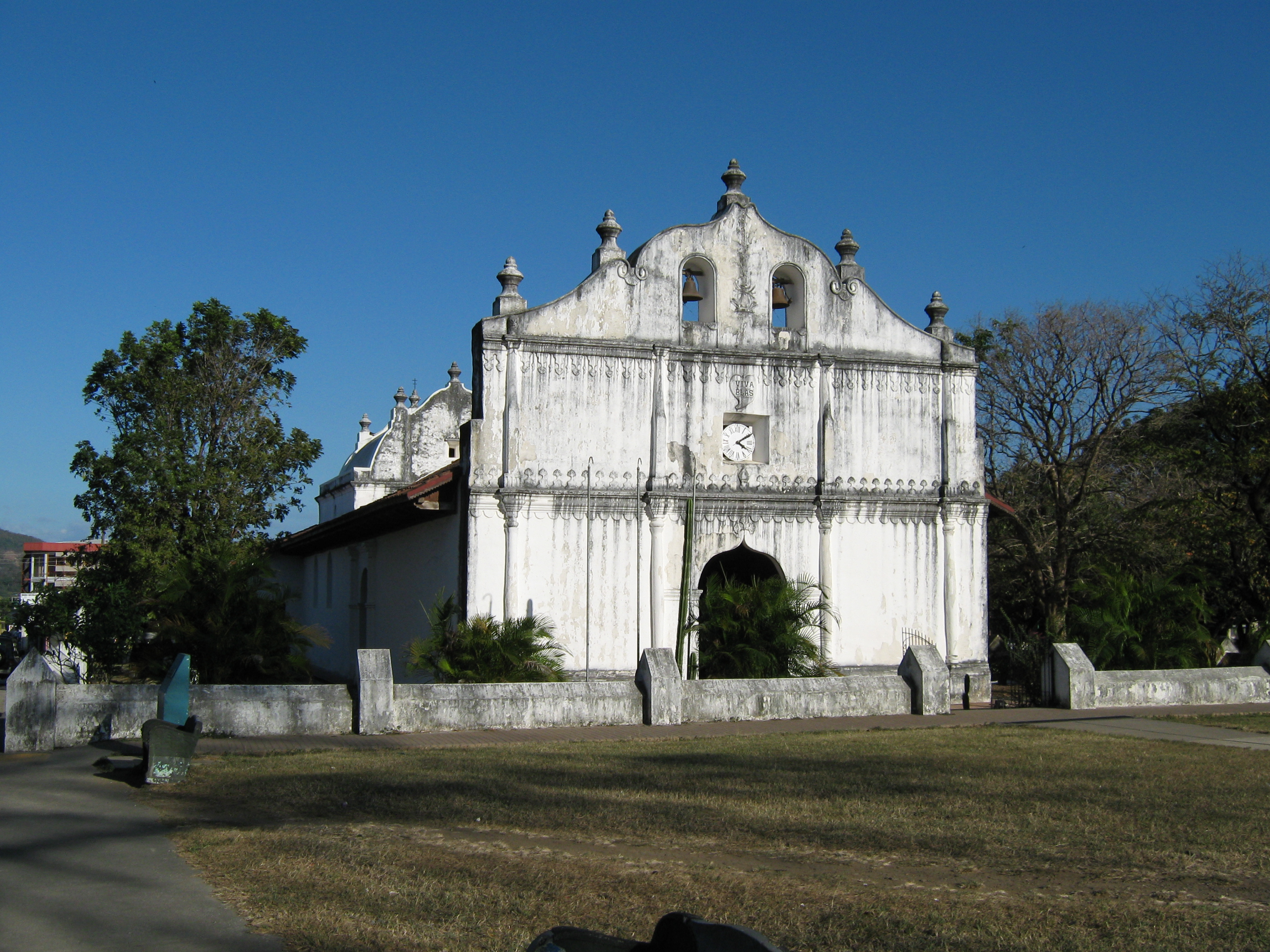
Colonial church of Nicoya

The Nicoya region was organized in 1554 as a Corregimiento or Alcaldía Mayor, under the direct control of the Captaincy General of Guatemala.

In 1787, the Corregimiento was added to the Intendencia of the León of Nicaragua. Nicoya was considered a Subdelegado of the Intendencia, and a subalterno of the Intendente of León. In 1812, the Spanish Constitution divided the territory of the Kingdom of Guatemala into political parts. One of these was the Partido de Nicoya.

In 1820, upon the administrative division of the Province of Nicaragua y Costa Rica, Nicoya became one of its Partidos, ruled by a Jefe Político Subalterno, in turn ruled by the Jefe Político Superior resident in León. In 1821, on the division of Spain and the dissolution of the province of Nicaragua y Costa Rica, the Partido of Nicoya came under the primary authority of the governor of Granada de Nicaragua and then, in 1823, the governor of León.

== Annexation of the Partido of Nicoya ==
The people of Nicoya, in a public event called "cabildo abierto", the equivalent to modern referendums, decided to annex the Partido de Nicoya to the Republic of Costa Rica. On July 25, 1824, Nicoya was formally annexed to Costa Rica. Since then, the coat of arms of Nicoya states the words: "De la patria por nuestra voluntad" which could be translated as "part of the homeland by our own will".

== See also ==
- Nicoya Canton
- Guanacaste Day
