= Malpais, Costa Rica =

Coordinates: 9°39′N 85°04′W

Malpais (9°36'03 N, 85°08'36 W) is a town in Puntarenas Province, Costa Rica which began as a fishing and cattle-farming village, and has become popular among surfers and adventure travelers around the world. in 2006, Forbes Magazine voted the beaches of Malpais and neighboring Santa Teresa as "One of the ten most beautiful in the world."

The town got its name from the fact that all the rivers and streams that flow into the beach in the area dry up in the summer season, making it a "bad land" to try to live in.

Malpais is known for its scenic white-sand coves, rocky outcroppings, steep jungle-covered hills, and forests teeming with animals, birds, and insects.

The area has gained publicity as a result of several famous people buying land and building houses there, including Mel Gibson, Gisele Bündchen, and Bobbie Phillips. In addition, luxury hotels have been built here, along with a variety of restaurants catering to international visitors.

However, the area remains remote and somewhat undeveloped. The dirt roads are pot-holed and become muddy in the rainy season (July–October) and powdery dry in the dry season (November–May). The area is very spread out, and locals' favoured modes of transport are quad bikes and motorcycles.

== Gallery ==
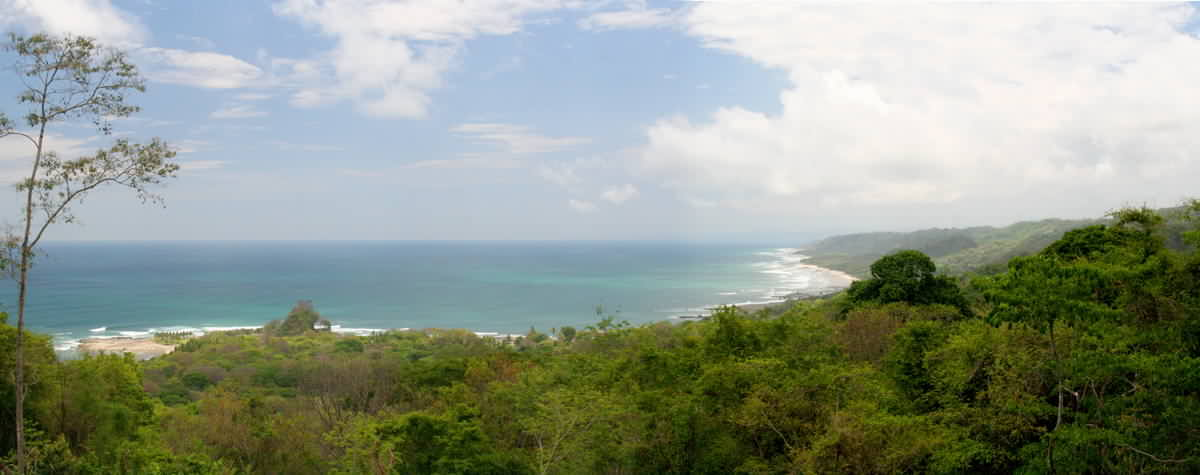
Panoramic Photo of Malpais, Costa Rica

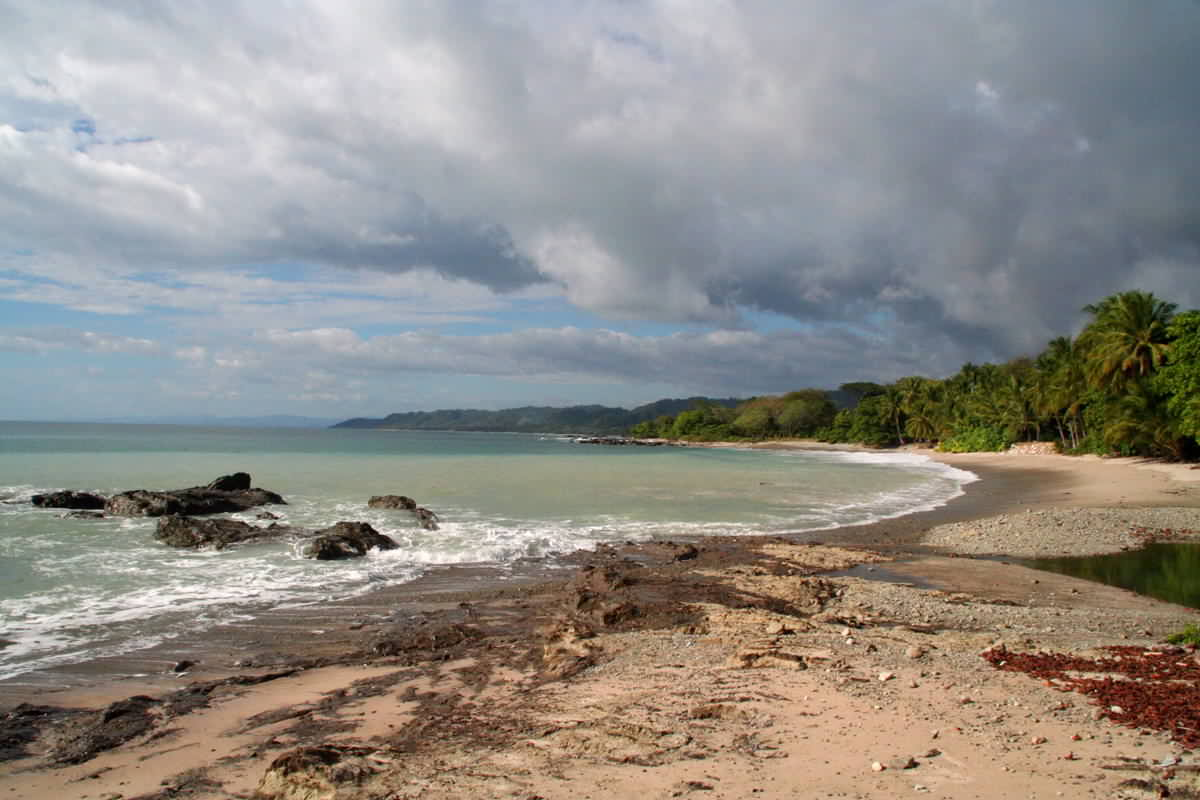
Malpais Beach, just before a storm hits
