= Nicoya Peninsula =

Peninsula of Costa Rica

Native name: Península de Nicoya
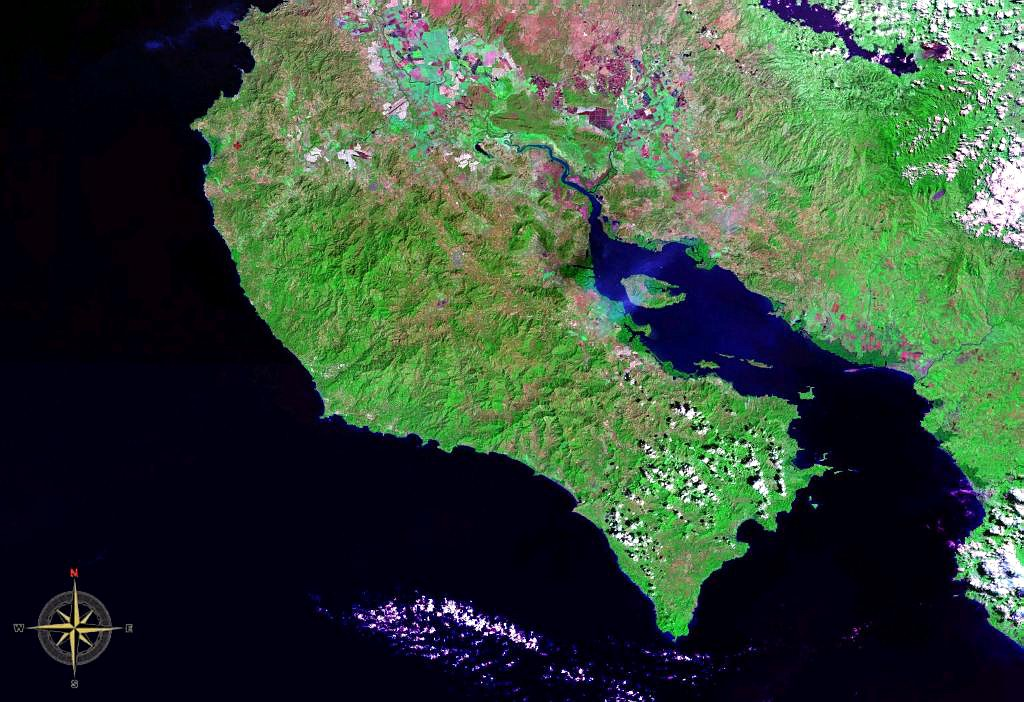
- Satellite view of the Nicoya Peninsula

- Location within Costa Rica
- Interactive map of Nicoya Peninsula

Geography
- Location: Pacific Ocean
- Adjacent to: Gulf of Nicoya
- Area: 5,130 km^{2} (1,980 sq mi)

Administration
- Costa Rica
- Provinces: Guanacaste Province; Puntarenas Province
- Cantons and districts: Nicoya, Santa Cruz, Carrillo, Nandayure, Hojancha (cantons of Guanacaste); Lepanto, Cóbano, and Paquera (districts of Puntarenas)
- Largest settlement: Nicoya

The Nicoya Peninsula (Spanish: Península de Nicoya) is a peninsula on the Pacific coast of Costa Rica. It is divided into two provinces: Guanacaste Province in the north, and the Puntarenas Province in the south. It varies from 30–60 km (19–37 mi) in width and is about 120 km (75 mi) long, forming the largest peninsula in the country. It is known for its beaches and is a popular tourist destination.

The main transport and commercial centre in the region is Nicoya, one of the oldest settlements in Costa Rica. Ferries run between the town of Puntarenas on the mainland and the Nicoya Peninsula. There is an international airport in nearby Liberia and small domestic airstrips in Nosara, Carrillo, Tamarindo, and Tambor.

== Conservation ==
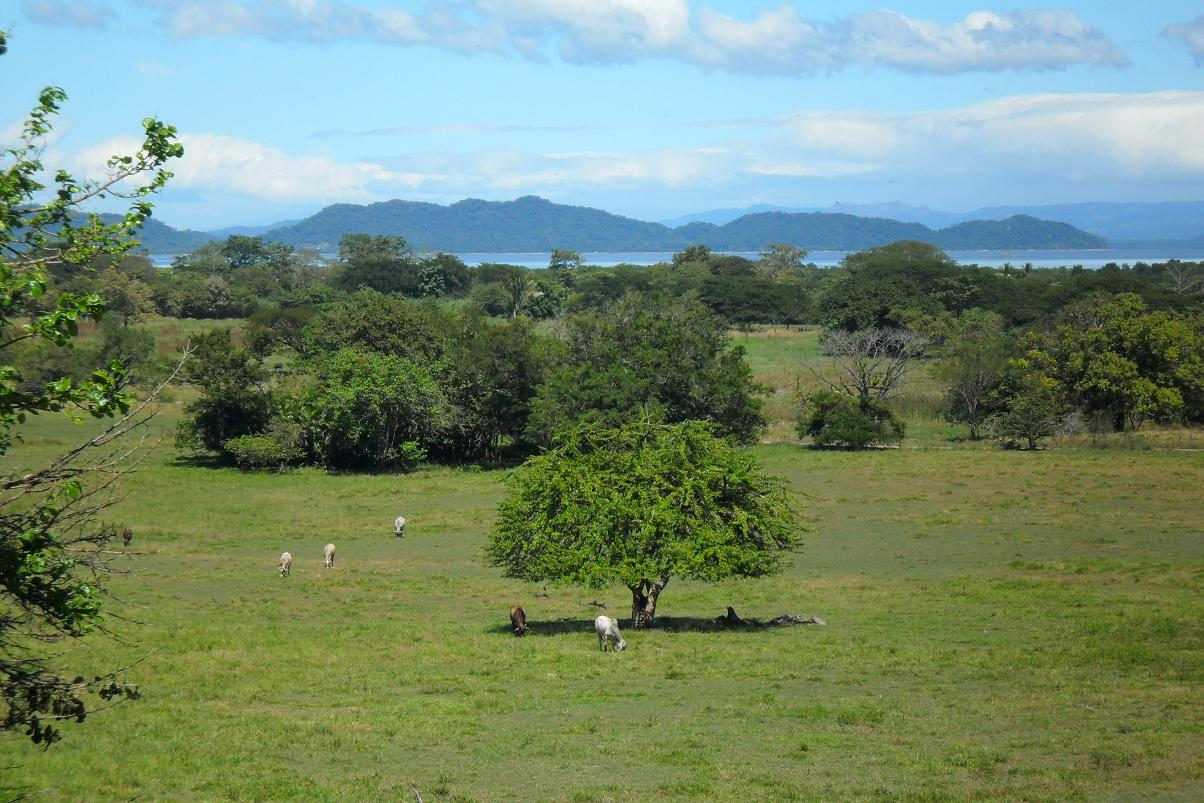
Landscape of the south-east of the peninsula

There are a number of nature reserves and wildlife refuges such as Cabo Blanco, Camaronal, Cueva Murciélago, Curú, La Ceiba, Romelia and the Diriá National Park, as well as the projects on the islands of the adjacent Gulf of Nicoya.

=== Sea turtles ===
The Ostional Wildlife Refuge is the second largest beach where the turtles come to nest. One of their biggest nesting years had over 500,000 females come ashore to nest in one season. This refuge works in with the Nancite beach at Santa Rosa National Park. These two protected areas are two of the most important areas for the nesting of Olive Ridley sea turtles. Two other common species of turtles that nest here are leatherbacks and Pacific green turtles. Nesting generally occurs over three to five days.

=== Birds ===
The peninsula has been designated an Important Bird Area (IBA) by BirdLife International because it supports significant populations of great curassows, lesser ground-cuckoos, Hudsonian whimbrels, Pacific screech-owls, Hoffmann's woodpeckers, orange-fronted parakeets, long-tailed manakins, white-throated magpie-jays and banded wrens.

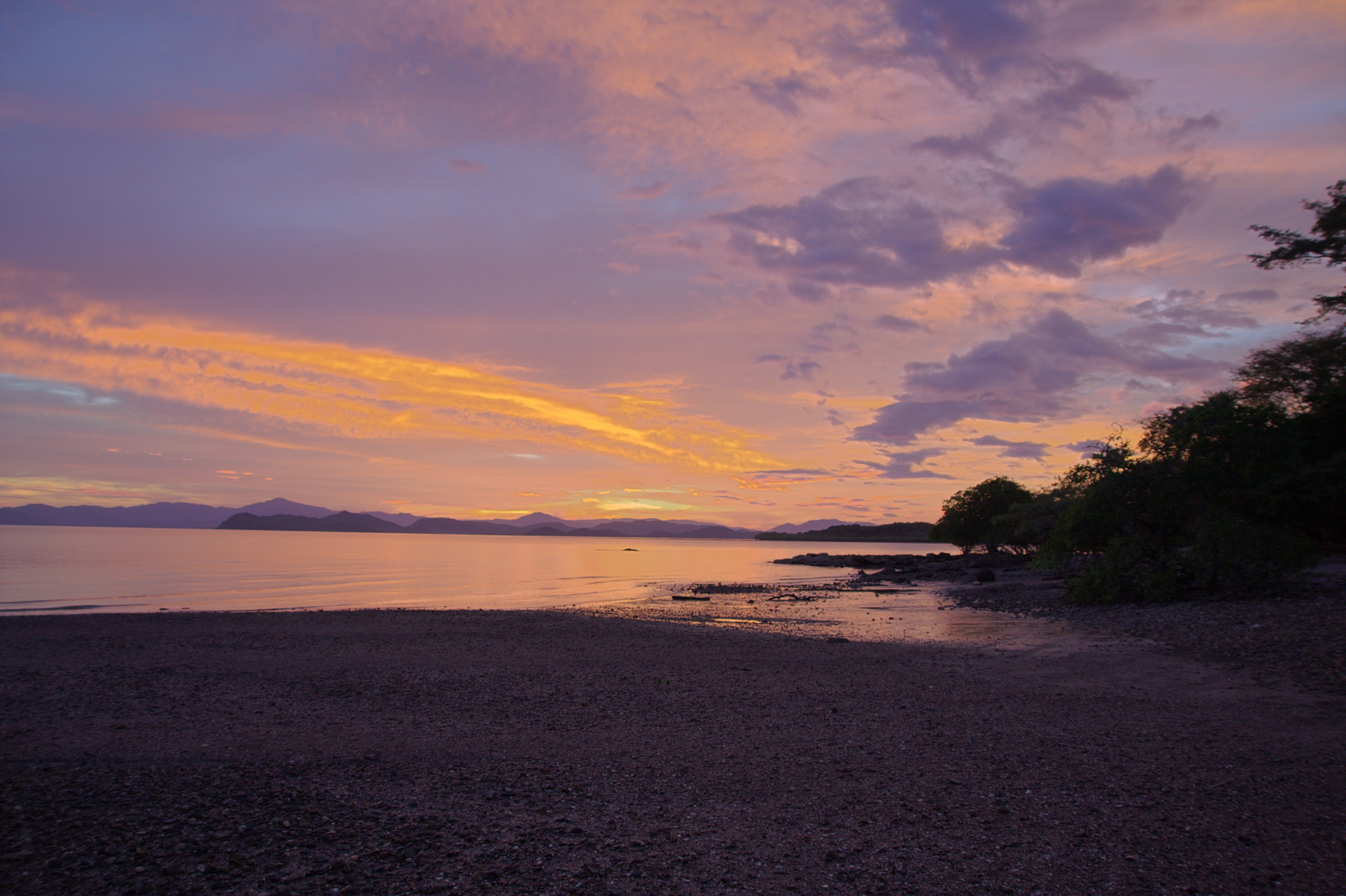
Sunset over the Nicoya Peninsula

== Notable features ==
The Nicoya Peninsula is considered by Quest Network one of the Blue Zones in the world, where people commonly live active lives past the age of 100 years. The region was featured in the book Blue Zones, by Dan Buettner, which focused on the longevity found among Nicoya's residents.

Other notable settlements and places of interest in the area include (going roughly from north to south): Tamarindo, Santa Cruz, Nosara, Sámara, Naranjo, Paquera, Curu, Tambor, Montezuma, Santa Teresa, Mal Pais.

== See also ==
- Tourism in Costa Rica
