= Filadelfia de Guanacaste =

District in Carrillo canton, Guanacaste province, Costa Rica

Filadelfia
- District
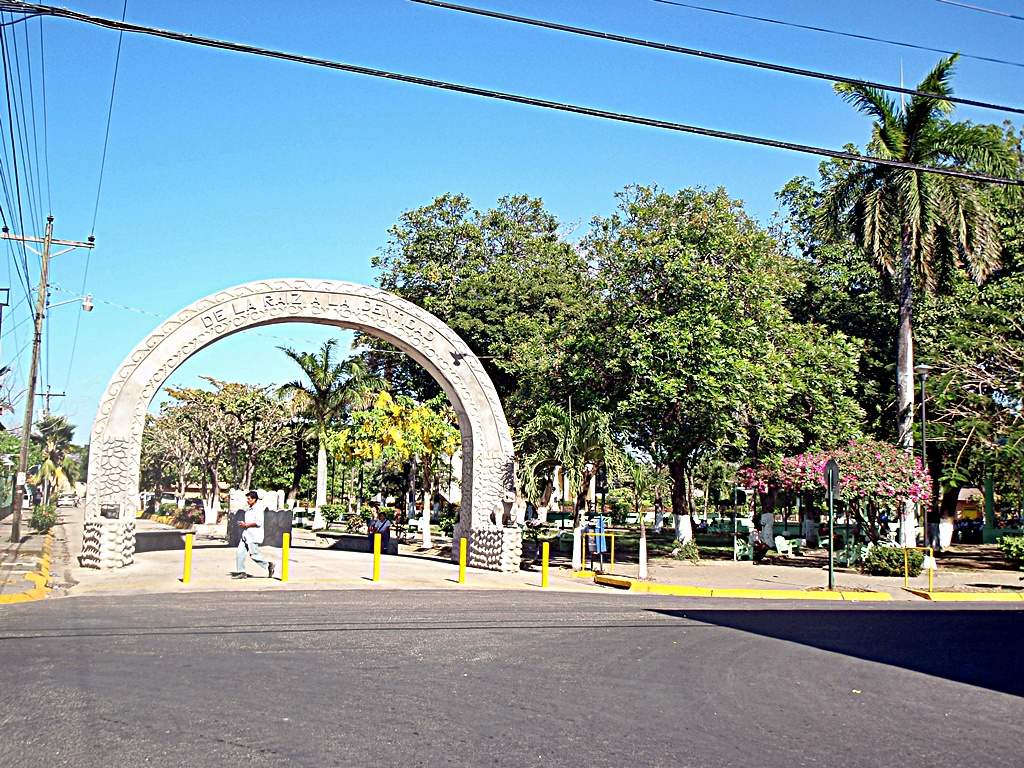
- Central Park of Filadelfia
- Interactive map of Filadelfia
- Filadelfia district location in Costa Rica
- Coordinates: 10.4189826°N 85.4714091°W
- Country: Costa Rica
- Province: Guanacaste
- Canton: Carrillo

Government
  - Syndic: María Auxiliadora Acevedo Bonilla (PLN)
  - Substitute syndic: Rafael Francisco Borge Campos

Area
  - Total: 125.14 km^{2} (48.32 sq mi)
- Elevation: 17 m (56 ft)

Population (2011)
  - Total: 7,953
  - Density: 63.55/km^{2} (164.6/sq mi)
- Time zone: UTC−06:00
- Postal code: 50501

Filadelfia is the first district and main city of Carrillo in Guanacaste, Costa Rica. It was declared an archaeological city because of all the indigenous cemeteries found near the Tempisque River.

== Toponymy ==
The town was formerly known as Siete Cueros (seven leather trees). It was originally named for the abundance of the trees with this name.

== History ==
After the first quarter of the 19th century, Sietecueros neighbors make a petition to the supreme government of Costa Rica, (Braulio Carrillo Colina was the then president), which was to segregate them from the town of Santa Cruz and add them to Guanacaste City, in civil and ecclesiastical aspects. To which took into account the proximity and close relationship with Guanacaste City. This request was approved by Decree 5 Articles 82 of the constitution of the state.

On October 18, 1915, the category of town was granted to Filadelfia. Later, on June 11, 1947, under the administration of Teodoro Picado Michalski, Law No. 864 awarded the town the title of city.

Filadelfia's name was given in 1877 in honor of Filadelfo Soto who was a soldier.

During the episcopate of Bishop Bernardo Augusto Thiel Hoffman, second bishop of Costa Rica in 1894, the parish was erected and dedicated to James son of Zebedee. The church is currently a suffragan of the Diocese of Tilarán.

== Geography ==
Filadelfia has an area of 125.14 km^{2} (48.32 sq mi) and an elevation of 17 metres.

The district borders with Liberia to the north, Santa Cruz and Belén district to the south, Bagaces to the east and Palmira district to the west.

Filadelfia is located right in the center of Tempisque Valley, which is described as an orographic valley, surrounded by a range of hills with a height not exceeding 200 m.

=== Hydrography & Climate ===
The district is drained by the Tempisque River which provides easy access to the Gulf of Nicoya. The temperature is very hot and averages between 27 and 28 °C in the rainy season and during summer between 34 and 36 °C.

Filadelfia city is located near the banks of Rio Tempisque and Rio Las Palmas. Due to the ocean-atmosphere phenomenon known as El niño, these two rivers have caused serious floods in the months of October in 1995 (the first flood since the 1960s), 1999 and 2007.

== Locations ==
- Barrios: Bambú, Cinco Esquinas, Hollywood, La Cruz, Santa Lucía
- Poblados: Ballena (part), Corralillo, Guinea, Isleta (part), Jocote, Juanilama, Moralito, Ojoche, San Francisco

== Archeology ==
One of the attractions offered by this district are the archaeological investigations which have found variety of pieces dating back thousands of years, which is why it is known as Archaeological City, however, the municipality officially seeks that title by executive decree, with the purpose of developing an entire project to publicize and promote this area of archaeological treasures that come from 800 BC to 1500 AD, belonging to periods polychrome Old, Middle and Late.

=== Pre-Columbian Roads ===
The different archaeological studies conducted in this region, refer to various types of roads and paths, used by ancient people. Among them stand out paved rocky roads and made by soil.

The other type of archaeological interest are the paths of land, whether it is lumpy or not. In the place known as La Ceiba, there was a road of this type. The path was about 40–50 cm wide, indicating that people walk in single file, i.e. one after the other. In this case it seems that caked sand was used in its construction, perhaps that is because the state of conservation.

== Economy ==
Filadelfia lies in the middle reaches of the Tempisque River surrounded by large fields devoted to sugarcane cultivation. The local economy is thus centered on this economically important crop. Within the district there are two million-dollar-grossing companies focusing on the processing and packaging of the sugarcane and melons.

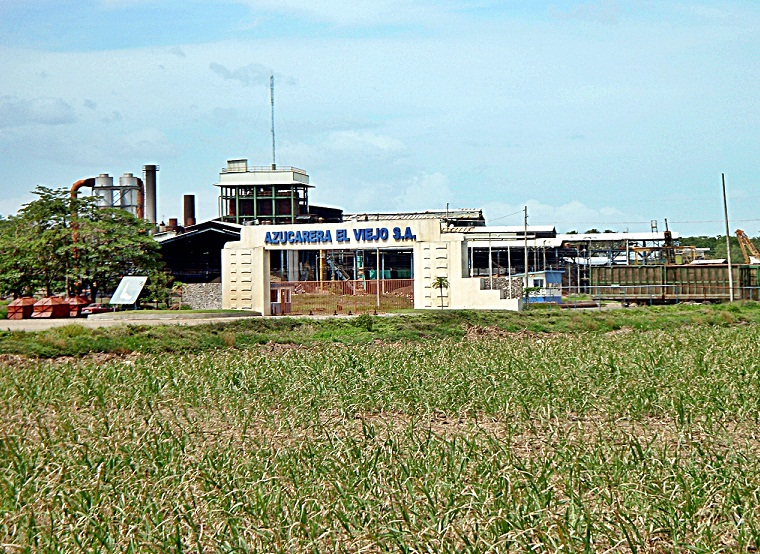
Main entrance to the mill

=== El Viejo Mill ===
The main sugar mill in the district is the Azucarera El Viejo, S.A., a Costa Rican company with the annual production of some 50,000 tons of raw and refined sugar. It processes half a million tons of cane yearly, grown by over 500 farmers in the Tempisque basin.

In addition to the sugar, the plant also produces animal-feed byproducts and electricity-generating biomass from the cane waste. The animal feed is used as nutritional supplements for cattle and other ruminants. Azucarera El Viejo also maintains a private wildlife reserve of 2000-plus hectares, protecting a large number of local flora and fauna typical of dry tropical forest in the region.

=== Melon Company ===
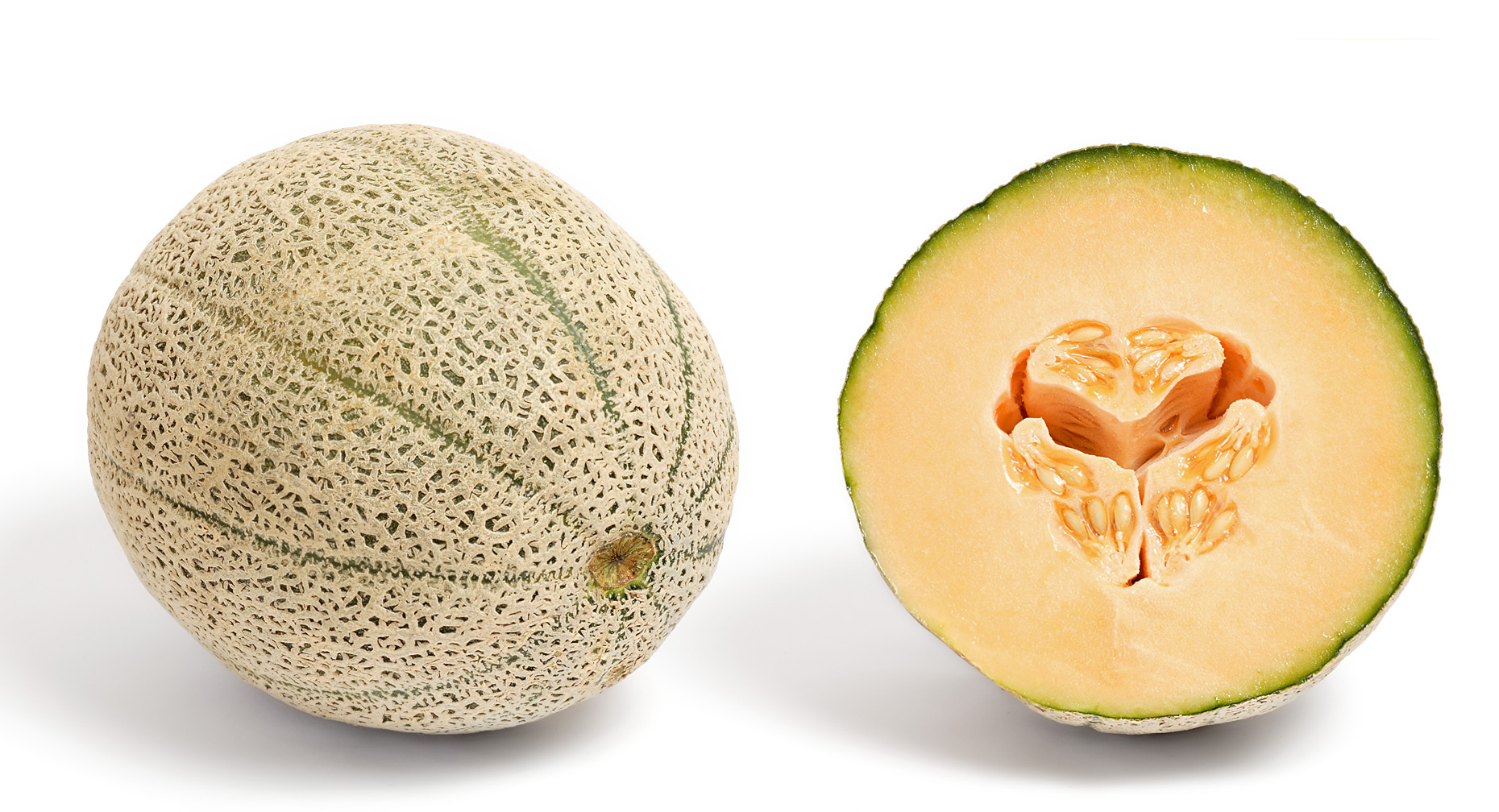
Cantaloupe

Melones de Costa Rica, S.A. started in 1988 in Filadelfia as a second project. Production is 100% for export to countries like the United States and Europe. One of the benefits that this crop is brought employment to many people.

Melon planting starts in November and ends in February, is collected from January to early May, the vegetative cycle for production is 60 days.

Melon varieties used are the cantaloupe, which produces approximately 1,200 boxes per hectare, which is considered a good production, other variety cultivated is honeydew that produces about 2,000 boxes per hectare average. The market price of the latter is lower. The export of melon requires strict control of product quality and optimum temperature and adequate transportation.

== Celebrations ==
=== Sports & Cultural ===
The city held some activities during the first fortnight of July. This is called "Cultural and Sports Week." Activities include recreation for children and adults as well as masses:

- Sports
1. Cycling
2. Chess
3. Soccer
4. Basketball
5. Futsal
- Cultural
1. Typical dances
2. Parades
3. Theatre
4. Interpretation of regional songs and music
5. Typical meals

=== Religious ===
- As well of the rest of the country, Filadelfia celebrates the Holy Week with all its processions, masses, prayers and formalities.
- In July are celebrated the patron saint activities to Santiago Mayor. Activities include: selling food, masses and other religious events.
- "Los Portales" (The Mangers) is an activity of the place held on each December 24, which begins at 5 pm and ends at 8 pm. This tradition is like a combination of Las Posadas (Mexico & Spain) and Trick-or-treating (United States). This celebration consists of going to the houses of the town where there is a manger. The goal is to visit the baby Jesus and give a small charity (Almsgiving is usually ₡5 to ₡20, equivalent to $0.03, and it is voluntary). When the alms is presented to the baby Jesus, the owner of the house gives another present to the one who gives the almsgiving, this may be a drink (usually chicha), appetizers, candy or small gifts. Children are the ones who enjoy more these activities, they are accompanied by their parents. There is no ceremony or ritual done during the visit, is only the act of visiting.

== Demographics ==
Historical population
| Census | Pop. | ±% p.a. |
|---|---|---|
| 1883 | 583 | — |
| 1892 | 778 | +3.26% |
| 1927 | 1,339 | +1.56% |
| 1950 | 2,093 | +1.96% |
| 1963 | 3,111 | +3.10% |
| 1973 | 4,484 | +3.72% |
| 1984 | 5,353 | +1.62% |
| 2000 | 7,143 | +1.82% |
| 2011 | 7,953 | +0.98% |
| 2022 | 8,677 | +0.80% |
Source: Instituto Nacional de Estadística y Censos; Centro Centroamericano de Población

For the 2011 census, Filadelfia had a population of 7,953 inhabitants.

== Transportation ==
=== Road transportation ===
The district is covered by the following road routes:

- National Route 21
- National Route 920

== Photo gallery ==
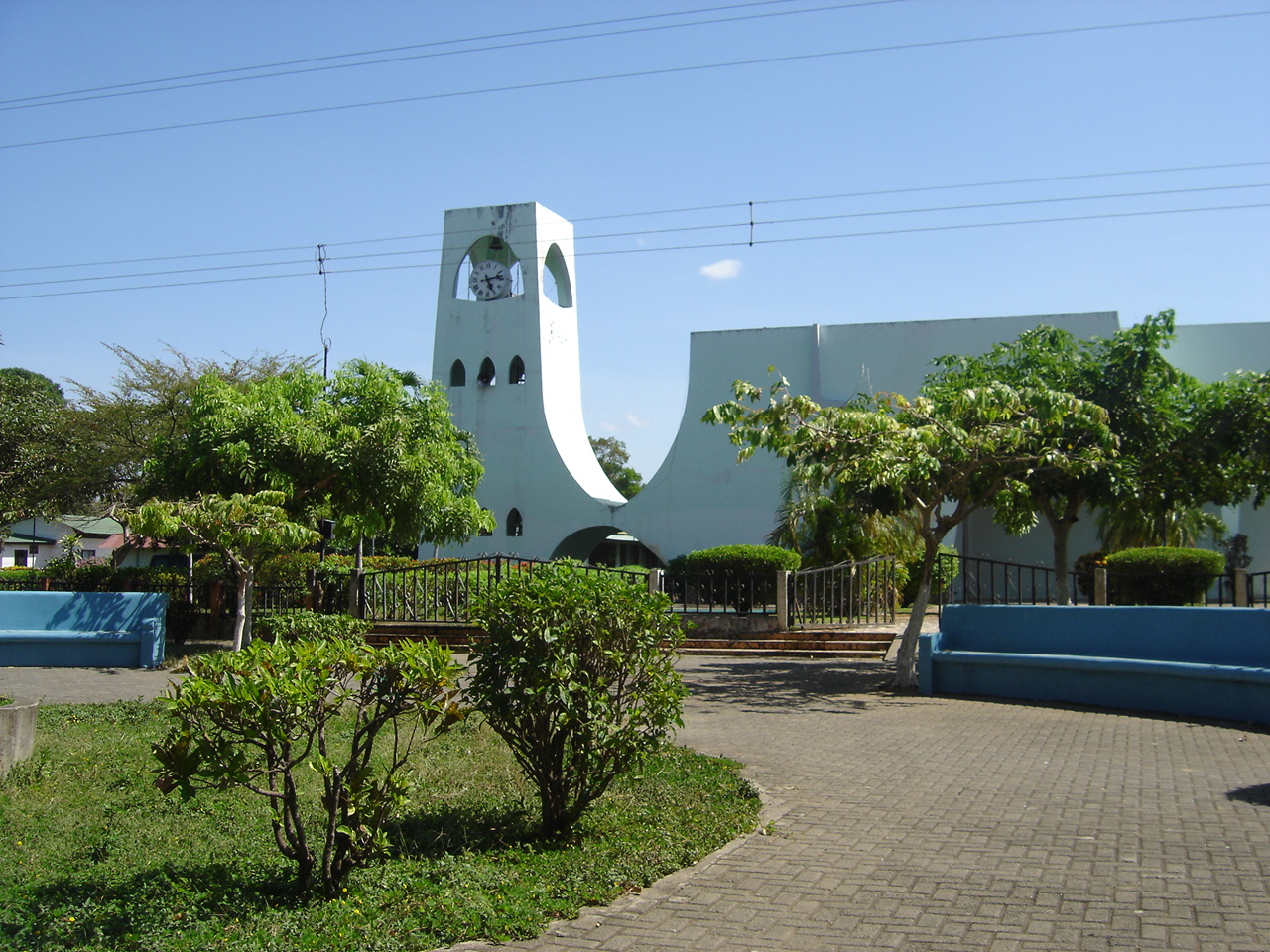
Main church of Filadelfia

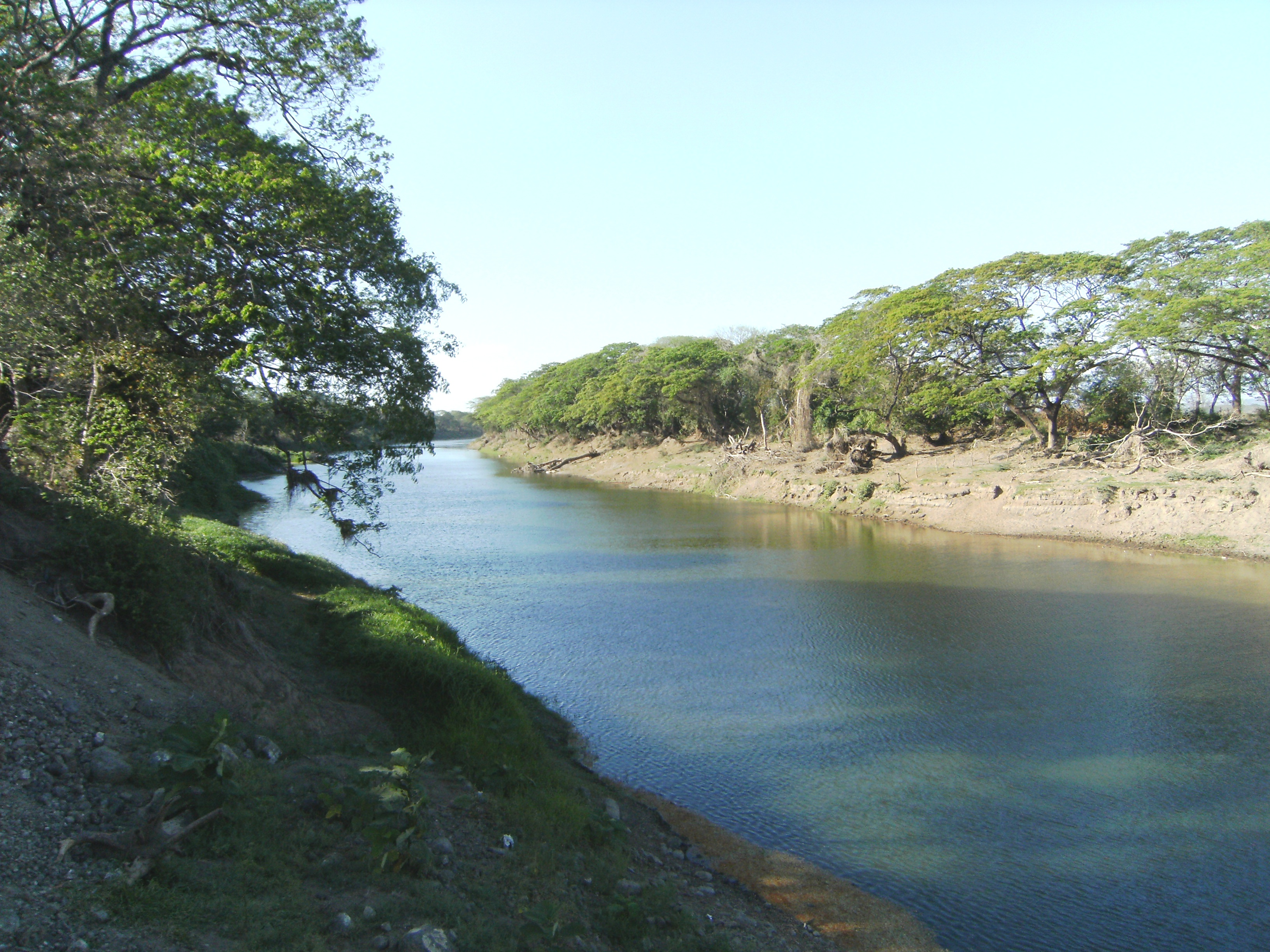
Tempisque River in Filadelfia

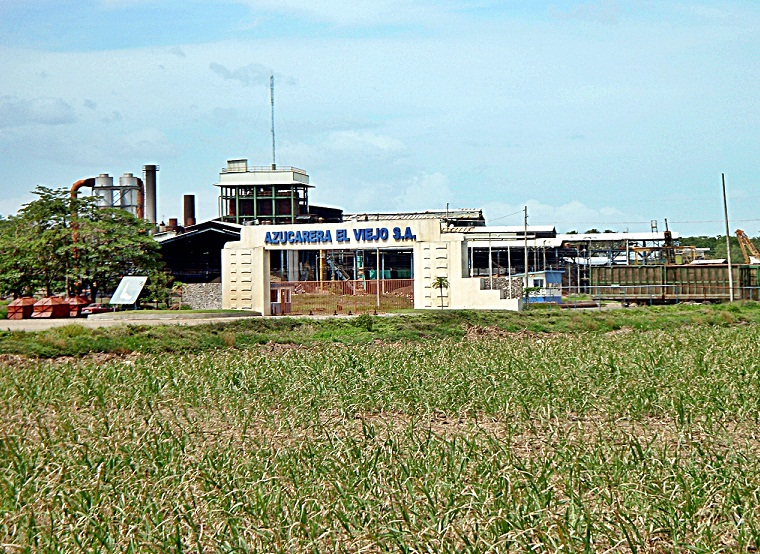
Sugar Mill in Filadelfia

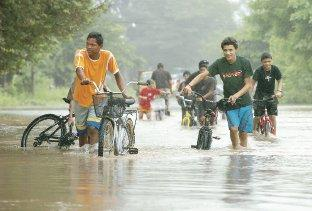
2007 Floods in the hamlet of Bambú

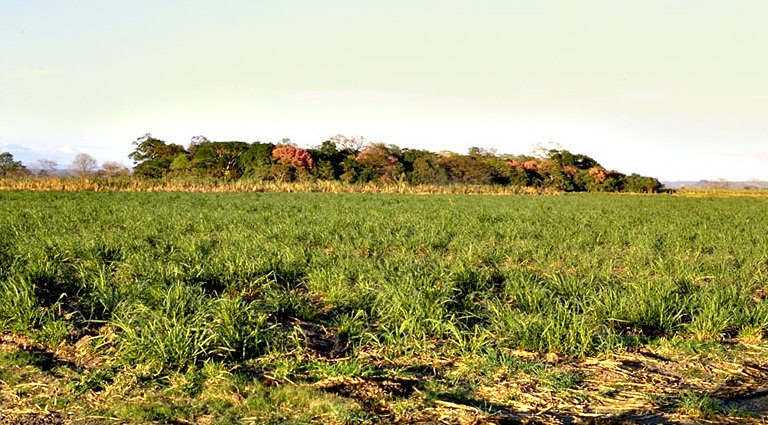
Crop of sugarcane for El Viejo Mill
