= Mayorga de Liberia =

District in Liberia canton, Guanacaste province, Costa Rica

Mayorga
- District
- Interactive map of Mayorga
- Mayorga district location in Costa Rica
- Coordinates: 10.8488568°N 85.47089°W
- Country: Costa Rica
- Province: Guanacaste
- Canton: Liberia
- Creation: 26 November 1971

Area
  - Total: 227.39 km^{2} (87.80 sq mi)
- Elevation: 366 m (1,201 ft)

Population (2011)
  - Total: 1,599
  - Density: 7.032/km^{2} (18.21/sq mi)
- Time zone: UTC−06:00
- Postal code: 50103

Mayorga is a district of the Liberia canton, in the Guanacaste province of Costa Rica.

== History ==
Mayorga was created on 26 November 1971 by Decreto Ejecutivo 2077-G. Segregated from Cañas Dulces.

== Geography ==
Mayorga has an area of 227.39 km^{2} (87.80 sq mi) and an elevation of 366 metres.

== Demographics ==
Historical population
Census	Pop.	±% p.a.
1973	956	—
1984	976	+0.19%
2000	1,288	+1.75%
2011	1,599	+1.99%
2022	2,360	+3.60%
Source: Instituto Nacional de Estadística y Censos; Centro Centroamericano de Población

For the 2011 census, Mayorga had a population of 1,599 inhabitants.

== Villages ==
Administrative center of the district is García Flamenco, other villages ar Argentina and Buenavista.

== Transportation ==
=== Road transportation ===
The district is covered by the following road routes:

- National Route 1
- National Route 917
