= Carrillo (canton) =

Canton in Guanacaste province, Costa Rica

- Canton
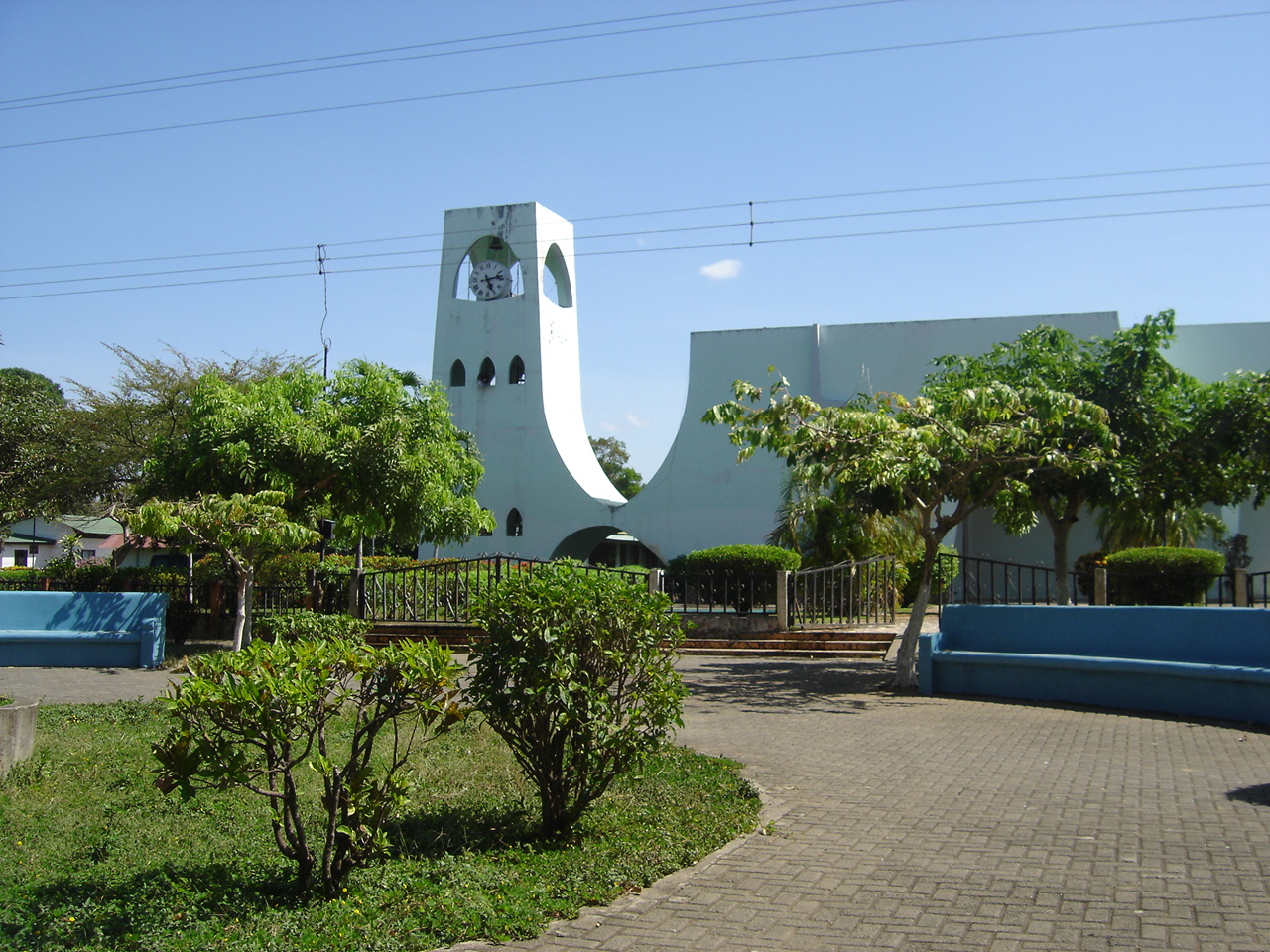
- Church in Filadelfia, Carrillo

- Flag
- Interactive map of Carrillo
- Carrillo canton location in Costa Rica
- Coordinates: 10.4819401°N 85.5973075°W
- Country: Costa Rica
- Province: Guanacaste
- Creation: 16 June 1877
- Head city: Filadelfia
- Districts: Districts: Filadelfia; Palmira; Sardinal; Belén

Government
  - Type: Municipality
  - Body: Municipalidad de Carrillo

Area
  - Total: 577.54 km^{2} (222.99 sq mi)
- Elevation: 30 m (98 ft)

Population (2011)
  - Total: 37,122
  - Density: 64.276/km^{2} (166.47/sq mi)
- Time zone: UTC−06:00
- Canton code: 505
- Website: www.municarrillo.go.cr

Carrillo is a canton in the Guanacaste province of Costa Rica. The head city is in Filadelfia district.

== Toponymy ==
The name of the canton is in honor of former head of state Braulio Carrillo Colina.

== History ==
Carrillo was created on 16 June 1877 by decree 22.

In the 18th century a group of Ladinos settled on the west bank of the middle Tempisque River, where there was a grove of trees called "sietecueros" (Lonchocarpus costericensi), giving rise to the population that corresponds to the city of Filadelfia, head of the canton.

In Executive Decree No. 22 of June 16, 1877, Carrillo was declared a canton of Guanacaste province. The oldest population of the canton is Sardinal, proof of this is the mention of the place made by Brother Don Antonio Muñoz, following his visit in late 1794 for a collection of handouts that he performed in several villages of Guanacaste.

In the 1830s, the residents of the neighborhoods of Sietecueros and Sardinal asked the then Head of State, Braulio Carrillo Colina, to be separated from the village of Santa Cruz and to be incorporated into Guanacaste City (now Liberia) in a civil and ecclesiastical way. This request was received when it was issued the Decree No. 5 of February 23, 1839.

In the school division in 1886, Sardinal was selected as the second school district of the canton in Law No. 60 of August 9, and Filadelfia was selected as part of the first school district. The main high school (Colegio Técnico Profesional Agropecuario, Agricultural Vocational Technical High School) began his teaching activities in 1965, during the administration of Francisco Orlich Bolmarcich.

== Geography ==
Carrillo has an area of 577.54 km^{2} (222.99 sq mi) and a mean elevation of 30 metres.

The canton is shaped like a boot, with the Pacific Ocean at the top. The Tempisque River decorates the front of the boot from top to toe. The Cañas and Bolsón rivers provide the heel and sole of the shape.

The canton borders with Liberia to the north, Santa Cruz to the south, Bagaces to the east, and the Pacific Ocean to the west.

=== Geology ===
Carrillo is geologically constituted of materials of the Cretaceous, Tertiary and Quaternary, being Quaternary sedimentary rocks that dominate the region.

- Cretaceous rocks are volcanic sedimentary and intrusive.
- Among the materials of the Tertiary period, are sedimentary rocks of the Paleocene Eocene period, which corresponds to the formation of Barra Honda.
- In Quaternary materials are located sedimentary rocks of the Holocene period, such as wetlands located in the area adjacent to the site Dalia.

=== Hydrography ===
The river system of Carrillo corresponds to the Pacific slope, Nicoya Peninsula and North Coast.

- Tempisque River
- Bolsón River
- Las Palmas River
- Cañas River
- Sardinal River
- San Blas River
- Belén River
- Gallina River
- Carrizal River
- Coyolito River

All these watercourses rise in Carrillo, except for Tempisque and Cañas, these rivers run from northwest to southeast. Rivers Cañas, Bolsón and Tempisque are cantonal boundaries, the first two with Santa Cruz and the last with Liberia and Bagaces.

== Districts ==
The canton of Carrillo is subdivided into the following districts:

1. Filadelfia
2. Palmira
3. Sardinal
4. Belén

== Demographics ==
Historical population
| Census | Pop. | ±% p.a. |
|---|---|---|
| 1927 | 5,364 | — |
| 1950 | 7,002 | +1.17% |
| 1963 | 11,396 | +3.82% |
| 1973 | 14,893 | +2.71% |
| 1984 | 18,475 | +1.98% |
| 2000 | 27,306 | +2.47% |
| 2011 | 37,122 | +2.83% |
| 2022 | 48,227 | +2.41% |
Source: Instituto Nacional de Estadística y Censos; Centro Centroamericano de Población

For the 2011 census, Carrillo had a population of 37,122 inhabitants.

The movement of people (population) for these territories are from the party of Nicoya and Nicaragua, possibly gave rise to the towns of Sietecueros, Tamarindo, Boquerones, and Villita with people of mixed Spanish and indigenous people.

== Transportation ==
=== Road transportation ===
The canton is covered by the following road routes:

- National Route 21
- National Route 151
- National Route 155
- National Route 159
- National Route 253
- National Route 254
- National Route 255
- National Route 911
- National Route 912
- National Route 920

== Economy ==
During the 1980s and the early 1990s, this canton was one of the main producers of rice and cotton in Costa Rica. Due to El Niño and political reasons the production started to decay, causing losses of up to a thousand million colones, and the producers asked the government for a declaration of emergency.

This canton also provides more products such as:

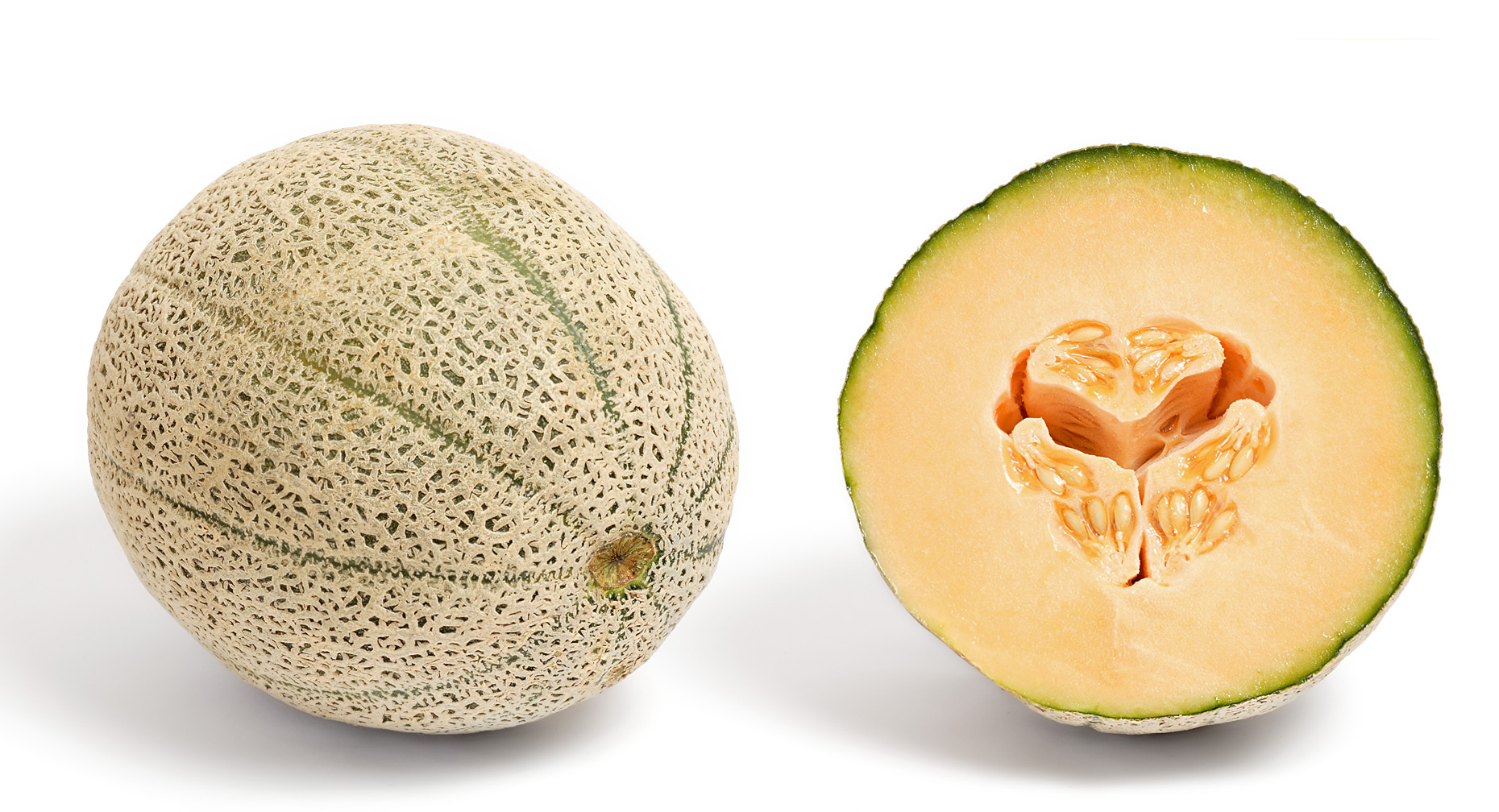
Cantaloupe

- Beans (Black, red & white ones) (Phaseolus vulgaris)
- Cotton (Gossypium hirsutum)
- Sorghum (Sorghum bicolor subsp. drummondii)
- Watermelon (Citrullus lanatus)
- Honeydew (Cucumis melo)

In this region highlights two millionaires-income products:

- Cantaloupe (Cucumis melo var. cantalupensis)
- Sugarcane (Saccharum officinarum)

El Viejo Mill, CATSA Mill are in charge of the production of sugar and Melones de Costa Rica is charge of the cantaloupe production.

=== Tourism ===
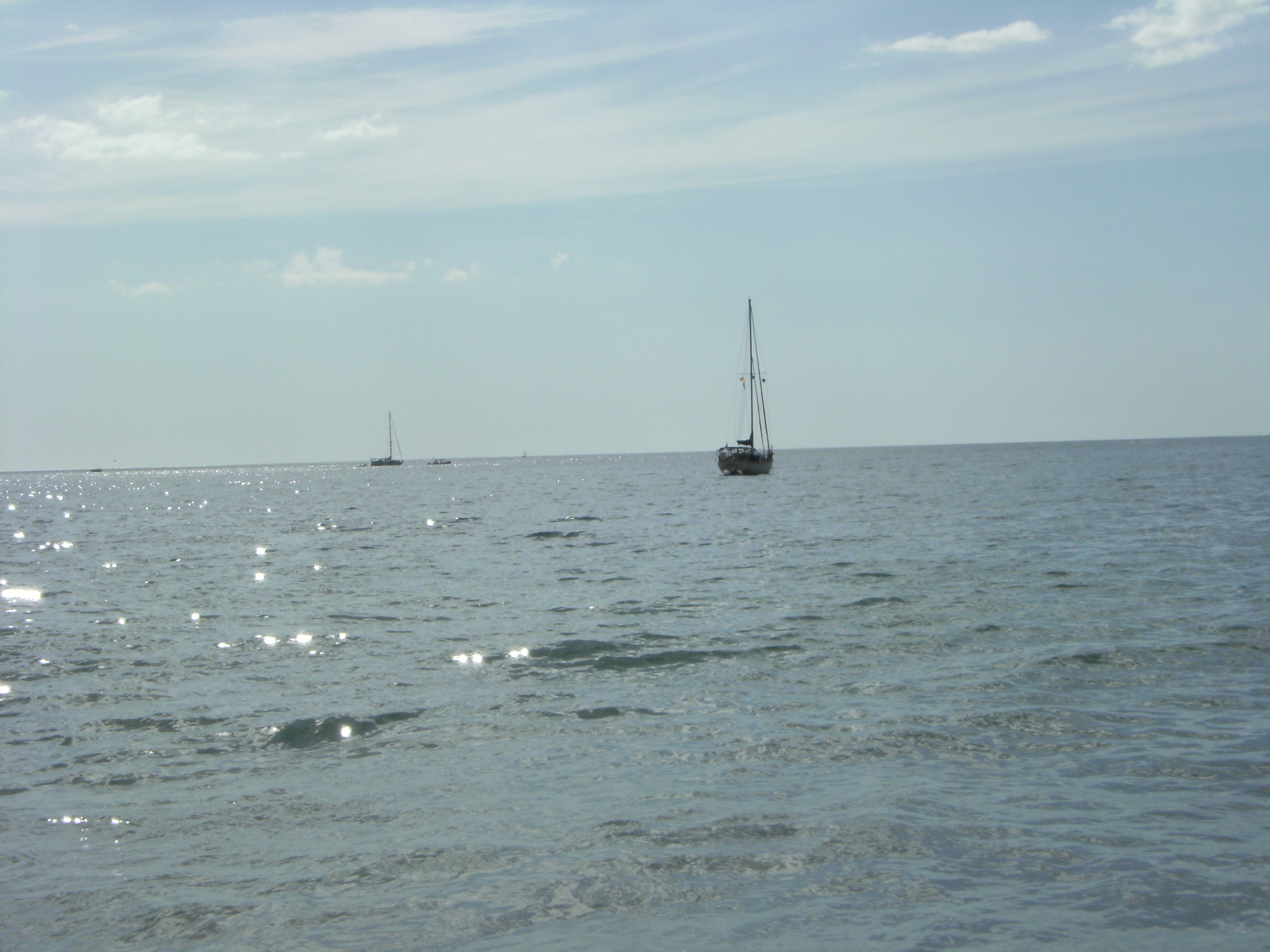
Sailing and fishing in Hermosa Beach

The canton receives revenue from its high tourism-related activities. Its main tourist attractions are the Gulf of Papagayo, Playa Hermosa, Playa Panama, Coco Beach, Playa Ocotal, among others, fishing and diving activities can be performed there.

Coco Beach is offering various services such as restaurants and hotels, on the other beaches there are hotels and resorts as "Los Corales", "Condovac La Costa", among others.

Tempisque River is another attraction that crosses the canton and passed by the city of Filadelfia, it is possible to practice water sports such as fishing, swimming, and sailing, crossing the most impressive vegetation and observing the various species of flora and wildlife that is around it.

This area is the center of archaeological research which has yielded variety of pieces dating back thousands of years, which is why it is known as the National Archaeological Region.

== Photo gallery ==
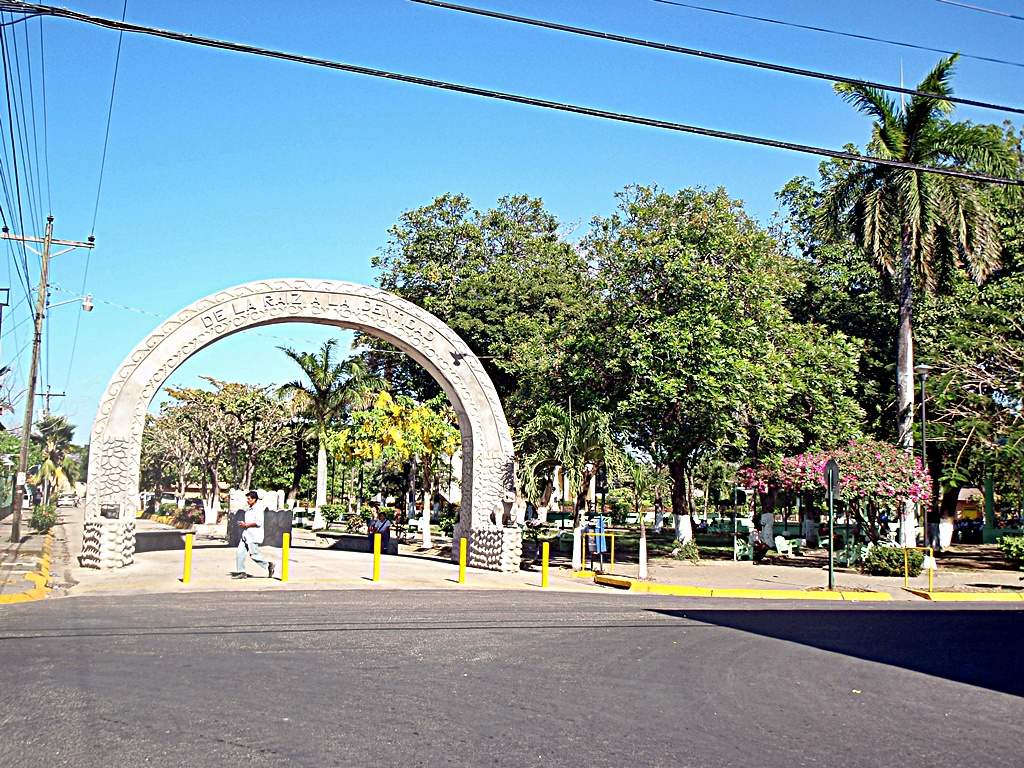
Park of Filadelfia.

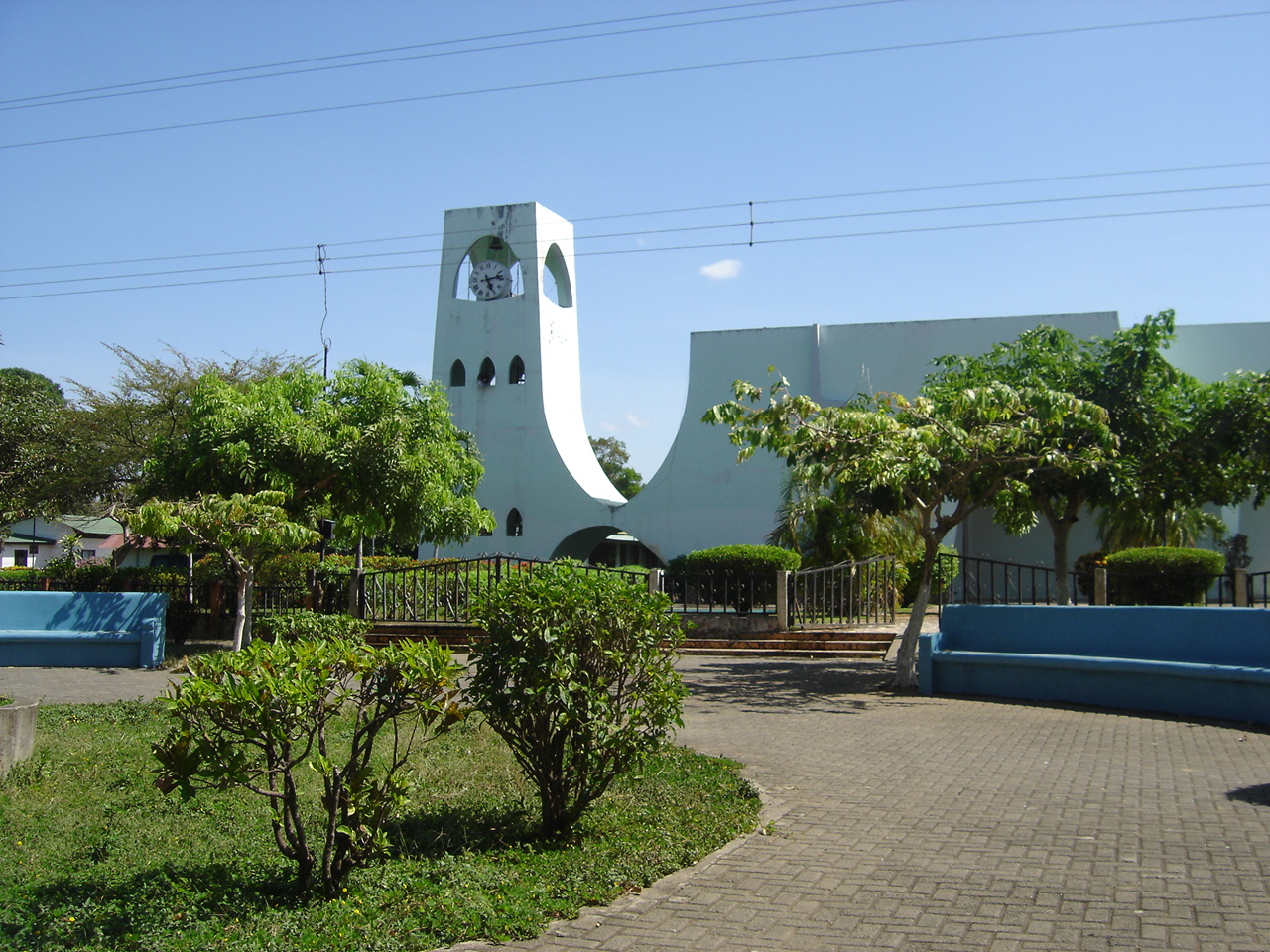
Main church of Filadelfia

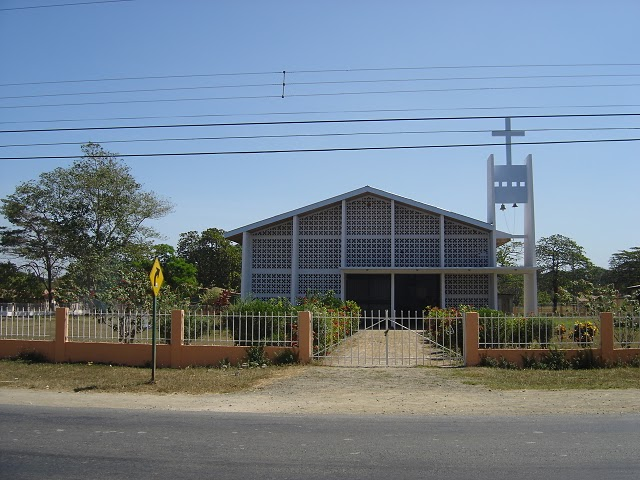
Church of Belén

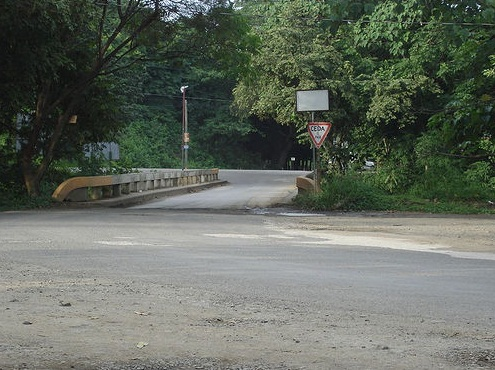
Main entrance to Sadinal town

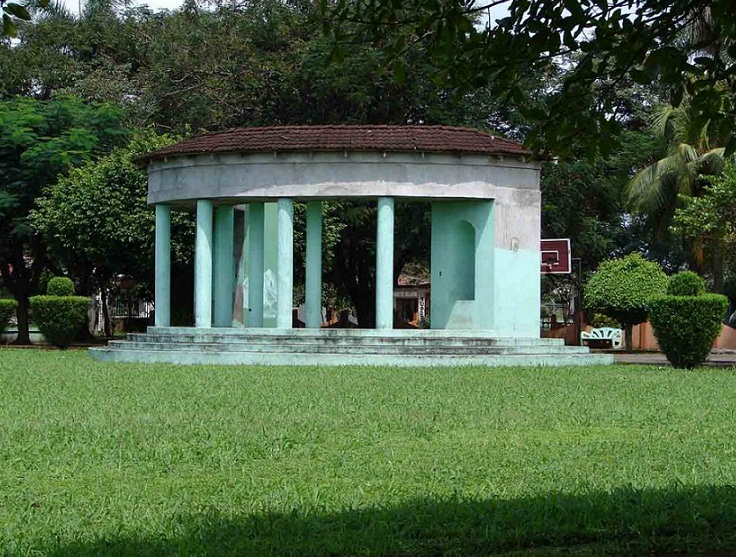
Kiosk in Palmira town

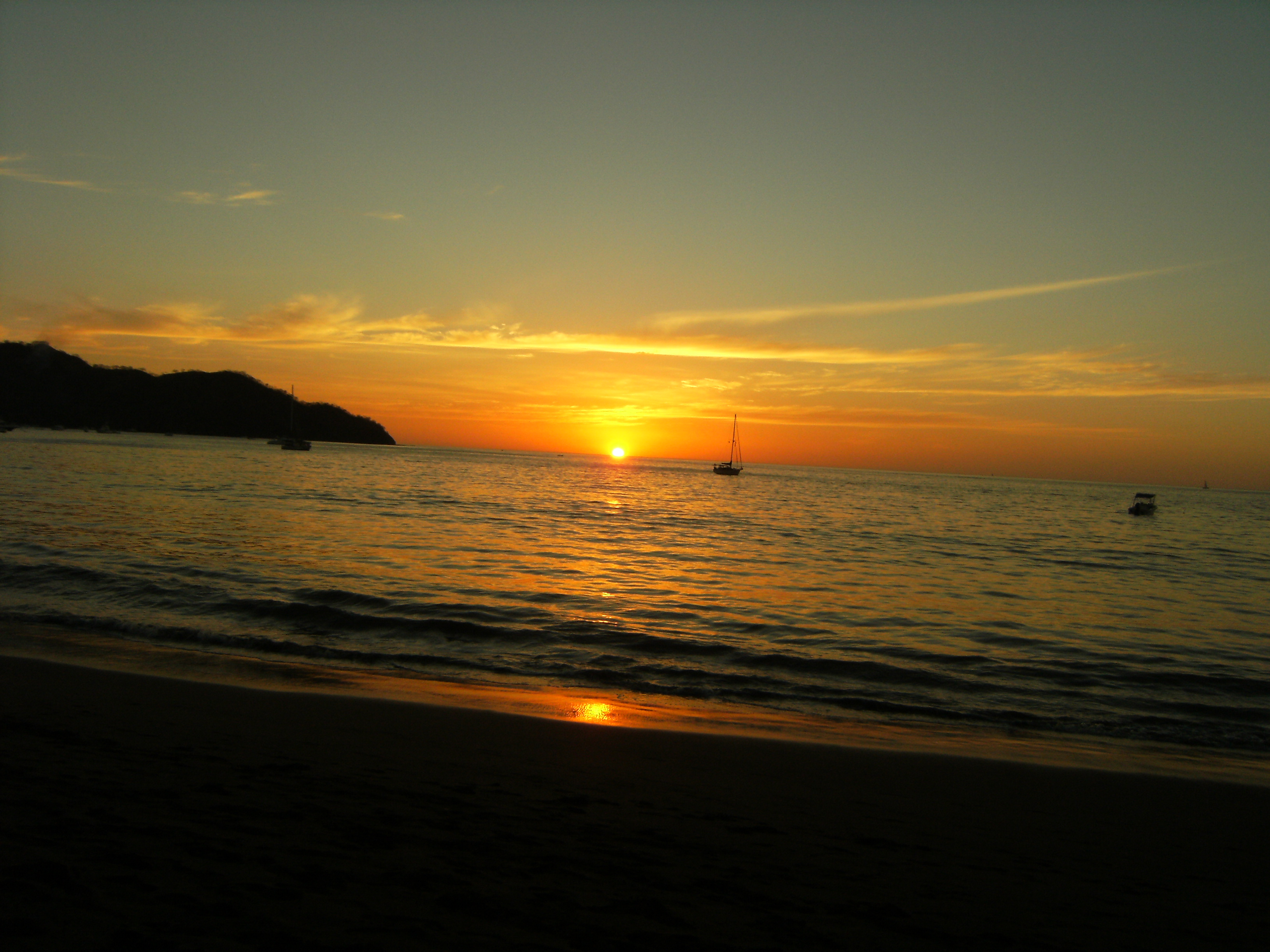
Sunset in Coco Beach

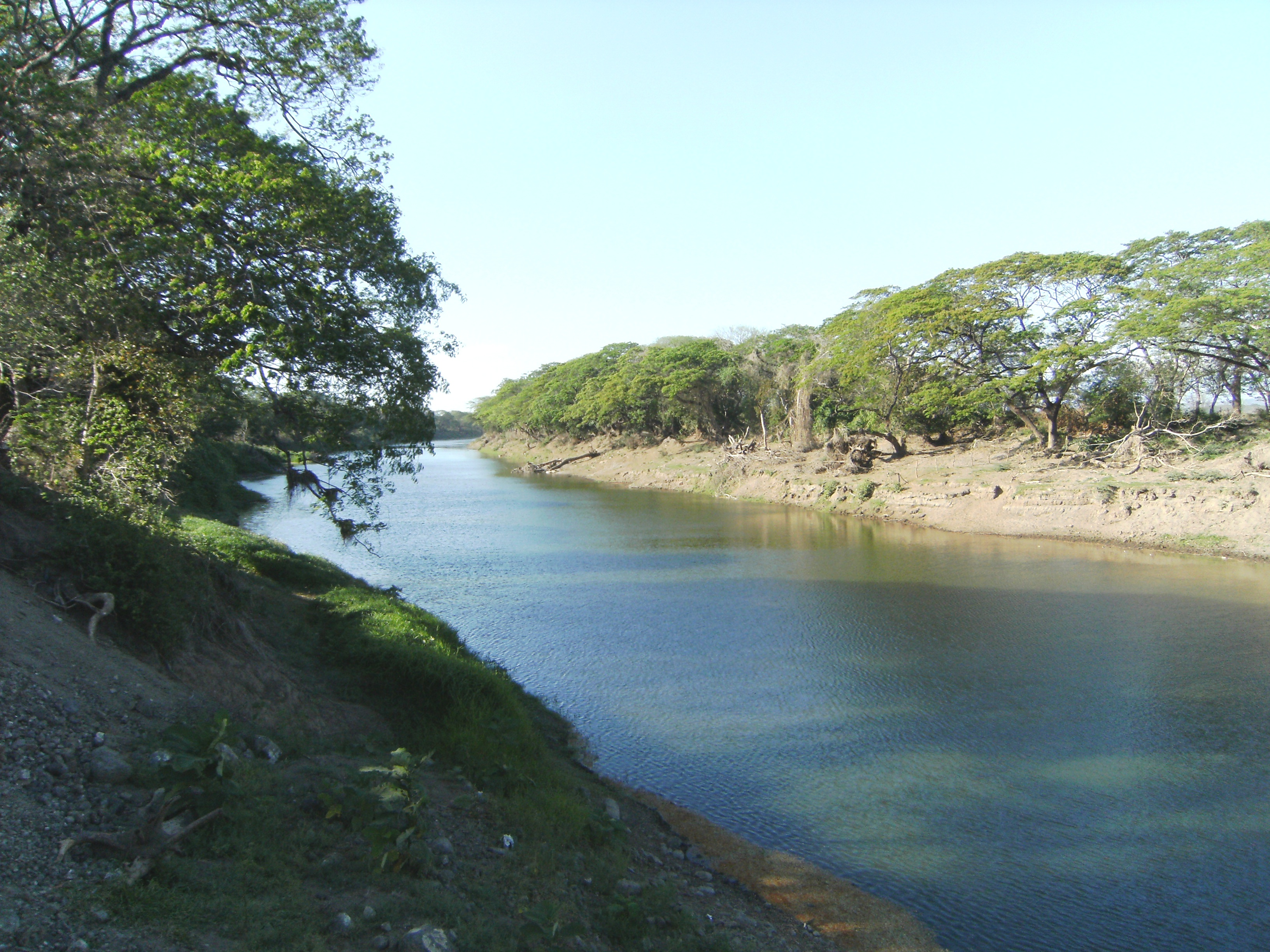
Tempisque River in Filadelfia

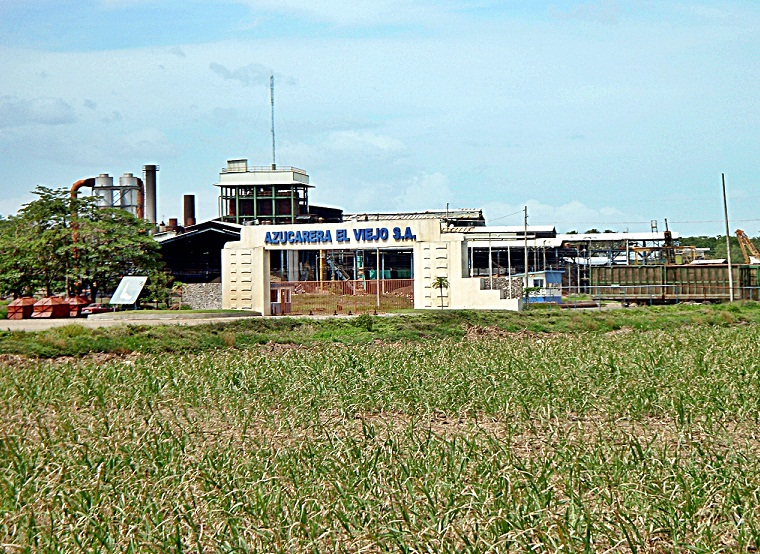
Sugar Mill in Filadelfia
