= Curubandé de Liberia =

District in Liberia canton, Guanacaste province, Costa Rica

Curubandé
- District
- Interactive map of Curubandé
- Curubandé district location in Costa Rica
- Coordinates: 10.736432°N 85.4330613°W
- Country: Costa Rica
- Province: Guanacaste
- Canton: Liberia
- Creation: 26 November 1971

Area
  - Total: 81.14 km^{2} (31.33 sq mi)
- Elevation: 322 m (1,056 ft)

Population (2011)
  - Total: 2,527
  - Density: 31.14/km^{2} (80.66/sq mi)
- Time zone: UTC−06:00
- Postal code: 50105

Curubandé is a district of the Liberia canton, in the Guanacaste province of Costa Rica.

== History ==
Curubandé was created on 26 November 1971 by Decreto Ejecutivo 2077-G. Segregated from Liberia.

== Geography ==
Curubandé has an area of 81.14 km^{2} and an elevation of 322 metres.

== Villages ==
Administrative center of the district is Cereceda. Other villages are Colorado and Curubandé.

== Demographics ==
Historical population
Census	Pop.	±% p.a.
1973	825	—
1984	997	+1.74%
2000	1,812	+3.80%
2011	2,527	+3.07%
2022	3,459	+2.90%
Source: Instituto Nacional de Estadística y Censos; Centro Centroamericano de Población

For the 2011 census, Curubandé had a population of 2,527 inhabitants.

== Transportation ==
=== Road transportation ===
The district is covered by the following road routes:

- National Route 1

== Economy ==
In recent years, Curubandé has become a center of tourism within Costa Rica. This is due in large part to the nearby Rincon de la Vieja National Park.

Curubandé is also the site of Las Pailas Geothermal Central, a large geothermal power plant that is being built to provide a large portion of Costa Rica's electric energy needs.
