= Palmira District, Carrillo =

District in Carrillo canton, Guanacaste province, Costa Rica

Palmira
- District
- Palmira district
- Palmira district location in Costa Rica
- Coordinates: 10.5451789°N 85.5896198°W
- Country: Costa Rica
- Province: Guanacaste
- Canton: Carrillo

Area
  - Total: 31.42 km^{2} (12.13 sq mi)
- Elevation: 24 m (79 ft)

Population (2011)
  - Total: 5,416
  - Density: 172.4/km^{2} (446.4/sq mi)
- Time zone: UTC−06:00
- Postal code: 50502

Palmira is a district of the Carrillo canton, in the Guanacaste province of Costa Rica.

== History ==
The district was originally known as Boquerones, a local word for Anchovies.

== Geography ==
Palmira has an area of 31.42 km^{2} (12.13 sq mi) and an elevation of 24 metres.

== Villages ==
Administrative center of the district is the village of Palmira.

Other villages in the district are Ángeles, Comunidad, Paso Tempisque (partly) and San Rafael.

== Demographics ==
Historical population
Census	Pop.	±% p.a.
1883	358	—
1892	553	+4.95%
1927	582	+0.15%
1950	374	−1.90%
1963	1,187	+9.29%
1973	1,574	+2.86%
1984	2,529	+4.41%
2000	3,974	+2.86%
2011	5,416	+2.85%
2022	6,791	+2.08%
Source: Instituto Nacional de Estadística y Censos; Centro Centroamericano de Población

For the 2011 census, Palmira had a population of 5,416 inhabitants.

== Transportation ==
=== Road transportation ===
The district is covered by the following road routes:

- National Route 21
- National Route 151
- National Route 253
- National Route 254
- National Route 912
