= National Route 939 (Costa Rica) =

National Road Route in Costa Rica

National Tertiary Route 939
- Ruta nacional terciaria 939

Route information
- Maintained by Ministry of Public Works and Transport
- Length: 6.650 km (4.132 mi)

Location
- Country: Costa Rica
- Provinces: Guanacaste

Highway system
- National Road Network of Costa Rica
← Route 938	→ Route 301

National Tertiary Route 939, or just Route 939 (Spanish: Ruta Nacional Terciaria 939, or Ruta 939) is a National Road Route of Costa Rica, located in the Guanacaste province.

== Description ==
In Guanacaste province the route covers La Cruz canton (La Cruz district).
