= La Cruz (canton) =

Canton in Guanacaste province, Costa Rica

- Canton
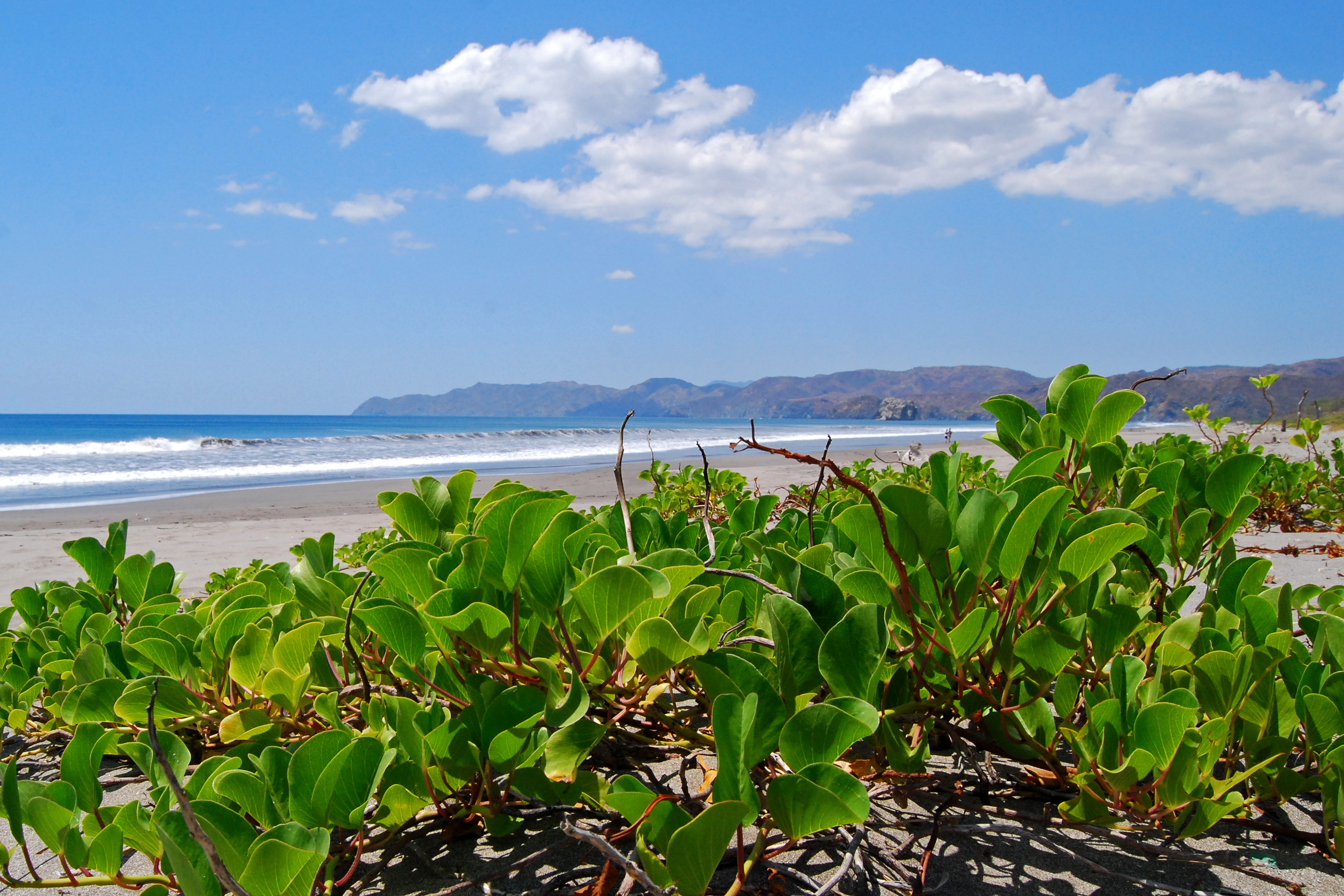
- Santa Rosa National Park

- Flag
- Interactive map of La Cruz
- La Cruz canton location in Costa Rica
- Coordinates: 11.0088867°N 85.6045426°W
- Country: Costa Rica
- Province: Guanacaste
- Creation: 23 July 1969
- Head city: La Cruz
- Districts: Districts: La Cruz; Santa Cecilia; Garita; Santa Elena

Government
  - Type: Municipality
  - Body: Municipalidad de La Cruz

Area
  - Total: 1,383.9 km^{2} (534.3 sq mi)
- Elevation: 226 m (741 ft)

Population (2011)
  - Total: 19,181
  - Density: 13.860/km^{2} (35.898/sq mi)
- Time zone: UTC−06:00
- Canton code: 510
- Website: www.munilacruz.go.cr

La Cruz is a canton in the Guanacaste province of Costa Rica. The head city is in La Cruz district.

== Toponymy ==
The name of La Cruz translates to The Cross and dates back to the incident at the time when the mules carried the cattle from Nicaragua to Esparza, when one of them passing through the region fell dead because he pursued a cow that had escaped from the herd. This is why their peers placed a cross of sticks on his grave. Later, this cross served as a reference to the mules that went over there to make a break and also count the cattle, before continuing their journey to their final destination. Over time the site led to the formation of a burgeoning population, which began to be known as La Cruz.

== History ==
La Cruz was created on 23 July 1969 by decree 4354. In Pre-Columbian times the area currently known as the canton de La Cruz, was part of a province of the Indians called Chorotegas whose domains ranged from the Nicoya Peninsula to Lake Nicaragua, made up of several villages or domains.

The region was discovered by Don Gil Gonzalez Davila in 1522, on their march to another province of the Chorotegas, which was under the authority of the chief of the Nicarao people (in the territory now known as Nicaragua). In 1561 Don Juan de Cavallon from Granada passed through this area in his expedition to reach the Central Valley. In September 1562 Juan Vásquez de Coronado passed by this area too, who brought cattle and horses from León. He also went through the region of Perafán de Ribera in his journey towards Cartago.

In the second half of the nineteenth century, the first farmers from Rivas, Nicaragua came to this region, beginning the formation of ranches. On March 20, 1856, our troops fought their first battle against the filibusters of William Walker in the Hacienda Santa Rosa, and succeeded in defeating the invaders.

In the government administration of Ascensión Esquivel Ibarra, in 1906 the school was located fifty meters east of the existing lookout built by the Instituto Costarricense de Turismo (National Tourism Chamber). In 1953, a new school was built called Salvador Villar Muñoz. The college named Liceo La Cruz began teaching in 1969, the government of José Joaquín Trejos Fernández as a supplementary educational secondary school, at first in the day and then at night, located at the school, in 1973 opened the current premises.

Law No. 20, the 18th of October 1915, was enacted in the territorial division for administrative purposes, in which La Cruz was the third district of Liberia's canton.

The first chapel was built in 1923, located at the northeast corner of the existing park. During the time of archbishop Monsignor Víctor Manuel Sanabria Martínez, second Archbishop of Costa Rica, in 1949, the parish was erected, with devotion to the Holy Cross, which is currently suffrage of the Diocese of Tilarán of the Ecclesiastical Province of Costa Rica.

The pipe was opened in the year 1946, in the administration of former president Teodoro Picado Michalski.

In the government of José Joaquín Trejos Fernández, on July 23, 1969, law No. 4354, was granted the title of Villa of the town of La Cruz, head of canton set up with that purpose. Later, in Act No. 4574 of May 4, 1970, promulgated the Municipal Code, third article, that confirmed that this villa was now a City because of being head of the canton.

On August 10, 1970 was held the first meeting of the Council of La Cruz, composed of the following owners: Piedad Loáiciga Salgado, President: Victor Manuel Hernandez Ortega, Vice President: Carlos Manuel Rodriguez Campos. The Municipal Executive was Sancho Felix Gallo and the City Clerk: Jose Luis Fallas Leitón.

== Geography ==
La Cruz has an area of 1,383.9 km^{2} (534.3 sq mi) and a mean elevation of 226 metres.

== Districts ==
The canton of La Cruz is subdivided into the following districts:

1. La Cruz
2. Santa Cecilia
3. Garita
4. Santa Elena

== Demographics ==
Historical population
Census	Pop.	±% p.a.
1973	8,333	—
1984	10,876	+2.45%
2000	16,505	+2.64%
2011	19,181	+1.38%
2022	26,829	+3.10%
Source: Instituto Nacional de Estadística y Censos; Centro Centroamericano de Población

For the 2011 census, La Cruz had a population of 19,181 inhabitants.

== Transportation ==
=== Road transportation ===
The canton is covered by the following road routes:

- National Route 1
- National Route 4
- National Route 170
- National Route 913
- National Route 914
- National Route 935
- National Route 937
- National Route 938
- National Route 939

== Economy ==
Approximately 72% of its economically active population worked in livestock, agriculture, and fisheries. Its further development was due to the opening of the Interamericana Street. The trade of Costa Rica with the rest of Central America has led the increase in the passage of vehicles to be bound by crossing La Cruz, encouraging them to people. The development of tourism in the region has generously helped the people of this canton, as many work in informal trade activities; others have turned their houses into small hotels and sodas. The arrival of tourists (domestic and foreign) to the beaches of the canton has been growing steadily, generating demand for luxury hotels and homes that have been developed across the coastal zone. The lack of appropriate places of healthy amusement leads to the consumption of beer, making alcoholism one of the major ills afflicting the canton. The limit is set by dividing the Guanacaste Volcanic Mountain Range, where the Orosi Volcano is located which gives a beautiful faraway view from the Bolaños Bay area. La Cruz is a small city that offers all the basic services and is located 45 minutes from Liberia which is the biggest city in Guanacaste.
