= National Route 256 (Costa Rica) =

National Road Route in Costa Rica

National Secondary Route 256
- Ruta nacional secundaria 256

Route information
- Maintained by Ministry of Public Works and Transport
- Length: 18.375 km (11.418 mi)

Location
- Country: Costa Rica
- Provinces: Limón

Highway system
- National Road Network of Costa Rica
← Route 255	→ Route 257

National Secondary Route 256, or just Route 256 (Spanish: Ruta Nacional Secundaria 256, or Ruta 256) is a National Road Route of Costa Rica, located in the Limón province.

== Description ==
In Limón province the route covers Talamanca canton (Cahuita district).
