= Sardinal =

District in Carrillo canton, Guanacaste province, Costa Rica

- District
- Sardinal district
- Sardinal district location in Costa Rica
- Coordinates: 10.5343352°N 85.6954664°W
- Country: Costa Rica
- Province: Guanacaste
- Canton: Carrillo

Area
  - Total: 261.43 km^{2} (100.94 sq mi)
- Elevation: 46 m (151 ft)

Population (2011)
  - Total: 14,912
  - Density: 57.040/km^{2} (147.73/sq mi)
- Time zone: UTC−06:00
- Postal code: 50503

Sardinal is a district of the Carrillo canton, in the Guanacaste province of Costa Rica.

== Geography ==
Sardinal has an area of 261.43 square kilometres (100.94 sq mi) and an elevation of 46 metres (151 ft).

== Villages ==
Administrative center of the district is the town of Sardinal.

Other villages in the district are Artola, Cacique, Coco, Guacamaya, Huaquitas, Libertad, Matapalo, Nancital, Nuevo Colón, Obandito, Ocotal, Pilas, Playa Hermosa, Playones, San Blas, Santa Rita and Zapotal.

== Demographics ==
Historical population
Census	Pop.	±% p.a.
1883	797	—
1892	1,107	+3.72%
1927	1,854	+1.48%
1950	2,623	+1.52%
1963	3,712	+2.71%
1973	4,732	+2.46%
1984	5,952	+2.11%
2000	10,118	+3.37%
2011	14,912	+3.59%
2022	21,099	+3.21%
Source: Instituto Nacional de Estadística y Censos; Centro Centroamericano de Población

For the 2011 census, Sardinal had a population of 14,912 inhabitants.

== Transportation ==
=== Road transportation ===
The district is covered by the following road routes:

- National Route 151
- National Route 159
- National Route 254
- National Route 255
- National Route 911
- National Route 912
