= National Route 254 (Costa Rica) =

National Road Route in Costa Rica

National Secondary Route 254
- Ruta nacional secundaria 254

Route information
- Maintained by Ministry of Public Works and Transport
- Length: 8.380 km (5.207 mi)

Location
- Country: Costa Rica
- Provinces: Guanacaste

Highway system
- National Road Network of Costa Rica
← Route 253	→ Route 255

National Secondary Route 254, or just Route 254 (Spanish: Ruta Nacional Secundaria 254, or Ruta 254) is a National Road Route of Costa Rica, located in the Guanacaste province.

== Description ==
In Guanacaste province the route covers Carrillo canton (Palmira and Sardinal districts).
