= National Route 253 (Costa Rica) =

National Road Route in Costa Rica

National Secondary Route 253
- Ruta nacional secundaria 253

Route information
- Maintained by Ministry of Public Works and Transport
- Length: 19.655 km (12.213 mi)

Location
- Country: Costa Rica
- Provinces: Guanacaste

Highway system
- National Road Network of Costa Rica
← Route 252	→ Route 254

National Secondary Route 253, or just Route 253 (Spanish: Ruta Nacional Secundaria 253, or Ruta 253) is a National Road Route of Costa Rica, located in the Guanacaste province.

== Description ==
In Guanacaste province the route covers Liberia canton (Nacascolo district) and Carrillo canton (Palmira district).
