= National Route 170 (Costa Rica) =

National Road Route in Costa Rica

National Secondary Route 170
- Ruta nacional secundaria 170

Route information
- Maintained by Ministry of Public Works and Transport
- Length: 22.885 km (14.220 mi)

Location
- Country: Costa Rica
- Provinces: Alajuela, Guanacaste

Highway system
- National Road Network of Costa Rica
← Route 169	→ Route 171

National Secondary Route 170, or just Route 170 (Spanish: Ruta Nacional Secundaria 170, or Ruta 170) is a National Road Route of Costa Rica located in the Alajuela and Guanacaste provinces.

== Description ==
In Alajuela province the route covers Upala canton (San José district).

In Guanacaste province the route covers La Cruz canton (Santa Cecilia district).
