= National Route 159 (Costa Rica) =

National Road Route in Costa Rica

National Secondary Route 159
- Ruta nacional secundaria 159

Route information
- Maintained by Ministry of Public Works and Transport
- Length: 10.905 km (6.776 mi)

Location
- Country: Costa Rica
- Provinces: Guanacaste

Highway system
- National Road Network of Costa Rica
← Route 158	→ Route 160

National Secondary Route 159, or just Route 159 (Spanish: Ruta Nacional Secundaria 159, or Ruta 159) is a National Road Route of Costa Rica located in the Guanacaste province.

== Description ==
In Guanacaste province the route covers Carrillo canton (Sardinal district).
