= National Route 255 (Costa Rica) =

National Road Route in Costa Rica

National Secondary Route 255
- Ruta nacional secundaria 255

Route information
- Maintained by Ministry of Public Works and Transport
- Length: 1.780 km (1.106 mi)

Location
- Country: Costa Rica
- Provinces: Guanacaste

Highway system
- National Road Network of Costa Rica
← Route 254	→ Route 256

National Secondary Route 255, or just Route 255 (Spanish: Ruta Nacional Secundaria 255, or Ruta 255) is a National Road Route of Costa Rica, located in the Guanacaste province.

== Description ==
In Guanacaste province the route covers Carrillo canton (Sardinal district).
