= Belén District, Carrillo =

District in Carrillo canton, Guanacaste province, Costa Rica

Belén
- District
- Interactive map of Belén
- Belén district location in Costa Rica
- Coordinates: 10.406149°N 85.5647058°W
- Country: Costa Rica
- Province: Guanacaste
- Canton: Carrillo
- Creation: 16 June 1877

Area
  - Total: 181.55 km^{2} (70.10 sq mi)
- Elevation: 34 m (112 ft)

Population (2011)
  - Total: 8,841
  - Density: 48.70/km^{2} (126.1/sq mi)
- Time zone: UTC−06:00
- Postal code: 50504

Belén is a district of the Carrillo canton, in the Guanacaste province of Costa Rica.

== Toponymy ==
Originally known as Villita (Little Village), its current name of Belén is the Spanish name for Bethlehem and comes in the wake of the festivities that were held each 25 December dedicated to the Child Jesus, since the priest Fray Juan Paz arrived in the community in 1885 and saw the devotion of the people for the Child Jesus of Bethlehem and he proposed the name for that community.

== History ==
Belén was created on 16 June 1877 by Decreto 22. Belén was segregated from Santa Cruz canton. The present church was built in 1969, and the park was built in the period 1974-1978.

== Geography ==
Belén has an area of 181.55 km^{2} and an elevation of 34 metres.

== Villages ==
Administrative center of the district is the village of Belén.

Other villages in the district are Alto San Antonio, Cachimbo, Castilla de Oro, Coyolito, Gallina, Juanilama, Loma Bonita, Llano, Ojochal, Palestina, Palmas, Paraíso, Penca, Planes, Poroporo, Río Cañas Nuevo, Santa Ana, Santo Domingo.

== Demographics ==
Historical population
Census	Pop.	±% p.a.
1927	1,589	—
1950	1,912	+0.81%
1963	3,386	+4.49%
1973	4,103	+1.94%
1984	4,641	+1.13%
2000	6,071	+1.69%
2011	8,841	+3.48%
2022	11,660	+2.55%
Source: Instituto Nacional de Estadística y Censos; Centro Centroamericano de Población

For the 2011 census, Belén had a population of 8,841 inhabitants.

== Transportation ==
=== Road transportation ===
The district is covered by the following road routes:

- National Route 21
- National Route 155
