= Nacascolo =

District in Liberia canton, Guanacaste province, Costa Rica

- District
- Nacascolo district
- Nacascolo district location in Costa Rica
- Coordinates: 10.6992413°N 85.6117321°W
- Country: Costa Rica
- Province: Guanacaste
- Canton: Liberia
- Creation: 26 November 1971

Area
  - Total: 327.05 km^{2} (126.27 sq mi)
- Elevation: 29 m (95 ft)

Population (2011)
  - Total: 2,249
  - Density: 6.877/km^{2} (17.81/sq mi)
- Time zone: UTC−06:00
- Postal code: 50104

Nacascolo is a district of the Liberia canton, in the Guanacaste province of Costa Rica.

== History ==
Nacascolo was created on 26 November 1971 by Decreto Ejecutivo 2077-G. Segregated from Liberia.

== Geography ==
Nacascolo has an area of 327.05 km^{2} and an elevation of 29 metres.

== Villages ==
Administrative center of the district is Guardia. Other villages are Bejuco, Nacascolo, Oratorio, Puerto Culebra and Triunfo.

== Demographics ==
Historical population
Census	Pop.	±% p.a.
1973	1,039	—
1984	1,316	+2.17%
2000	1,727	+1.71%
2011	2,249	+2.43%
2022	3,902	+5.14%
Source: Instituto Nacional de Estadística y Censos; Centro Centroamericano de Población

For the 2011 census, Nacascolo had a population of 2,249 inhabitants.

== Transportation ==
=== Road transportation ===
The district is covered by the following road routes:

- National Route 1
- National Route 21
- National Route 253
- National Route 913
