= Santa Elena District, La Cruz =

District in La Cruz canton, Guanacaste province, Costa Rica

Santa Elena
- District
- Santa Elena district
- Santa Elena district location in Costa Rica
- Coordinates: 10.8935505°N 85.7202529°W
- Country: Costa Rica
- Province: Guanacaste
- Canton: La Cruz

Area
  - Total: 513.35 km^{2} (198.21 sq mi)
- Elevation: 10 m (33 ft)

Population (2011)
  - Total: 2,040
  - Density: 3.97/km^{2} (10.3/sq mi)
- Time zone: UTC−06:00
- Postal code: 51004

Santa Elena is a district of the La Cruz canton in the Guanacaste province of Costa Rica.

== Geography ==
Santa Elena has an area of 513.35 km^{2} and an elevation of 10 metres.

== Villages ==
Administrative center of the district is the village of Cuajiniquil.

Other villages in the district are Cedros, Guaria, Puerto Castilla and Rabo de Mico (Aguacaliente).

== Demographics ==
Historical population
Census	Pop.	±% p.a.
1973	717	—
1984	976	+2.84%
2000	1,806	+3.92%
2011	2,040	+1.11%
2022	2,297	+1.08%
Source: Instituto Nacional de Estadística y Censos; Centro Centroamericano de Población

For the 2011 census, Santa Elena had a population of 2,040 inhabitants.

== Transportation ==
=== Road transportation ===
The district is covered by the following road routes:

- National Route 1
- National Route 913
- National Route 914
- National Route 937
