= Santa Cecilia District =

District in La Cruz canton, Guanacaste province, Costa Rica

Santa Cecilia
- District
- Santa Cecilia district
- Santa Cecilia district location in Costa Rica
- Coordinates: 11.0304897°N 85.3473015°W
- Country: Costa Rica
- Province: Guanacaste
- Canton: La Cruz

Area
  - Total: 258.16 km^{2} (99.68 sq mi)
- Elevation: 337 m (1,106 ft)

Population (2011)
  - Total: 6,258
  - Density: 24.24/km^{2} (62.78/sq mi)
- Time zone: UTC−06:00
- Postal code: 51002

Santa Cecilia is a district of the La Cruz canton, in the Guanacaste province of Costa Rica.

== Geography ==
Santa Cecilia has an area of 258.16 km^{2} (99.68 sq mi) and an elevation of 337 metres.

== Villages ==
Administrative center of the district is the village of Santa Cecilia.

Other villages in the district are Armenia, Belice, Bellavista, Brisas, Caoba, Esperanza, Flor del Norte, Lajosa, Marías, Palmares, San Antonio, San Cristóbal, San Rafael, San Vicente, Santa Elena, Sardina, and Virgen.

== Demographics ==
Historical population
Census	Pop.	±% p.a.
1973	2,054	—
1984	3,042	+3.63%
2000	5,238	+3.45%
2011	6,258	+1.63%
2022	9,269	+3.64%
Source: Instituto Nacional de Estadística y Censos; Centro Centroamericano de Población

For the 2011 census, Santa Cecilia had a population of 6,258 inhabitants.

== Transportation ==
=== Road transportation ===
The district is covered by the following road routes:

- National Route 4
- National Route 170
