= National Route 937 (Costa Rica) =

National Road Route in Costa Rica

National Tertiary Route 937
- Ruta nacional terciaria 937

Route information
- Maintained by Ministry of Public Works and Transport
- Length: 8.755 km (5.440 mi)

Location
- Country: Costa Rica
- Provinces: Guanacaste

Highway system
- National Road Network of Costa Rica
← Route 936	→ Route 938

National Tertiary Route 937, or just Route 937 (Spanish: Ruta Nacional Terciaria 937, or Ruta 937) is a National Road Route of Costa Rica, located in the Guanacaste province.

== Description ==
In Guanacaste province, the route covers La Cruz canton (Santa Elena district).
