= National Route 913 (Costa Rica) =

National Road Route in Costa Rica

National Tertiary Route 913
- Ruta nacional terciaria 913

Route information
- Maintained by Ministry of Public Works and Transport
- Length: 7.485 km (4.651 mi)

Location
- Country: Costa Rica
- Provinces: Guanacaste

Highway system
- National Road Network of Costa Rica
| ← Route 912 | → Route 914 |

National Tertiary Route 913, or just Route 913 (Spanish: Ruta Nacional Terciaria 913, or Ruta 913) is a National Road Route of Costa Rica, located in the Guanacaste province.

== Description ==
Route 913 is the main access to Santa Rosa National Park from Route 1.

In Guanacaste province the route covers Liberia canton (Nacascolo district) and La Cruz canton (Santa Elena district).

== Junction list ==
The route is completely within Santa Rosa National Park and within Liberia canton.

| District | km | mi | Destinations | Notes |
|---|---|---|---|---|
| Santa Elena | 0.0 | 0.0 | Route 1 | |
| Nacascolo | 7.49 | 4.65 | Hacienda Santa Rosa parking lot. | This Hacienda is where the historic Battle of Santa Rosa occurred in 1856. |
