= National Route 912 (Costa Rica) =

National Road Route in Costa Rica

National Tertiary Route 912
- Ruta nacional terciaria 912

Route information
- Maintained by Ministry of Public Works and Transport
- Length: 12.050 km (7.488 mi)

Location
- Country: Costa Rica
- Provinces: Guanacaste

Highway system
- National Road Network of Costa Rica
← Route 911	→ Route 913

National Tertiary Route 912, or just Route 912 (Spanish: Ruta Nacional Terciaria 912, or Ruta 912) is a National Road Route of Costa Rica, located in the Guanacaste province.

== Description ==
In Guanacaste province the route covers Carrillo canton (Palmira and Sardinal districts).
