= La Garita District =

District in La Cruz canton, Guanacaste province, Costa Rica

La Garita
- District
- Interactive map of La Garita
- La Garita district location in Costa Rica
- Coordinates: 11.071396°N 85.5121224°W
- Country: Costa Rica
- Province: Guanacaste
- Canton: La Cruz

Area
  - Total: 273.37 km^{2} (105.55 sq mi)
- Elevation: 300 m (980 ft)

Population (2011)
  - Total: 1,688
  - Density: 6.175/km^{2} (15.99/sq mi)
- Time zone: UTC−06:00
- Postal code: 51003

La Garita is a district of the La Cruz canton, in the Guanacaste province of Costa Rica. It is located in the north of the country, near the Nicaraguan border.

== Geography ==
La Garita has an area of 273.37 km^{2} and an elevation of 300 metres.

== Villages ==
Administrative center of the district is the village of Garita.

Other villages in the district are Agua Muerta, Andes, Asilo, Cañita, Carmen, Fortuna, Guapinol, Innocentes, Lavaderos, Pochote, San Antonio and Tapezco.

== Demographics ==
Historical population
Census	Pop.	±% p.a.
1973	1,279	—
1984	1,341	+0.43%
2000	1,581	+1.03%
2011	1,688	+0.60%
2022	2,824	+4.79%
Source: Instituto Nacional de Estadística y Censos; Centro Centroamericano de Población

For the 2011 census, La Garita had a population of 1,688 inhabitants.

== Transportation ==
=== Road transportation ===
The district is covered by the following road routes:

- National Route 4
