= National Route 914 (Costa Rica) =

National Road Route in Costa Rica

National Tertiary Route 914
- Ruta nacional terciaria 914

Route information
- Maintained by Ministry of Public Works and Transport
- Length: 12.375 km (7.689 mi)

Location
- Country: Costa Rica
- Provinces: Guanacaste

Highway system
- National Road Network of Costa Rica
← Route 913	→ Route 915

National Tertiary Route 914, or just Route 914 (Spanish: Ruta Nacional Terciaria 914, or Ruta 914), is a National Road Route of Costa Rica, located in the Guanacaste province.

== Description ==
In Guanacaste province the route covers La Cruz canton (Santa Elena district).
