= National Route 151 (Costa Rica) =

National Road Route in Costa Rica

National Secondary Route 151
- Ruta nacional secundaria 151

Route information
- Maintained by Ministry of Public Works and Transport
- Length: 14.640 km (9.097 mi)

Location
- Country: Costa Rica
- Provinces: Guanacaste

Highway system
- National Road Network of Costa Rica
← Route 150	→ Route 152

National Secondary Route 151, or just Route 151 (Spanish: Ruta Nacional Secundaria 151, or Ruta 151) is a National Road Route of Costa Rica located in the Guanacaste province.

== Description ==
In Guanacaste province the route covers Carrillo canton (Palmira, Sardinal districts).
