= National Route 938 (Costa Rica) =

National Road Route in Costa Rica

National Tertiary Route 938
- Ruta nacional terciaria 938

Route information
- Maintained by Ministry of Public Works and Transport
- Length: 10.585 km (6.577 mi)

Location
- Country: Costa Rica
- Provinces: Guanacaste

Highway system
- National Road Network of Costa Rica
← Route 937	→ Route 939

National Tertiary Route 938, or just Route 938 (Spanish: Ruta Nacional Terciaria 938, or Ruta 938) is a National Road Route of Costa Rica, located in the Guanacaste province.

== Description ==
In Guanacaste province the route covers La Cruz canton (La Cruz district).
