= La Cruz, Costa Rica =

District in La Cruz canton, Guanacaste province, Costa Rica

La Cruz
- District
- Interactive map of La Cruz
- La Cruz district location in Costa Rica
- Coordinates: 11.0845008°N 85.6435834°W
- Country: Costa Rica
- Province: Guanacaste
- Canton: La Cruz

Area
  - Total: 345.5 km^{2} (133.4 sq mi)
- Elevation: 255 m (837 ft)

Population (2011)
  - Total: 9,195
  - Density: 26.61/km^{2} (68.93/sq mi)
- Time zone: UTC−06:00
- Postal code: 51001

La Cruz is a district of the La Cruz canton in the Guanacaste province of Costa Rica. It is located in the north of the country, near the border with Nicaragua.

== Geography ==
La Cruz has an area of 345.5 km^{2} (133.4 sq mi) and an elevation of 255 metres (837 ft).

== Villages ==
Administrative center of the district is the town of La Cruz.

Other villages in the district are Bellavista, Bello Horizonte, Brisas, Cacao, Carrizal, Carrizales, Colonia Bolaños, Copalchí, Infierno, Jobo, Monte Plata, Montes de Oro, Pampa, Pegón, Peñas Blancas, Piedra Pómez, Puerto Soley, Recreo, San Buenaventura, San Dimas, San Paco, San Roque, Santa Rogelia, Santa Rosa, Soley, Sonzapote, Tempatal, and Vueltas.

== Demographics ==
Historical population
Census	Pop.	±% p.a.
1927	2,870	—
1950	3,934	+1.38%
1963	5,833	+3.08%
1973	4,283	−3.04%
1984	5,517	+2.33%
2000	7,880	+2.25%
2011	9,195	+1.41%
2022	12,439	+2.79%
Source: Instituto Nacional de Estadística y Censos; Centro Centroamericano de Población

For the 2011 census, La Cruz had a population of 9,195 inhabitants.

== Transportation ==
=== Road transportation ===
The district is covered by the following road routes:

- National Route 1
- National Route 4
- National Route 935
- National Route 938
- National Route 939
