= Cañas Dulces District =

District in Liberia canton, Guanacaste province, Costa Rica

Cañas Dulces
- District
- Interactive map of Cañas Dulces
- Cañas Dulces district location in Costa Rica
- Coordinates: 10.7460328°N 85.456516°W
- Country: Costa Rica
- Province: Guanacaste
- Canton: Liberia

Area
  - Total: 243.39 km^{2} (93.97 sq mi)
- Elevation: 105 m (344 ft)

Population (2011)
  - Total: 3,230
  - Density: 13.3/km^{2} (34.4/sq mi)
- Time zone: UTC−06:00
- Postal code: 50102

Cañas Dulces is a district of the Liberia canton, in the Guanacaste province of Costa Rica.

The administrative center of Cañas Dulces District is the village of Cañas Dulces. The district has a population of about 3500 people. Cañas Dulces is near Rincón de la Vieja Volcano National Park and the Rincón de la Vieja Volcano.

== Wildlife ==
Wildlife in Cañas Dulces includes monkeys such as the mantled howler, as well as the white-headed capuchin and Geoffroy's spider monkey, and birds such as the keel-billed toucan.

== Geography ==
Cañas Dulces has an area of 243.39 km^{2} (93.97 sq mi) and an elevation of 105 metres.

== Demographics ==
Historical population
Census	Pop.	±% p.a.
1883	662	—
1892	798	+2.10%
1927	1,291	+1.38%
1950	1,715	+1.24%
1963	1,980	+1.11%
1973	2,138	+0.77%
1984	2,253	+0.48%
2000	2,634	+0.98%
2011	3,230	+1.87%
2022	4,487	+3.03%
Source: Instituto Nacional de Estadística y Censos; Centro Centroamericano de Población

For the 2011 census, Cañas Dulces had a population of 3,230 inhabitants.

== Transportation ==
=== Road transportation ===
The district is covered by the following road routes:

- National Route 1
