= Liberia (canton) =

Canton in Guanacaste province, Costa Rica

- Canton
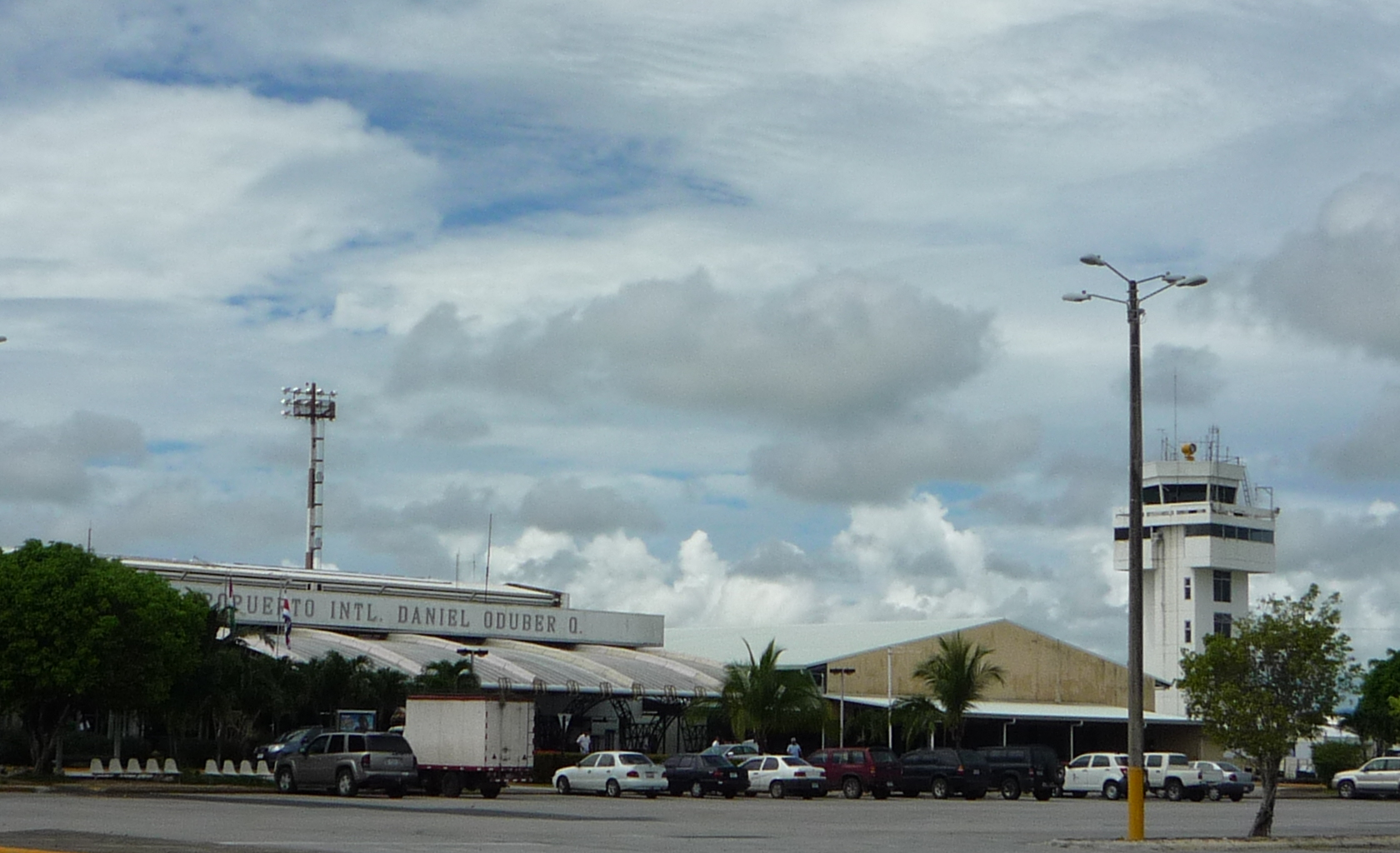
- Daniel Oduber Quirós International Airport

- Flag
- Interactive map of Liberia
- Liberia canton location in Costa Rica
- Coordinates: 10.6916272°N 85.4956835°W
- Country: Costa Rica
- Province: Guanacaste
- Creation: 7 December 1848
- Head city: Liberia
- Districts: Districts: Liberia; Cañas Dulces; Mayorga; Nacascolo; Curubandé

Government
  - Type: Municipality
  - Body: Municipalidad de Liberia

Area
  - Total: 1,436.47 km^{2} (554.62 sq mi)
- Elevation: 193 m (633 ft)

Population (2011)
  - Total: 62,987
  - Density: 43.848/km^{2} (113.57/sq mi)
- Time zone: UTC−06:00
- Canton code: 501
- Website: www.muniliberia.go.cr/muni/

Liberia is a canton in the Guanacaste province of Costa Rica. The head city is in Liberia district.

== History ==
Liberia was created on 7 December 1848 by decree 167.

== Geography ==
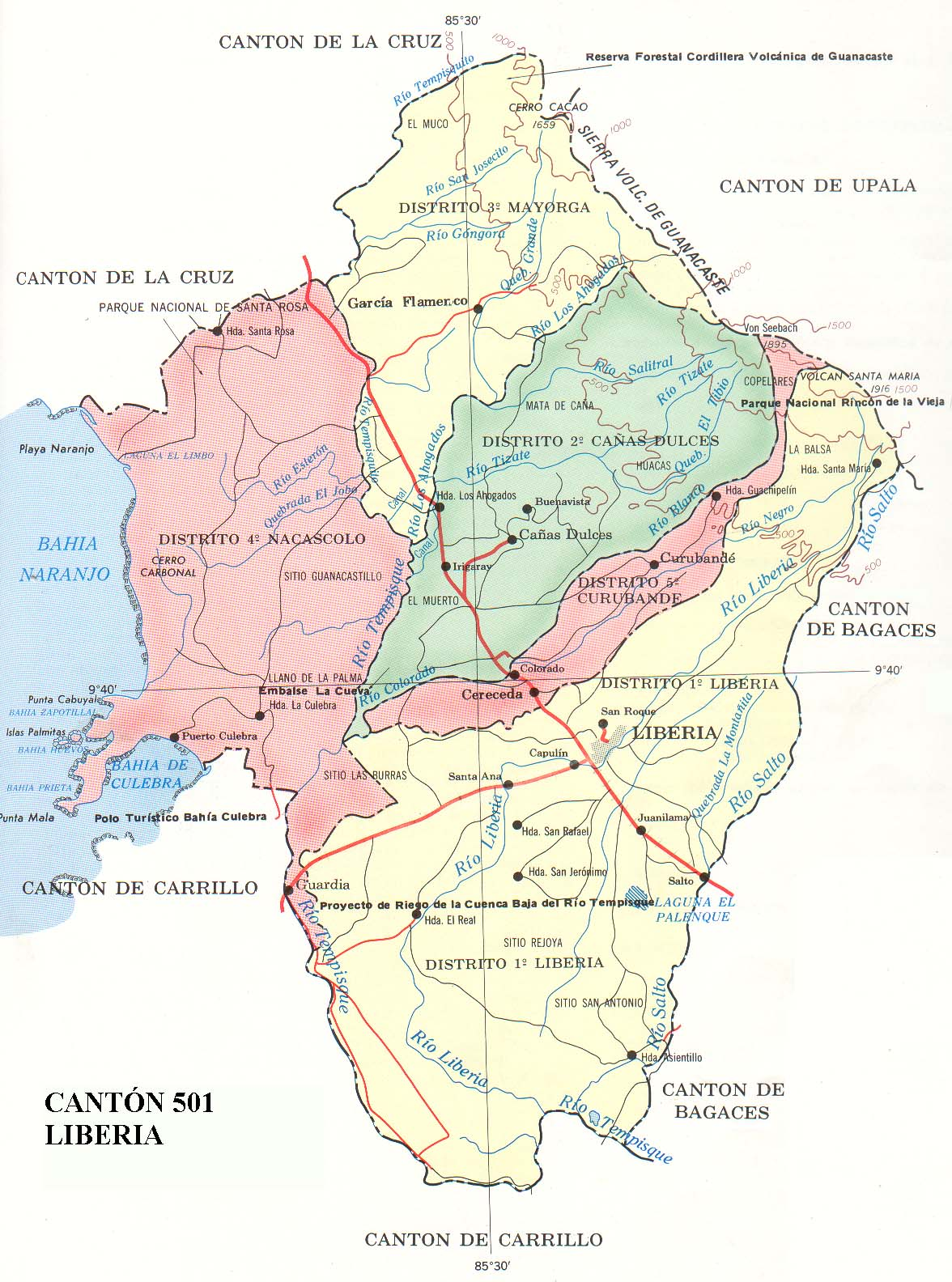
Map of Liberia canton

Liberia has an area of 1,436.47 km^{2} and a mean elevation of 193 metres. Prominent geologic features of Liberia include Cerro Cacao (Cacao Mountain) and Rincón de la Vieja. The latter is the center of the Rincón de la Vieja Volcano National Park. The canton also includes the most visited portion of Santa Rosa National Park on its northwest border. The Río Salto delineates the southwestern border as far as the Tempisque River, and the Tempisque forms the border on the southeast as far as the Bahía Naranjo (Orange Bay).

== Districts ==
The canton of Liberia is subdivided into the following districts:

1. Liberia
2. Cañas Dulces
3. Mayorga
4. Nacascolo
5. Curubandé

== Demographics ==
Historical population
Census	Pop.	±% p.a.
1864	3,169	—
1883	4,744	+2.15%
1892	5,883	+2.42%
1927	7,322	+0.63%
1950	10,246	+1.47%
1963	18,030	+4.44%
1973	21,781	+1.91%
1984	28,067	+2.33%
2000	46,703	+3.23%
2011	62,987	+2.76%
2022	80,130	+2.21%
Source: Instituto Nacional de Estadística y Censos; Centro Centroamericano de Población

For the 2011 census, Liberia had a population of 62,987 inhabitants. Besides hosting the provincial capital, Liberia Canton is the most populous of Guanacaste's nine cantons.

== Transportation ==
=== Road transportation ===
The canton is covered by the following road routes:

- National Route 1
- National Route 21
- National Route 253
- National Route 913
- National Route 917
- National Route 918

=== Airports ===
- Daniel Oduber Quirós International Airport is located in this canton.
