= Indigenous peoples of Costa Rica =

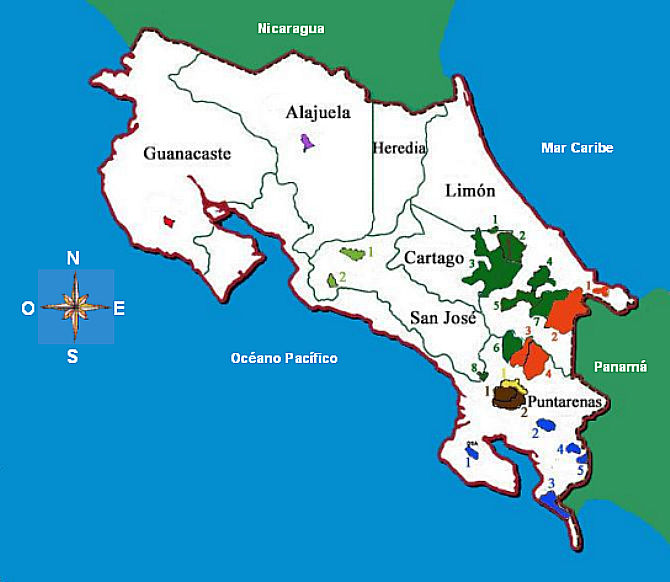
- Indigenous territories in Costa Rica

Total population
- 114,000; 2.4% of Costa Rica's population

Regions with significant populations
- Costa Rica

Languages
- Bribri, Cabecar, Ngäbe, Maleku, Brunca, Terraba, Spanish (Chorotega and Huetar are extinct)

Religion
- Christianity and Native American religions

Related ethnic groups
- Other Indigenous peoples of the Americas

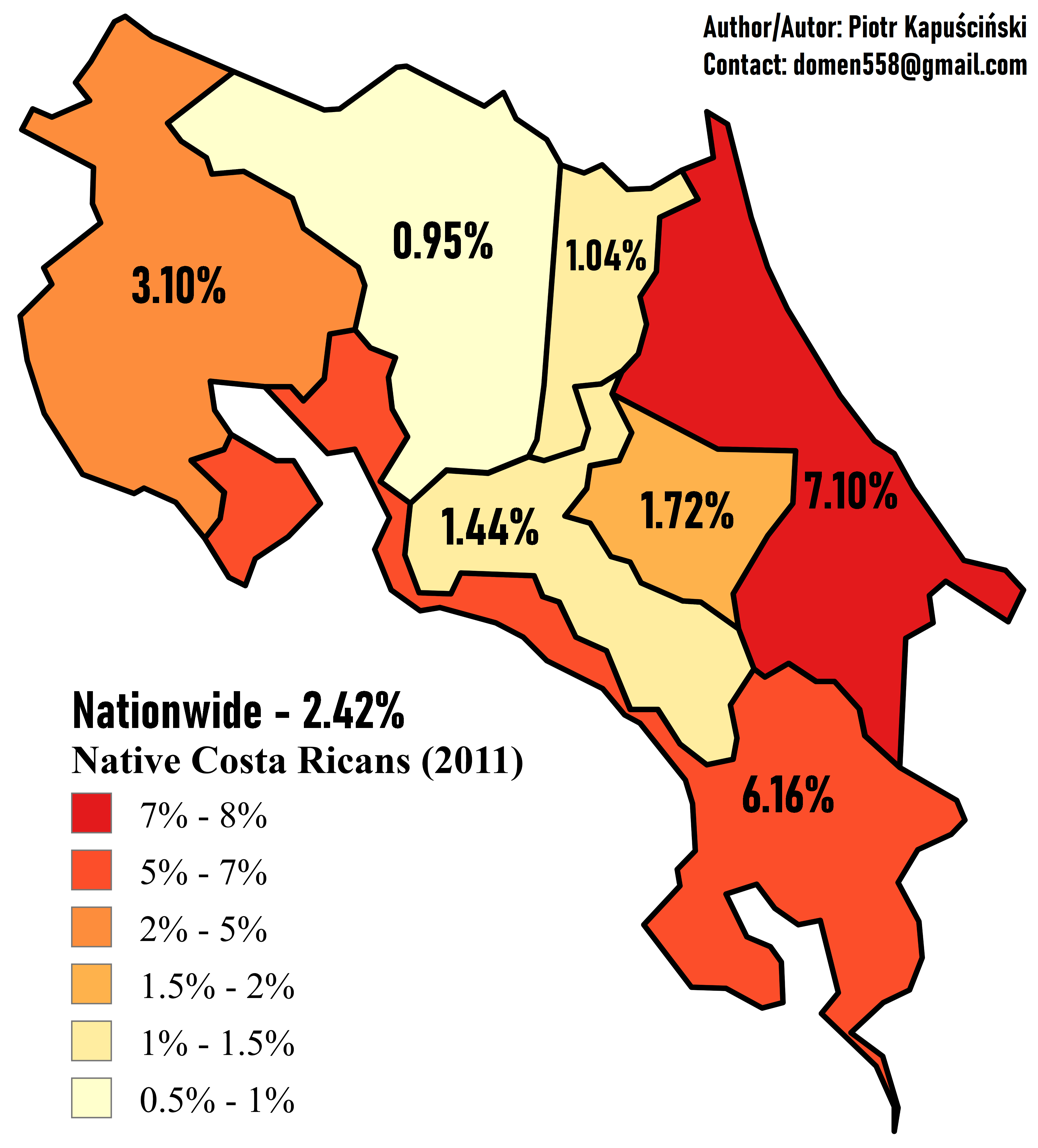
Distribution of Native Costa Ricans according to the 2011 census

Indigenous people of Costa Rica, or Native Costa Ricans, are the people who lived in what is now Costa Rica prior to European and African contact and the descendants of those peoples. About 114,000 Indigenous people live in the country, comprising 2.4% of the total population. Indigenous Costa Ricans strive to keep their cultural traditions and languages alive.

In 1977, the government passed the Indigenous Law, which created reserves. There are a total of 24 Indigenous territories located throughout Costa Rica. After only gaining the right to vote in 1994, they are still fighting for their rights, particularly regarding the government taking over their land and ignoring the articles which protect them. While Indigenous people have struggled for legal recognition of their rights, Costa Rica did sign the UN Declaration on the Rights of Indigenous Peoples in 2007.

Indigenous Costa Ricans belong to eight major ethnic groups. Some groups are:

- Bribris (the most populous), they are located in Talamanca and Salitre.
- Cabecars, like the Bribris, are located in Talamanca, but are also located in Bajo Chirripó and Ujarrás.
- Ngäbes or Guaymís are located in Coto Brus zone, but they have presence in Sixaola.
- Chorotegas are located in the Guanacaste province. Their language is extinct.
- Huetars are located in the Central Valley of Costa Rica. Like Chorotegas, their language is extinct.
- Borucas or Bruncas are located in Boruca and Buenos Aires.
- Terrabas, also as Borucas, they are located in Buenos Aires (specifically in San Francisco).
- Malekus or Malecus, they are located in the Guatuso Indigenous reserve.

== History ==
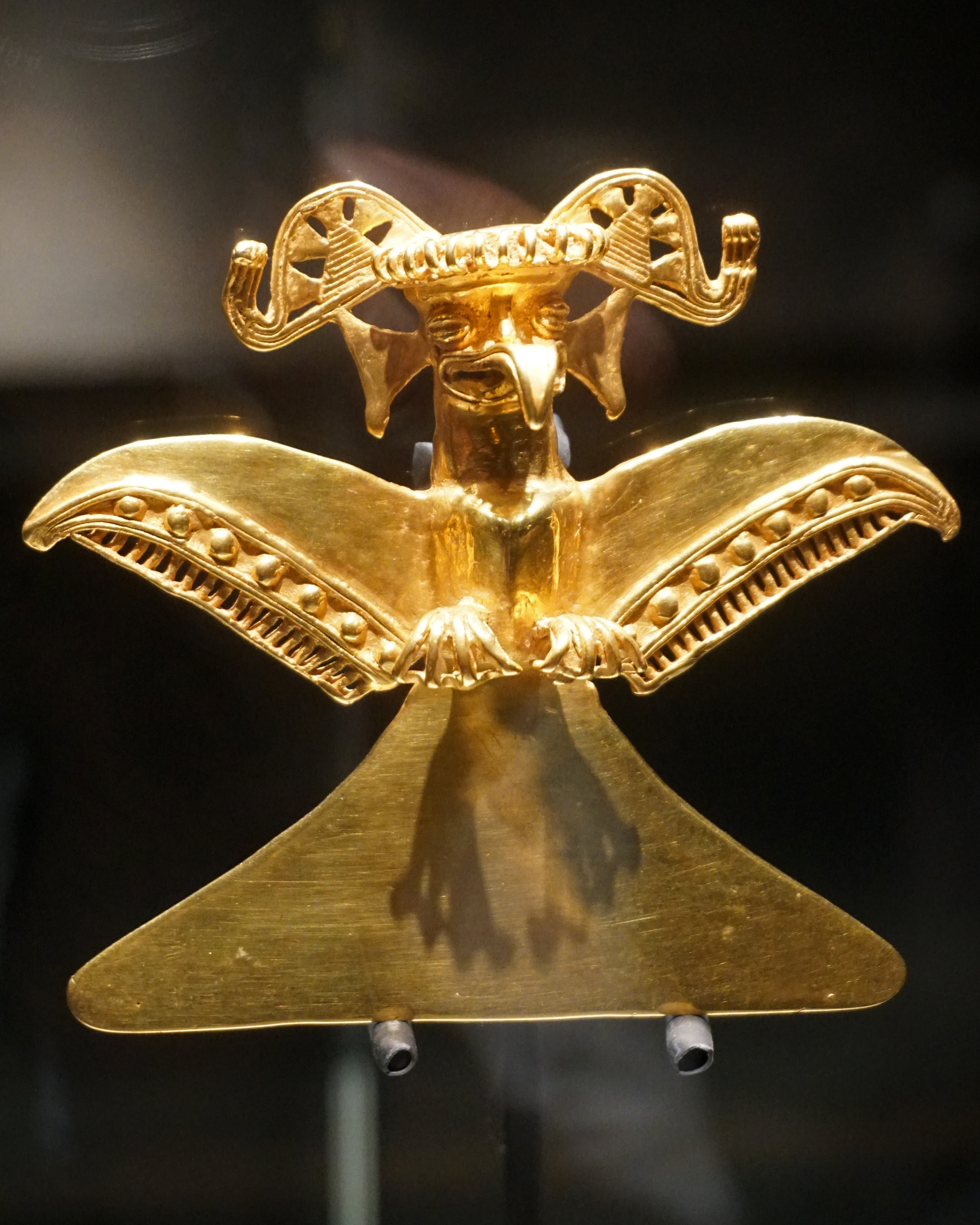
Pre-Columbian harpy eagle gold pendant, Museo del Oro Precolombino

The first Indigenous peoples of present-day Costa Rica were hunters and gatherers, and the territory was divided in two cultural areas due to its geographical location in the Intermediate Area, between the Mesoamerican and the Andean cultural regions. Its Indigenous peoples have lived in Costa Rica for what stretches back to at least 10,000 years before the arrival of the Spaniards.

The northwest of the country, the Nicoya Peninsula, was the southernmost point of Mesoamerican cultural influence when the Spanish conquerors came in the sixteenth century. The Nicoya culture was the largest cacicazgo on the Pacific coast of Costa Rica. The central and southern portions of the country belonged to the Isthmo-Colombian cultural area with strong Muisca influences, as they were part of territories occupied predominantly by speakers of the Chibchan languages. The Diquis culture flourished from 700 CE to 1530 CE.

Christopher Columbus arrived in Costa Rica in 1502 on his last trip to the Americas. Costa Rica received its name from Gil Gonzalez Dávila when he arrived and thought he found the most gold he had ever seen; therefore naming it the "Rich Coast". To the Spaniards, it was less organized from other Indigenous groups they had discovered, mainly because they lived in separate groups rather than one large group. During the colonization, Costa Rica was very poor, mainly because it was isolated from the majority of colonies of the Spanish Empire. The initial colonies that were set up were unsuccessful because of disease, as well as the weather of the tropical rain forests. Costa Rica did not become a province of Spain until the 1560s, when a community was created that used the volcanic soil for agricultural purposes. By the time that Columbus arrived, there were about 20,000 Costa Rican natives, but this number greatly declined. That was primarily due to disease, particularly smallpox as well as the fact that many Indigenous people were enslaved to work and oftentimes escaped from them.

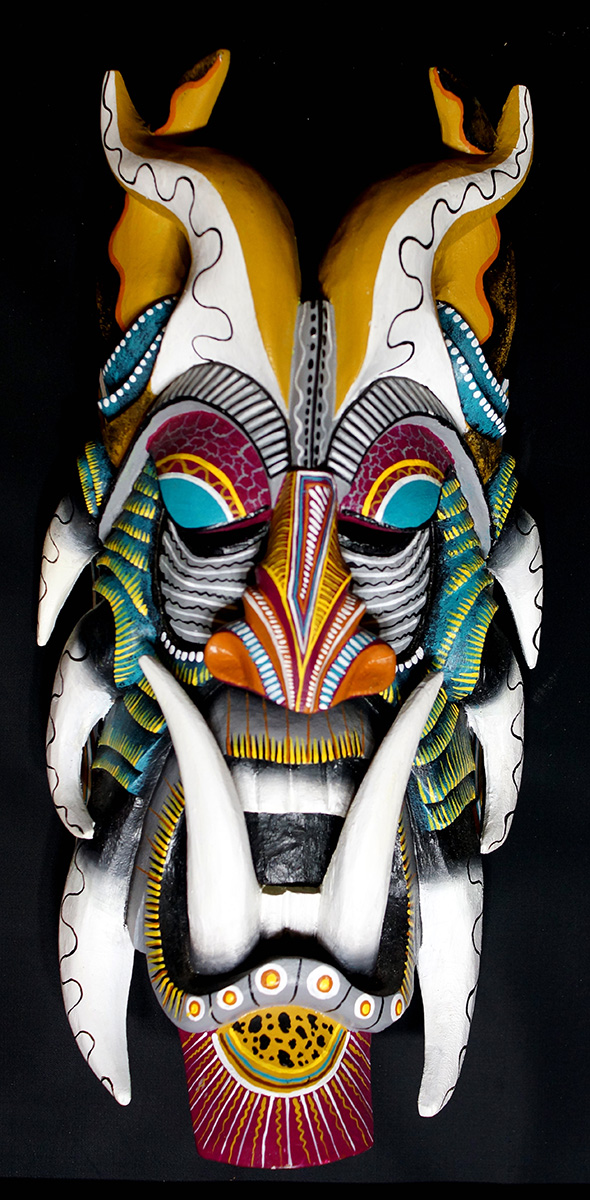
The Boruca are known for their traditional masks

=== Boruca, southern Costa Rica ===
About 2,660 people are in the Boruca tribe. They live in the Puntarenas area of Costa Rica on one of the first reservations that was established for Indigenous Costa Ricans. They are popular for their crafts, particularly masks made for the "Fiesta de los Diablos" which is a three-day festival that stages fights between the Boruca people (depicted as devils) and the Spanish conquistadors (portrayed as Bulls).

=== Bribri, southern Atlantic coast ===
The Bribri are an Indigenous tribe that lives in Salitre, Cabagra, Tal, Awari and Ujarrás. They are a voting majority in the Puerto Viejo de Talamanca area. The range of the population stretches from 11,000 to 35,000. The Bribri have a specific social structure that is organized in clans. Each clan is composed of an extended family. Women have a higher status in this society, because their children's clans are determined by whichever clan they come from. Women in the Bribri society are the only ones that can inherit land and prepare the sacred cacao drink used during the rituals. Men's roles are defined by their clan, and often are exclusive for men. The spiritual leader, or "awa" is very important to the Bribis, which men may have the opportunity to become. Just as it is important to many other Indigenous groups in Costa Rica, Cacao holds a particular significance for the Bribri. They believe that the cacao tree used to be a woman and the god Sibú turned her into a tree. Only women may prepare the drink. There are many associations that produce handmade chocolate which help these women.

=== Cabécar, Cordillera de Talamanca ===
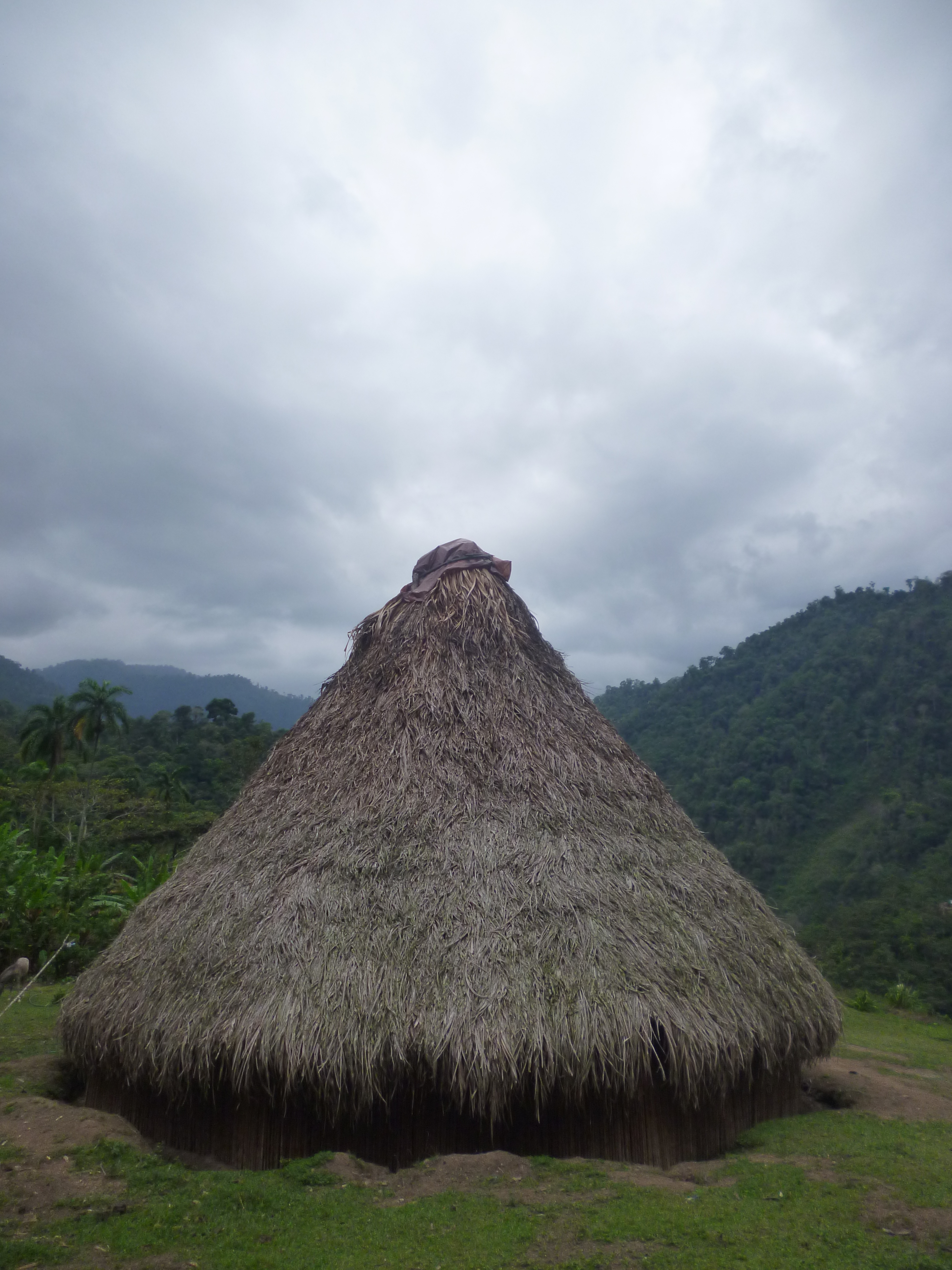
Cabécar traditional house

The Cabécar are the largest Indigenous group in Costa Rica and are considered to be the most isolated. They have been pushed up to the Chirripo Mountains, which requires a few hours long hike to reach. Therefore, the Cabécar have not been exposed to many basic items, and few of them have been exposed to education. They are very traditional and have preserved their culture. They speak mostly their own language rather than Spanish.

=== Guaymí, southern Costa Rica, along the Panamá border ===
The Guaymís, also known as the Ngabe are the group of the most people in Costa Rica. They emigrated from Panama to Costa Rica in the 1960s. Their main source of income is based on agriculture where they grow bananas, rice, corn, beans and more.

=== Huetar, Quitirrisí ===
The Quitirrisi are located in Ciudad Colon and Puriscal in the Central Valley. They are known for handwoven baskets and straw hats.

=== Maleku, northern Alajuela ===
The Maleku are an Indigenous group of about 600 people located in the San Rafael de Guatuso Indigenous Reserve. Before the Spanish colonization, their territory extended as far west as Rincon de la Vieja, and included the volcano Arenal to the south and Rio Celeste as sacred sites. Today their reserve is located about an hour north of La Fortuna. Although their land was much larger prior to colonization, they are now working on buying their own land back from the government. Their economy is based on Indigenous art and many tourists are welcome to watch them perform musical pieces in nearby La Fortuna. This reservation is in great danger and the Maleku no longer live in their traditional houses as the trees are also endangered. They are working hard to protect their language, as there are only about 300 speakers of it.

=== Matambú or Chorotega, Guanacaste ===
The Matambú, also known as the Chorotega are located in Guanacaste. The Chorotegas translates to "The Fleeing People", as they fled to Costa Rica in AD 500 to escape slavery in Southern Mexico. They are related to Maya people. Parts of their Mexican culture is evident in regards to their language and rituals, including human sacrifices. They are known as being the most powerful group of peoples during the conquest of the Spanish, as they were an organized military group and fought against the Spanish. There is evidence that they were a democracy and elected Caciques, or priests to be the leaders, and also that they were a hierarchical group. They are known for their agriculture, producing primarily corn and their ceramics/pottery today.

=== Térraba or Teribe, also called Naso, southern Costa Rica ===
There are about 3,305 Térraba people. As of 2007, the regional poverty rate was 19.3% while for the whole country it was about 3.3%. It is so high, because their forest land has been cleared over the years, which was used for their agriculture and predominant economy. They have not preserved their language as much, as mainly only the elders speak it. However, another, larger group of Teribe in Panama do use the language and the two groups are in contact. A larger group from the tribe living in Panama does use the language and there are visits between the two groups.

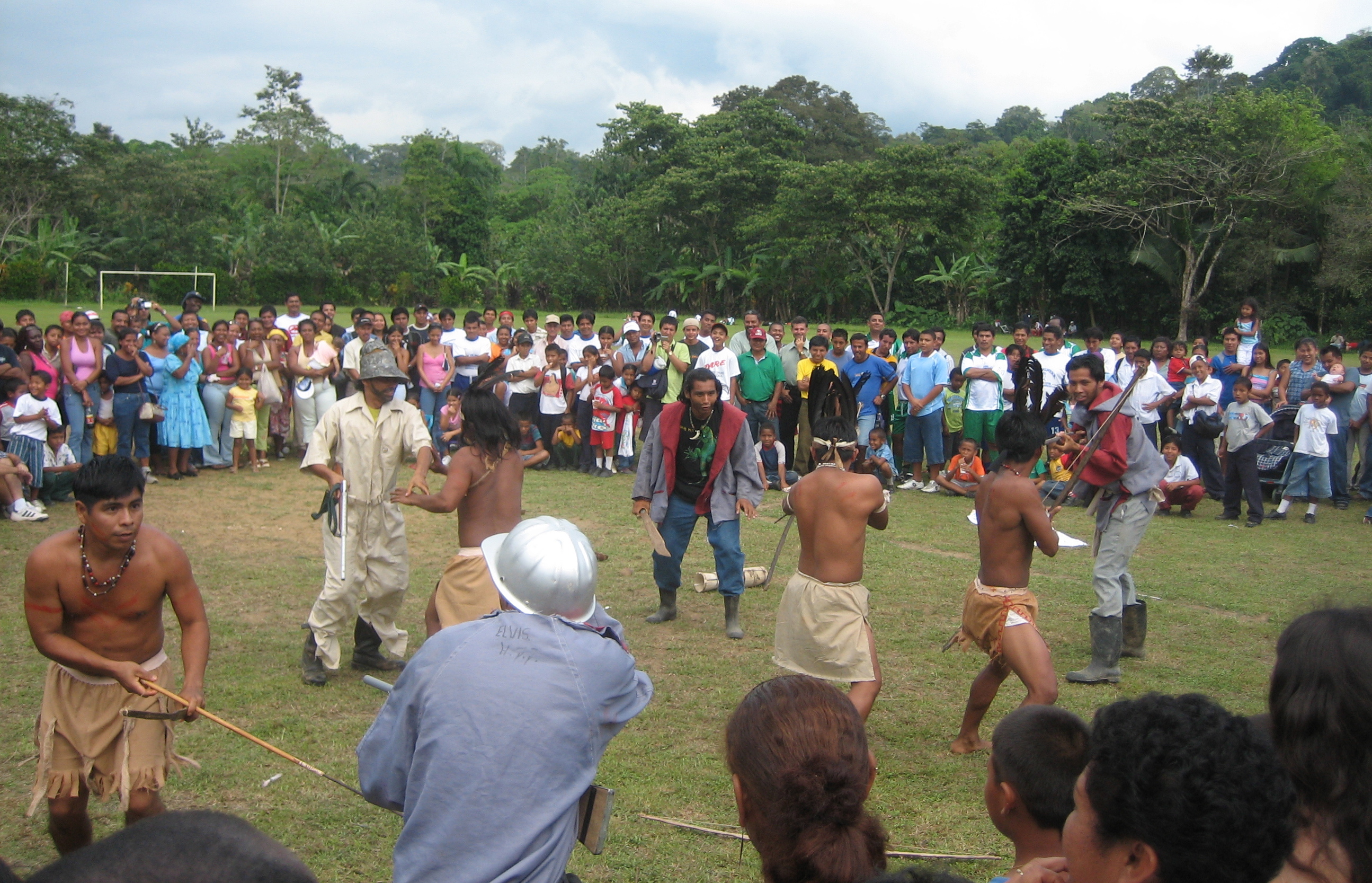
"Día del Indígena" celebration in Rancho Grande, Talamanca, Limón Province. Re-enactment of the Spanish arrival and Indigenous resistance.

== Current issues ==
=== Education ===
There is a conflict over Indigenous teachers and students are not receiving the same opportunities as the non-Indigenous peoples. There were two cases in Boruca and Teribe in which qualified Indigenous teachers were not given jobs in the local schools. There is also the fact that the schools which the Indigenous attend are not funded properly, and the students aren't given the same resources to learn. As for the universities, the Indigenous are fighting to gain qualifications so that they can earn higher paying jobs.

=== Land issues ===
Of Costa Rica's 50,900 km^{2} area of land, 3,344 or 5.9% of the land is labeled as Indigenous territories. The major issues facing the Indigenous groups of Costa Rica today mainly relate to land. The farmers and ranchers are not in charge of their own land that they work because they are considered to be on a reserve or because their land is in danger due to mining and oil work being done.

Indigenous peoples oppose the current El Diquís Hydroelectric Project that will flood some of the lands and affect many of the other groups. It will affect seven of the Indigenous territories, including Bribi, Cabecar, Teribe, and Brunka. This will be the largest hydro-electric dam in Central America and will cut through nearly 200 historical sites and sacred grounds.

=== Healthcare ===
Indigenous peoples of Costa Rica often do not receive adequate healthcare services due to lack of access: they are situated in difficult terrain, particularly in the mountains. Only about 26% of the Indigenous population have access to clean water. Therefore, the Indigenous peoples tend to rely on traditional medicinal practices. Groups like CONAI (National Commission for Indigenous Affairs), working to improve socioeconomic situations of the Indigenous peoples, have tried to integrate the two medicinal practices. This has been unsuccessful, as it resulted in bias and little acknowledgment of the Indigenous traditional ways. Some areas have built clinics, but doctors are available only two days of the week.

== See also ==
- Chibchan languages
- Pre-Columbian history of Costa Rica
- Intermediate Area
- Mesoamerica
- Isthmo-Colombian Area
