= Talamanca Bribri =

Bribri Talamanca
- Indigenous Territory
- Location within Costa Rica
- Coordinates: 9.574°N 82.938°W
- Country: Costa Rica
- Province: Limón
- Established: 1985

Area
  - Total: 43,690 ha (108,000 acres)

Population
  - Total: 6,458

The Bribri Talamanca Indigenous Territory is one of the four Costa Rican Indigenous territories of the Bribri ethnic group. It borders the Talamanca Cabecar Indigenous Territory. It was created by decree in 1985 and is located in the canton of Talamanca, Limón Province. It covers an approximate area of 43,690 hectares of a predominantly mountainous area.

== Populated ==
It covers the communities of Chasse, Bamboo, Watsi, La Pera, Meleruk, Suretka, Shiroles, Sepecue, Mojoncito, Bajo Coen, Alto Coen, Coroma, Amubri, Soki, Kachabri, Suiri, Katsi, Dururpe, Namu Woki, Boca Uren, Alto Uren Alto Lari, Duriñak, Yorkin, Shuabb and Ak Bërie. It is managed by the Association of Integral Development of the Bribri Indigenous Territory (ADITIBRI) which in turn is organized in different Neighborhood Councils of the different communities. The economy is based on the cultivation of bananas, plantains, cocoa, roots, tubers, corn and fruit trees.

== Features ==
The indigenous Bribri population constitutes one of the most numerous groups in Costa Rica, with approximately 10,000 Bribri across the country. They are also located in the Salitre and Cabagra Indigenous Reserves in the Province of Puntarenas and in the Kéköldi Indigenous Reserve. They retain their Bribri language (written and oral) and are engaged in agriculture, fishing, bird hunting and pig farming. Among the handmade products they make is basketry and the manufacture of musical instruments, for which they use natural elements.

They move through boats and rafts in the Sixaola riverbed, on the border with Panama. The indigenous population of Talamanca is part of the indigenous cultures of the Amazon. Its social system in the pre-Columbian era was based on the cacicazgo, where a chief or cacique was appointed who made the decisions of the tribe.

The Bribri de Talamanca Reserve has 6,458 inhabitants in the Sixaola river basin, with the following settlements: Sipurio, Suretka, Amubre, Sepecue (Coen), Shiroles, Bris, Katsi, Atalanta, Urén, Coroma, Yorkín (Soró Kichá), Vesta, Chase, Talía, Paraíso, Costa Rica (Sixaola), Piedra Grande, Volio (Watsi), Fields, Telire, Bordon, Concepcion de Atalanta, Akberie (Piedra Grande), Bratsi, Mojoncito, Shiroles, and Lari.
