= Cockle =

Cockle may refer to:

- Cockle (bivalve), an edible, marine bivalve mollusc
- Lolium temulentum (also cockle), an annual plant of the family Poaceae
- Berwick cockle, a white-coloured sweet with red stripes
- Cockle, a codename for the folding kayaks used in World War II
- Cockles (TV series), a 1984 British television series
- Cockles (as in "warm the cockles of someone's heart"), the ventricles of the heart

== People with the surname ==
- Doug Cockle (born 1970), American actor and director
- Dudley Cockle (1907–1986), English cricketer and Royal Air Force airman
- Jackie Cockle (born 1950), British animation specialist
- James Cockle (1819–1895), English lawyer and mathematician
- John Cockle (1908–1966), Australian politician

== See also ==
- Cockle Bay (disambiguation)
- Cockle Creek (disambiguation)
- Cockleshell (disambiguation)
- Cocles (disambiguation)
- Cockley (disambiguation)
- Cocklebur
