= Agriculture in Costa Rica =

Costa Rican agriculture plays a profound part in the country's gross domestic product (GDP). It makes up about 6.5% of Costa Rica's GDP, and 14% of the labor force. Depending upon location and altitude, many regions differ in agricultural crops and techniques. The main exports include bananas, pineapples, coffee, sugar, rice, vegetables, tropical fruits, ornamental plants, corn, potatoes and palm oil.

Almost 10% of Costa Rica's land use is devoted to agriculture. 21% of its land is irrigated mainly with surface water. Development and economic growth within the country is due to hastened agricultural-export production. Costa Rican farmers and multinational corporations within Costa Rica practice two primary methods of farming: plantation agriculture, which includes practices by global companies such as Dole, Chiquita, Del Monte, and sustainable agriculture/permaculture. There are also numerous indigenous communities that practice subsistence farming techniques.

== Climate ==
According to the Koppen Climate classification, Costa Rica is considered a tropical-mesothermal climate. The country lies at 10° 0' 0" N / 84° 0' 0" W, causing year-round tropical weather. Average yearly rainfall varies greatly depending on location and altitude. For example, the lowlands generally have more of a dry climate than the highlands, which is generally a misty-foggy climate throughout the year.

Costa Rica has two seasons: a dry season, which is called verano (which translates to summer) and a rainy season, which Costa Ricans call invierno (meaning winter). The dry season begins in December and ends in May, while the rainy season runs from May to November. Costa Rica has a very tropical climate.

== History ==
The history of Costa Rica dates back about 3,000 years. Archeological evidence indicates that people were living and growing maize during the time of the Curré archaeological phase (1500–300 BC). Fluctuations in pollen types and profusion of charcoal suggest that the intensity of human impact varied over this period.

The country's name 'Costa Rica' translates to 'Rich Coast' because the first settlers to come across the country (Christopher Columbus; although the country was inhabited by indigenous well before) believed it to hold quantities of gold based on observations of indigenous inhabitants. The rolling mountains and dense jungles were full of biologic diversity but eventually the original belief that Costa Rica was a gold rich country was proved to be wrong.

During the 19th century, coffee and banana cultivation brought some wealth to Costa Rica which resulted in class differentiation. The economy of Costa Rica was considered impoverished until the introduction of coffee in the 1820s. Small farmers were important in the production of coffee but even then wealth from the cash crop was in the hands of the elite.

The Great Banana Strike of 1934, against the United Fruit Company was an important step which eventually led to the formation of effective trade unions in Costa Rica, since the company was required to sign a collective agreement with its workers in 1938.

== Major agricultural products ==
The UN Food and Agriculture Organization has compiled the statistics which follow:

| Rank | Commodity | Production ( $1000) | Production (Mt) |
|---|---|---|---|
| 1 | Bananas | 652108 | 2365470 |
| 2 | Pineapples | 533070 | 1870120 |
| 3 | Cow milk, whole, fresh | 286053 | 916657 |
| 4 | Indigenous cattle meat | 251409 | 93067 |
| 5 | Indigenous chicken meat | 141146 | 99091 |
| 6 | Sugar cane | 133433 | 4100000 |
| 8 | Fruit, Fresh | 89112 | 255310 |
| 9 | Indigenous Pigmeat | 82997 | 53991 |
| 10 | Palm oil | 82990 | 190757 11 70233 |
| 11 | Rice, paddy | 70233 | 256460 |
| 12 | Oranges | 67640 | 350000 13 |
| 13 | Cassava | 47186 | 451700 |
| 14 | Hen eggs | | |
| 15 | Other melons (inc. cantaloupes) | 34485 | 187325 |
| 16 | Mangoes, mangosteens, guavas | 29958 | 50000 |
| 17 | Papayas | 17499 | 61657 |
| 18 | Tomatoes | 16881 | 45679 |
| 19 | Avocados | 16142 | 23294 |
| 20 | Palm kernels | 13164 | 51000 |

In 2018, Costa Rica produced 3.4 million tons of pineapple (it's the largest producer in the world). In the same year, the country produced 4.4 million tons of sugarcane, 2.5 million tons of banana and 1 million tons of palm oil, these being its main cultures. In addition, it produced 236 thousand tons of orange, 159 thousand tons of cassava, 158 thousand tons of rice, 143 thousand tons of melon, in addition to smaller productions of other agricultural products such as coffee, papaya, potato, tomato etc.

== Methods ==
=== Industrial agriculture ===
The primary aspect of large-scale or plantation agriculture is to produce very large quantities of agricultural goods. This type of agriculture facilitates economies of scale. The more goods produced at such rapid rates, the less expensive the companies have to sell their products for, making them leaders in the world market. For the most part, plantations in Costa Rica are monocultures. These plantations (e.g. Dole, Del Monte, Chiquita) primarily grow bananas, pineapples, sugar, coffee, and ornamental plants. Many crops cultivated through plantation farming are usually genetically modified to improve and hasten growth and increase resistance to pests and diseases.

This type of agriculture requires altering and changing much of the landscape. Large sectors of forest are demolished to make way for huge high-yield corporate agricultural fields, which has a major influence on surrounding ecosystems. Many of the methods practiced within these monocultures cause considerable effects on surrounding biodiversity and human communities. These agricultural fields are one of the primary causes of deforestation in Costa Rica.

The clearing of forests makes more land open for plantations to harvest mass quantities of crops. Many plants, insects, amphibians, reptiles, birds, and mammal populations are drastically declining. As a result of the heavy use of pesticides used in plantation farming and many domestic flora and fauna are dying off, while some pests, such as the very venomous Fer de lance snake are rapidly multiplying. This is due to the fact that because so much land is cleared the snake species can capture its prey with much more ease, as there is less to hide behind. This along with deforestation then affects the country's biodiversity, which (for a country that is about the size of West Virginia) accounts for 5% of the world's biodiversity.

With such large areas of land to farm, this method of primarily monoculture farming requires the use of heavy machinery. This type of farming is also the cause of much of the country's greenhouse gas emissions. But what makes Costa Rica's food system really unsustainable is the globalized commodity trade that has resulted in the integration of the food supply chain and its concentration in only a few transnational corporations. This greatly increases the carbon footprint and energy intensity of the food consumption, and at tremendous social and other environmental costs.

Numerous studies have been implemented globally to determine the effects of various farming methods. Studies have reported that the energy use in conventional farming systems is 200 percent higher than that of more sustainable systems. Research showed that while organic farming typically uses more machine hours than conventional farming, total energy consumption was still a great deal higher in conventional systems because, aside from machine use on the actual farm, energy is used in the production of pesticides and other inorganic farming products.

==== Effects on surrounding human communities ====
Conventional agriculture has put pressure on indigenous customs and traditions. The use of pesticides in Costa Rican agricultural fields has nearly doubled over the past two decades. Currently Costa Rica ranks first in world pesticide use. Plantation agriculture was a significant contributor to the runoff and other environmental effects caused by the pesticides because over a third of these agrochemicals are used on banana and plantain production. The use of intensive agrochemicals on large plantations make cash crop production to be the most harmful to the surrounding area. Indigenous tribes lack legislation that would limit agrochemicals, so much of the runoff affects the rivers used by the Bribri and other indigenous tribes inhabiting Costa Rica.

==== Effects on biodiversity ====
Costa Rica's rainforests house 5% of the world's biodiversity and 26% of them are protected in some way. The advent of genetically modified organisms has become an enormous industry because of the fragile nature of monoculture agribusiness of the United States and conventional plantations the Europeans introduced to Costa Rica. When hundreds of acres are deforested and covered with only one type of one plant, the farmer has elevated the potential for blights, insect infestations, and other disturbances to be disastrous. Nature knows that a diverse community of species not only act as biological controls for each other, but also stabilize the entire area because only some species will be affected by disturbances. Plantation agriculture taken the homes of many biota causing a huge shift in species diversity. One of the most venomous snakes in Costa Rica, the fer de lance, has actually benefited from this type of agriculture. As land is cleared for agro fields, their prey has fewer places to hide, causing a substantial ease in their hunt. Before plantations began to deforesting, fer de lance survival rate was only about 2%. Today, with increasing rates of deforestation and plantation agriculture their survival rate is somewhere between 60 and 70%.

=== Permaculture or sustainable farming ===
Smaller-scale, sustainable agricultural methods are becoming increasingly popular throughout Costa Rica. With the country's declaration to become the first carbon-neutral country by 2021, this is their first step in attaining such a goal. Crop rotation is one of the practices executed by sustainable farmers in Costa Rica. Since many plants are planted together, one major benefit of crop rotation is that each crop has a different harvesting period providing food and income year-round. This method also reduces soil erosion, a major environmental issue in Costa Rica. Instead of using chemicals to prevent pests many of these farmers harvest plants such as lemongrass and citrosa, natural pest repellents. The use of crop rotation, and seasonally changing crops also deters pests that feed on particular individual types crops since that crop is only around for a short period of time. Companion planting is another method employed by sustainable farmers in Costa Rica. For example, planting mint around vegetables helps deter many pests as the aroma is unappealing to them. Planting rue helps in deterring the Japanese beetle, a major agricultural pest. A newer technology method that sustainable farmers in Costa Rica are beginning to employ is the use of plug-flow anaerobic digesters. These machines are "long, narrow, insulated, and heated tanks made of reinforced concrete, steel or fiberglass with a gas tight cover to capture the biogas. It is loaded with thick manure of 20-30 percent total solids. When the manure reaches the outlet it discharges over an outlet weir arranged to maintain a gas tight atmosphere but still allow the effluent to flow out. Biogas produced by the digester is used to heat the digester to the desired temperature. Excess biogas can be used to run an engine generator. Heat can also be recovered from the engine generator and used for space or floor heating, water heating or steam production to offset the cost of purchased electricity, propane, natural gas or gas oil used on the farm for daily operations".

Leftover manure is then mixed with soil and added to the cropland. Around 18 percent of all greenhouse gas admissions can be attributed to animal agriculture today, therefore employing plug-flow digesters is another step Costa Rican sustainable farmers are taking to reduce greenhouse gas admissions. With more sustainable farming methods employed in Costa Rica, less energy is generally required from the farmer because the agriculture system sustains itself.

== Subsistence farming ==
This type of farming is practiced predominately by the indigenous tribes in Costa Rica. The main activity of the BriBri tribe is agriculture. The Limon region (82.8° – 83.3°W, 9.6°- 9.3°N) is one of the main regions where indigenous farmers practice subsistence agroforestry. These tribes rely on natural growth within the forest as well as small sustainable gardens to produce enough food for a clan to survive on. The Bribri tribe of Talamanca reside in the Puerto Limon region and cultivate more than 120 wild and domestic crop species, providing provisions, building materials, medicine, and trade items for the people.

Any food or resources left over are quickly traded for other commodities the clan cannot produce for themselves (i.e. medicine, food, clothes, etc.). BriBri Indians implement different agricultural techniques to maintain and enrich their native traditions. Agroforestry, an interactive practice of positioning forest flora amongst crops that have mutualistic relationships is one of these traditions. "They use natural nutrient cycling and symbiotic relationships between plants, insects, birds, bats, and other animals to provide natural mechanisms for pest control, incorporate soil rejuvenating legume trees, and produce relay harvests throughout the year". Some other practices these subsistence farmers adhere to include: maintaining their natural resource base, manage pests and diseases through internal regulating mechanisms rather than pesticides and other chemicals, and relying on minimum artificial inputs from outside the farm system.

Many of these Costa Rican communities are beginning to the effects of globalization as many plantations are buying up land and invading indigenous areas. Recent government action has led to mitigation of such effects. "On September 12, the Administrative Tribunal of Contention ordered the relevant federal agencies – the Institute of Agrarian Development (IDA) and the National Commission of Indigenous Affairs (CONAI) – to expropriate more than 11,000 acres of land to be returned to the Bribri community of the Kekoldi reservation—this part of Bribri territory is currently occupied by non-indigenous people."

== Costa Rican agricultural research and MSME support ==
Costa Rica's National Center for Food Science and Technology (Centro Nacional de Ciencia y Tecnología de Alimentos or CITRA) seeks "to research and develop knowledge in food science and technology closely linked to the agri-food sector in order to innovate, increase its competitiveness, and generate high-quality food." It provides assistance to the Rural and Small Business Agroindustrial Development Program (Proyecto de Desarrollo Agroindustrial Rural y Pequeña y Mediana Empresa (DAIR-PYMES)). DAIR-PYMES provides scientific and technological support to rural agroindustrial MSMEs (Micro, Small, and Medium sized Enterprises).
