= Shiroles, Costa Rica =

Shiroles
- village
- Location within Costa Rica
- Coordinates: 09°35′12″N 082°57′25″W
- Country: Costa Rica
- Province: Limón
- Canton: Talamanca
- District: Bratsi
- Time zone: UTC-6 (CST)
  - Summer (DST): UTC-6 (None)

Shiroles is a village in the Talamanca Mountains, of Bratsi District, Talamanca Canton, Limón Province, Costa Rica. It is served by a small airport (ICAO Code: MRSH), with no commercial flights. The nearest village is Suretka one kilometre to the southeast. The first school in Shiroles was built in 2009, which allowed students to save the fifteen-kilometre trip to the previous closest school in Bribri. The local people are Bribri and Cabécar and their economy is based upon traditional agricultural practices.
