= China Kichá =

Coordinates: 9°11′N 83°29′W

- Indigenous Territory
- Interactive map of China Kichá
- Country: Costa Rica

China Kichá is an indigenous territory in Costa Rica. The indigenous people have been attacked. Doris Ríos has noted that although complaints are made to the authorities little seems to be done. Doris Ríos has won an international award for her work.
