= Francisco Hernández Basante =

Costa Rican chess player

Personal information
- Full name: Francisco Javier Hernández Basante
- Born: 20 May 1972 (age 54)

Chess career
- Country: Costa Rica
- Title: International Master (2000)
- FIDE rating: 2211 (April 2017)
- Peak rating: 2320 (July 1998)

Francisco Javier Hernández Basante (born 20 May 1972) is a Costa Rican chess player. As part of the Costa Rica national team, he has participated in five Chess Olympiads (1994, 2000, 2004, 2006, 2008). He received the FIDE titles of International Master (IM) in 2000 and FIDE Trainer in 2005. His peak FIDE rating was 2320 in July 1998.
