= La Casona, Puntarenas =

Coordinates: 8°50′11″N 83°04′26″W

La Casona is a community in the Ngäbe-Buglé indigenous territory of Coto Brus. The indigenous territory is located in the canton of the same name in Puntarenas Province, Costa Rica.
