= Costa Ricans =

People of Costa Rica

Costa Ricans Costarricenses
- Flag of Costa Rica

- Map of the Costa Rican Diaspora in the World

Total population
- Costa Rica 5.13 million

Regions with significant populations
- United States: 96,903
- Nicaragua: 11,281
- Panama: 9,320
- Spain: 4,505
- Canada: 4,252
- Mexico: 3,430
- Germany: 2,097
- Colombia: 1,828
- Italy: 1,658 – 523 (2022)
- Guatemala: 1,248
- Switzerland: 1,097
- Venezuela: 1,061
- Ecuador: 1,027
- Netherlands: 978
- El Salvador: 889
- Honduras: 879
- France: 858
- United Kingdom: 712
- Peru: 638
- Australia: 580
- Brazil: 490 (2020) – 2,295 (2025)
- Sweden: 483
- Belgium: 349
- Norway: 320
- Dominican Republic: 320
- Haiti: 267
- Austria: 220
- Denmark: 196
- Bolivia: 162
- Czech Republic: 158

Languages
- Spanish; Limonese; Bribri; Ngäbere; other indigenous languages

Religion
- Predominantly Roman Catholic,; Protestant, Buddhist and other religious minorities exist

Related ethnic groups
- Spaniards; Nicaraguans • Costa Rican Americans; Italians; Chorotega; Afro-Costa Rican; Amerindians; Chinese; Mulatto

Costa Ricans (Spanish: Costarricenses, colloquially known as Ticos) are the citizens of Costa Rica, a multiethnic, Spanish-speaking nation in Central America. Costa Ricans are predominantly Mestizos, other ethnic groups people of Indigenous, European, African, and Asian (predominantly Chinese) descent.

By 2018, Costa Rica had a population of approximately 5,000,000 people. The population growth rate between 2005 and 2010 was estimated to be 1.5% annually, with a birth rate of 17.8 live births per 1,000 inhabitants and a mortality rate of 4.1 deaths per 1,000 inhabitants. By 2016, the population had increased to about 4.9 million.

Costa Rica was the point where the Mesoamerican and South American native cultures met. The northwest of the country, the Nicoya Peninsula, was the southernmost point of Mesoamerican cultural influence when the Spanish conquerors (conquistadores) came in the 16th century. The central and southern portions of the country were inhabited by Chibchan-speaking peoples. The Atlantic coast, meanwhile, was populated with Jamaican immigrant workers during the 19th century. The country has received immigration from Europe, Africa, Asia, the Americas, etc. Historically, the largest immigrant diaspora in Costa Rica is people from Nicaragua and Central America's Northern Triangle.

== History ==
Costa Rica was one of the relatively more isolated populations of the New Spain viceroyalty

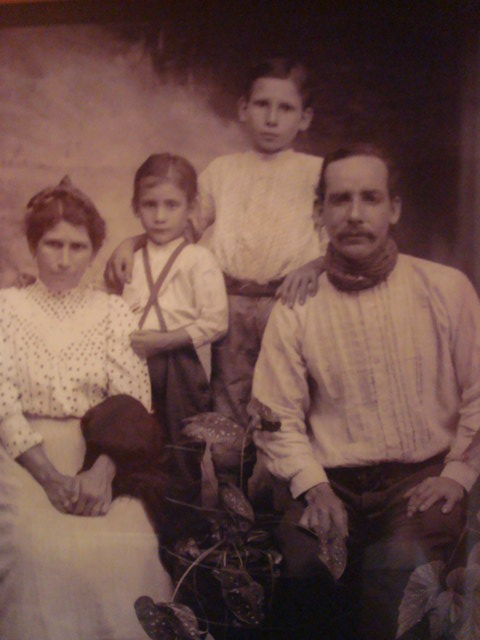
Average Costa Rican Family – Early Twentieth Century.

The colonial period began when Christopher Columbus reached the eastern coast of Costa Rica on his fourth voyage in 1502. Several subsequent expeditions followed, eventually leading to the first Spanish colony, Villa Bruselas, in Costa Rica in 1524.

During most of the colonial period, Costa Rica was the southernmost province of the Captaincy General of Guatemala, which was nominally part of the Viceroyalty of New Spain (i.e., Mexico), but which in practice operated as a largely autonomous entity within the Spanish Empire. Costa Rica's distance from the capital in Guatemala, its legal prohibition under Spanish law to trade with its southern neighbors in Panama, then part of the Viceroyalty of New Granada (i.e., Colombia), and the lack of resources such as gold and silver, made Costa Rica into a poor, isolated, and sparsely inhabited region within the Spanish Empire. Costa Rica was described as "the poorest and most miserable Spanish colony in all America" by a Spanish governor in 1719.

Another important factor behind Costa Rica's poverty was the lack of a significant indigenous population available for forced labor, which meant that most of the Costa Rican settlers had to work on their own land, preventing the establishment of large haciendas. For all these reasons, Costa Rica was unappreciated and overlooked by the Spanish Crown and left to develop independently. The small landowners' relative poverty, the lack of a large indigenous labor force, the population's ethnic and linguistic homogeneity, and Costa Rica's isolation from the Spanish colonial centers in Mexico and the Andes all contributed to the development of an autonomous and individualistic agrarian society. Even the Governor had to farm his own crops and tend to his own garden due to the poverty that he lived in. An egalitarian tradition also arose. Costa Rica became a "rural democracy" with no oppressed mestizo or indigenous class. It was not long before Spanish settlers turned to the hills, where they found rich volcanic soil and a milder climate than that of the lowlands.

== Ethnic groups ==
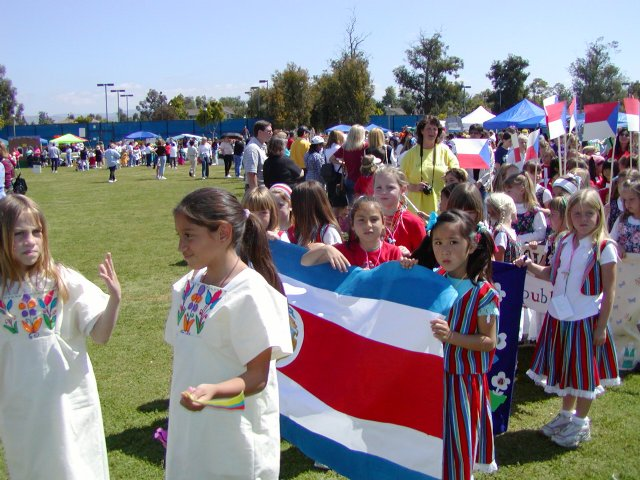
Costa Rican children.

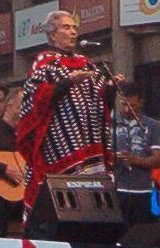
Chavela Vargas Mixed-Costa Rican Born – Singer

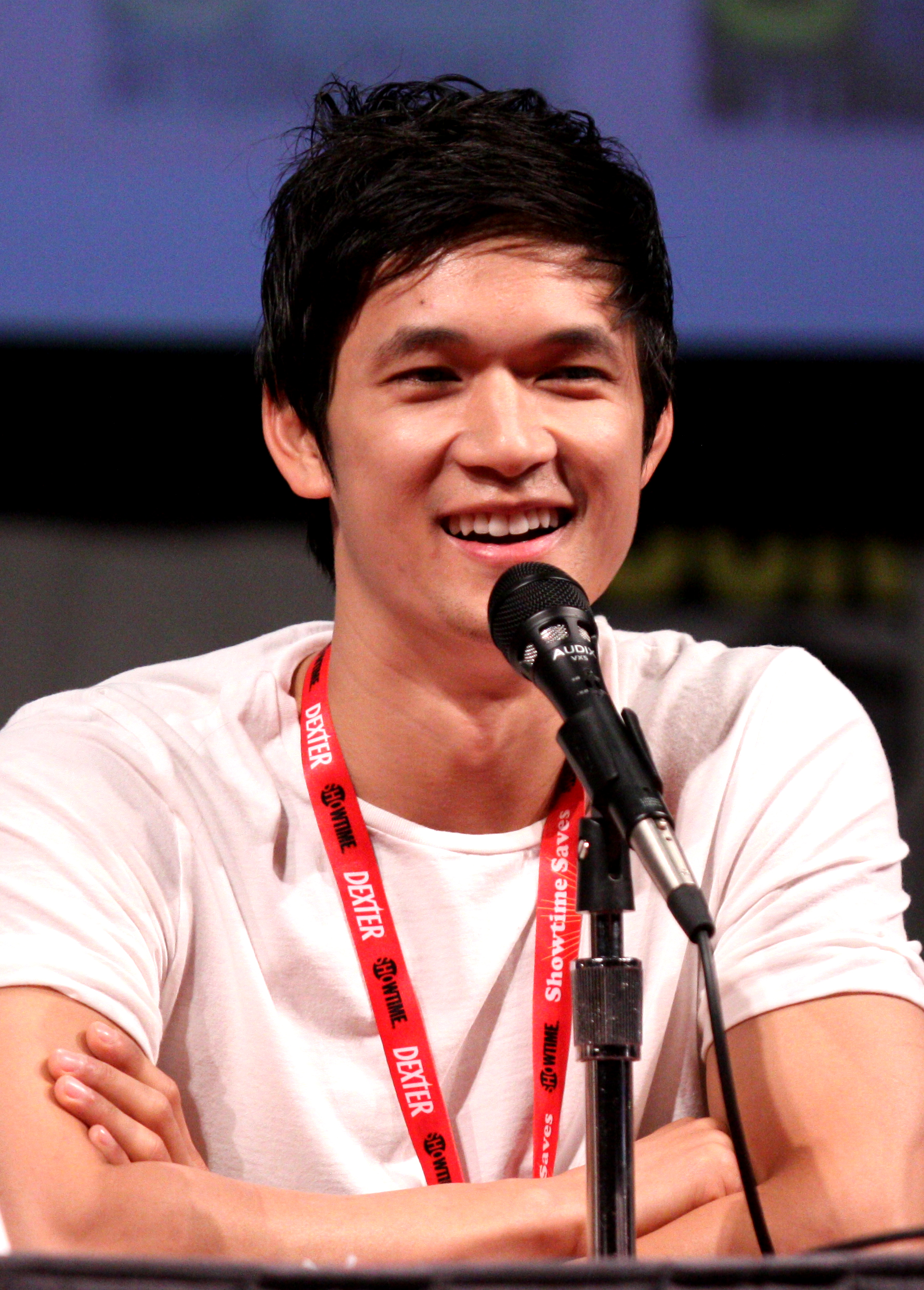
Harry Shum Jr Asian-Costa Rican – Glee Actor/Dancer

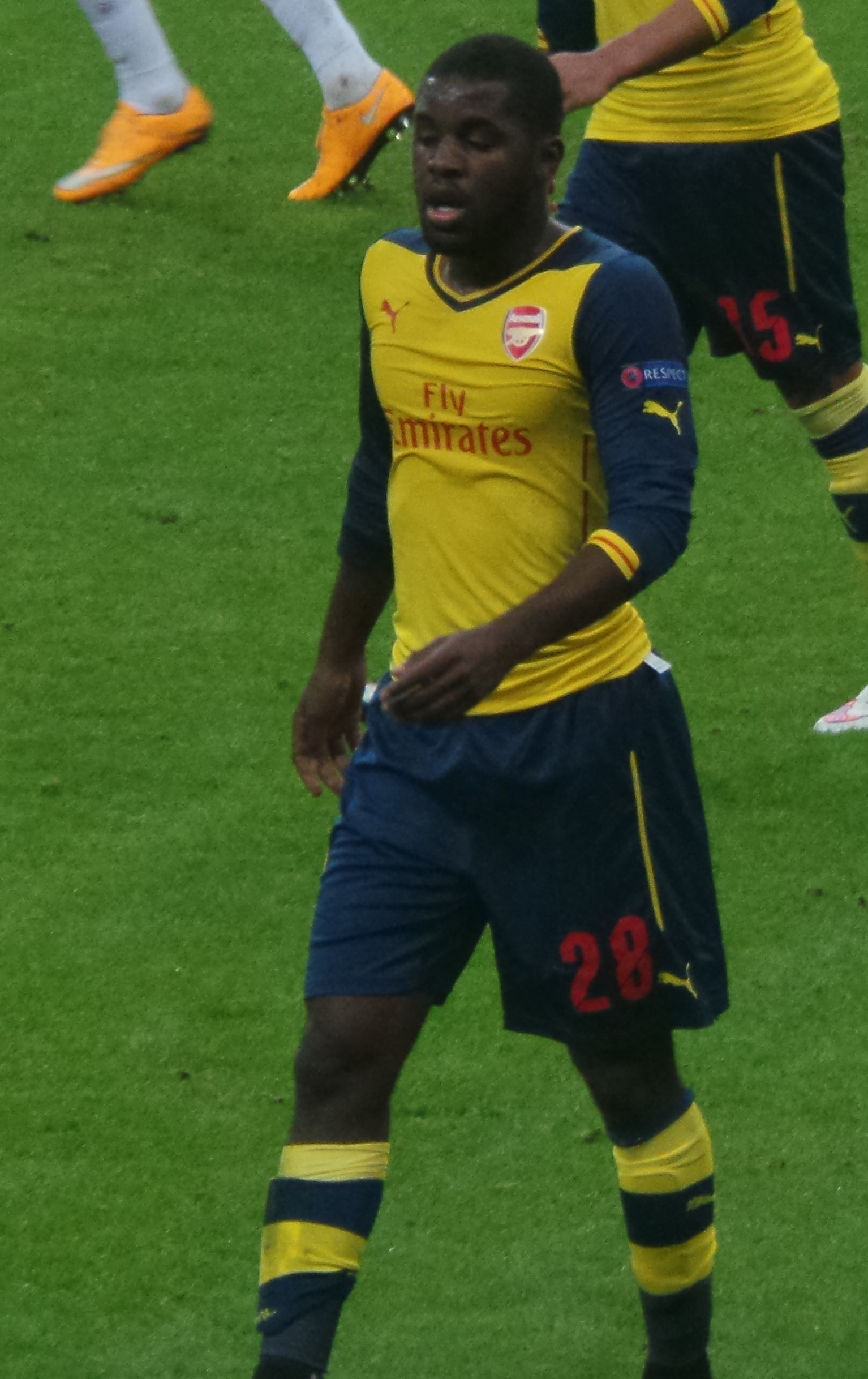
Joel Campbell Afro-Costa Rican Football Player

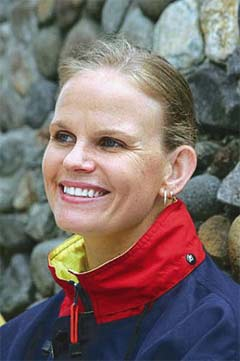
Claudia Poll, Euro-Costa Rican, Gold-Medalist Olympic Swimmer

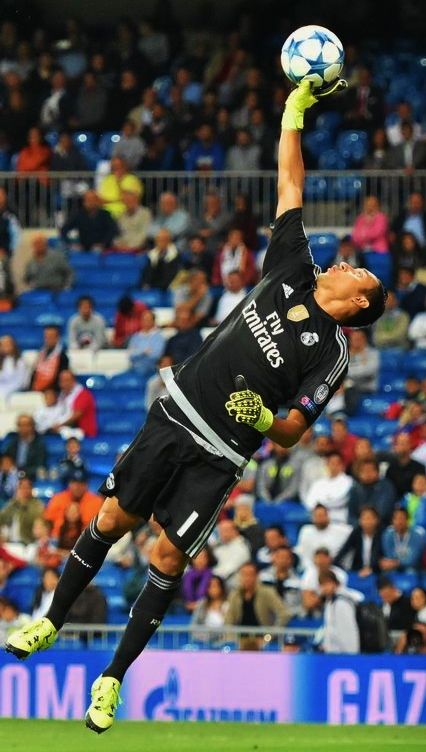
Keylor Navas Native Costa Rican – Real Madrid Goalkeeper

A question on ethnic or racial ancestral origins was previously asked in the 1927 and 1950 census. The most-recent official 2022 census asked people to identify using multiple options including Indigenous, Black or Afro-descendant, Mulatto, Chinese, Mestizo, white and other on (Question 7) section IV.

As of 2019, most Costa Ricans are primarily of Spanish ancestry with minorities of Nicaraguan, Italian, Portuguese, German, French, British, Irish, Jamaican, Greek, mixed, or other Latin American ancestries.

=== Europeans or white ===
European migrants used Costa Rica to cross the isthmus of Central America and to reach the USA's West Coast (California) in the late 19th century and until the 1910s (before the Panama Canal opened).

Many of the first Spanish colonists in Costa Rica may have been Jewish converts to Christianity who were expelled from Spain in 1492 and fled to colonial backwaters to avoid the Inquisition. According to DNA tests from Ancestry.com and 23&me most of the original Costa Rican population from the Central Valley have around 1-3% Sephardi Jewish DNA. The first sizable group of self-identified Jews immigrated from Poland, beginning in 1929. From the 1930s to the early 1950s, journalistic and official anti-Semitic campaigns fueled harassment of Jews; however, by the 1950s and 1960s, the immigrants won greater acceptance. Most of the 3,500 Costa Rican Jews today are not highly observant but remain primarily endogamous.

=== Afro-descendants ===
Costa Rica has four small minority groups: Mulattos, Blacks, Amerindians and Asians. About 8% of the population is of African descent or Mulatto (mix of European and African) who are called Afro-Costa Ricans, English-speaking descendants of 19th century Afro-Jamaican immigrant workers.

In 1873, the Atlantic Railroad imported 653 Chinese indentured laborers, hoping to duplicate the success of rail projects that used Chinese labor in Peru, Cuba, and the United States. Asians represent less than 0.5% of the Costa Rican population.

=== Indigenous ===
There are also over 104,000 Native American or indigenous inhabitants, representing 2.4% of the population. Most of them live in secluded reservations, distributed among eight ethnic groups: Quitirrisí (in the Central Valley), Matambú or Chorotega (Guanacaste), Maleku (northern Alajuela), Bribri (southern Atlantic), Cabécar (Cordillera de Talamanca), Guaymí (southern Costa Rica, along the Panamá border), Boruca (southern Costa Rica) and Térraba (southern Costa Rica).

=== Genetic makeup, XXI Century ===
Today, according to modern DNA test data, the average Costa Rican (with 4 Costa Rican grand-parents) from the Central Valley is around 69% European, mainly Spanish, Basque, or Portuguese, with around 24% Native American DNA from Central America, Colombia, or Venezuelan, and 7% African particularly from Cameroon, Senegal or Congo. Native Americans from other regions in the Americas, European Jewish, Italian, Irish, and Asian and Middle Eastern DNA can also be traced in part of the current Costa Rican population. Values vary drastically by region.

== Immigration ==
A considerable portion of the Costa Rican population is made up of Nicaraguans. There is also a number of Colombian refugees. Moreover, Costa Rica took in many refugees from a range of other Latin American countries fleeing civil wars and dictatorships during the 1970s and 80s – notably from El Salvador, Chile, Cuba, and recently from Venezuela.

Immigrants represent 15% of the Costa Rican population, the largest in Central America and the Caribbean. By 2019 the largest Immigrant Diasporas in Costa Rica are people from: Nicaragua, Colombia, Honduras, El Salvador, Venezuela, and the United States.

== Population ==
Approximately 40% live in rural areas and 60% in urban areas. The rate of urbanization estimated for the period 2005–2010 is 2.3% per annum, one of the highest among developing countries.

Province	Province population	City	City population
San Jose Province	1,345,750	San Jose de Costa Rica	350,535
Alajuela Province	716,286	Alajuela	46,554
Cartago Province	432,395	Cartago	156,600
Puntarenas Province	357,483	Puntarenas	102,504
Heredia Province	354,732	Heredia	42,600
Limon Province	339,395	Puerto Limon	105,000
Guanacaste Province	264,238	Liberia	98,751

== Languages ==
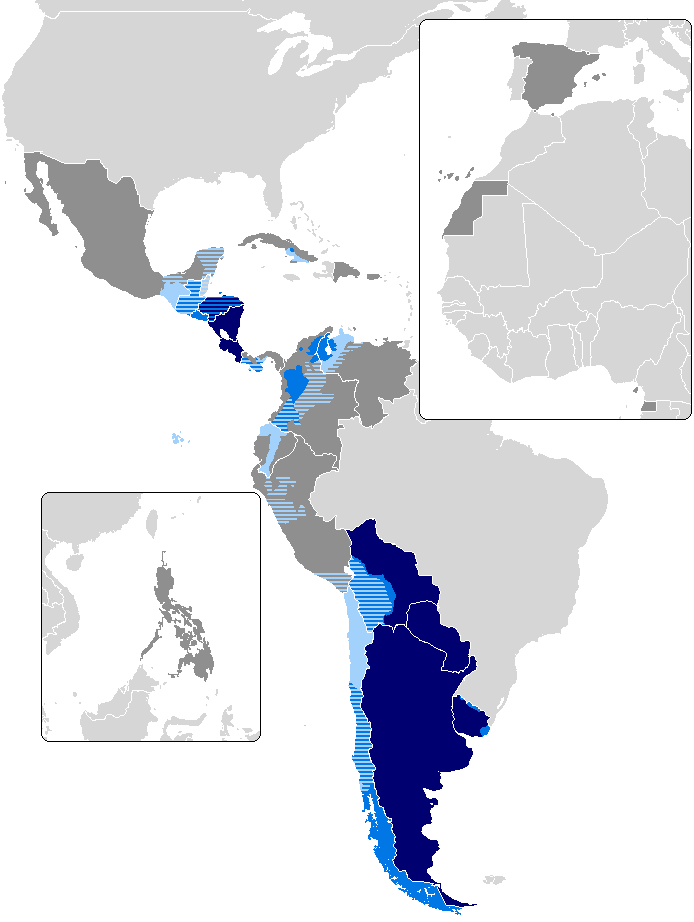
Distribution of voseo: spoken + written primarily spoken spoken, alternating with tuteo absent

The primary language spoken in Costa Rica is Costa Rican Spanish; one of the main particularities of Costa Rica Spanish is the usage of the second person singular pronoun vos (called voseo) or usted instead of tú. Some native languages are still spoken in indigenous reservations. The most numerically important are the Bribri, Maléku, Cabécar, and Ngäbere languages, some of which have several thousand speakers in Costa Rica and others a few hundred. Some languages, such as Teribe and Boruca, have fewer than a thousand speakers. A Creole-English language, Jamaican patois (or Mekatelyu), is spoken along the Caribbean coast. About 10.7% of Costa Rica's adult population (18 or older) also speaks English, 0.7% French, and 0.3% speaks Portuguese or German as a second language. Mennonite immigrants to the country also speak Plautdietsch.

== Religion ==
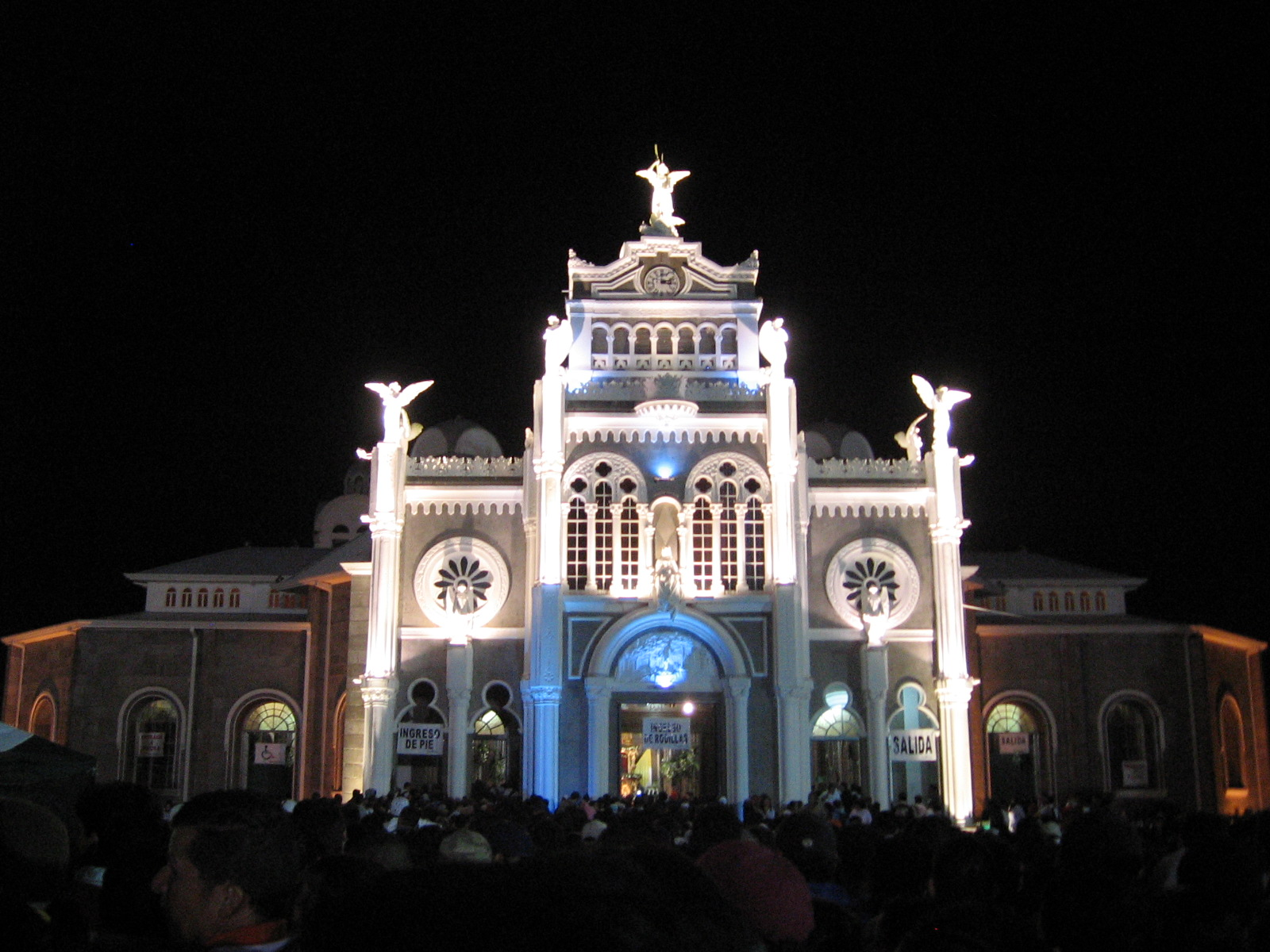
Basílica de Nuestra Señora de los Ángeles (Basilica of Our Lady of the Angels), during 2007 pilgrimage

Christianity is the predominant religion, and Roman Catholicism is the official state religion according to the 1949 Constitution, which at the same time guarantees freedom of religion.

According to the most recent nationwide survey of religion, conducted in 2007 by the University of Costa Rica, 70.5% of Costa Ricans are Roman Catholics, 44.9% are practicing Catholics, 13.8% are evangelical Protestants, 11.3% report they do not have a religion, and 4.3% belonged to another religion.

Because of the recent small but continuous immigration from Asia (including West Asia/the Middle East), other religions have grown, the most popular being Buddhism (because of a growing Han Chinese community of 40,000), and smaller numbers of followers of the Hindu, Jewish, Muslim and Baháʼí Faiths.

The Sinagoga Shaarei Zion synagogue is near La Sabana Metropolitan Park in San José. Several homes in the neighborhood east of the park display the Star of David and other Jewish symbols.

The Church of Jesus Christ of Latter-day Saints (Mormons) claim more than 35,000 members and has a temple in San Jose that served as a regional worship center for Costa Rica, Panama, Nicaragua, and Honduras. However, they represent less than one percent of the population.

== Emigration and immigration ==
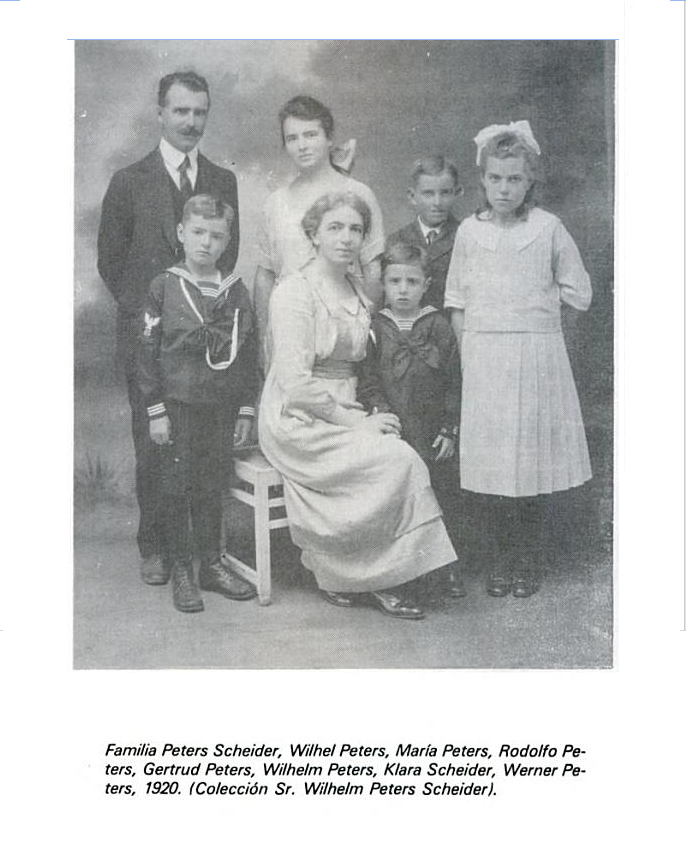
Family of German immigrants in Costa Rica.

Costa Rica's emigration is the smallest in the Caribbean Basin and is among the smallest in the Americas. By 2015 about just 133,185 (2,77%) of the country's people live in another country as immigrants. The main destination countries are the United States (85,924), Nicaragua (10,772), Panama (7,760), Canada (5,039), Spain (3,339), Mexico (2,464), Germany (1,891), Italy (1,508), Guatemala (1,162) and Venezuela (1,127). In 2005, there were 127,061 Costa Ricans living in another country as immigrants. Remittances were $513,000,000 in 2006 and they represented 2.3% of the country's GDP.

Costa Rica's immigration is among the largest in the Caribbean Basin. Immigrants represent about 10.2% of the Costa Rican population. The main countries of origin are Nicaragua, Colombia, United States and El Salvador. In 2005, 440,957 people lived in the country as immigrants. Outward Remittances were $246,000,000 in 2006.

== See also ==
- Costa Rica
- Culture of Costa Rica
- Afro-Costa Ricans
- Italian Costa Ricans
- Chinese people in Costa Rica
- Costa Rican Americans
- Indigenous peoples of Costa Rica
- Criollo people
- Hispanics
