= Cocles =

Cocles, Cocle, or Coclé may refer to:

== People ==
- Horatius Cocles, a hero in the historical legends of ancient Rome
- Bartolomeo della Rocca (1467–1504), called Cocles, Italian scholar

== Places ==
- Hispanicized spelling of Kéköldi, a Costa Rican indigenous community
- Coclé Province, Panama
  - Coclé, Coclé, a corregimiento (subdistrict)

== Animals ==
- Cocle salamander (Bolitoglossa schizodactyla)

== See also ==
- Coclé del Norte, Panama
- Cocle del Norte River, Panama
- Cocle del Sur River, Panama
- Cochlea, part of the inner ear
- Cockle (disambiguation)
- Kokle, a Latvian string instrument
