= Cabécar =

Cabécar may refer to:

- Cabécar people, an indigenous people of Costa Rica
- Cabécar language, the language of the Cabécar people
- Talamanca Cabecar, an indigenous territory of the Cabécar in Costa Rica
