= Cockley =

Cockley may refer to:

- Cockley Beck, a small hamlet, situated in the Duddon Valley in Cumbria, England
- Cockley Cley, a village and civil parish in the English county of Norfolk
- Burt Cockley (born 1986), Australian cricketer who has played for New South Wales and Western Australia
- David L. Cockley (1843–1901), American soldier who fought in the American Civil War

== See also ==
- Cockle (disambiguation)
- Cocky (disambiguation)
- Ockley, Surrey, England
