= Puerto Viejo =

Puerto Viejo (Spanish for "Old Port" or "Old Harbor") can refer to two towns in Costa Rica:

- Puerto Viejo de Talamanca
- Puerto Viejo de Sarapiquí
