= National Route 801 (Costa Rica) =

National Road Route in Costa Rica

National Tertiary Route 801
- Ruta nacional terciaria 801

Route information
- Maintained by Ministry of Public Works and Transport
- Length: 19.945 km (12.393 mi)

Location
- Country: Costa Rica
- Provinces: Limón

Highway system
- National Road Network of Costa Rica
← Route 761	→ Route 802

National Tertiary Route 801, or just Route 801 (Spanish: Ruta Nacional Terciaria 801, or Ruta 801) is a National Road Route of Costa Rica, located in the Limón province.

== Description ==
In Limón province the route covers Talamanca canton (Bratsi district).
