= Conteburica =

Conte Burica
- Indigenous Territory
- Location within Costa Rica
- Country: Costa Rica

Conte Burica is an indigenous territory in Costa Rica.
