= Indigenous territory (Costa Rica) =

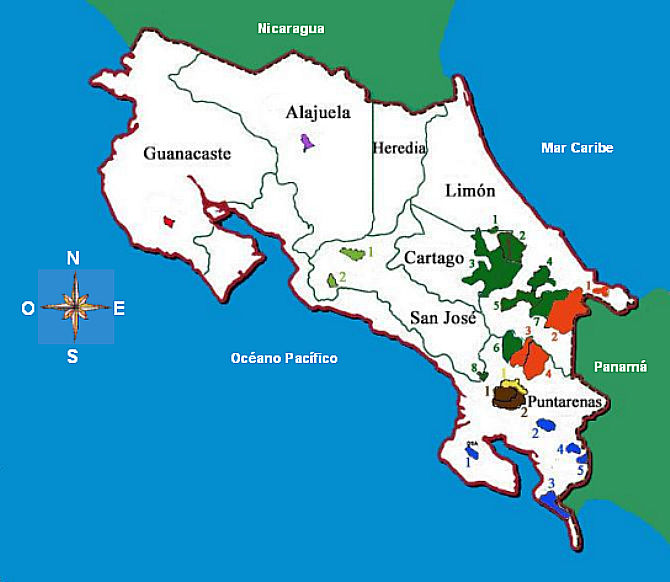
Map of the Indigenous territories in Costa Rica: Chorotegas Guatusos Huetares Cabécar / Bribri Térraba Boruca Ngobe

According to Costa Rica's 1977 Indigenous Law, the Indigenous Territories are the traditional lands of the legally recognized Indigenous peoples of Costa Rica. The Republic of Costa Rica recognizes eight native ethnicities; Bribris, Chorotegas, Malekus, Ngöbe, Huetars, Cabecars, Borucas and Terrabas.

The Law also provides the territories of self-government and autonomy according to the traditional organization of the tribes, yet this is hardly applied. According to the Law all non-Indigenous residents with properties in the areas acquired before the promulgation of the Law should be relocated and/or indemnified, and all posterior acquisition of lands is illegal and should be expropriated with no compensation, but this hasn't been endorsed by Costa Rica's government. Tension between Indigenous and non-Indigenous residents of the areas of Salitre and Cabagra has become violent to the point of mutual aggressions.

== Territories ==
Currently there are 24 officially recognized Indigenous territories:

Territory	Ethnicity	Canton	Province	Language	Year of creation
Térraba	Teribe people	Buenos Aires	Puntarenas Province	Spanish and Teribe	1956
Guatuso	Guatuso people	Guatuso and San Carlos	Alajuela Province	Spanish and Maléku	1977
Kéköldi	Bribri people	Talamanca	Limón Province	Bribri and Spanish	1977
Quitirrisí	Huetar people	Mora	San José Province	Spanish	1979
Matambú	Chorotega people	Hojancha and Nicoya	Guanacaste Province	Spanish	1980
Abrojos Montezuma	Ngabe people	Corredores	Puntarenas Province	Ngäbere	1980
Coto Brus	Ngabe people	Coto Brus and Buenos Aires	Puntarenas Province	Ngäbere	1981
Conte Burica	Ngabe people	Golfito and Corredores	Puntarenas Province	Ngäbere	1982
Ujarrás	Cabécar people	Buenos Aires	Puntarenas Province	Cabécar	1982
Salitre	Bribri people	Buenos Aires	Puntarenas Province	Bribri and Spanish	1982
Cabagra	Bribri people	Buenos Aires	Puntarenas Province	Bribri and Spanish	1982
Tayní	Cabécar people	Limón	Limón Province	Cabécar	1984
Telire	Cabécar people	Talamanca	Limón Province	Cabécar	1985
Cabecar Talamanca	Cabécar people	Talamanca	Limón Province	Cabécar	1985
Bribri Talamanca	Bribri people	Talamanca	Limón Province	Bribri and Spanish	1985
Zapatón	Huetar people	Puriscal	San José Province	Spanish	1986
Ngobe-Bugle	Ngabe people	Golfito and Osa	Puntarenas Province	Ngäbere	1990
Nairi-Awari	Cabécar people	Turrialba, Matina and Siquirres	Cartago Province; Limón Province	Cabécar	1991
Bajo Chirripó	Cabécar people	Turrialba and Limón	Cartago Province; Limón Province	Cabécar	1992
Alto Chirripó	Cabécar people	Turrialba and Matina	Cartago Province; Limón Province	Cabécar	1993
Curré	Brunca people	Buenos Aires	Puntarenas Province	Boruca	1993
Boruca	Brunca people	Buenos Aires	Puntarenas Province	Boruca	1993
China Kichá	Cabécar people	Pérez Zeledón	San José Province	Cabécar	2001
Altos de San Antonio	Ngabe people	Golfito	Puntarenas Province	Ngäbere	2001
