= Abrojo Montezuma =

- Indigenous Territory
- Location within Costa Rica
- Country: Costa Rica

Abrojo Montezuma is an indigenous territory in Costa Rica.
