= Zapatón =

- Indigenous Territory
- Location within Costa Rica
- Coordinates: 9.6866°N 84.3316°W
- Country: Costa Rica

Zapatón is an indigenous territory in Costa Rica.
