= Alto Chirripó =

- Indigenous Territory
- Location within Costa Rica
- Coordinates: 9.7794831°N 83.4227031°W
- Country: Costa Rica

Alto Chirripó is an indigenous territory in Costa Rica.
