= Tayní =

- Indigenous Territory
- Interactive map of Tayní
- Country: Costa Rica

Tayní is an indigenous territory in Costa Rica.
