= Cockie =

Cockie or Cocky is a given name and a surname. Notable people with the name include:

== Given name ==
- Cockie van der Elst (1928–2021), Dutch speed skater
- Cocky Collins, (1887–1951), American baseball player
- Cocky Gastelaars (born 1938), Dutch swimmer
- Cocky Hunter (1885–1934), English footballer
- Cocky Mazzetti (1937–2024), Italian pop singer
- Cocky Siaki (born 1974), American professional wrestler

== Surname ==
- Adam Cockie (born 1989), Australian rules footballer
- James Cockie (died 1573), Scottish goldsmith

== See also ==
- Cocky (disambiguation)
