= Altos de San Antonio =

Coordinates: 8.60850°N 82.85090°W

- Indigenous Territory
- Interactive map of Altos de San Antonio
- Country: Costa Rica

Altos de San Antonio is an indigenous territory in Costa Rica.
