= Telire District =

District in Talamanca canton, Limón province, Costa Rica

Telire
- District
- Telire district
- Telire district location in Costa Rica
- Coordinates: 9.3725885°N 83.1654328°W
- Country: Costa Rica
- Province: Limón
- Canton: Talamanca
- Creation: 14 April 2004

Area
  - Total: 2,229.73 km^{2} (860.90 sq mi)
- Elevation: 70 m (230 ft)

Population (2011)
  - Total: 6,240
  - Density: 2.80/km^{2} (7.25/sq mi)
- Time zone: UTC−06:00
- Postal code: 70404

Telire is a district of the Talamanca canton in the Limón province of Costa Rica.

== History ==
Telire was created on 14 April 2004 by Decreto Ejecutivo 31772-G.

== Geography ==
Telire has an area of 2,229.73 km^{2} and an elevation of 70 metres.

== Locations ==
- Poblados: Alto Cuen (Kjacka Bata), Alto Lari (Duriñak), Alto Urén, Arenal, Bajo Blei, Bajo Cuen, Boca Urén, Bris, Cachabli, Coroma, Croriña, China Kichá, Dururpe, Guachalaba, Katsi, Kichuguecha, Kivut, Mojoncito, Namuwakir, Orochico, Ourut, Purisquí, Purita, Rangalle, San José Cabecar, Sepeque, Shewab, Sipurio, Soky, Sorókicha, Sukut, Surayo, Suiri, Telire, Turubokicha, Urén.

== Demographics ==
Historical population
Census	Pop.	±% p.a.
2011	6,240	—
2022	10,006	+4.39%
Source: Instituto Nacional de Estadística y Censos; Centro Centroamericano de Población

For the 2011 census, Telire had a population of 6,240 inhabitants.
