= Limón International Airport =

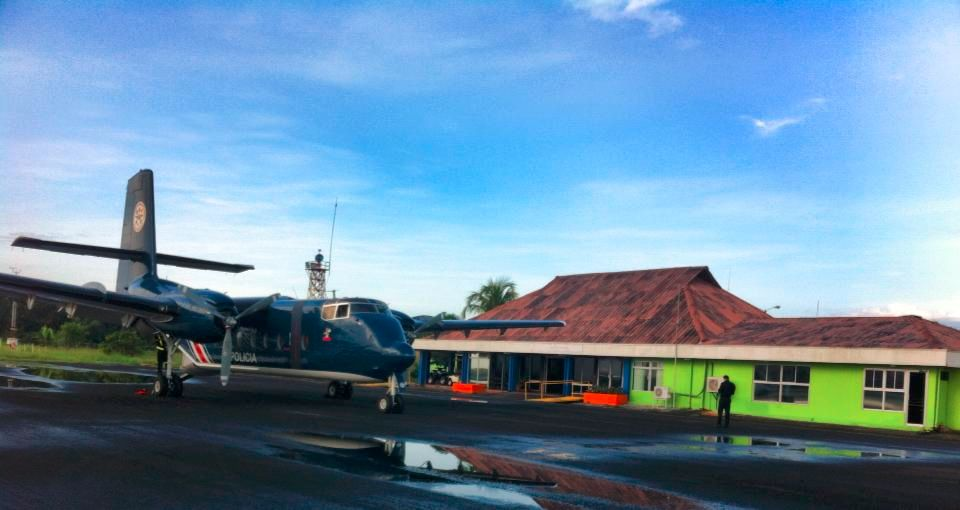
- IATA: LIO; ICAO: MRLM

Summary
- Airport type: Public
- Operator: Dirección General de Aviación Civil
- Serves: Limón, Costa Rica
- Elevation AMSL: 7 ft (2.1 m)
- Coordinates: 09°57′28″N 083°01′19″W

Map
- Location in Costa Rica

Runways
Direction	Length		Surface
Direction	m	ft	Surface
14/32	1,800	5,906	Asphalt
- Source: Costa Rican AIP GCM Google Maps

Limón International Airport (Spanish: Aeropuerto Internacional de Limón) (IATA: LIO, ICAO: MRLM) in Limón, Costa Rica, is one of the four international airports in that country.

Puerto Limón and the southern Caribbean area towns of Cahuita, Puerto Viejo, Manzanillo and Gandoca, as well as the indigenous communities of Bri Bri, Hone Creek, Carbon 1 and 2, Shiroles and Suretka are all within two hours of the airport by ground transportation.

Although labelled as an international airport, its current passenger flights are only domestic. Nature Air, when it was last active, flew only charter flights to Limón. SANSA Airlines flies daily flights to and from San José's Juan Santamaria International Airport.

The Limon non-directional beacon (Ident: LIO) is located 1.4 nautical miles (2.6 km) northwest of the airport. The Limon VOR/DME (Ident: LIO) is located on the field.

== History ==
The airport re-opened on 1 July 2006 after being closed nearly 20 years for domestic flights. It is the primary airport serving the Caribbean side of Costa Rica.

The Presidency Ministry announced in June 2011 that Sansa Airlines would begin regular scheduled flights four times a week to Limón Airport, beginning in July and costing ₡30,000–₡75,000 ($60–$150), to increase tourism to Limón Province.

There are plans to modernize the airport with a new passenger terminal that reflects the local culture as well as being environmentally friendly.

The landing area will be expanded from 10 meters wide to 18 meters, and up to 1137 meters in length.

== Airlines and destinations ==
Airlines	Destinations
Sansa Airlines	Bocas del Toro, San José–Juan Santamaría, Tortuguero

== See also ==
- Transport in Costa Rica
- List of airports in Costa Rica
