= Boruca (Indigenous territory) =

Coordinates: 9°00′N 83°20′W

Territorio Indígena Boruca
- Indigenous Territory
- Interactive map of Territorio Indígena Boruca
- Country: Costa Rica

Territorio Indígena Boruca is an indigenous territory in Costa Rica.
