= Talamanca (canton) =

Canton in Limón province, Costa Rica

- Canton
- Flag
- Talamanca canton
- Talamanca canton location in Costa Rica
- Coordinates: 9.4186631°N 83.0200471°W
- Country: Costa Rica
- Province: Limón
- Creation: 20 May 1969
- Head city: Bribri
- Districts: Districts: Bratsi; Sixaola; Cahuita; Telire

Government
  - Type: Municipality
  - Body: Municipalidad de Talamanca

Area
  - Total: 2,809.93 km^{2} (1,084.92 sq mi)
- Elevation: 29 m (95 ft)

Population (2011)
  - Total: 30,712
  - Density: 10.930/km^{2} (28.308/sq mi)
- Time zone: UTC−06:00
- Canton code: 704

Talamanca is a canton in the Limón province of Costa Rica. The head city is Bribri, located in Bratsi district.

== History ==
Talamanca was created on 20 May 1969 by decree 4339.

== Geography ==
Talamanca has an area of 2,809.93 km^{2} and a mean elevation of 29 metres.

The county is noted for its beautiful beaches, especially in Cahuita and Puerto Viejo, which are popular tourist locations.

Talamanca contains one of Costa Rica's three official border-crossing points with Panama, the Sixaola-Guabito crossing.

== Districts ==
The canton of Talamanca is subdivided into the following districts:

1. Bratsi
2. Sixaola
3. Cahuita
4. Telire

== Demographics ==
Historical population
Census	Pop.	±% p.a.
1973	5,431	—
1984	11,013	+6.64%
2000	25,857	+5.48%
2011	30,712	+1.58%
2022	48,906	+4.32%
Source: Instituto Nacional de Estadística y Censos; Centro Centroamericano de Población

For the 2011 census, Talamanca had a population of 30,712 inhabitants.

The county suffers from pervasive poverty. As of 2009, its human-development index is the lowest-ranked of all Costa Rican cantons. While its most recent infant mortality rate is 12.89% (2009), it was as high as 22.5% (2003), and stayed above 15% between 2003 and 2007. As of 2010, 52.3% of Talamanca inhabitants have access to sanitation (either piped or septic tank), and 75.2% are connected to electricity.

The county is composed of four districts (see graphic below), with its capital city, Bribrí, located in the Bratsi district. Talamanca houses the largest indigenous population in the country (at 11,062, or 34% of the county's population), which is composed principally of the Bribri and Cabécar groups (who in turn represent two of Costa Rica's eight distinct indigenous groups). 31% of the district covers Talamanca's four indigenous reserves (Kekoldi, Talamanca Bribrí, Talamanca Cabécar, and Telire);

== Transportation ==
=== Road transportation ===
The canton is covered by the following road routes:

- National Route 36
- National Route 256
- National Route 801

== Conservation ==
Eighty-eight percent of Talamanca's territory is protected. Fifty-five percent of this land falls under the Chirripó, Amistad, and Cahuita National Parks; and 2% belongs to the Jairo Mora Sandoval Gandoca-Manzanillo Mixed Wildlife Refuge (a major sea turtle nesting ground).

In defense of these areas, for example, on July 27, 2011, the Ministerio de Ambiente, Energía y Telecomunicaciones (Minaet) carried out the demolition of two hotels (Las Palmas and Suerre), due to their occupation of 4 hectares of land within the Jairo Mora Sandoval Gandoca-Manzanillo Mixed Wildlife Refuge.

== See also ==
- Talamancan mythology
