= Bajo Chirripó =

- Indigenous Territory
- Interactive map of Bajo Chirripó
- Coordinates: 9.908351°N 83.299478°W
- Country: Costa Rica

Bajo Chirripó is an indigenous territory in Costa Rica.
