= Cockle Creek =

Cockle Creek may refer to:

- Cockle Creek (Tasmania), in Australia
- Cockle Creek (Virginia), in the United States
- Cockle Creek railway station, in Boolaroo, New South Wales, Australia
- Battle of Cockle Creek, during the American Civil War
