= Cockleshell =

Cockleshell may refer to:

- The shell of a cockle, an edible, marine bivalve mollusc
- Cockleshell Bay, a stop-motion children's television series
- The Cockleshell Heroes, a 1955 British Technicolor war film
- Lentinellus cochleatus (also aniseed cockleshell), a wood-inhabiting fungus
