= Telire, Costa Rica =

Telire
- Indigenous Territory
- Interactive map of Telire
- Country: Costa Rica

Telire is an indigenous territory in Costa Rica.

== Geography ==
It includes the upper basin of the Telire River. It is a geographically isolated region that borders the La Amistad International Park to the south.

== Demography ==
As of the 2011 census, this territory has a total population of 545 inhabitants, of which 533 inhabitants (97.80%) self-identify as being of indigenous ethnicity.
