= Curré =

- Indigenous Territory
- Interactive map of Curré
- Country: Costa Rica

Curré is an indigenous territory in Costa Rica.
