= Bratsi =

District in Talamanca canton, Limón province, Costa Rica

- District
- Interactive map of Bratsi
- Bratsi district location in Costa Rica
- Coordinates: 9.6099814°N 82.9720325°W
- Country: Costa Rica
- Province: Limón
- Canton: Talamanca
- Creation: 19 February 1970

Area
  - Total: 180.44 km^{2} (69.67 sq mi)
- Elevation: 32 m (105 ft)

Population (2011)
  - Total: 7,318
  - Density: 40.56/km^{2} (105.0/sq mi)
- Time zone: UTC−06:00
- Postal code: 70401

Bratsi is a district of the Talamanca canton, in the Limón province of Costa Rica.

Bribri is the head city of the Talamanca canton and is located in this district.

== History ==
Bratsi was created on 19 February 1970 by Decreto Ejecutivo 13.

== Geography ==
Bratsi has an area of 180.44 km^{2}(69.67 sq mi)and an elevation of 32 metres (105 ft).

== Locations ==
- Barrios: Fields, Sand Box.
- Poblados: Altamira, Akberie (Piedra Grande), Bambú, Chase, Cuabre, Gavilán Canta, Mleyuk 1, Mleyuk 2, Monte Sión, Olivia, Hu-Berie (Rancho Grande), Shiroles, Sibujú, Suretka, Uatsi.

== Demographics ==
Historical population
| Census | Pop. | ±% p.a. |
|---|---|---|
| 1892 | 1,835 | — |
| 1927 | 2,714 | +1.12% |
| 1950 | 2,275 | −0.76% |
| 1963 | 3,541 | +3.46% |
| 1973 | 2,790 | −2.36% |
| 1984 | 5,030 | +5.50% |
| 2000 | 10,292 | +4.58% |
| 2011 | 7,318 | −3.05% |
| 2022 | 11,476 | +4.17% |
Source: Instituto Nacional de Estadística y Censos; Centro Centroamericano de Población

For the 2011 census, Bratsi had a population of 7,318 inhabitants.

== Transportation ==
=== Road transportation ===
The district is covered by the following road routes:

- National Route 36
- National Route 801
