= Kéköldi =

Indigenous community of Costa Rica

- Indigenous Territory
- Location within Costa Rica
- Coordinates: 9.638°N 82.798°W
- Country: Costa Rica
- Province: Limón
- Canton: Talamanca
- Established: 1977

Area
  - Total: 36,000 ha (89,000 acres)
- Elevation: 0 m (0 ft)

Population
  - Total: 210
- Time zone: CST (UTC−06:00)

The Indigenous Territory of Kéköldi is one of the Costa Rican indigenous communities and one of the four of the Bribri people. It was created in 1977 and has about 210 inhabitants. It is located in the Talamanca-Caribe biological corridor that covers about 36,000 hectares in the canton of Talamanca, Limón Province. Since 1994, the reserve is run by the Kéköldi Wak ka Köneke Association (Kéköldi Land Carers), which works to preserve indigenous culture and purchase additional land to reforest and conserve. The majority of the population speaks both Bribri and Spanish. The reserve has a biological station for scientific research and a bird watching area for tourists.

== Environment ==
The reserve area includes both primary and secondary forest, as well as a communal reforested area with timber, medicinal and fruit species, and plantations of palm, pejibaye and cocoa. The Bribri have also created a breeding program for green iguanas, which are raised for meat and released into the forest. The reserve's land includes the sources of the Aköldi (Hotel Creek) and Kéköldi (Cocles) rivers, which provide water to the nearby towns of Puerto Viejo, Hone Creek, Patiño, Olivia and Margarita. The site has been designated an Important Bird Area (IBA) by BirdLife International.

== History ==
Indigenous people (Bribri and Cabécar) moved to the Kéköldi area in the 1920s, working as day laborers on cocoa farms along the coast, eventually settling and establishing their own farms. As measles and other diseases struck the Talamancan mountains in the 1930s, more people moved to the coastal region.

In 1973, the Legislative Assembly of Costa Rica charged the National Committee on Indigenous Affairs (CONAI) with promoting projects on behalf of indigenous communities. In 1976, President Daniel Oduber Quiros signed Executive Decree No. 5904-G, defining the terms of establishing indigenous reserves. Later that year, Executive Decree No. 6036-G established several indigenous reserves, including the Talamanca Indigenous Reserve, containing the Cocles (Kéköldi) Reserve as an annex. The Legislative Assembly ratified the establishment on November 16, 1977, in Indigenous Law No. 6172.

The Kéköldi Reserve became independent of the larger Talamanca Reserve through Executive Decree No. 16568-G (1985).

The boundaries and area of the reserves were determined by ITCO (Land and Colonization Institute) in coordination with CONAI. However, ITCO engineers were unable to distinguish cocoa farms (many owned by non-indigenous people) from virgin forest in the aerial photographs they used to draw the boundaries. The original plan designated 3538 hectares for the Kéköldi Reserve. By 1986, Only 38% of the farms in the reserve were owned by indigenous people. The Kéköldi Association petitioned the government to reduce the size of the reserve to 2023 hectares, since CONAI lacked the funds to purchase the remaining farms. The Ministry of the Interior rejected the petition, citing the Indigenous Law of 1977 that prohibits reducing the size of reserves. CONAI also refused, fearing that this would set a precedent endangering the other indigenous reserves in the country. As of 1993, the boundaries of the reserve were still poorly mapped, and not clearly marked on the ground. This has made it difficult to deal with squatters, poachers, and illegal settlement.

The Kéköldi Association's iguana program is an experiment in semi-domestication, funded by the Costa Rican Ministry of Natural Resources, Energy and Mines, the government of Norway (through IUCN), and Asociacion ANAI. The first female iguanas were legally captured from Cahuita National Park, and returned to the park after laying eggs. The Kéköldi Association is also helping to train people from other indigenous reserves to breed iguanas.

To cut down any trees in the reserve, permission is needed from the Association, as well as from the Costa Rican Forestry Department (if the goal is to sell the wood commercially). The profits from the sale of the wood must be shared communally among the indigenous population of the reserve.
