= Doris Ríos =

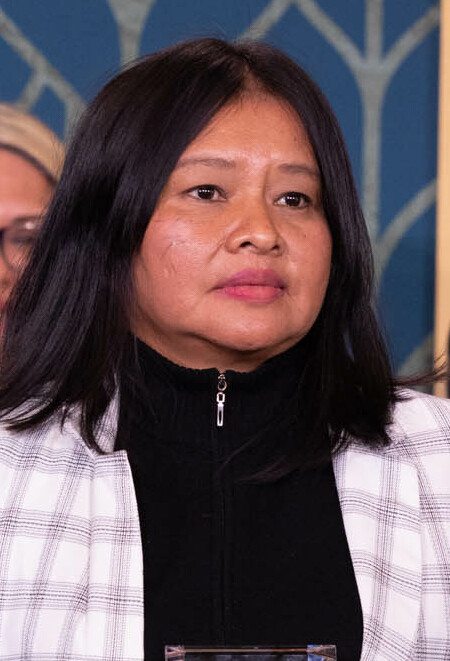
Doris Ríos 2023

Doris Ríos is a human rights activist in particular working for the indigenous people in Costa Rica. She was awarded the International Women of Courage Award in 2023. She is the vice president of the National Indigenous Board of Costa Rica.

== Life ==
Ríos is a member of the Cabécar people.

Ríos has been a member of the Chiná Kichá Indigenous Development Association (Asociación de Desarrollo Indígena) and was the first woman to serve as its president.

As of 2022, under Ríos’s leadership, the Chiná Kichá community had recovered about 700 hectares of territory out of the 1,100 hectares granted to them by government decree.

Ríos has said that little seems to be done after indigenous people are attacked and file complaints with the authorities.

Ríos won the American State Department's 2023 International Women of Courage Award.
