= Cocky =

Cocky may mean:

- boldly or brashly self-confident
- Australian slang for cockatoo
- Australian and New Zealand slang for a farmer
- Cocky (album), by Kid Rock, or the title track
- "Cocky" (song), a 2018 song by ASAP Rocky, Gucci Mane and 21 Savage featuring London on da Track
- "Cocky", a 2017 song on the album Couleé-D by Shea Couleé featuring The Vixen
- Cocky (mascot), the mascot for the University of South Carolina athletics teams, a stylised gamecock

== See also ==
- For people with this name, see Cockie
