= Nairi-Awari =

- Indigenous Territory
- Interactive map of Nairi-Awari
- Country: Costa Rica

Nairi-Awari is an indigenous territory in Costa Rica.
