= Puerto Viejo de Talamanca =

Puerto Viejo Old Harbor
- Town
- Puerto Viejo de Talamanca
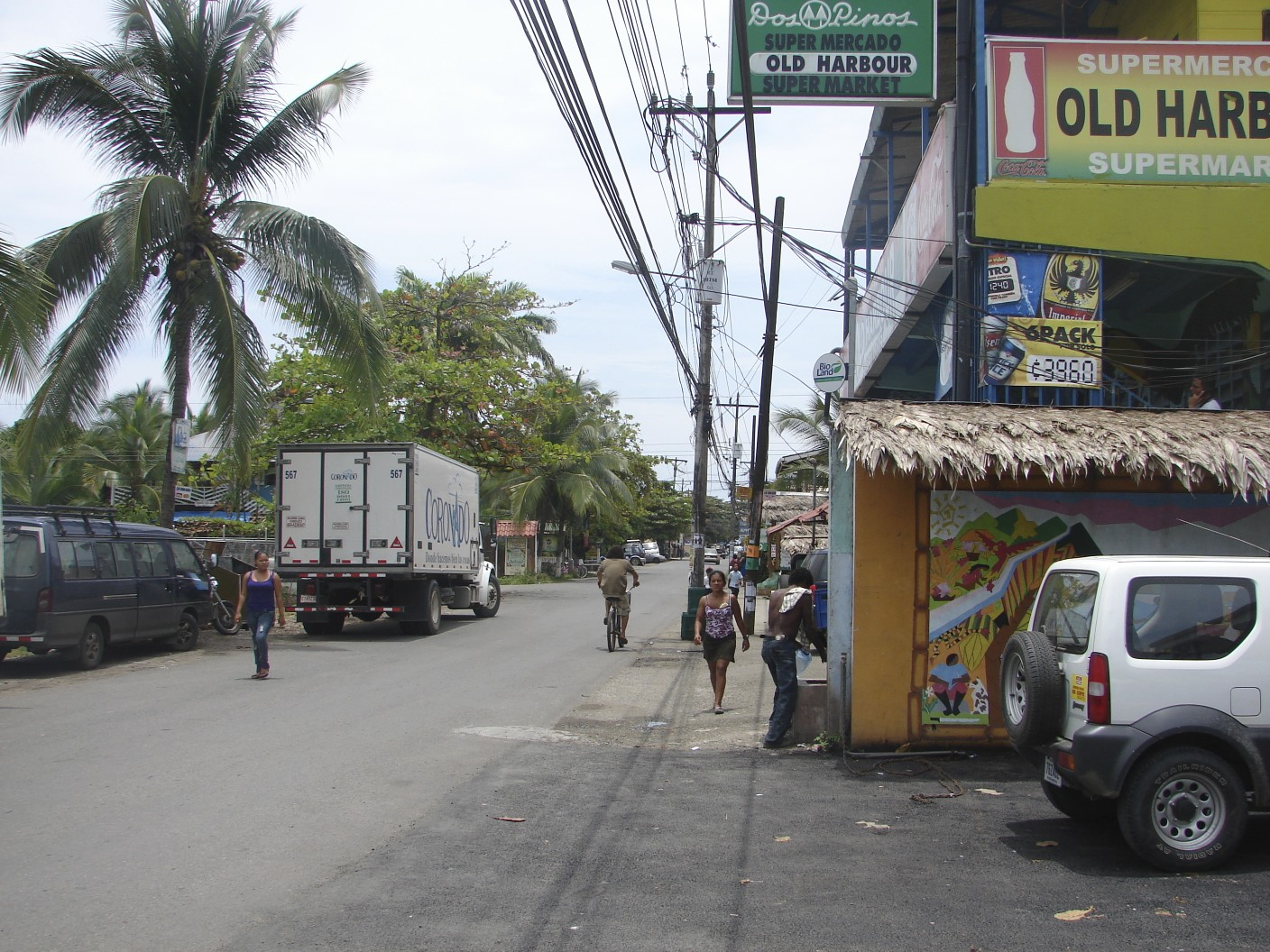
- Nickname: Wolaba
- Location within Costa Rica
- Coordinates: 9°39′30″N 82°45′10″W
- Country: Costa Rica
- Province: Limón
- Canton: Talamanca

Government
  - Type: Democratic Republica
- Time zone: UTC-6 (Central Time Zone)

Puerto Viejo de Talamanca is a coastal town in Talamanca in Limón Province in southeastern Costa Rica, known simply as Puerto Viejo to locals. The town was originally called Old Harbour until the Costa Rican government institutionalized Spanish as the national language and changed the names of the towns and landmarks in the area from English to Spanish or Native American. Fields became Bri Bri. Bluff became Cahuita. There is another town commonly known as Puerto Viejo in northeastern Costa Rica, Puerto Viejo de Sarapiquí, which can confuse visitors. Buses leaving the same San José station for either of the Puerto Viejos display the same destination, "Puerto Viejo".

Puerto Viejo de Talamanca is a popular tourist destination. It is known in the surfing community for the biggest and most powerful wave in Costa Rica, known as Salsa Brava. It is also home to beautiful beaches, such as Playa Chiquita, Playa Negra and Punta Uva, which are a few of Costa Rica's most spectacular beaches which can be found between Puerto Viejo and Manzanillo. Manzanillo is a popular location for kayaking and is 13 km (8 mi) south along the beach. The popular Jaguar Rescue Centre is nearby.

Many tourists stop in Puerto Viejo en route to the Panamanian border at Sixaola. This border crossing is popular with people going to and from Bocas del Toro. Puerto Viejo offers the closest accommodations, restaurants, and services to the border. The small border towns of Sixaola and Guabito, Panama are 49 km (30 mi) south of Puerto Viejo. The townspeople are made up of ticos (native Costa Ricans), a substantial amount of Costa Ricans of Jamaican descent, as well as a number of Europeans who have emigrated to the area.

The outskirts of town and the mountains are home to the indigenous Bribri people. The howler monkey is native to the region.

== History ==
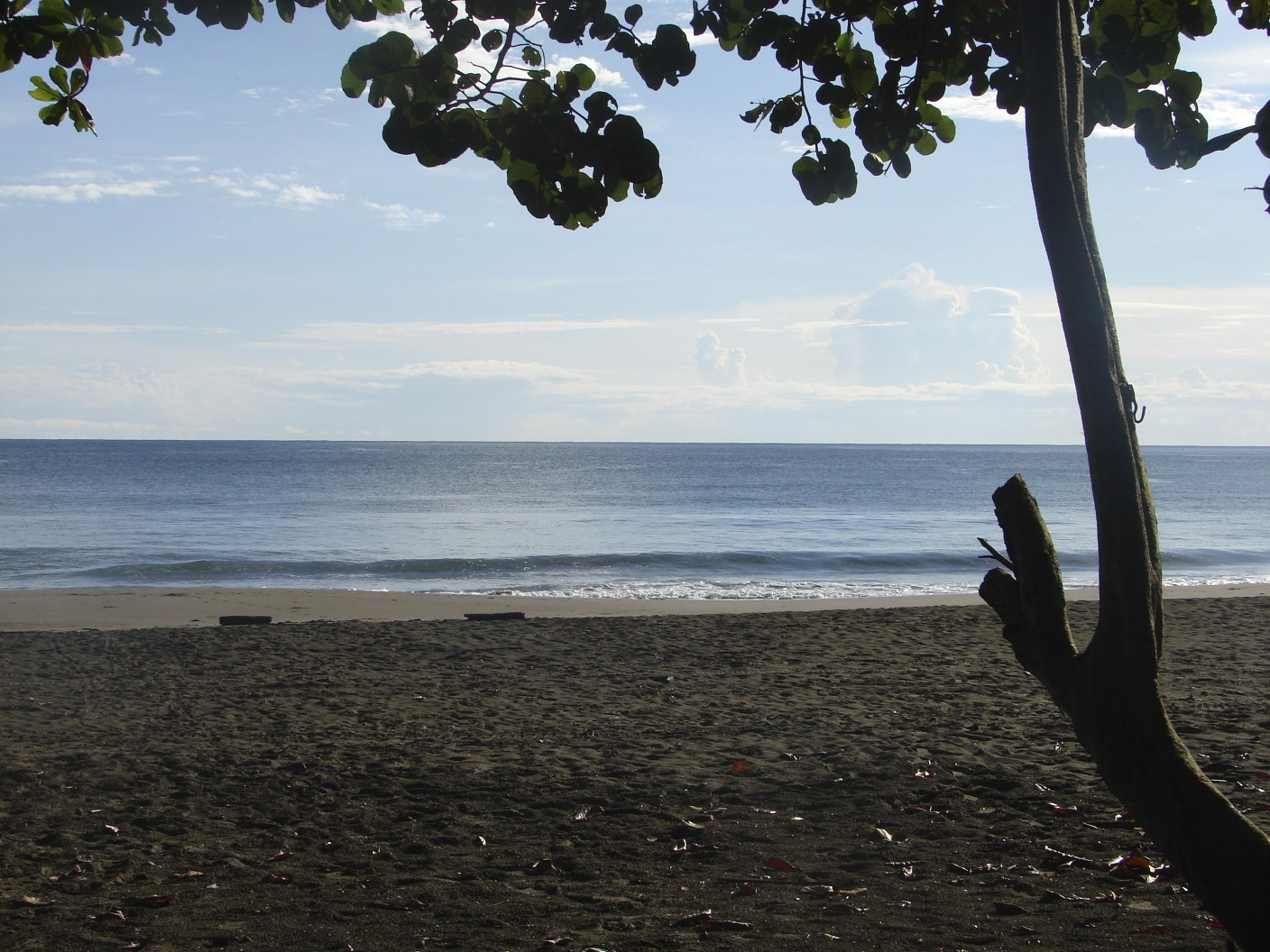
Playa Negra in Puerto Viejo de Talamanca

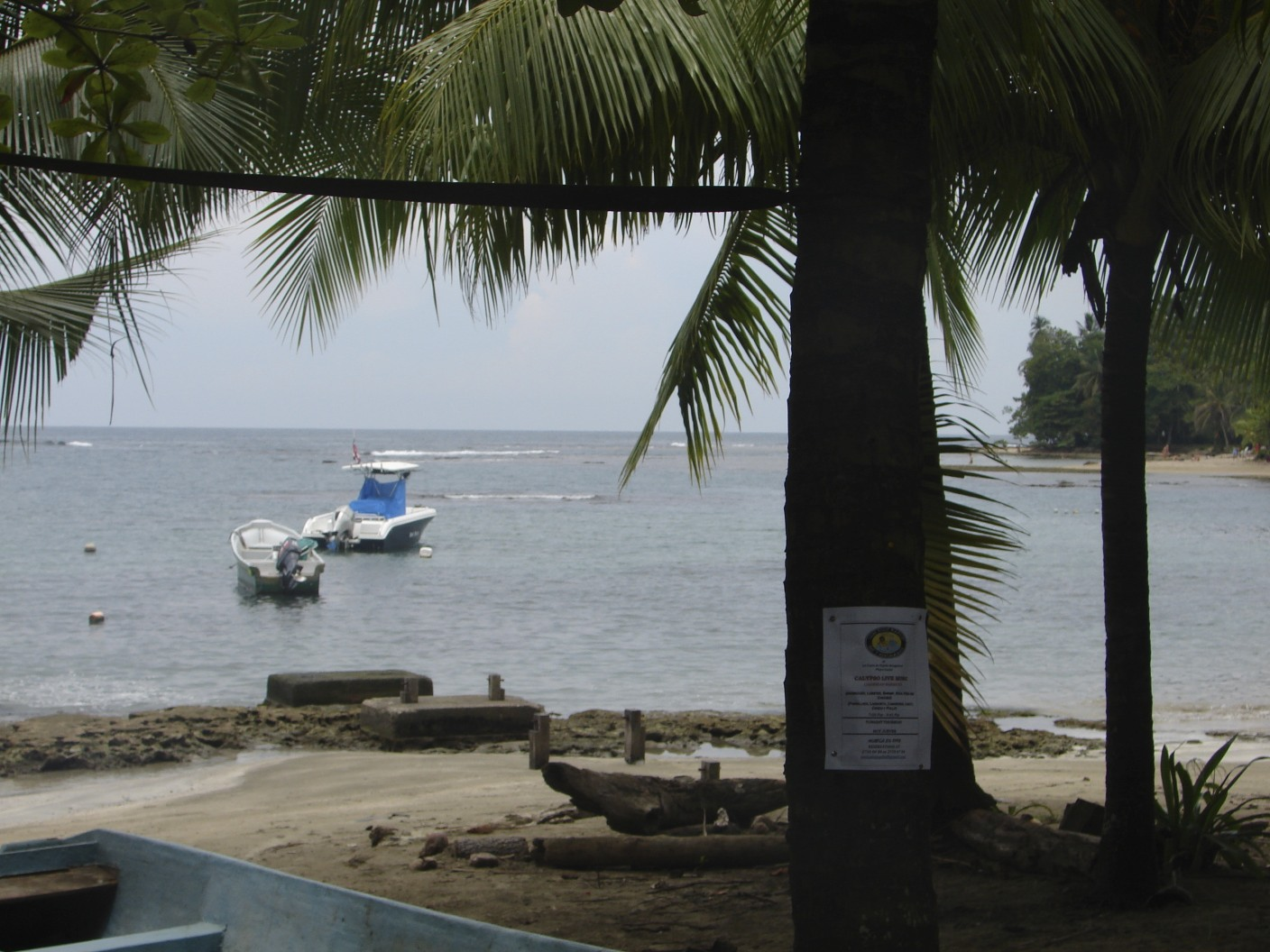
Parts of the reef are visible just off the beach

=== Planned Demolitions (2012) ===
In early April 2012, nine local businesses and residents were formally notified of the impending evictions and subsequent demolitions of their properties, for being in violation of Costa Rica's Maritime Law.

Seventy-six properties (business and residential) have been cited as "in violation" of the Maritime Zoning Laws, with the first phase of demolitions planned for November 2012. There is a complex history of laws and findings that are being actively reviewed and debated by the affected communities. The Vice President made a show of support for villagers in Manzanillo whose homes were scheduled to be demolished.

In March 2014 the Costa Rican legislature approved laws which permitted those residents whose homes were due to be demolished to remain where they were and a law that recognizes the existing coastal towns as well as rectification of the original limitations of the Jairo Mora Sandoval Gandoca-Manzanillo Mixed Wildlife Refuge disaffecting the populated areas.

== Climate ==
Puerto Viejo has a tropical climate. Temperatures remain consistent during the year. Sunrise and sunset change very little during the year (about 6:00 AM and 6:00 PM, respectively). Limón International Airport is 55 km to the north, and has similar average temperatures and precipitation.

Climate data for Limon International Airport, Costa Rica
Month	Jan	Feb	Mar	Apr	May	Jun	Jul	Aug	Sep	Oct	Nov	Dec	Year
Mean daily maximum °F (°C)	80 (27)	80 (27)	82 (28)	83 (28)	83 (28)	83 (28)	82 (28)	82 (28)	84 (29)	83 (28)	81 (27)	80 (27)	81.9 (27.7)
Mean daily minimum °F (°C)	71 (22)	71 (22)	72 (22)	73 (23)	75 (24)	75 (24)	74 (23)	74 (23)	75 (24)	75 (24)	73 (23)	72 (22)	73.3 (22.9)
Average precipitation inches (mm)	12.56 (319)	7.90 (201)	7.61 (193)	11.30 (287)	11.08 (281)	10.87 (276)	16.06 (408)	11.37 (289)	6.42 (163)	7.80 (198)	14.45 (367)	15.81 (402)	133.23 (3,384)
Source: Weather Underground
