= Cabagra =

Coordinates: 9°12′09″N 83°09′38″W

- Indigenous Territory
- Interactive map of Cabagra
- Country: Costa Rica

Cabagra is an indigenous territory in Costa Rica. It is located in Buenos Aires a province of Puntarenas and borders with the indigenous territory of Salitre .
