= Cockle Bay =

Cockle Bay may refer to:

- Cockle Bay, New Zealand, a suburb of Manukau City
- Cockle Bay (Queensland), on Magnetic Island, Australia
- Cockle Bay (Sydney), New South Wales, Australia
