= Salitre (Costa Rica) =

- Indigenous Territory
- Location within Costa Rica
- Country: Costa Rica

Salitre is an indigenous territory in Costa Rica.
