= Térraba =

Térraba Brörán̈
- Indigenous Territory
- Interactive map of Térraba
- Country: Costa Rica

Térraba is an Indigenous territory in Costa Rica of the Naso people.
