= Talamanca Cabecar =

- Indigenous Territory
- Interactive map of Talamanca Cabecar
- Country: Costa Rica

Talamanca Cabecar is an indigenous territory in Costa Rica. It is home to the Cabecar people.
