= Bribri people =

Chibchan ethnic group of southeast Costa Rica

Bribri
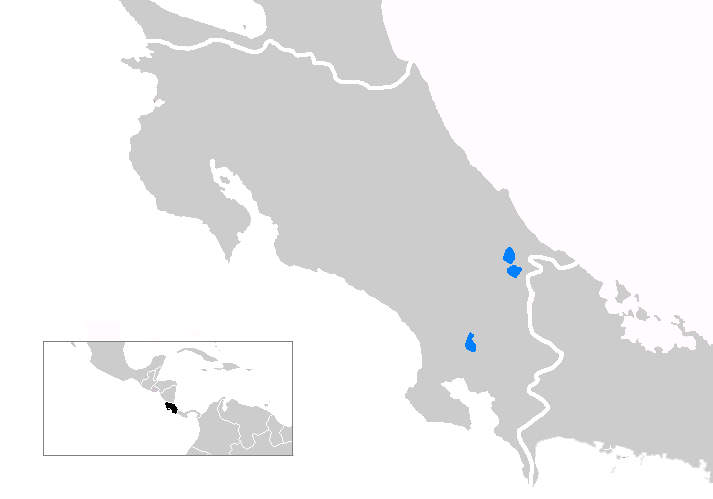
- Map of Costa Rica showing, in blue, the three most important Bribri reserves

Total population
- 12,200 (2000)

Regions with significant populations
- Costa Rica (Buenos Aires, Turrialba, Matina, and Talamanca)

Languages
- Bribri, Spanish, Bribri Sign Language

Related ethnic groups
- Boruca, Cabécar

The Bribri (also Abicetava) are an Indigenous people in eastern Costa Rica and northern Panama. Today, most Bribri people speak the Bribri language or Spanish.

There are varying estimates from government officials of the group's population. Estimates of the total Bribri population range as high as 35,000 people, although official estimates assert there are about 11,500 Bribri people in Costa Rica, and about 1000 Bribri people in Panama. According to a census by the Ministerio de Salud of Costa Rica however, there are 11,500 Bribri living within service range of the Hone Creek Clinic alone, suggesting the total Costa Rican Bribri population is larger. They are also a voting majority in the Puerto Viejo de Talamanca area.

The Bribri historically struggled to remain on their land and preserve their culture, though the Costa Rican government currently recognizes their use of designated Indigenous Territories, and they are one of the formally recognized Indigenous peoples of Panama. Political struggles by some Bribri activists for the legal recognition of further claims to the land they inhabit and autonomy are ongoing in both countries.

== Demographics ==
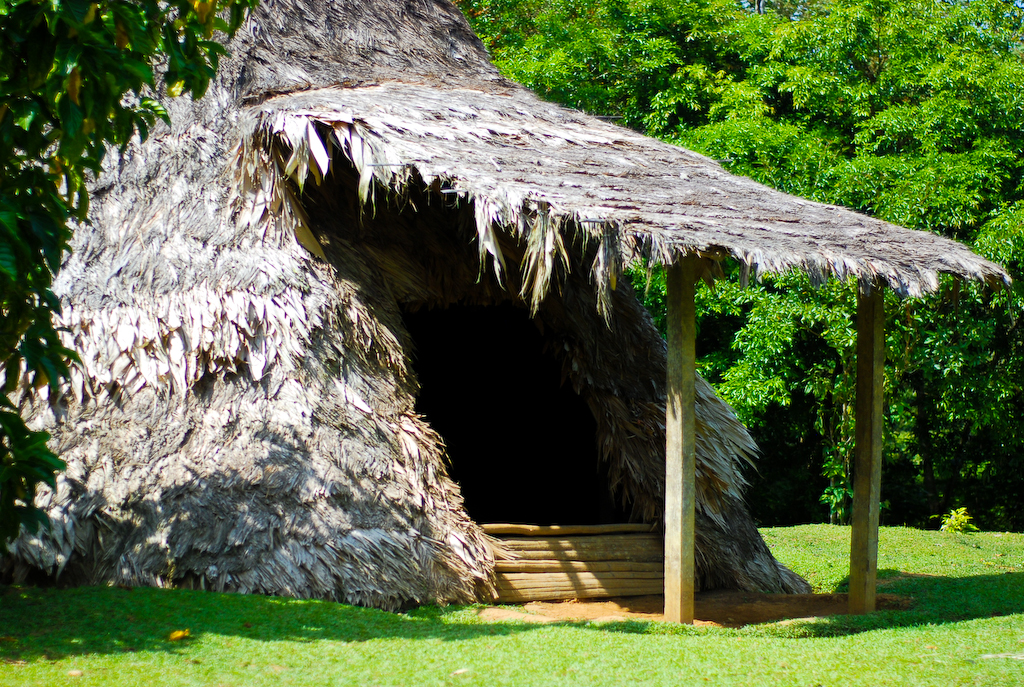
Bribri palenque (traditional house) in Talamanca, Costa Rica.

The Bribri are indigenous to the Talamanca region, living in the mountains and Caribbean coastal areas of Costa Rica and Northern Panama. The majority live with running water but many have scarce electricity. Their economy centers on the growth of cacao, bananas, and plantains to sell along with the consumption of beans, rice, corn, and a variety of other produce.

Many Bribri are isolated from Hispanic culture and the global economy. This has allowed them to maintain their indigenous culture and language, although it has also resulted in less access to education and health care. Although the group has the lowest income per capita in Costa Rica, they are able to fulfill their basic needs by growing their food, finding medicine, and collecting housing materials in the forest. They also earn money to purchase what they cannot grow themselves through tourism and by selling cacao, bananas, and plantains.

== History ==
=== Colonial and Independence Periods ===
The name "Bribri," according to contemporary accounts by some Bribri elders, comes from their word for ”brave” or "strong." The earliest written accounts of their people come from Spanish colonial officials and Franciscan missionaries in the early 17th century, who referred to the Bribri and the neighboring Cábecar as the "Talamanca."

Mission Santa Barbara, in California, USA, one of the missions established by the Franciscan order

Bribri forces were able to conquer the neighboring Cábecar and defeat other tribes in the Talamanca region to establish the Kingdom of Talamanca prior to the early 19th century, while a splinter group settled to the west of the Talamanca range at some point towards the end of the 19th century, although these events are poorly documented in written Spanish sources.

Geographic isolation kept Spanish settlers, commerce, and agricultural practices out of the Talamanca region during the colonial period, as did resistance by Indigenous groups across the Caribbean coast of Costa Rica. Armed resistance by Indigenous groups in the Talamanca region in the 17th and 18th centuries destroyed Franciscan missions and halted the extension of Spanish power. This allowed the Bribri to preserve their language, spiritual practices, and some elements of their culture. However, some Bribri communities which fell under Spanish control were forcibly resettled to the north and in highland regions of Costa Rica in response to resistance by Indigenous groups, ultimately being assimilated into Spanish culture and no longer practicing old traditions.

While able to maintain their political power and cultural practices, the Bribri suffered from depopulation in the colonial period from Old World diseases as well as conflict with the Spanish. Raids by Miskitu forces from the north along the Caribbean coast targeting Spanish and Indigenous settlements alike further depopulated the Bribri and forced them away from the coast to inland areas from the 17th to 19th centuries.

=== The Kingdom of Talamanca ===
By the mid 19th century, the Bribri and Cábecar were organized under a hereditary Bribri nobility led by various kings (often with multiple people who claimed the role), along with a useköl, the highest Cábecar religious authority. The Kingdom of Talamanca received official recognition of its political leadership from the government of Costa Rica in 1867, although the US marine John Lyon who had settled in the region was appointed as director de reducciones, or director of reductions (a kind of Spanish settlement), in Talamanca and held much of the power to govern as recognized by the national government.

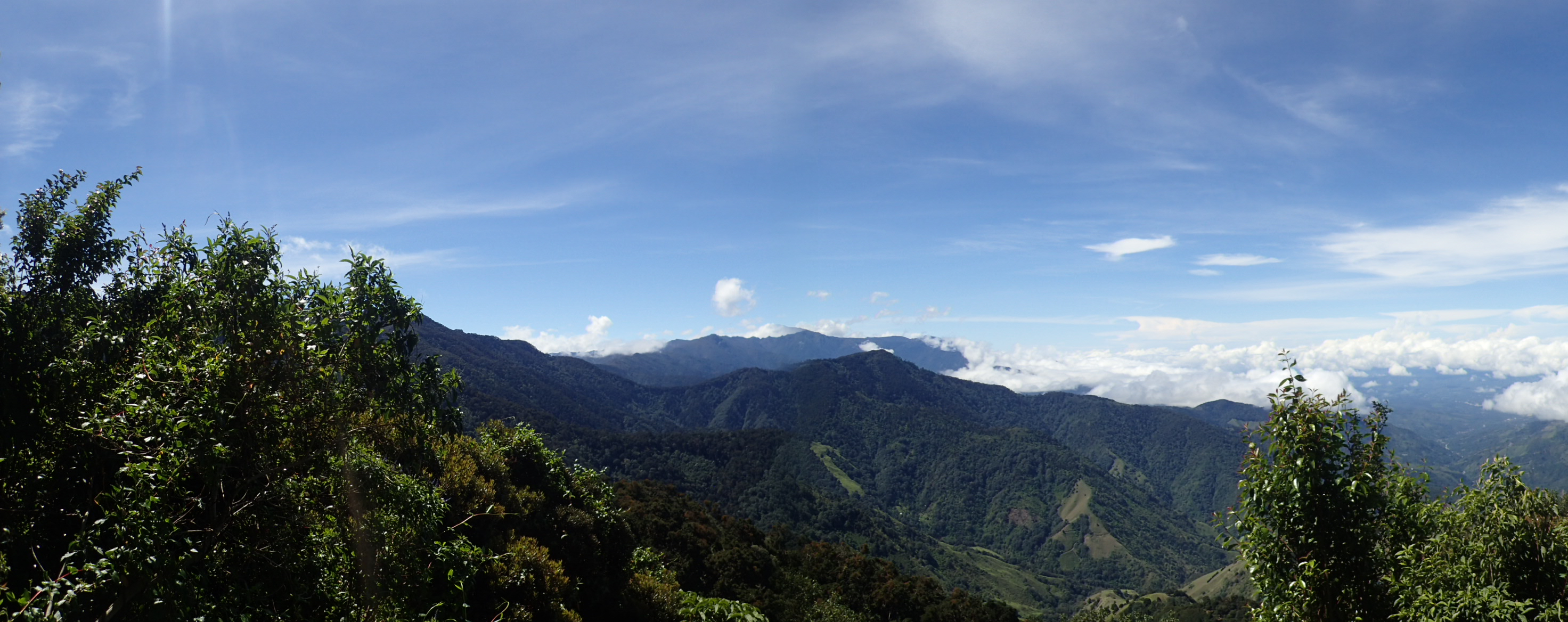
The Talamanca Mountain Range from the ground

One of the last kings of Talamanca, Antonio Saldaña, came to power in 1880 after the previous king, William Forbes, was accused of homicide and declared to be in a state of rebellion by the Costa Rican government, leading to his removal from power. Saldaña ruled about 3,200 people from the seat of his power in Túnsula. Saldaña was resistant to policy from the Costa Rican government which could have led to the cultural assimilation of the Bribri, like the occupation of their land, the presence of teachers, or their service in the national military, though he did not support policy which would have abandoned the region either.

Saldaña came into conflict with the United Fruit Company, a major US-based company with significant control over the banana industry in the Caribbean and Central America, in the early 20th century. The development of United Fruit plantations followed the company's construction of railroads, and as the company expanded north from Panama its railways pushed into the formerly geographically isolated Talamanca Valley and the Bribri heartland in 1908. Saldaña sought to resist the expansion of United Fruit land claims in his territory, but in 1910 died from poisoning, as did his nephew and successor 8 days later. While no definitive proof demonstrates that the United Fruit Company was responsible for the poisonings, many contemporary observers believed they were, and regardless of guilt the poisonings ended the Talamanca monarchy and paved the way for United Fruit's expropriation of Bribri land.

=== United Fruit ===
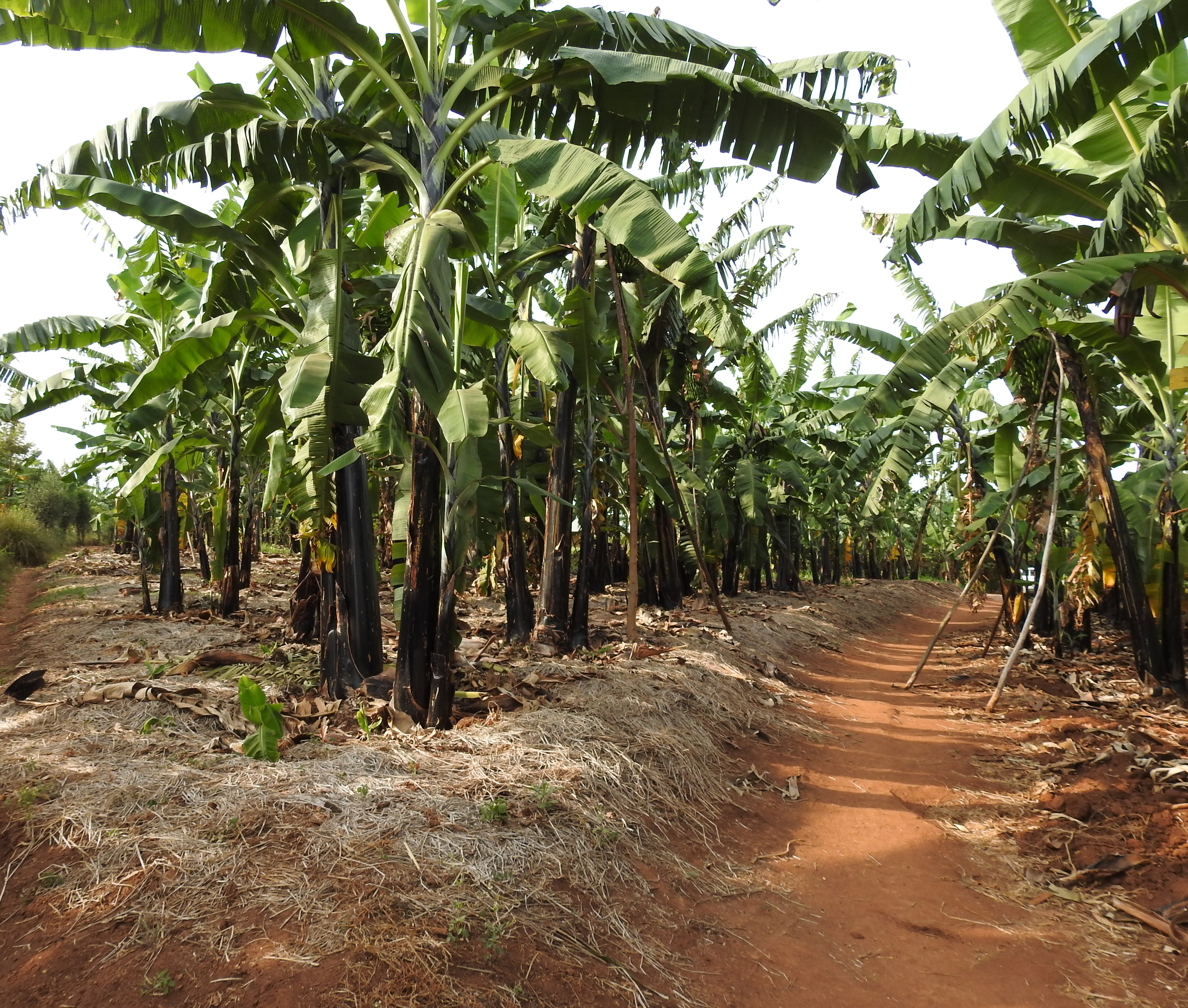
A banana plantation

The United Fruit Company was able to use the legal system to their advantage to force the Bribri off the most fertile lands in the Talamanca Valley. Local intermediaries were able to purchase Bribri land, acting as landlords before selling the legal title to United Fruit. The company could then declare the local inhabitants to be squatters, and by providing minimal financial compensation, tricking people into signing away their legal rights to the land, or having workers clear the forests and disrupt settlements by force, were able to displace the Bribri from their old heartland.

The Bribri remained in the Talamanca region, although forced off lands useful for banana growing to marginal lands where they continued to practice subsistence agriculture and raise livestock. While some Bribri worked part time for United Fruit, most were never fully incorporated into the workforce because of cultural barriers as they insisted on working on their own terms and schedules. However, the extension of their system of bartering to plantation workers and other banana farmers, as well as the sale of their excess produce, partially integrated their farming into a broader economy.

United Fruit's operations in the Talamanca region faced plant diseases which ravaged their banana crops and flooding which damaged the infrastructure they built. While some contemporary studies suggest that United Fruit policy, like monocrop plantations frequented by workers traveling from infected farms which rapidly spread disease, and deforestation which removed barriers to the flow of rainwater into the Sixaola River and intensified flooding, were to blame, Bribri shamans at the time took credit for the devastation these forces wreaked on United Fruit's operations. The company ultimately abandoned its banana plantations in Talamanca in 1931.

After United Fruit left, only a small population of Costa Rican and West Indian farmers remained in the Talamanca region, and some Bribri communities were able to resettle the Talamanca Valley. While the Union Oil Company began to operate in the region, they did not displace Bribri communities to the degree that the United Fruit Company had. The area has remained fairly inaccessible to outsiders and culturally and economically independent since United Fruit left the region. However, some Bribri people outside of the Talamanca region live in areas which have been more accessible and have a higher degree of economic integration with the rest of Costa Rica.

=== Reservations ===
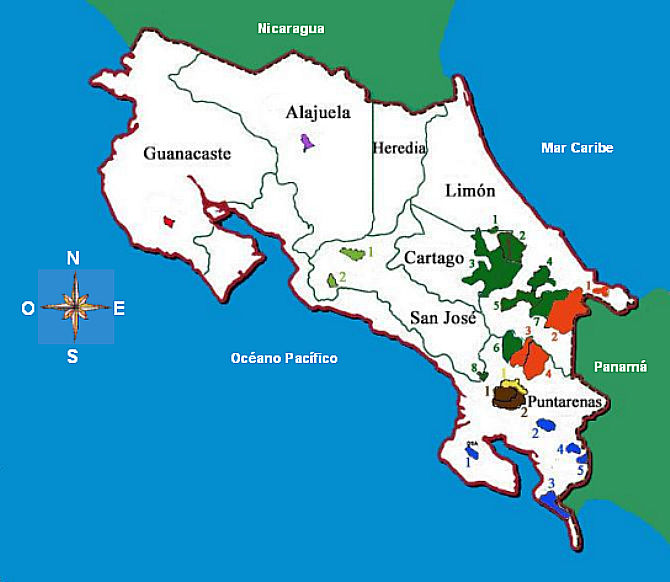
Map of Indigenous Territories in Costa Rica, 2009. Bribri reservations are pictured in orange.

In Costa Rica in 1973, the Legislative Assembly of Costa Rica charged the National Committee on Indigenous Affairs (CONAI) with promoting projects on behalf of indigenous communities. In 1976, President Daniel Oduber Quiros signed Executive Decree No. 5904-G, defining the terms of establishing indigenous reserves. Later that year, Executive Decree No. 6036-G established several indigenous reserves, including for the Bribri, which the Legislative Assembly ratified on November 16, 1977, in Indigenous Law No. 6172. In Panama, while a system for semi-autonomous Indigenous regions exists in the country under the comarca system, the Bribri population is relatively small and as such has not yet been granted a comarca. However, the passage of Law Number 72 by the National Assembly of Panama in 2008 provided a pathway to grant legal title to collective landholdings for Indigenous groups like the Bribri without comarcas.

In Costa Rica, the recognition of Bribri reservations granted them legal title to some of their traditional lands. However, as parts of this territory were legally occupied by non-Indigenous settlers prior to 1977, some of these settlers remain on territory which after 1977 has legally belonged to the Bribri, and have not yet accepted compensation for their removal. This has led Bribri activists and organizers, or land defenders, to politically organize to reclaim their traditional territory within reservation bounds. Some activists have faced threats from the people and business interests seeking to remain on the land which is now recognized as belonging to the Bribri, including the Bribri activist Sergio Rojas who was murdered in 2019, following threats to his life over his land recovery efforts. In Panama, Bribri activists strive for a collective land title under Law Number 72, part of efforts for the legal recognition of collective landholdings which have been ongoing for over 30 years. Without legal protection, some Bribri activists, including King Joaquín González, fear they may be displaced or assimilated by neighboring Indigenous groups or settlers, or that the forests necessary for their subsistence economy may be stripped away by logging operations.

While the Bribri and Cábecar peoples inhabit some of the same regions and maintain similar political goals, the groups have been reported to have a history of ethnic tension, including Bribri discrimination against Cábecar people. Some Bribri political organizers see the restoration of old institutions as necessary for political advocacy, though this is a strategy some Cábecar activists have argued excludes other Indigenous groups. However, Indigenous advocates have expressed the hope that tensions will be resolved through dialogue.

== Culture and spirituality ==
The Bribri people live in the mountains and islands of southern Costa Rica and northern Panama both on reservations and non-protected areas.

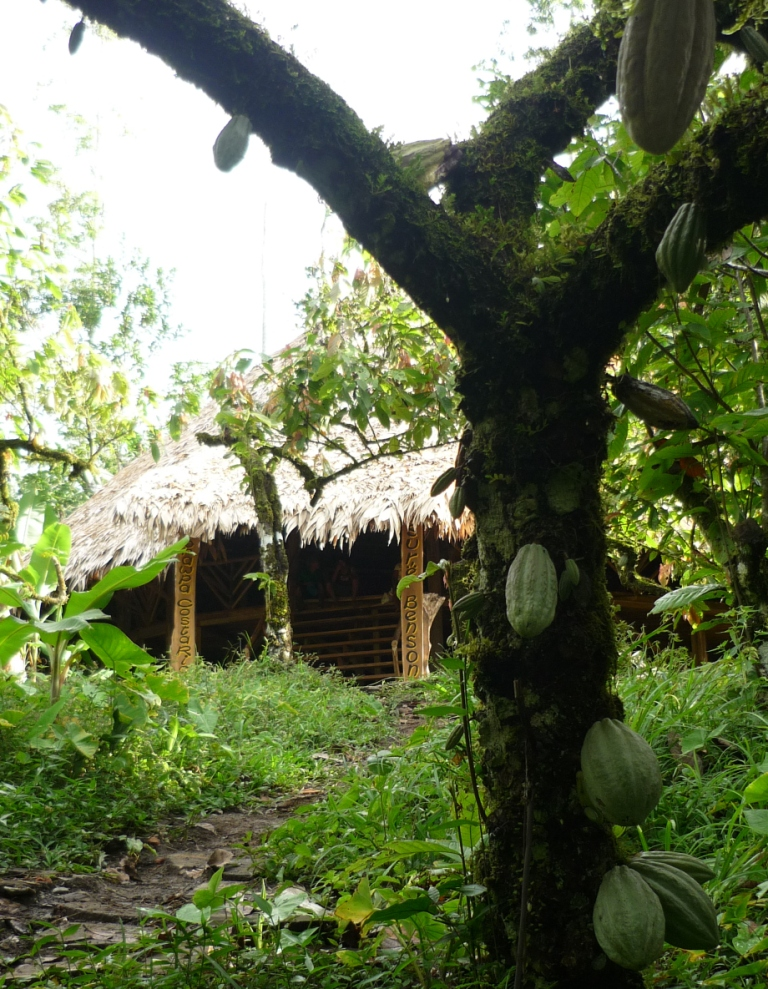
Cacao tree and ceremonial house, Yorkin indigenous community, Talamanca, Costa Rica.

The Bribri social structure is organized in clans. Each clan is composed of an extended family. The clan system is matrilineal; that is, a child's clan is determined by the clan his or her mother belongs to. This gives women a very important place in Bribri society since they are the only ones that can inherit land and prepare the sacred cacao drink that is essential for their rituals. Men's roles are defined by their clan, and these roles often are exclusively for men. Examples of these roles are the "awa" or shaman, and the "oko", the only person allowed to touch the remains of the dead, sing funeral songs, and prepare the food eaten at funerals.

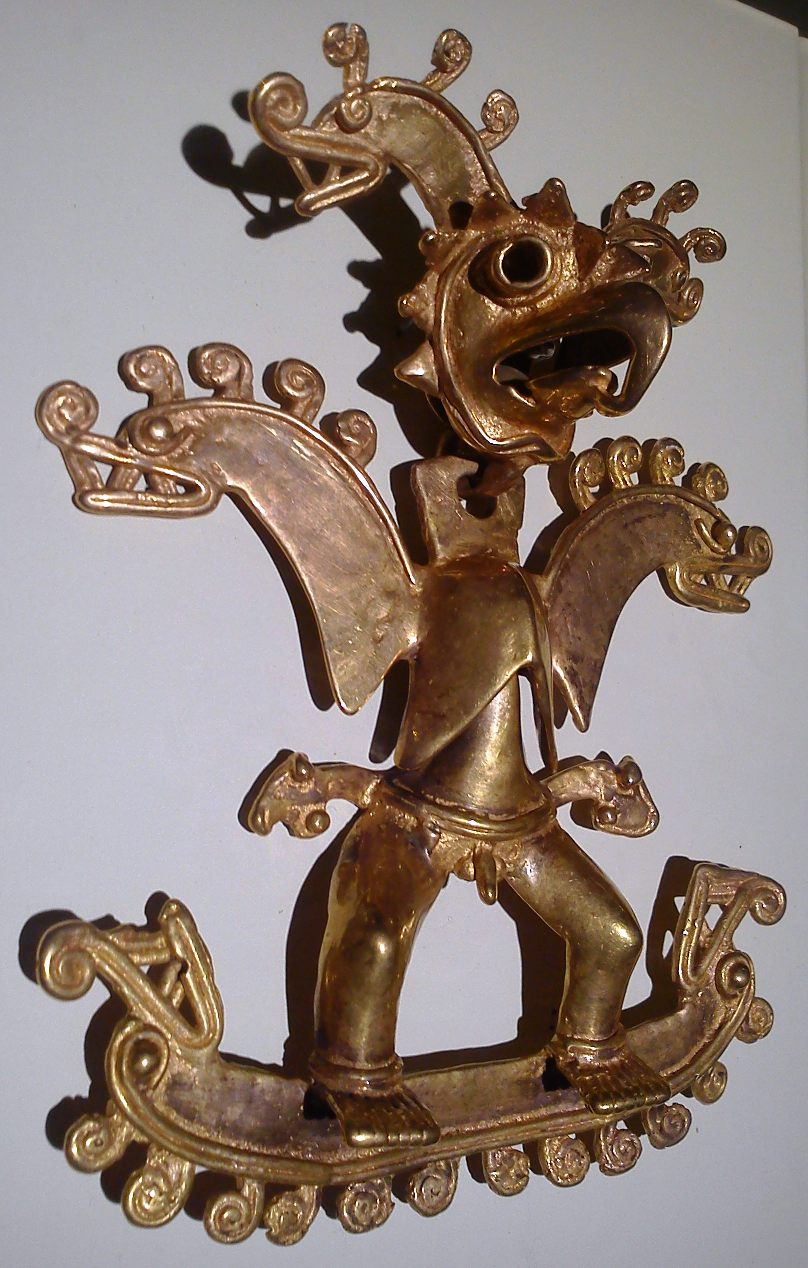
Gold figure of Sibú with the head of an eagle. Museo del Oro Precolombino, San Jose, Costa Rica.

Cacao, as in most of the indigenous groups in southern Costa Rica and northern Panama, has a special significance in Bribri culture. For them the cacao tree used to be a woman that Sibú (God) turned into a tree. Cacao branches are never used as firewood and only women are allowed to prepare and serve the sacred drink. Cacao is used in special occasions, ceremonies and in certain rites of passage such as when young girls have their first menstruation. Currently there exists several Bribri women's associations that produce organic, hand made chocolate that helps them in their livelihoods.

The Shaman, or "awa" holds a very important place in Bribri society. Awapa (plural for awa) train since they are about 8 years old; the training is said to last between 10 and 15 years. Only certain clans are allowed to become awapa. Since the clan comes from the mother's side of the family, an awa cannot teach his own sons, but rather the sons of his female relatives.

All of the knowledge is transmitted orally from an older awa to the apprentice. Bribri healing practices combine herbal medicine and spiritual healing. In their tradition illnesses can come from evil spirits that come in from the ocean in the west, they can also be caused by the person's immoral behavior, or by witchcraft from envious neighbors. In order to heal, the Awa must learn special songs that allow him to connect to the spirits of the plant, the disease and the person. Once this connection is established the awa converses with all three spirits until, with the aid of the plant spirit, convinces the disease to leave the person.

The Bribri spiritual practice centers about the conical house. Conical houses can be found in many Amazonian groups belonging to the Macro-chibchan language family. The conical house is a symbolic representation of the universe. It is supported by eight pillars symbolizing the animals that helped Sibú construct the Universe. The house has four levels representing the four levels of the world, being the ground level the plane we inhabit. On the second level dwell the spirits of plants and animals, and the owners of the rivers, this is where Sibú's helpers live. On the third level of the universe live the spirits who cause disease and suffering and descend periodically to cause grief on earth. The final and highest level of the conical house is where Sibú, accompanied by his helper the king of vultures lives. In this same level live the most malign spirits as well. The Bribri explanation for this is that Sibú keeps them enclosed there, like a warden keeps the inmates in a prison. There are also three other levels beneath the world we inhabit. One of them is the place where Bribri souls go after death.

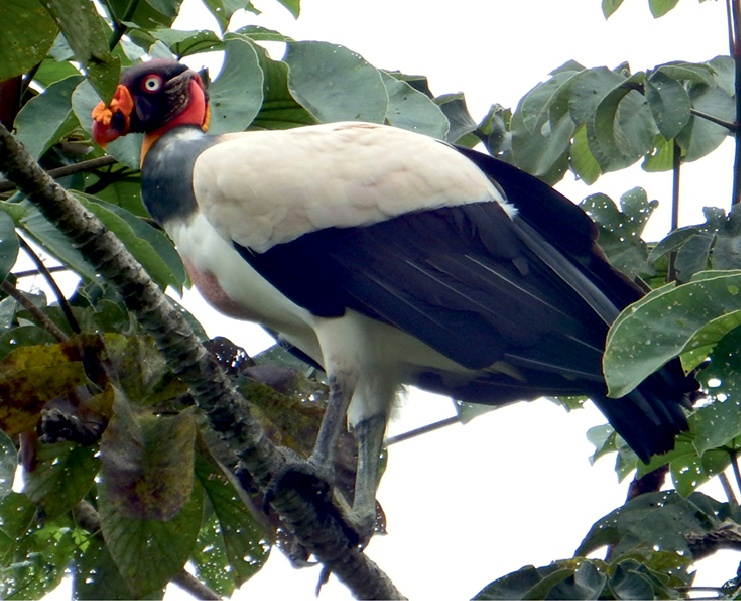
King vulture (Sarcoramphus papa)

The king vulture (Sarcoramphus papa) holds an important place in the Bribri cosmology. He is the only one that can fly high enough to reach the top of the Universe and thus serves as a link between Sibú and the other worlds. It is believed that while regular vultures, who are his helpers, roost in trees like other birds, the vulture king rises up to sleep with Sibú after eating.

Agriculture is the main activity of the Bribri. The Bribri are isolated, and have developed an extensive bartering system. One small group of Bribri, who live in the community called Kekoldi, only has about 200 people. They partake in the unique practice of iguana farming. These iguanas are released into the forest so any other Bribri can hunt them for their food and skin. The farm has been operating for 11 years and has about 2,000 iguanas and 2,000,000 eggs. The iguanas stay on the farm until five years of age at which time they are released into the wild. The Kekoldi have maintained their own culture.

Some Bribri from the younger generation have adopted digital technologies, which have introduced them to new cultural influences. However, some Bribri elders believe this outside cultural influence is a threat to their traditions and their culture which historically resisted assimilation by outsiders.

== Non-profit organizations in the area ==
El Puente is a non-profit organization working with the Bribri people, offering educational assistance, food, and micro-loans. Their goal is to help families and individuals become self-sufficient. El Puente also offers educational working volunteer opportunities, including documentation and preservation of a medicinal plant garden, preparing and serving meals at the community kitchen, and working with local family farmers.

Surf For Life is a non-profit organization designed to connect travelers with community service activities benefitting coastal communities around the world. Their mission is to assemble teams of 'voluntourists' to travel to various project sites where they serve as hands-on workers and goodwill advocates. Volunteers team up to raise money for projects benefiting the Bribri. In March 2010, Surf For Life teams successfully restored the core structure and wooden planks of a suspension bridge up in the mountains. Now the families living on the other side of the river can safely use the bridge again for everyday access to necessities like food and water supplies, school and medical services.

The Tropical Adventures Foundation works inside the reservation. They provide training to help the Bribri create sustainable income for their communities, while striving to help the tribe preserve their language and culture. Tropical Adventures welcomes volunteers and provides opportunities including: teaching English, recycling and environmental education, medicinal plant project, organic farming, wildlife rehabilitation, chocolate factory, public relations and marketing, retirement home assistance, painting, building and general maintenance, elementary school projects, and trail maintenance.

Project Talamanca provides free medical and dental care to the Bribri and Cabécar people of Talamanca, in cooperation with the CCSS (Caja Costarricense de Seguro Social) and local tribal organizations. Under the direction of the founder, Dr. Peter S. Aborn DDS, groups of professional and student volunteers treat patients in week-long visits to the reserve twice a year. Dr. Aborn's team of volunteers is committed to providing free care to patients in the least accessible regions of Talamanca. They are also doing research into viral diseases that are endemic to the area, and sponsoring a scholarship for a Bribri student to study dentistry professionally.

== Notable people with Bribri ancestry ==
- Benjamín Mayorga (b. 1966), football player
- Guillermo Rodriguez Romero (b. 1958), Costa Rica's first Indigenous ambassador
- Antonio Saldaña, cacique and one of the last kings of Talamanca
