= Pre-Columbian history of Costa Rica =

Costa Rica before Spanish colonization

The pre-Columbian history of Costa Rica extends from the establishment of the first settlers until the arrival of Christopher Columbus to the Americas.

Archaeological evidence allows us to date the arrival of the first humans to Costa Rica to between 7000 and 10,000 BC. By the second millennium BC sedentary farming communities already existed. Between 300 BC and AD 300 many communities moved from a tribal, clan-centric organization – kinship-based, rarely hierarchical and dependent on self-sustenance – to a hierarchical one, with caciques (chiefs), religious leaders or shamans, artisan specialists and so on. This social organization arose from the need to organize manufacture and trade, manage relations with other communities and plan offensive and defensive activities. These groups established broader territorial divisions to produce more food and control wider sources of raw materials.

From the 9th century certain villages grew in size, and the latter-period chiefdoms of the 16th century came to develop greater social hierarchies and major improvements in infrastructure.

== Ancient history ==
=== First settlers ===
The presence of humans in the Americas was a much later phenomenon than on other continents. The first humans are barely dated to around 40,000 to 50,000 BC, and it is suggested a later date. In any case, the concentration of ice over the continents during the last Ice Age caused the oceans to recede by about 120 meters (400 feet), allowing groups of hunters from northeast Asia to move eastward in pursuit of great herds of animals. They traveled to North America and settled there in several waves, and over the course of several millennia and through successive generations, the descendants of these hunters spread out throughout the Americas and her neighboring islands.

There is archaeological evidence that places the arrival of the first humans to Costa Rica between 7,000 and 10,000 BC. In the valley of Turrialba sites have been found in areas where quarry and tradesman tools such as bifaces were manufactured. It is thought that these first settlers of Costa Rica belonged to small nomadic groups of around 20 to 30 members bound by kinship, which moved continually to hunt animals and gather roots and wild plants. In addition to the species that still exist today, their usual prey animals included the so-called mega-fauna such as giant armadillos, sloths and mastodons.

=== Mesolithic Period ===
Around 8000 BC climatic changes brought about the end of the last Ice Age. The increase in temperature caused substantial changes in vegetation and saw the extinction of the mega-fauna, through either the disappearance of the plants they consumed, excessive predation by hunter or a combination of both. The hunter-gatherers had to develop strategies to adapt to new conditions, and they continued by hunting smaller species such as tapirs, collared peccary and deer. The new wealth of tropical vegetation, moreover, helped them to survive through all times of year.

It is thought that human groups remained small, about 30 to 100 members, organized in nomadic or semi-nomadic bands devoted to hunting and gathering. However, the knowledge of the local environment allowed them to plan their travels through different areas based on the periodic ripening of certain fruits and the growth of familiar plants (that would later form the basis of agriculture) as well as the availability of other resources. Along these familiar paths they could find temporary shelter under rock ledges, or establish outdoor camps with tapavientos (windbreaker walls based on the cipresillo tree) or other temporary structures.

Tradesman work areas, campfire pits and other fragmentary evidence of life in these groups have been found in the Turrialba valley and in various spots around Guanacaste. The manufacturing of specialized tools for various activities continued, and artifacts from this era such as scrapers, knives and spear tips display differences in form and size relative to those of the mega-fauna hunters.

=== Neolithic Period ===
By 5000 BC it became common to farm tubers and corn, as well as cultivate fruit trees and palm trees. Agriculture emerged slowly, stemming from knowledge of the annual cycles of nature and the progressive domestication of familiar plants. This development occurred over thousands of years and coexisted with traditional hunting and gathering, but it afforded a certain amount of stability. To ensure subsistence of these groups there had to exist forms of collective work and property, as well as egalitarian relationships.

Between 2000 BC and 300 BC, some communities of early farmers became egalitarian societies. The development of agriculture prompted changes in the relationship between humans and nature, and allowed them to feed many more people. Furthermore, the ever-growing dependence on agriculture compelled human groups to establish permanent settlements around agricultural fields. This led to stable villages of huts that had to be erected in clear areas of the forest. The agricultural system most likely employed was slash-and-burn: The forest would be cut with stone axes and spades then burned to prepare it for planting crops. Agricultural practices included vegeculture, semiculture or a combination of both.

Vegeculture (cultivation of plants on stakes) came about by farming tubers (yucas, yams, sweet potatoes) and diverse palms and trees (avocados, nances), in combination with hunting and fishing. This activity was very stable, since it demanded few nutrients from the soil, rarely caused erosion and could be developed in hilly areas. By such means, societies based on vegeculture would change very slowly.

In contrast to vegeculture, semiculture (cultivation of plants from seeds) had a greater effect on the environment, because it required more nutrients from the soil and caused greater erosion. In return, this system had a big advantage: it make food easier to store so that it could be made available all year, not just around harvest time. This led to larger societies where functions would be diversified. The primary semicultural activity was the production of corn, as well as associated plants such as beans and ayotes (a type of gourd related to the pumpkin).

Throughout the 2nd millennium BC there existed in Costa Rica small, disperse villages, non-nomadic agricultural communities that used ceramic bowls and utensils, and tools made from wood, bone and stone for agricultural tasks and food preparation. The oldest of these agricultural village communities (2000–500 BC) has been found in the province of Guanacaste. More recent ones (1500–300 BC) have been discovered in the Turrialba Valley, the coastal region of Gandoca, the northern plains, Sarapiquí Basin, Barva, Herradura, the Térraba River Basin, the Coto Colorado River Basin and Isla del Caño.

== Societal evolution ==
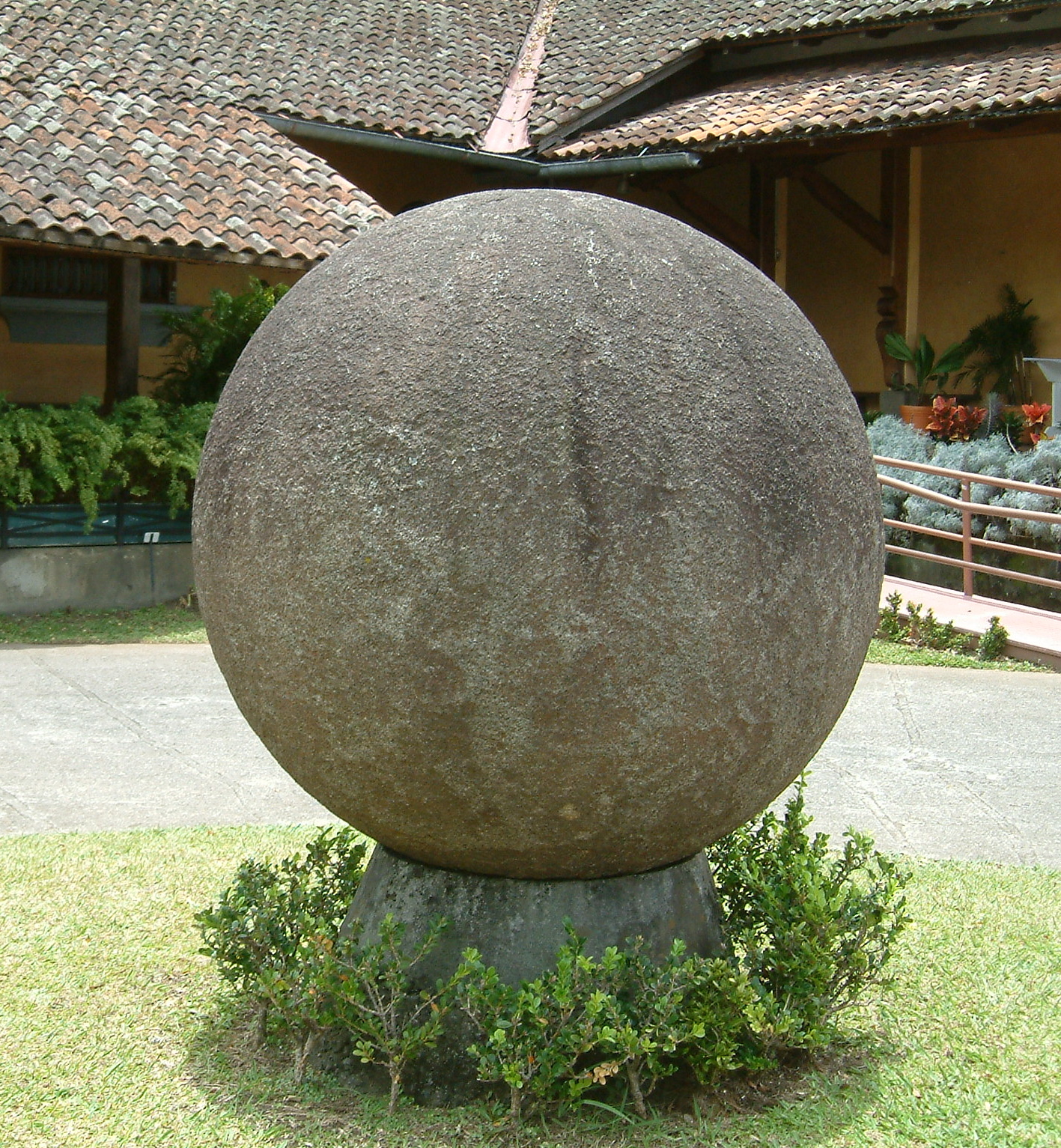
Stone sphere made by the Diquis culture.

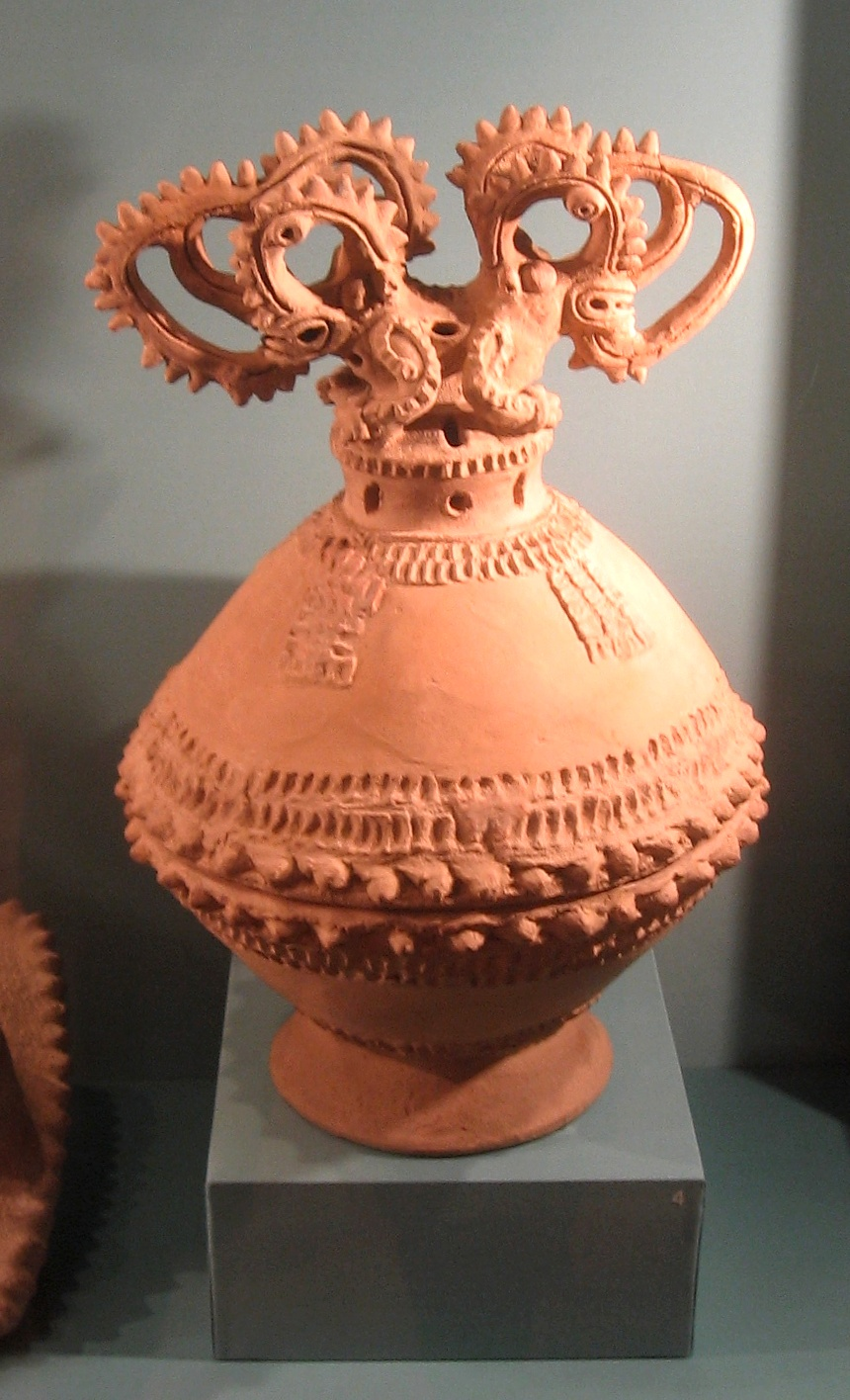
A Pre-Columbian incense burner with a crocodile lid.

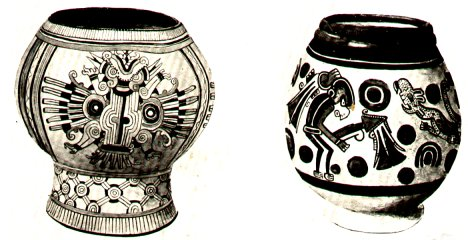
Pre-Columbian Ceramics from Nicoya, Costa Rica.

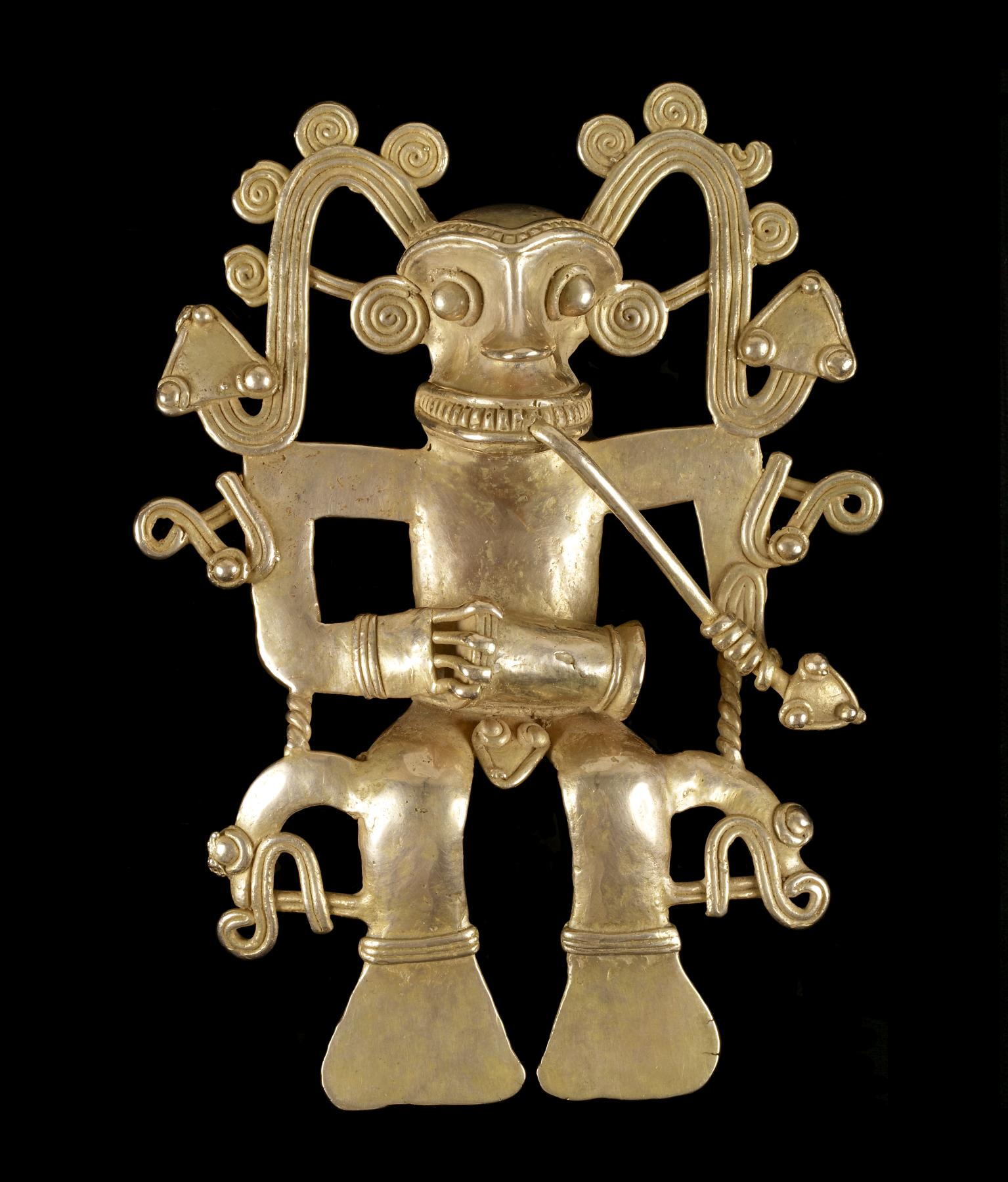
A Diquis human effigy pendant.

=== Egalitarian societies ===
In the beginning, the social organization of these groups would've been of a tribal or clan-based nature, with egalitarian relationships between individuals and organizations, in clans or groups whose members were or would consider themselves to be descended from a common ancestry. Such ties would have served as a foundation for economic and political relations; the leadership would've been informal and ownership of goods would've been collective. However, agriculture, sendentarism and a broadening demographic would've prompted the formation of higher classes of society, and the advent of leaders who built organizations well-suited to manage food production and distribution, calm disputes and so on. Important figures such as the shaman (a kind of priest), physician and witch doctor would have overseen religious and spiritual life.

=== Early chiefdoms ===
With dependency on agriculture came the need for efficient territorial control, to ensure the availability of suitable farmlands and improvement of productive techniques. Soil depletion and the consequent necessity to rotate crops, as well as a steady increase in the population, also made it essential to expand a group's sphere of territorial dominance. Almost inevitably, this brought about the rise of armed conflict with other groups.

Between 300 BC and 300 AD, many villager-egalitarian communities in Costa Rica moved from a tribal, clan-centric organization – kinship-based, rarely hierarchical and dependent on self-sustenance – to a villager-chief organization, with chiefs and elders, religious leaders or shamans, specialist artisans, people of hereditary power and so on. These chiefdoms likely arose from the need to organize production and trade, manage relations with other communities and plan offensive and defensive initiatives.

These chiefdom groups in general established territorial divisions that were more strongly demarcated than those in tribal times, and were able to expand their geographical spheres of domination to produce more food and control expanding sources of raw materials (forests, quarries, etc.). These groups also developed trading networks with other communities and regions.

Other villages grew and became centers of economic, political and religious power. Some studies refer to these new forms of organization as complex chiefdoms. The appearance of these types of chiefdoms also led to higher-level hierarchies, with principal villages and secondary towns. From around 300 BC there began to appear large villages with intrastructural works of various importance (foundations, roads and burial mounds), that indicate a certain centralization of authority and managerial capacity to mobilize communities for construction tasks. There might emerge a primary chief in the dominant village and as well as secondary chiefs in subordinate villages. Among the principal archaeological testaments to this era, it is fitting to mention diverse housing sites in the Nicoya Peninsula, housing structures at the sites of Severo Ledesma and Las Mercedes – and on the Atlantic side, other settlement ruins in Valle del General, as well as the Coto Brus, Coto Colorado and Térraba River basin.

Several archaeological sites in Guanacaste Province are linked to this period, particularly tombs covered in tons of stone. Similar funeral mounds have appeared in the canton of Grecia. In other places in the Costa Rican Central Valley and along the Pacific, archaeologists have uncovered housing plots delimited with rounded edges, mounds, clay floors and roads. In the south Pacific region are the famous stone spheres of Costa Rica, whose purpose is still a mystery, though it is suggested that they may have been symbols of rank or territorial markers, or had an astronomical function associated with cycles of agriculture.

There was a great development in the manufacture of objects made of jadeite or so-called "social" jade (green or off-white stones such as quartz, chalcedony, opal, serpentine, etc.). It is supposed that they were used as personal ornaments then later on in individual burial clothes, since most have been found at burial sites. Deep local tradition in jade-work (which began around 500 BC and continued until around AD 700 for the most part developed without external influence, although some pieces display features of Olmec and Mayan artisanship. Their motifs apparently had religious meaning. Burials from this period demonstrate the existence of rank and class, since burial offerings include artifacts made of jade and other green gemstones, ceremonial grinding stones, sceptre stones and elaborate ceramics. The number, quality and difficulty of obtaining these articles are a means of indicating the person's social rank.

With the advances in agriculture and corresponding social changes, the most successful communities established social hierarchies based on economic and political criteria. Between AD 300 and 800, these chiefdom societies developmented internal social strata, with political and religious leaders, warriors, specialized artisans and farmers. The ruling class could fill functions such as distributors for communally produced goods, military leaders, crisis counselors and so on. In any case, they usually had access to goods that were especially valuable because they were difficult to obtain or manufacture; and they were distinguished from other natives by their prominent living quarters within the villages, as well as the more elaborate funeral rites and offerings their status afforded.

=== Later chiefdoms ===
From the 9th century certain villages grew in size and their internal design became more complex, giving rise to the era of late pre-Columbian chiefdoms which lasted until the 16th century. It is possible that more fruitful varieties of corn and other crops, as well as more perfected agricultural methods coincided with an increase in population, a deeper social hierarchy and stronger relationships between communities further down the social chain. In some villages the caciques or shamans promoted the infrastructure improvements that required the mobilization of immense work forces. There was a notable peak in the art of goldsmithing throughout the country. In addition there was an increase in the variety of domestic and personal goods, regional trade, alliances and territorial conflicts.

At the start of this period, Mesoamerican cultural groups began to trickle over the Nicoya Peninsula, principally the Chorotega people, who subordinated, displaced or mixed with populations that had previously settled in the Nicoyan territory. These new peoples introduced changes in religion, burial rites, art and other aspects of life; as well as new domesticated animals such as turkeys. This period corresponds to habitation sites located in coastal valleys such as Nacascolo and Papagayo; and the flood plains of the Tempisque River and other important rivers. In addition there were other places that specialized in the salt extraction, providing a precious trading commodity, especially for groups that lived inland. Skill in multi-colored ceramic art reached an advanced level; new colors and styles became available to local ceramic artisans, clearly inspired by Mesoamericana.

In the heart of Costa Rica populations became more concentrated in organized economic and political centers, that would form living and ceremonial groups. The most well-known archaeological site of this kind is Guayabo in Turrialba, which contains raised mounds with walls of stone, access ramps and pedestals, as well as aqueducts, elevated platforms, circular and rectangular foundations, paved walkways and other structures. But others have been found in widespread places in the Central Valley, the Caribbean region and the northern plains. In this era there was a great development in stonework with volcanic rocks, to make tables, stone tablets, grinding stones and anthropomorphic figures (women, heads, shamans, warriors and so forth).

In the south Pacific region have also been found great quantities of home foundations, roads, dump sites, plus funeral areas and mounds. These settlements were located in very fertile regions, bringing about the extensive cultivation of corn and cotton, and the use of palm trees (coyoles and royal palms) and fruit trees (guapinoles, nances, etc.). This was the height of sphere-making, as well as of stone artisanship in such works as animal figures, grindstones, grand anthropomorphic statues (which appear to represent important social figures) that featured smooth surfaces. There was an increase in goldsmithing with guanín (low-grade gold) and tumbaga (gold and copper alloy) using hammering and thin-sheet techniques. Mineral deposits themselves were not exploited, as gold was extracted from rivers and copper from outcrops.

== Societal classification ==
When the Europeans arrived, Costa Rica was not a unified land but was inhabited by diverse peoples independent from each other, and whose respective cultures had many different levels of complexity and development. The traditional view that divides this territory between the Chorotegas, Huetars and Bruncas has been abandoned, since these names in fact only identified a small part of the nations that existed in Costa Rican proper at the time. In light of recent studies, it has become much more appropriate to identify two major principal areas:

- The Intermediate Area (or Isthmo-Colombian Area), with Caribbean and South American influences
- The Mesoamerican Area, a great cultural expanse that extends from Chiapas and the Yucatán Peninsula in present-day Mexico to the Nicoya Peninsula as well as its eponymous gulf

There is no strict boundary, either cultural or political, between the Intermediate and Mesoamerican Areas, because there would've been frequent contact and transcultural exchange between both groups of people, over all the confluent areas. Even so, notable culture differences existed between them. Some peoples in the Mesoamerican Area, for example, were organized into societies that appear more complex than those of their contemporaries in the Intermediate Area, having legal institutions which, from a Western point of view, may have been more developed. On the other hand, in both regions it appears the prevalent system of law was exclusively or almost exclusively consuetudinary, based on custom rather than the rule of law. It is possible, however, that the indigenous Nicoyans preserved their legal codes by means of some writing system similar to those of other Mesoamerican cultures.

Part of what is known about these societies is from reports and letters written by the Spanish conquistadors and missionaries, people whose training and mentality were borne of cultural norms very different from those of the indigenous societies, and whose view of them at times was distorted through prejudice, personal interest or mere ignorance. Such documents are not very numerous, and on occasion are superficial, fragmentary or very general; and talk about a very small number of the indigenous groups that existed.

== Mesoamerican Area ==
In the opening decades of the 16th century, most of the people inhabiting the Nicoya Peninsula and the vicinity of its eponymous gulf belonged to the Mesoamerican cultural area. Their presence has also been attested in the central Pacific region between the Jesús María and Tárcoles Rivers. These people spoke Chorotega, and this is why sometimes they are generically designated as such. Furthermore, in the vicinity of modern-day Bagaces, at the mouth of the San Juan River and the Sixaola River basin there were enclaves of groups with Mexican cultural roots who spoke Náhuatl. According to several documents from the second half of the 16th century, the Nahua colony in Sixaola had been founded by tributary groups sent by the Aztec emperor Moctezuma II, who were driven there during the Spanish conquest of Tenochtitlán and decided to stay there.

The Nicoya Peninsula and gulf region were the first Costa Rican territories to definitively and lastingly submit to the dominion of the Crown of Castile, around 1520. The interest in these areas was strengthened by the erroneous assumption that it would allow communication between the gulf and Lake Nicaragua, and beginning in 1522 there was constant Castilian presence in the region.

Much of the knowledge known regarding the life of this region's inhabitants is derived from the chronicles of Gonzalo Fernández de Oviedo y Valdés, whose Historia general y natural de las Indias (1535) includes details from his meetings with the Nicoyan people in 1529. It is possible that many of their institutions and customs were similar to those of the Chorotegan indigenous communities that at the time inhabited the Nicaraguan side of the Pacific. Details of the latter, among those regions administered by friar Francisco de Bobadilla, were more numerously recorded by Fernández de Oviedo and other conquistadors as well as a few priests.

The population of Nicoya was a political, religious and economic center, located a short distance from the modern-day city of this name. (In the middle of the 16th century, there were two other dependencies also known as Nicoya, one larger than the other.) In Nicoya would reside a high chief, who held that post for life and exercised political authority, and would carry out religious and ceremonial functions. It appears that there was prevalently a dynasty-elective system for chief succession. Fernández de Oviedo indicated that this priest had other principal vassals and horseman called galpones, who would accompany him and protect him, and be his court subjects and captains. It is possible that these elders, whom the chronicler describes as arrogant and cruel, represented the various tributary villages of Nicoya.

Fray Juan de Torquemada wrote that the Chorotegan villages in the Gulf of Nicoya area organized themselves into four "provinces": two within the peninsula, Nicoya and Cantrén (Canjel); and two others on the west coast, Orotiña y Chorotega. Other sources mention Canjén, Diriá, Nacaome, Namiapí, Nicopasaya, Papagayo, Paro and Zapandí, as well as the island of Pococi (today known as Isla Caballo).

=== Social organization ===
The Chorotega society was hierarchical, and in the upper social strata appeared chieftains, warriors, priests and elders of prestige known as huehues. The authority of the village chieftains was not absolute, since they shared it with the monéxico, a council of huehues elected monthly and in which there were possibly representatives of various clans and communities. The members of the monéxico were perhaps the same individuals previously mentioned as galpones – since the buildings where the council met were known by that name (surely derived from the term "calpulli") – that were assigned to a neighborhood, village or district among the indigenous people of Mexico. Fernández de Oviedo wrote:

Among the other customary things of these people, one appears just and honest to us, such as when the chieftains are to provide for their armies and warfare, or when they are to present themselves to the Christians or agree to an extraordinary expense. And it is when the chieftain and his principals enter into their monéxico or council, and bestow fortune (after agreeing to what is to be given) to which of them is to remain in the office of provision or of distribution to all citizens, and to make them expand the way that the monéxico was ordered. The governors and officials who are to attend with the chieftain or president in the monéxico are elected by fours for four moons, and those completed, become like any other citizens, and others server in kind; but [the duty of office] is always done by the huehues, that is, the most principal elders.

In some communities, the monéxico had the legal authority to elect or bring death to the chieftain or principal ruler. On the Chorotegan community of Nagrando (Nicaragua), Fernández de Oviedo wrote:

It was not governed by a chieftain or sole elder, but rather in a communal manner by a certain number of elders elected by vote; and those same would affect a captain general for affairs of war, and after he with the others ruled their state when one died or was killed in a battle or confrontation, they would elect another, and sometimes those same would kill each other if one were found to be an inconvenience to the republic.

For his part, the chronicler Francisco López de Gómara indicates:

[Between the indigenous peoples of Nicaragua] there could not be a committee or council, especially in warfare, without the chieftain or captain of the republic and assumptive village. They declare war over borders or boundary markers, over hunting and who is better and more powerful. It is like this everywhere until they capture men for sacrifice. Each chief has for his people a special sign in war and even at home. The free towns elect a captain general who is the most skillful and expert they find, who rules and punishes absolutely and without appeal to the elders.

It is possible that in Nicoya there existed a similar system. In each case, the governor had limited authority and needed to take into account the traditions and opinions of the community. In 1529, when Fernández de Oviedo recommended to Nambí, chieftain of Nicoya, that he put an end to certain rites of collective drunkenness, he received the following response:

... that in the case of the drunken women, he saw that it was bad; but that such was the custom and of their past, and that if it wasn't done the people would not love him well and would hold him in poor conversation, and that he would depart from them from the land.

The monéxico also had the right to elect certain elders of prestige as counselors to the community. These elders, whose activities the Spaniards compared to the Christian confessional, had private consultations, made recommendations to someone who sought his help, and allotted such penances as sweeping the plazas or gathering firewood for the temples. Counselors who divulged the content of these consultations, and third parties who listened to them surreptitiously, were severely punished. These counselors, in contrast to custom among the priests, remained permanently unmarried.

=== Laws ===
It is not clear if the monéxico also had judicial functions. In his work Costa Rica, la frontera sur de Mesoamérica (Costa Rica, the southern border of Mesoamerica), the lawyer and anthropologist Ricardo Quesada López-Calleja indicates that the chieftain would name experienced and capable elders as judges, whose rulings could not be appealed. Quesada also notes that in the case of bigamy, the counselor would dictate the sentence.

The available data regarding the normative organization of the Chorotegan people indicate that from the point of view of Western jurisprudence, it was a system of minimal complexity based on precedence, with minor infractions and few sanctions. On the other hand, it is very possible that they had written norms. The chronicler Antonio de Herrera states that the Chorotegan peoples of Nicaragua had voluminous books of paper and parchment, where they recorded memorable facts and had their laws and rites depicted. Gonzalo Fernández de Oviedo y Valdés indicated that they possessed books of deerskin, where in red and black ink they recorded their deaths and inheritances. So, when there were conflicts or disputes, they could be settled with the opinion of the elders. At the beginning of the 20th century, as a result of a few archaeological excavations on the island of Chira, a square book with hieroglyphics was found that was called el misal chorotega (the Chorotegan missal or prayer book); but it is unknown where this document was used. The sole reference known about this find is offered by the archaeologist María Fernández Le Cappellain de Tinoco, who visited the island of Chira in 1935. In her article, "Chira, olvidada cuna de aguerridas tribus precolombina" (Chira, forgotten cradle of war-hardened pre-Columbian tribes), she relates the account of Fernández Le Cappellain of an islander who said:

Here ... I came accompanied by Father Velazco more than twenty-five years ago, when this gentleman made his expeditions to the island. In a place very near, after five months of expedition, we discovered something very important called the Choretega missal, a square book with many hieroglyphics.

Family ties were very important. The organization of the Chorotegan family was fundamentally cognate or matrilineal. furthermore, according to Fernández de Oviedo, the Chorotega men were "very much commanded by and subject to the will of their women." López de Gómara says they were "valiant, though cruel and very subject to their women". Marriage between blood relatives was prohibited and incest was practically unknown.

==== Marriage ====
Marriage was monogamous and appeared indissoluble, except in the case of adultery or bigamy. Some chieftains and high-ranking people had concubines, but they were never considered legitimate wives. Customarily, marriage required a series of ceremonies. It began with the asking for a woman's hand, that was executed by the father of the would-be groom during a formal visit with the woman's parents. If the request was accepted, a date was set for the wedding celebration. The marriage vow was celebrated with great fiestas, to which the families, friends and neighbors of the couple would come. Before the wedding, both bride and bridegroom would receive a dowry from their respective parents, which may have included, in accordance with a family's economic means, arable land, a dwelling, cocoa beans, jewelry, animals, fruits, etc.

Lands and valuable pieces of jewelry were inherited by the couple's children. However, if one of the spouses died without the marriage bearing descendants, these wares would return to the control of the parents. The father had the authority to sell the children for sacrificial rituals.

In Nicoya and Orotiña, the chieftains exercised droit du seigneur (right of the first night) or ius primae noctis upon request from the woman's family, so that it would be easier for her to find a husband. According to López de Gómara, some native peoples of Nicaragua preferred to give their wives-to-be "to the chieftains who would break them, to be honored more or to rid themselves of suspicion or anxiety." When Fernández de Oviedo reprimanded chieftain Nambí for continuing to have several wives and continuing to spend many nights with virgin women despite being baptized, the Nicoyan chief protested:

... that in [the affairs] of women, he did not want more than one, if it were possible; that he would be content with one rather than many; but that his fathers gave their daughters and begged him to take them; and he would take others who looked good to him, and he would be successful by having many sons; and that of the young virgins, he took them to honor them and their relatives, and then the other Indians would be willing to marry them ...

The wedding ceremony was carried out in the presence of the chieftain and the families of the engaged. The chieftain, with his right hand, would take the bride and groom by the middle and little fingers of their left hands, conducted them to a small house designated for carrying out wedding rites and there said to them: "See that you are good spouses and that you look over your estate, and that you always improve it and not let it be spoiled." Afterwards, the couple would observe silence as they watched a sliver of ocote (native pine) burn. When that was consumed, the ceremony would be declared complete and the new husband and wife would retire into a room in the house to consummate the marriage.

Wedding celebrations would start the following day, when the couple came out of the house and the husband announced before his friends and relatives that he had found the woman a virgin. This declaration would give rise to general rejoicing. In the event that the woman had been delivered to the husband-to-be as a virgin, but had already had sexual relations, she was returned to her parents' house and the wedding would be considered invalid. On the other hand, if the husband-to-be had known before the wedding that the woman was not a virgin, the marriage would be considered valid.

Many men preferred to take women who were no longer virgins as spouses, and even those of licentious conduct. Also, references survive regarding a peculiar matrimonial practice of the Nicaraos, that may have also existed between the Chorotegans: A woman would engage in prostitution to obtain a dowry, congregate afterwards with her clients, ask that they build her a house within a certain time period and tell them that each one had to contribute. When the dwelling was finished, the woman would choose a husband from her among her clients, a party would take place and from then on she would be considered a good woman. It should be mentioned that prostitution, even without marriage as an end, was permitted; and Fernández de Oviedo states that the normal price for a woman's sexual services was ten cocoa beans. The chronicler López de Gómara says that the women "before getting married were generally bad, and once married, good."

The Chorotegans also celebrated rites of collective catharsis, sometimes accompanied by human sacrifice and ritual cannibalism. During these rites, married women, as the principals they were, could have sexual relations with whom they wanted or those who paid them, without later being subjected to jealously or punishment. Under normal circumstances, however, a woman's adultery was punished by admonition, severe corporal punishment and expulsion from the home. Their relatives would insult her and not recognize her, and the community would consider her an impure, shameless woman.

Male bigamy was punished by loss of property and exile. His legitimate wife could remarry, if she had no children through bigamy. If there were any, she could not marry again, but if she assumed the care of the children, she would have a right to the property from the bigamous relationship. The woman who married a man with full knowledge of the relationship's bigamous nature lost all of her property in favor of the legitimate wife. Whoever raped a woman was bound to the house where the offense happened, and his own relatives would have to support him until he paid for the crime with a certain amount of property. If he did not meet this obligation, he would become a slave to her family. If a servant had sexual relations with his master's daughter, both would be buried alive. Sexual relations between males were also sentenced to death by stoning.

==== Economy ====
As in other indigenous communities of Mesoamerica, ownership of arable land and agricultural work between Chorotegans had to be essentially of a collective nature. Quesada López-Calleja indicates that land could not be sold and that parents conferred it to their children or to their relatives, if they lacked descendants, when they felt that their final hour had arrived. Fernández de Oviedo's references to the Chorotegans' deerskin leather book imply that some type of cadastre existed, though is possible that litigation over lands was not between individuals, but groups.

Individual private property existed mainly with respect to personal property. Thieves were condemned to return stolen items to their rightful owner and to serve their victims to repay the damage, and remained bound to the victim's house until the debt was satisfied. If the victim received no compensation, the thief could remain in slavery. A similar situation could occur whenever a homicide was committed, since the criminal had to pay restitution for the wrongdoing with goods to satisfy the victim's relatives, or otherwise become their slave.

The tianguez or market played a central role in the economic life of the Chorotega towns, for which commerce and labor practices of certain complexity had to exist. These markets were tended by women, men were not permitted to enter, except for young people who had never had sexual relations. Men who violated such prohibitions could be stoned, be sold as slaves or be sold as cannibal fodder. Presiding over the markets were judge-administrators elected once every four months by the monéxico, according to Fernández de Oviedo:

... the first thing one does in the city councils, is determining faithful executors for another four months, who all, or at least one of them, never leaves the plaza and tianguez or market: and those faithful leaders are mayors and absolute governors within those places, to allow sellers neither force nor improper measure, nor giving of less than what was to be given or exchanged in their sales, nor fraud: and they punish without remission some of the transgressors by his decrees and customs, and to strangers they offer courtesy and welcome, because they always come more by their hiring.

Although barter played an important role in trade, Chorotegans used cacao beans as currency. Cases of counterfeiting appeared, where cacao would be extracted from beans and replaced with dirt.

==== Crime ====
The religion, language, customs and laws of the Chorotega gradually disappeared as a consequence of the Spanish conquest. Diverse sources from the time of the Spanish domination praise the laws of the Nicoyans and their attitude with regard to the law. For example, in the second half of the 16th century, the cosmographer Juan López de Velasco indicated that the natives of Nicoya were "loyal and obedient to justice", and at the beginning of the 17th century they were still remembered as being ruled by wise laws, that among them there did not exist punishments for patricide, matricide or regicide, because the Nicoyans believed that no person was capable of committing such crimes. The chronicler López de Gómara recounts that among the natives of Nicaragua, which included the Chorotega, "there is no punishment for killing a chieftain, saying that this cannot occur. For his part, Friar Bobadilla reported that when he asked a native of Nicaragua what they did when somebody killed a chieftain, the informant responded that it never happened, "because the chieftain does not communicate with despicable people."

== Intermediate Area ==
In the 16th century, the present-day territory of Costa Rica – with the exception of the Nicoya Peninsula, its eponymous gulf and the Nahuan enclaves – was part of the cultural region known as the Isthmo-Colombian Area, encompassing those territories occupied predominantly by speakers of the Chibchan languages. In addition, this cultural region included eastern El Salvador, eastern Honduras, Caribbean Nicaragua, Panama and northern Colombia. It is possible that in earlier eras, the Nicoyan region had formed part of this area, and that its original settlers had been displaced by Mesoamerican groups arriving from the north.

The Intermediate Area of Costa Rica, upon the arrival of the Spaniards, featured much less cultural unity than the Mesoamerican Area. Numerous communities with different languages and customs lived there, though most languages spoken there belonged to the Macro-Chibcha language family. The culture of some of these groups, especially on the Atlantic side, had many elements similar to those of the Caribbean islands; but in other groups a South American influence was discernible. For example, in 1562 the town hall of the recently founded city of Castillo de Garcimuñoz, located in the Central Valley, wrote to King Philip II that the natives of Costa Rica imitated Peruvian dress and contracting practices. In the 17th century, some natives of Talamanca still preserved the practice of counting numbers of people on ropes with different types of knots, analogous to the use of knotted straps by the Incan empire. Similarities can also be found between the customs of certain communities and those of Panamanian and Colombian native peoples.

There were commercial ties, vassalages and alliances between many of the communities in the Intermediate Area of Costa Rica, but there was no sole authority in the entire territory; rather, a multitude of societies with different levels of complexity. In Spanish documents appear mention of a great number of native groups: Aoyaque, Burica, Cabécar, Catapa, Chome, Corobicí, Coto, Guaymí, Huetar, Pococi, Quepo, Suerre, Tariaca, Térraba, Tice, Turucaca, Urinama, Viceita, Voto. However, references in this regard are too brief and imprecise to clearly identify the various ethnic groups or their specific characteristics. The names of locations and of the chiefs are also problematic, since they sometimes use two or more names for the same place or person, or the same name for a place and a chieftain. It is even suggested that this may have been due to a custom of changing the name of a place whenever a chieftain died, conferring upon it the name of the deceased.

The Europeans took special note of the great linguistic diversity; even today, the indigenous languages that survive in Costa Rica have very different characteristics. There possibly also existed a great multiplicity of codes of conduct. However, the territory of the Intermediate Area was not visited by chroniclers such as Fernández de Oviedo and missionaries such as Bobadilla, and the data that exists regarding these peoples' religious and judicial lives is exceptionally scant, isolated, and fragmentary.

In the 16th century, it appears in the Intermediate Area that a scattered type of settlement prevailed, defined by the existence of hamlets composed of two or three very large, communal ranches, whose inhabitants cultivated the enclosed fields. Some sources indicate that in each dwelling lived "an entire family, clan or lineage." Although in certain places like Guayabo there remain archaeological testaments to the existence of larger settlements, there appears to have been a lesser tendency for communities to urbanize than in the Nicoyan region, perhaps because nomadic and seminomadic cultivation compelled these groups to slowly move around. In contrast to what occurred in other places in Central America, the Spaniards did not manage to find any population center large enough to qualify as a city.

=== Social organization ===
The towns in the Intermediate Area were found to be organized in chiefdoms both large and small, and in clans of common heritage. It is known of several groups that they were subordinate to others and paid tribute to their chieftain; on the other hand, it is very problematic to clearly fix the hierarchical line, because documentation is too vague and imprecise about particular aspects, and sometimes uses imprecise terms such cacique mayor and cacique principal (major chieftain and principal chieftain). In other cases it is difficult to determine whether relations between various groups was of subordination or simple alliance. In addition to the term cacique, the conquistadors use synonyms for principal chieftain such as taque, meaning "chief" or "he who rules" in Chibcha; ibux, which could identify brothers or sons of a chieftain, and uri meaning "master's son".

Among the major chiefdoms that have been identified, perhaps one of the most well-known are those of:

- Chief Garabito (whose indigenous name was possibly Guar-Abito, "the sentry of Abito"; the Diego de Artieda Chirinos and Uclés agreement [1573] speaks of the province of "Guaravito" instead of Garabito) in the central Pacific region and part of the western section of the Central Valley
- Chief El Guarco, whose successor Correque ruled over a territory that extended from the Río Virilla to Aserrí and eastward to Chirripó and Parragua

Both appear to have had an important number of communities and groups under their control. Other chieftains, however, did not have subordinate ties with them.

Although there are indications that certain communities had patrilineal dynastic systems similar to those of the Incas, most chiefdoms in Costa Rica were lifelong and of matrilineal heredity as in other parts of the Intermediate Area. In some communities this system must have been dynastic-elective; it was still this way, for example, in certain indigenous groups of Talamanca in the second half of the 19th century, according to American paleontologist William More Gabb:

The form of government is extremely simple. A family has hererditary right to the chieftainship.... The succession is not practiced in a direct line; rather, upon the death of the chief, the most eligible member of the royal family is elected to fill the vacancy. Often, instead of the son, the selection would fall upon some second cousin of the last chief.... It has been customary that the heir apparent, the future successor, was second in position or vice-chieftain, with little or no authority.

It is known that in some villages a woman could be the chieftain: In 1562, a Spanish captain who visited the Voto community was "well received by an Indian chieftainess of theirs and by her husband who ruled little among them."

The Costa Rican chieftains in the Intermediate Area had greater powers than those of Nicoya; for example, when Correque moved his residence from Ujarrás to Tucurrique, he brought with him many elders and gentlemen along with their sons, "because the place he wanted was settled and nobody contradicted him." Garabito also appears to have enjoyed considerable authority. However, perhaps in other groups the power of the main chieftain over others was not absolute, but was rather exercised in concert with subordinate chieftains. In some communities, the effective authority of the chieftains must've been lesser still, as for example the writings of Gabb in the latter half of the 19th suggest regarding the natives of Talamanca:

In ancient times the chiefs exercised no more than a nominal power over the town. The principal advantages they derive from their position were more of a social than political character. The chief would be brought to the best seat in the house upon entering any home. He would be treated with great luxury and would be offered chocolate, while people of lower class would have to content themselves with chicha (maize liquor). But (in) case of war, the chief would have to defend himself against beatings from long and heavy clubs, as any other ordinary mortal.

In most communities, the chieftain played roles of vital importance. He would channel productive activities, redistribute surpluses, solve internal conflicts and impart justice, manage relationships with other groups and perform functions akin to a priest. His person was almost always sacred; he would carry special clothing and insignias, and would be surrounded by attendants and servants, as in an elaborate protocol. The principal achievements of his life and his funerals were usually characterized by complex, solemn public rites. The social hierarchy depended in many ways on the chieftain's family relations, since a person's rank was determined by how far or close in blood relationship he was to the chieftain.

Warriors and priests typically belong to the upper classes, and also had special clothes and insignias. In some towns, such as those of the Coctus and Cotos, there were female warriors known as biritecas. The Coctu biritecas captured Dulcehe, the sister of the Quepo chieftain Corrohore, who was freed through the intervention of the conquistador Juan Vázquez de Coronado. As a proper name or nickname, "Biriteca" has been freely given to the first lady of the famous chieftain Garabito, as well as the aforementioned Dulcehe, who was later baptized as Doña Inés. Garabito's biographer, Oscar Bákit, points out how absurd these idenfiers were, saying: "Dulcehe was never nicknamed La Biriteca, as such a name would have been an insult to her, since it belonged to the very same women whom she had taken prisoner."

Military confrontations between the groups were frequent, and prisoners of war were sent to ritual sacrifice, even without the habitual cannibalism in Mesoamerican ceremonies. The missionary friar Agustín de Cevallos, when he refers to the many indigenous groups in southwestern Costa Rica in 1610, states that they lived in constant war with each other, because they had to periodically sacrifice some people, "and when they have none, without sacrificing any from their nation, attack those of another [village] and those that they capture are sacrificed; and if they have any left, they sell them to other neighbors for the same." The slaves would also be sacrificed for burial with chieftains or other members of the upper class.

=== Laws ===
==== Marriage ====
The norms on family and kinship were based on a cognatic system, for which the relationship between a nephew and his maternal uncle was important. The family organization was based on matrilineal clans that were supposed descendants of a common ancestor and that sometimes identified themselves as a group with a common name – for example, one taken from an animal. In certain indigenous groups of what are today the Talamanca, sexual relations between people of the same cognatic group were rigorously prohibited, which imposed requirements of exogamy: the men had to look for a wife in another clan. Violators of this rule were buried alive. A matrilocal system of residence prevailed; in other words, a man had to go away to live in the house of his parents-in-law. As a fiancé or husband, he had to work to contribute to the communal sustenance of his new family; thus young women were considered "as advantageous property to their families." If the husband ever became ill, he would have to return to his parents' house; but if the sickness was caused by sores or lasted too long, or if the man were an idler, the woman would no longer readmit him. They did not recognize kinship through an agnatic line (i.e., via the father) and consequently sexual dealings were irrelevant between two people related by exclusively patrilineal bonds.

In the Intermediate Area the prevalent system of marriage seems to have been syndiasmic, although it is not impossible that in some communities there had been monogamous forms of marriage. Polygamy, as among the Nicoyans, was reserved for chiefs and others in the upper social strata. A document from 1763 indicates:

[between the natives of Talamanca] the men did not get married unless they were at least twenty years of age, but the women, if they were good-looking, were usually married at six or seven years of age; so the women would raise them and care for them as daughters in their company until such time as they became useful. The Indians of respect, had by the rich and by valiant gentlemen among others, had a plurality of women, that commonly were their sisters-in-law, which they would elevate to nobility.

However, in the latter half of the 19th century, many men among the natives of Talamanca would have two or sometimes three wives, and the husband had his choice of a plurality of women.

The word used today in the Bribri language of Talamanca to define marriage, which literally means "united hands," symbolizes how simple the ceremony could be, if there was any. A German missionary stated at even at the start of the 20th century, there remained between these same Bribris a type of marriage with barely any formalities, but in which the mother of the bride played an important role:

The suitor is presented at his fiancée's home.... "I have come to spend the night," he says. "I come for a very important matter." In this way the groom begins. Then the cacao is prepared, shared and drunk plentily. If some neighbor visits, the mother of the bride invites him to stay.... Finally, the mother asks the suitor at an opportune moment what the important matter is, calling him aside. If it is convenient to the mother, she looks for a special large serving gourd that she has stored in her farmhouse, fills it with cacao and delivers it to her daughter so that she can offer it to her fiancé, which he must drink by itself. The following day the groom-to-be returns to his house and the mother of the bride barely talks to her husband about the matter, which very rarely changes their decision. The mother again advises the suitor to come to her house.... The marriage is no longer discussed, as it is considered done.

As with other matrimonial systems, in the Intermediate Area of Costa Rica the wife may have had a position in the family equal or even superior to that of the husband, as demonstrated in the case of the chieftainess of the Votos. She possibly also enjoyed greater sexual freedom than the Chorotegan woman, since groups of the Intermediate Area do not appear to have given importants to virginity and there were women who deliver themselves to those who solicited them. At the end of the 19th century, William More Gabb stated that between the natives of Talamanca, "when puberty arrives, it is the sign that they should get married, at least on the part of the young women.... I am certain that very few kept their virginity until marriage."

As is customary in sindiasmic families, there does not seem to have been a substantial difference between the positions of the male and female in regards to the dissolution of the marriage, as suggested by the customs that the native groups of Talamanca maintained at the end of the 19th century: "No formula is required to enter into marriage and it lasts for however long it is convenient to the husband and wife. In the case of infidelity on the part of the wife, or of undue cruelty on the part of the husband, they can be separated. Sometimes, if the woman becomes unfaithful, the husband whips her severely and perhaps returns her to her family, or the resentful woman abandons him. This separation last for one or two years, or may be definitive; but during that time, either of the parties can enter into new bonds and then the separation is permanent."

There are also indications that sexual relationships and living arrangements between men were permitted. With respect to a group from the Intermediate Area in Panama (which was strongly linked to the Costa Rican portion) Fernández de Oviedo write that homosexuals "are not rejected nor mistreated for it. Such men are not joined with other men without a license to what they have, and if they do, they are killed."

==== Economy ====
In the Costa Rican Intermediate Area there must have prevailed collective systems of work and ownership of arable land, though there were positions of privilege for people belong to the upper social strata. No documentational reference has been found regarding the existence of markets, although the accumulation of artifacts in places such as Línea Vieja allow one to suppose that in some places there was very intense commerce. In certain settlements the existence has been confirmed of plazas that could have been utilized for redistribution of goods, as well as for religious rites.

== See also ==
- History of Costa Rica
- Models of migration to the New World
