= Huetar people =

Indigenous group of Costa Rica

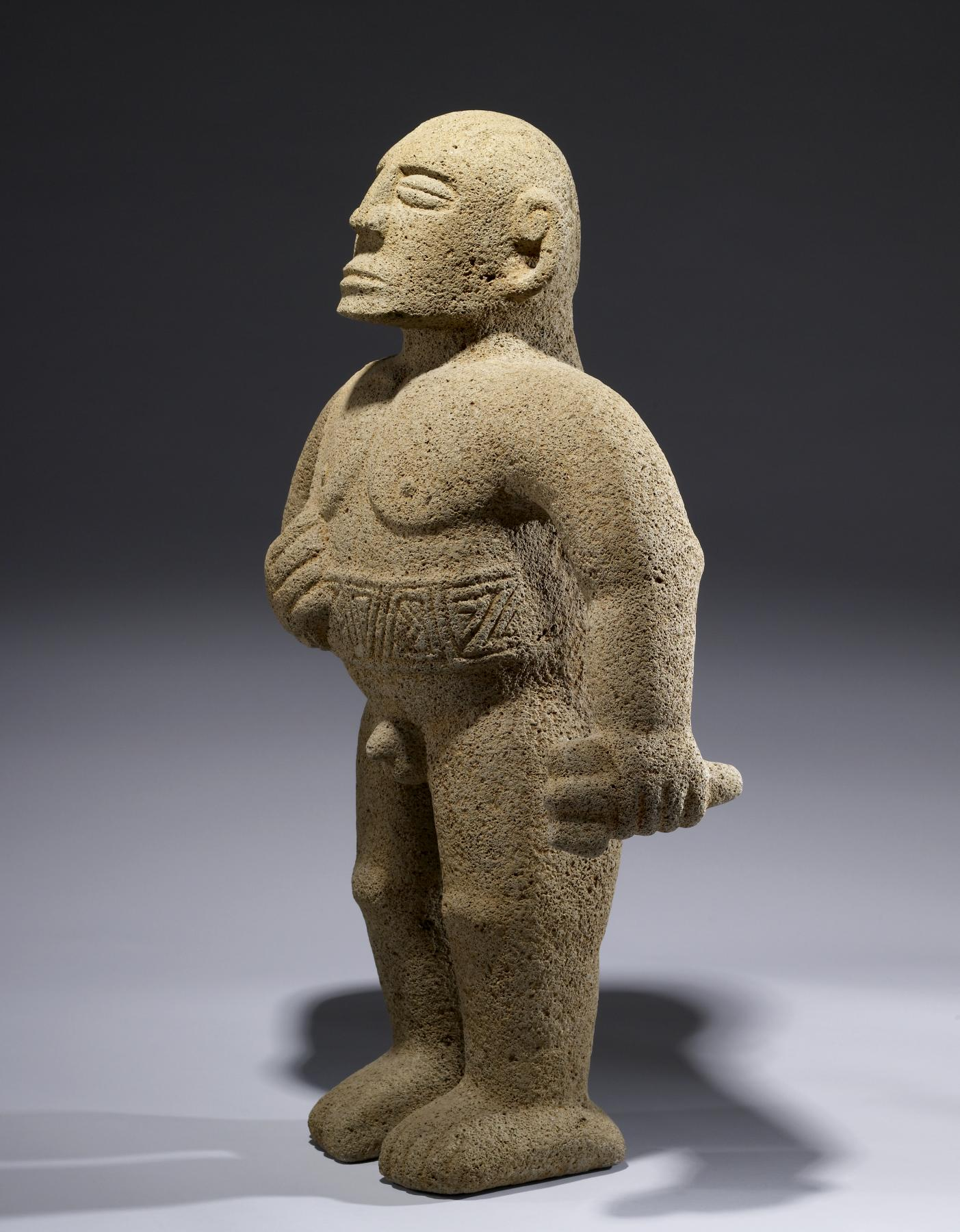
Huetar warrior statue.

The Huetares are an important Indigenous group of Costa Rica, who in the mid-16th century lived in the center of what is now the country. They are also mentioned with the name of Güetares or Pacacuas.

== Etymology ==
The name "Huetares", as well as that of "Chorotegas", is attributed to the Spanish conqueror Gonzalo Fernández de Oviedo y Valdés, derived from the name of two chieftains: King Huetara, chief of Pacaca kingdom (now Tabarcia, east of Santiago de Puriscal) and Chorotega, chief of the area that occupied the Central Atlantic (territory that covered the plains of Esparza and those of the Tivives River). Another theory is that it is derived from a Nahuatl phrase 'huey tlalli' ("great land").

== History ==
The Huetares were the most powerful and best-organized Indigenous nation in Costa Rica upon the arrival of the Spaniards. During the 16th century, various chieftains dominated from the Costa Rican Atlantic coast to the Atlantic Slope. The Spanish chronicles mention a myriad of towns and the kings that ruled them, among them the Garabito Empire, located on the Central Atlantic Slope and the Tárcoles River basin, to the Virilla River and the Cordillera Central; the Kingdom of Pacaca, in the current canton of Mora, and the Lordship of el El Guarco, in the current Guarco Valley, in the Cartago Province, to the plains of the Central Caribbean and Chirripó. Their culture belonged to the Intermediate Area, and it stood out mainly for their works in stone, such as metates, sculptures, tables and ceremonial altars; and the non-practice of anthropophagy or cannibalism. Its language, the Huetar language, one of the so-called Chibcha languages, became the Lingua franca of the country. Although this language is extinct, it survives in a large number of place names in Costa Rica such as Aserrí, Tucurrique or Barva. One of the greatest enemies of the Huetares were the Nicaraos, a Nahua branch that encroached and settled on part of its territory and displaced the Huetar people that inhabited Bagaces, which resulted in tribal warfare between the Nahuas and Huetares that lasted until the arrival of the Spanish.

It has not been determined exactly which Indigenous peoples of Costa Rica should be considered strictly as Huetares. The Huetar language seems to have been a lingua franca that was spoken or at least understood by most of the communities that inhabited the Costa Rican territory in the 16th century, especially in the Central Valley and the river basin Virilla and Grande de Tárcoles until its mouth in the Pacific. These communities featured relatively dispersed settlement patterns; agriculture based on corn, beans and other crops; great refinement in the work of objects in stone (metates, sculptures, tables and ceremonial altars, etc.), absence of anthropophagy, etc. However, there was no political unity between them, and rather there seems to have been a wide variety of relationships, ranging from subordination and alliance to enmity and warfare. Some of the main Huetar kingdoms seem to have been those of King Garabito, on the Pacific side; the kingdom of Pacaca, and the vast domains of El Guarco and Correque kings, which extended from the banks of the Virilla River to Chirripó.

== Modern day ==
A small Huetar group has survived to modern times, composed of approximately 1000 individuals. They are located at the top of the Quitirrisí Indigenous Reserve, on the road between the canton of Mora and Puriscal. There is another Huetar settlement in Zapatón, in the canton of Puriscal, both in the San José Province. There are also scattered families in the area of Cerrito de Quepos and neighboring places. These individuals have lost their language, but still retain some of their traditional beliefs, crafts, cuisine and medicine.

== Kingdoms ==
- Western Huetar Kingdom
- Eastern Huetar Kingdom
- Garabito Empire
- Kingdom of Pacaca
- Toyopán
