= Kingdom of Pacaca =

Pacaca, also called Pacacua, was a Costa Rican indigenous kingdom of the 16th century, whose inhabitants belonged to the Huetar people and culture and whose main seat was in the current Mora Canton, San José Province, Costa Rica, in the place called today with the name of Tabarcia.

The Kingdom of Pacaca was the first indigenous community of the Central Valley of Costa Rica that had contact with the Spanish, in 1522. The news about this town and its king Huetara come from the relationship written by the treasurer Andrés de Cereceda regarding the towns visited by the expedition of Gil González Dávila in 1522-1523 and the amount of baptisms carried out and the gold obtained in each one. After passing through the domains of a king named Cob (which historian Ricardo Fernández Guardia locates in the Tusubres and Carlos Molina Montes de Oca between the Naranjo and Savegre rivers) the expedition continued twelve leagues (sixty-six kilometers) through the coast, with southeast-northwest direction, and then marched into the territory for a distance of eight leagues (forty-four kilometers), until reaching the Western Huetar Kingdom. Cereceda succinctly stated that "Chief Huetara is 20 leagues ahead, 12 along the coast and 8 inland: 28 souls were baptized: he gave 433 pesos, 4 tomines." The small number of baptisms and the small amount of gold obtained seem to indicate that it was not a particularly rich or important community, although it must also be taken into account that González Dávila did not explore further and his expedition soon returned to the coast to continue the trip northwest.

In his work Garabito, nuestra raíz perdida (1981), dedicated to the figure of a great king Huetar, Oscar Bákit raised the possibility that the monarch visited by González Dávila had belonged to the Mesoamerican culture groups, which at the beginning of the 16th century were located in various places in the Costa Rican Pacific, such as Chomes, Gurutina and Chorotega. However, Carlos Molina Montes de Oca, in Garcimuñoz, la ciudad que nunca murió, identifies the town of Huetar with the indigenous kingdom of Pacaca, which was in the interior, near the current Tabarcia, precisely in a region consistent with the distances consigned by Cereceda, and that belonged to the great cultural space called today as Intermediate Area. The belonging of the town of Huetar to the Intermediate Area and not to the Mesoamerican cultural space seems to be confirmed by the fact that with respect to the next kingdom visited by the expeditionaries on the coast, that of Chorotega, Cereceda stated that "... it is Caribbean (man-eating) ), and from now on they are ... ". It is known that both Chorotega and the next two kings visited, Gurutina and Chomes, belonged to the cultural area of Mesoamerica, where the custom of ritual anthropophagy prevailed.

It is possible that Huetara was not the monarch's own name, but that of his people or that of the language he spoke, since the denomination of huetares was extensive to a large number of indigenous peoples in Costa Rica.
