= Toyopán =

Indigenous chieftaincy of Costa Rica

Toyopán (Nahuatl languages: teo-ti 'god', and pán 'place') was the name of an old indigenous chieftaincy of Costa Rica, which in the 16th century, upon the arrival of the Spaniards, was ruled by the king Huedo Yorustí. The territories of the former Toyopán cacicazgo included the current cantons of Vázquez de Coronado and Tibás, in the San José Province, and San Isidro and Santo Domingo, in the Heredia Province. The main settlement of Toyopán, the city of Apaikan, was in the current district of San Rafael.

The cacicazgo of Toyopán was part of the Western Huetar Kingdom, ruled by King Garabito. In spite of this, according to the Spanish chronicles, Yorustí maintained good relations with the Accerrí and Curriravá chiefs, who served the Señorío del Guarco, since on more than one occasion he provided special assistance to the Accerrí chieftain. Toyopán was visited in 1562 by adelantado Juan Vázquez de Coronado, who after quickly making friends with the Yorustí chief, added this territory to the Spanish Crown, who wrote:

The natives are smart, bellicose, older than others. Well mae. Imitate the subtlety of Mexicans traits; they have extremely good cotton clothes, a lot of gold of all carats ... (...) Finally, your majesty has one of the best corners of his kingdom here.

In 1568, after the uprising of several indigenous peoples, the then governor Perafán de Ribera decided to attack several villages to obtain corn, which was scarce among the colonies of the Central Valley. Among these villages were Turrialba, Atirro, Corrosi, Cucurrique, Curriravá, Barva, Ujarrás and Toyopán.

Several tripod ceremonial metates with hanging panels have been recovered from the old Toyopán region. These are andesite monoliths that are considered invaluable archaeological pieces and unique artistic expressions of pre-Columbian Costa Rican art. These metates have become known as the "Toyopán Altars", also called "Ompa-Ontlaneci-Tetl" (nahuatl, "transparent stones"). They are characterized by representing the anthropogenic myth, with a central figure that has been identified as the huetar concept of the rain deity, in addition to jaguars with a lizard mouth, snakes, a two-headed lizard and a monkey. These altars were buried by the Toyopán sukías years after the conquest, to avoid their destruction by the Spanish catechists.

The finding of numerous archaeological pieces of ceramics and stone in this region suggests that it was densely populated.
