= Zeledón =

Zeledón or Zeledon may refer to:

== People ==
- Amparo de Zeledón (1870–1951), Costa Rican botanist and philanthropist
- Benjamín Zeledón (1879–1912), Nicaraguan politician
- José Castulo Zeledón (1846–1923), Costa Rican ornithologist
- José Joaquín Rodríguez Zeledón, President of Costa Rica from 1890 to 1894
- José María Zeledón Brenes (1877–1949), Costa Rican politician, poet, journalist and writer
- Manuel González Zeledón (1864–1936), Costa Rican writer
- Rodrigo Alberto Carazo Zeledón (born 1948), Costa Rican politician, economist and lawyer
- Vicente Herrera Zeledón (1821–1888), President of Costa Rica from 1876 to 1877

== Other uses ==
- Estadio Municipal Pérez Zeledón, multi-use stadium in San Isidro, Costa Rica
- Municipal Pérez Zeledón, Costa Rican football team
- Pérez Zeledón (canton), the 19th canton in the province of San José in Costa Rica
- Perez Zeledon Airport (IATA: N/A, ICAO: MRSI), an airport in Costa Rica

== See also ==
- Celedón (surname)
