= Eastern Huetar Kingdom =

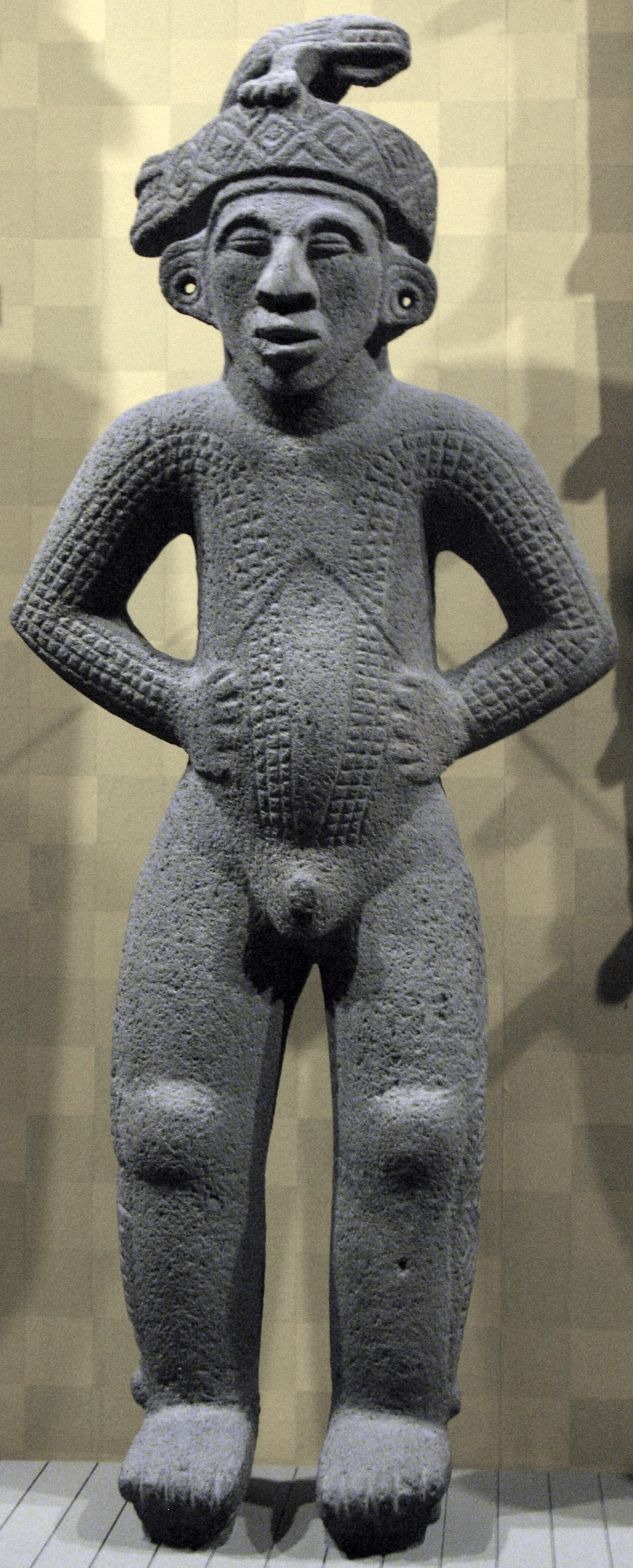
Huetar sculpture at the American Museum of Natural History.

The Eastern Huetar Kingdom, also known as Lordship of el Guarco, is one of the two great kingdoms in which the domain of the Huetar ethnic group was divided in the Central Valley of Costa Rica and at the time of the conquest the king was Correque, son of the feared chieftain El Guarco. Although smaller than the fellow Huetar nation, the Western Huetar Kingdom ruled by Garabito as part of its larger empire. The eastern Huetar territory extended from the banks of the Virilla River to the slopes of the Chirripó in the Tierradentro. The area of the modern Paraiso Canton was governed by the vassal chiefs Abituri and Turichiqui, in addition there were aboriginal settlements in Ujarrás and Orosi that were visited by the Spaniard Ignacio Cota in 1561.

In the illegal distribution carried out by Perafán de Ribera in 1569, two geographical areas were described in which the eastern orchard tribes were grouped; Big Turriarva and Small Turriarva. The first included the current towns of Aquiares, Colorado, Santa Cruz, with their main chiefs Tabaco and Hurrea; and the second constituted the present towns of Margot, Azul, Jesús María, Alto Varal, Cimarrones and Lajas.
