= Metropolitana Region =

Region I-Metropolitana
- Region
- I-Metropolitana Region
- Country: Mexico
- State: Chiapas
- Largest city: Tuxtla Gutiérrez

Area
  - Total: 1,800 km^{2} (690 sq mi)

Population (2025)
  - Total: 837,860
- Time zone: UTC−06:00 (Zona Centro)

The Metropolitana region is one of the regions of the Mexican state of Chiapas.. It has a population of 837,860 people as of 2025, .

== Municipalities ==
Municipality code	Name	Population		Land Area			Population density	
Municipality code	Name	2025	Rank	km^{2}	sq mi	Rank	2025	Rank
012	Berriozábal	69,405	3	351.7	135.8	2	197/km^{2} (511/sq mi)	2
027	Chiapa de Corzo	123,958	2	829.98	320.46	1	149/km^{2} (387/sq mi)	3
086	Suchiapa	26,998	4	283.66	109.52	4	95/km^{2} (247/sq mi)	4
101	Tuxtla Gutiérrez	617,499	1	334.61	129.19	3	1,845/km^{2} (4,780/sq mi)	1
	Metropolitana Region	837,860	—	1,800	694.98	—	465/km^{2} (1,206/sq mi)	—
Source: INEGI
