= Western Huetar Kingdom =

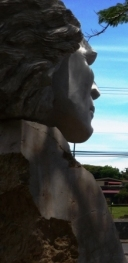
Statue of Barbak, a Huetar chieftain and Garabito's vassal whose name gives the current name to the Barva Canton.

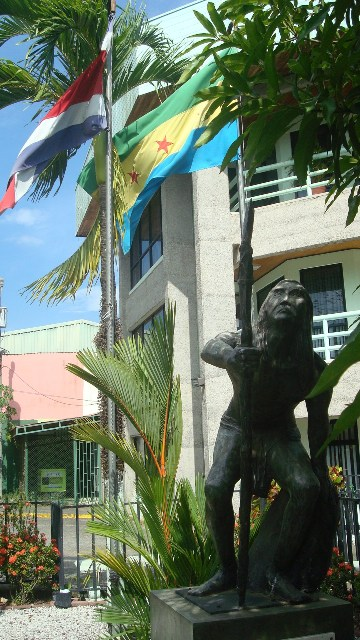
Garabito statue in the Garabito Canton City Hall

The Western Huetar Kingdom, also called Lordship of Garabito, Kingdom of Garabito or Cacicazgo of Garabito, was an Amerindian nation located in Costa Rica. It was one of the two great indigenous kingdoms of the central part of the country, the other was the Eastern Huetar Kingdom or Lordship of El Guarco. The empire, domain or lordship of King Garabito was a vast territory controlled by the Huetar king Garabito and that extended through most of the Central Valley of Costa Rica from the Virilla River (natural border with the also Huetar but smaller Señorío del Guarco) in modern San José to the Atlantic Slope in what is now the north of the country (Alajuela, Grecia and San Carlos mainly). Garabito's domain transcended the borders of the Western Huetar Kingdom where it had multiple vassal populations such as Coyoche, Abacara, Chucasque, Cobobici (possibly Corobicí), Cobux, Yurustí and Barva, and also included several submissive peoples but not incorporated into their kingdom; the Botos, Tises and Catapas.

It was located in the Central Valley of Costa Rica, spanning from the Pacific coast to the west bank of the Virilla River, following the Tárcoles river basin. Although the exact location of its capital is unknown, it is speculated that it could be in San Ramón near where it made war raids against the Botos. The empire was also an enemy of the Kingdom of Nicoya of the Chorotega people to the west. Another enemy of the empire was the Nicarao people who encroached and settled on part of its territory and displaced the Huetares that inhabited Bagaces, sparking a tribal war between the two.

At the time of the arrival of the Spaniards to Costa Rica, in the 16th century, the main towns were located in the plains of Esparza, Orotina and San Mateo, where King Garabito had his capital, who was the most important leader to sit during the Spanish conquest, in a place known as the Coyoche Valley, on the banks of the Susubres River, the current canton of San Mateo. At the time of contact, the nearby Kingdom of the Botos, located in the plains north of the Central Volcanic Mountain Range, paid tribute to the West.

Garabito presented a fierce resistance to the Spanish conquering expansions, considerably delaying the process of conquest and colonization and causing many headaches to the Spanish governors such as Juan de Cavallón and Vázquez de Coronado, but he would finally be defeated and his domain annexed to the governorship of Costa Rica under the name that the Spanish designated as Garabito province.
