= Kingdom of Nicoya =

Historic kingdom in Guanacaste, Costa Rica

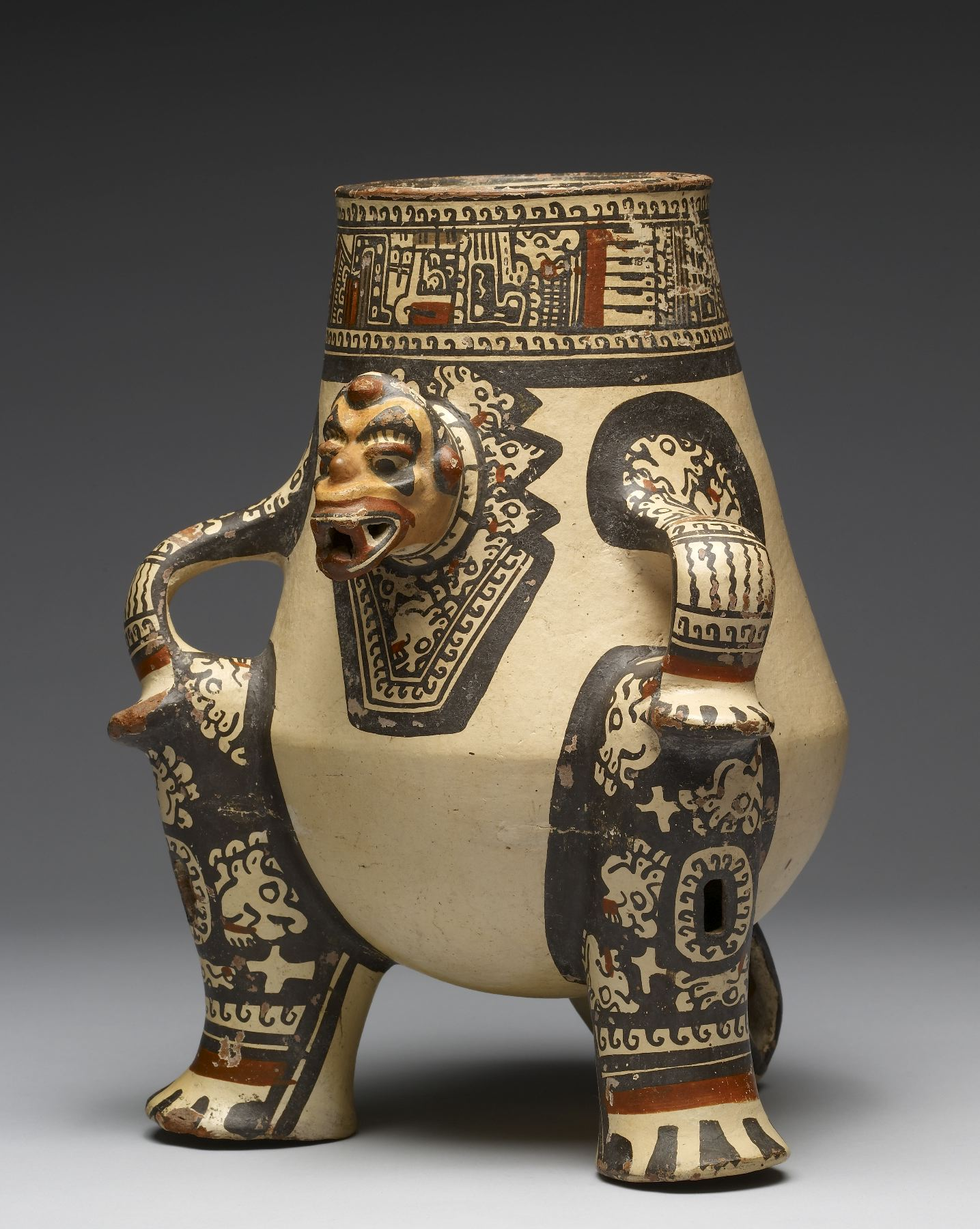
Nicoyan pottery.

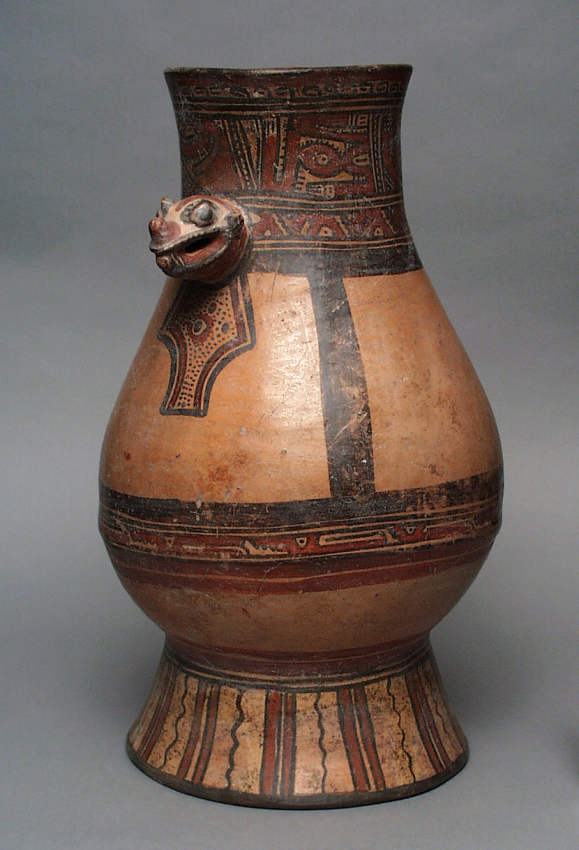
Mesoamerican-style Nicoyan pottery at the Los Angeles Art Museum.

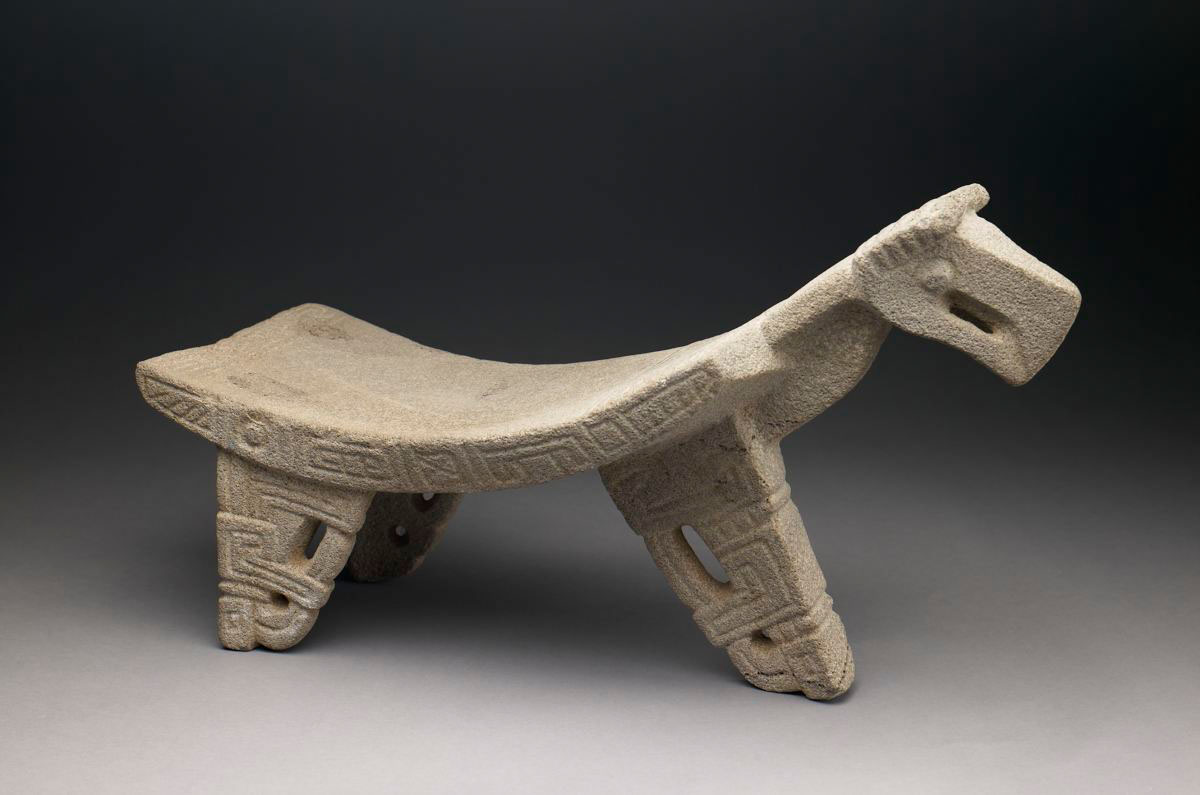
Ceremonial Nicoyan metate

The Kingdom of Nicoya (from Nahuatl: Nekok Yaotl), also called Cacicazgo or Lordship of Nicoya, was an indigenous nation that comprised much of the territory of the current Guanacaste Province, in the North Pacific of Costa Rica. Its political, economic and religious center was the city of Nicoya, located on the peninsula of the same name, which depends on several provinces located on both banks of the Gulf of Nicoya, as well as numerous tributary villages. In the 16th century, prior to the arrival of Europeans, Nicoya was the most important chiefdom of the North Pacific of present-day Costa Rica.

== Region ==
The Nicoya region is located on the southern border of Mesoamerica, when it was occupied in 800 AD. C. by immigrant groups that come from the north, from the Valley of Mexico, and that had been under the domination of "Olmecs" (likely the Olmeca-Xicallanca). These groups, known as Chorotegas, are installed in the Isthmus of Rivas, in Nicaragua, and much of the territory of Guanacaste, especially the Nicoya Peninsula, displacing cultural groups from the Intermediate Area. The successive entrances of the Nicaraos, the Rivas Isthmus, produced, in turn, the Chorotegas moved and occupied, the islands and the eastern band of the Gulf of Nicoya, which caused them to come into contact and exert cultural influence on the groups of Native Americans from central and southern Costa Rica, which are located in the Mesoamerica area, but without eliminating local bases.

== History ==
In archaeological terms, the territory of Guanacaste is part of the archeological region of Greater Nicoya, which extends from the Gulf of Fonseca in Honduras, covering the entire Pacific of Nicaragua, to the northern Pacific of Costa Rica. The Greater Nicoya has been divided, for its study, into two subregions: the northern or Nicaraguan subregion (Nicaragua Pacific) and the southern subregion or Guanacaste (Nicoya Peninsula, the Tempisque river basin, the piedmont and the highlands of the Guanacaste and Tilarán mountain ranges in Costa Rica). In this last subregion is the Kingdom of Nicoya.

In the Greater Nicoya there was a constituted cultural center that flourished for approximately 2000 years. Archaeological research shows that the Nicoyan society achieved a complex social organization and a high degree of cultural development. Upon the arrival of the Spaniards into Nicoya in the 16th century, they found complex cities and governments, specialized agriculture that included irrigation, arts and crafts, highlighting the triad of polychrome ceramics (whose tradition has been inherited by Guanacastecan artisans to this day), the making of jewelry from jade and the manufacture of stone metates, with various regional styles. For 1200 years, the Nicoyan cultural tradition in Guanacaste was clearly established as a distinctive entity.

== Name ==
Nicoya was the name of the monarch who ruled this nation at the time of contact with the Europeans. As it happened with most of the cacicazgos in Costa Rican soil, the Spaniards gave the territory the name of their ruler. This king has been called Nicoa, Nicoya, Nicoián or Nicoyán, etc., the word seems to be a Hispanicization of an indigenous name. Other sources indicate that the monarch who reigned in 1529 was named Nambí. The monarch was referred to as a cacique by the Spanish, but the term in Mangue was mánkeme.

Several theories have been given about the meaning of the word Nicoya. One of the meanings is that Nicoya comes from the Nahuatl word Necoclau, from necoc, "on both sides," and lau, "sea," denoting the peninsular condition of the region ("country with water on both sides"). Another theory says that Nicoya was actually the name by which the Nicoyan kings were called, and that it comes from the Nahuatl Necoc Yáotl, “with enemies on both sides,” since the Chorotegas had constant warlike conflicts with their northern neighbors, the Nicarao people, the Western Huetar Kingdom located to the east, and with the aborigines of the Chira Island, who disputed control of the peninsula and the gulf. Necoc Yáotl is also an invocation of the Mesoamerican god Tezcatlipoca, who in the Mesoamerican cosmogony was, among other characteristics, the god of the battles, and whom the chorotegas and all the Nahua peoples worshiped. One of the ways to represent Tezcatlipoca was the jaguar or jaguar-man (Tepeyollotl), a frequent theme in Nicoyan art.

Nicoya had an elective monarchy where the ruler was appointed by a council of elders named monexico. A system of feudal lords known as galpones ruled a federation of city-states or chiefdoms.
