= Celedón (surname) =

Celedón is a surname of Spanish origin, a variant of Zeledón.

== People with the name ==
- Claudia Celedón (born 1966), Chilean actress
- Jorge Celedón (born 1968), Colombian musician
- Luis Celedón (born 1926), Chilean long-distance runner
- Rafael Celedón (born 1979), Chilean footballer

== See also ==
- Celedón, a symbol of the villager native of Álava, Spain
- Celadon (disambiguation)
