= Celadon (disambiguation) =

Celadon may refer to:

- Celadon, in Chinese pottery, a family of glazes, and also wares in jade-like green colours
- Celadon (color), a pale, sea-green pigment
- Celadon Trucking, a trucking company based in Indianapolis, Indiana, USA
- Céladon, a character in L'Astrée by Honoré d'Urfé
- Celadon (mythology), three figures from Greek mythology
- Celadon (river), a mythological river in Ancient Greece
- Celadon City, a fictional city in the Pokémon series of video games.
- Celadon Books, an American imprint of Macmillan Publishers

== See also ==
- Celedón (surname)
