= Guaitil =

Guaitil Guaytil
- village
- Location in Costa Rica
- Coordinates: 10°16′03″N 85°30′40″W
- Country: Costa Rica
- Province: Guanacaste
- Canton: Santa Cruz
- District: Diriá

Guaitil is a village in Diriá District, Santa Cruz Canton, Guanacaste Province, Costa Rica. It lies along the old route between Santa Cruz and Nicoya. The town is famous for its pottery in the pre-Columbian Chorotega style. Potters using local clays and the same tools and techniques of their indigenous ancestors produce ceramics for local use and the tourist trade in reds, creams and blacks.
