= Chiapanec people =

Indigenous people of Chiapas, Mexico

The Chiapanec or Soctón are an indigenous people of the Central Depression of the Mexican state of Chiapas, especially in Chiapa de Corzo. Today their numbers are very few, owing to assimilation over the centuries. Their language, also referred to as Chiapanec, belonged to the Manguean branch of the Oto-Manguean language family and is now extinct.

According to Terrence Kaufman, archaeological evidence suggests that Manguean speakers entered Chiapas as early as 200 AD. The Chiapanec people probably arrived in the Central Depression of Chiapas between the ninth and tenth centuries AD, taking over the previously Zoque city of Chiapa for which they are named. Oral tradition recorded by Spanish conquerors indicated that they had come from the Pacific coast of Nicaragua, splitting off from their Mangue relatives when the Nicarao people invaded the region. However, in reality it was likely the Mangue who came from Chiapas rather than the other way around. Chiapa became one of the most significant urban centers in what is now Chiapas, and was the capital of a state that came to control most of the Central Depression during the Mesoamerican Postclassic period. They were ruled by an oligarchy of priests, from which two political-military leaders were selected every year. The Chiapanec people generally had bad relations with neighboring Zoque, Tzotzil, Tzeltal and Cabil communities, possibly owing to conflict over the trade route to Tehuantepec. Besides Chiapa, other Chiapanec settlements included Acala, Suchiapa, Chiapilla, Villaflores and Villa Corzo, and likely Venustiano Carranza and Totolapa.

== Religion ==
Among the deities recognized by the prehispanic Chiapanecs were:

- Nombubi: Primordial father, the highest-ranking deity, representing goodness among humans. Controls time and is responsible for giving and taking life.
- Nombobi: God of work and harmony, who animates humans. Equated to the Christian concept of God the Son.
- Mandanda: Goddess of rivers, streams and water as an element of fertility. Offerings were made to her in the Grijalva river in mid-February to ask for rain.
- Nanyhela: Goddess of fertility and harvests, responsible for the ripening of fruits and grasses. She dwelled in the morningstar in the constellation of Orion, visible in the northern hemisphere in December, January and February. Also called Narianyhela (prodigious star), which later became Marianguela and finally the legendary Maria de Angulo.
- Mahapiho: Solar deity, the essence of Nombubi manifested in the sun. Considered an aspect of Matoui.
- Mahatiho: God of wind, storms and hurricanes and another aspect of Matoui. A destructive spirit that controls the patterns of hurricanes.
- Nauiti: Daughter of Nombubi and twin sister of Matoui. Goddess of flowers, virgin girls and the moon. Spirit who renews the home.
- Matoui: Son of Nombubi. God of rain and storms. Solar deity.
- Mohotoui: Representative of Matoui in the domains of rain and lightning.
- Chia: Goddess of the waning moon, considered the evil twin of Nauiti. Responsible for driving people and animals mad, and preventing living things from reaching their full development after their conception. Represented as a green macaw.
- Tishambula: God of evil within the self; the spirit of violence and aggression within humans
- Tishanombubi: Equated to the Christian devil. Twin brother of Nombubi. Lord of the night, violent death, and patron god of war.
- Tishambí: God of evil, insanity and anger
- Tishanila: A deity that appears to travelers on paths and mountains to harm them, changing sex according to the traveler. Typically represented as a beautiful woman with long hair.

There was also the concept of Nombo, the breath of the heart and a universal spirit that animates all living things. Nambaui was a symbolic representation of the celestial cross that projected onto the Earth, depicted as a plant with four branches stretching out to the four directions of the universe.

Among the mythological places recognized by the Chiapanecs were:

- Timindacaa/Ñamaate nacopo: Corresponds to hell. The destination of those who died with the gods displeased with them. A dark place in the interior of the earth.
- Yalailo: Corresponds to heaven. The destination of those who died with the favor of the gods. Located on earth and full of joy, light, food and drink.
- Ndilimbui: a sacred mountain situated on a high mountain range somewhere to the south, which the gods would visit from time to time.
