= Correque =

Indigenous monarch of Costa Rica

Correque was an indigenous monarch of Costa Rica, prince of the Eastern Huetares, who lived in the 16th century. He had several residences and resisted the Conquistadors for some time until he moved one of his courts from Ujarrás to Tucurrique to escape them. He was preceded by El Guarco and succeeded by Fernando Correque.

== Political domain ==
Correque was a son or close relative of El Guarco, his predecessor. A document of 1584, signed by the Spanish Governor Diego de Artieda Chirino y Uclés, mentions him as "... Don Fernando, Rrey [sic] and natural Lord of all this land, son of Guarco, Lord who was also della and his legitimate successor and heir..." Their dominions extended from the Virilla river to Pococí or Chirripó, in Tierradentro, and under their authority was a considerable number of towns. He had four residences, where he lived periodically: one in Atirro, next to Corroce; another in Corroce, another in Turrialba and another in a cacaotal called Acoyte, on the way to the Suerre region or Reventazón basin. He also resided in Ujarrás.

According to Costa Rican historian Ricardo Fernández Guardia in his work El descubrimiento y la conquista, Prince Quitao, who in April 1563 met in Garcimuñoz with Mayor Juan Vázquez de Coronado and submitted to Spanish authority along with eight other monarchs indigenous, was an envoy of Correque.

== Life ==
Correque led several movements against the Spaniards but later left his residence in Ujarrás to escape them, moving with him many other lords and children of lords. He then established his court in Tucurrique, a place that was then known as Taquetaque or Uriuri in the Huetar language, meaning gentlemen and children of lords.

The acting mayor Alonso Anguciana de Gamboa (1574-1577) made a series of tickets and you would run in the neighborhoods of Tucurrique, whose result was that "... this fear was given peace the saying Cacique and the other Yndios, and received the holy dotrina and gave the domain to Su Magestad ... "The Huetar monarch was baptized with the name of Fernando Correque and received the charge of Tucurrique. At his death, Governor Diego de Artieda Chirino y Uclés granted Tucurrique's assignment to his nephew or son Alonso Correque.

Fernando Correque died around 1584, possibly in Tucurrique. He was succeeded by his nephew or son Alonso Correque.
