= José Castulo Zeledón =

Costa Rican ornithologist

José Castulo Zeledón (March 24, 1846 – July 16, 1923) was a Costa Rican ornithologist.

He was the son of Don Manuel Zeledón, governor of the district of San José. José became interested in birds at an early age, and learned about ornithology from the German naturalist and physician Alexander von Frantzius, when he was employed at his pharmacy in San José. Zeledón started collecting birds locally, the specimens being sent to Jean Cabanis at the Berlin Museum.

In 1868 Frantzius returned to Germany. En route, he took Zeledón to Washington, where Zeledón met Spencer Fullerton Baird and became an assistant at the Smithsonian Institution. It was here that he began a lifelong friendship with Robert Ridgway. In 1872 Zeledón returned to Costa Rica as zoologist on an expedition led by William More Gabb. During this expedition Zeledón made the first collection of birds in Talamanca.

Zeledón took over the pharmacy set up by Frantzius, and this eventually made him a wealthy man. He continued to collect birds when time allowed, donating his collection to the Costa Rican National Museum when it was founded, mainly due to his own efforts. This collection was Zeledón's main contribution to ornithology, as it contained many new species, although these were often described by others. He was also able to assist other ornithologists who visited Costa Rica during his lifetime.

Zeledón is commemorated in the scientific names of a number of birds, including the wrenthrush, Zeledonia coronata and the white-fronted tyrannulet, Phyllomyias zeledoni. Also, a species of snake, Geophis zeledoni, is named in his honor.

He was married to Amparo de Zeledón.

== Source ==
- Ridgway, Robert (1923). "In Memoriam: José Castulo Zeledón". Auk. 40 (4): 682–689. doi:10.2307/4074451. JSTOR 4074451.
