= William More Gabb =

American paleontologist

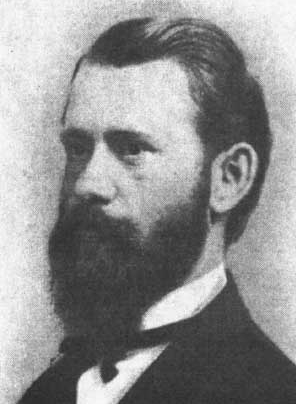
- Born: January 20, 1839; Philadelphia, Pennsylvania, U.S.
- Died: May 30, 1878 (aged 39); Philadelphia, Pennsylvania, U.S.
- Resting place: Woodland Cemetery
- Known for: Surveying the paleontology and geology of California, Baja California, Santo Domingo, and Costa Rica
- Scientific career
- Fields: Paleontology, geology
- Institutions: California Geological Survey; Santo Domingo Land and Mining Company; Government of Costa Rica
- Academic advisors: James Hall

William More Gabb (January 20, 1839 – May 30, 1878) was an American paleontologist.

Gabb was born and educated in Philadelphia, Pennsylvania, the leading center of American science at the time. He graduated from Jefferson Grammar School at age thirteen and was admitted to the prestigious Central High School of Philadelphia. He distinguished himself in his studies and showed an interest in natural history, conchology and geology. He graduated in 1857 with a bachelor of arts degree.

Gabb chose to pursue a career in geology and sought the assistance of the notable geologist, James Hall in Albany, New York. For a time he became Hall's student and assistant before returning to Philadelphia in 1860. There he became an active member of the Academy of Natural Sciences and then briefly joined a group of young scientists studying at the Smithsonian Institution in Washington D.C .

In 1861, Josiah Whitney, chief of the California Geological Survey, was searching for a qualified paleontologist to assist with the survey. After much inquiry, Gabb was recommended as the best authority in American Cretaceous paleontology and, in 1862, he was appointed paleontologist to the survey. William H. Brewer, who led the field work for Whitney, described Gabb as “young, grassy green, but decidedly smart and well-posted in his department--he will develop well with the hard knocks of camp.”

For the next several years, Gabb did extensive work throughout California, and beyond. In-addition to field work, he classified the survey's Cretaceous and Tertiary fossils and documented his findings in the survey reports, writing on paleontology in the first and second volumes of the Geological Survey of California (1864).

In 1863, he was sent to investigate the Cretaceous rocks of Oregon, Washington Territory and Vancouver Island, Canada. In 1864, he explored northern California and southeastern Oregon. The following year, 1865, was spent mainly cataloging and describing the fossils collected during the survey. In 1866, he explored the Coast Ranges and, in 1867, explored the White Mountains along the border between California and Nevada.

Also, in 1867, an expedition was organized to explore Baja California under the leadership of John Ross Browne. Gabb participated in the survey, making important contributions to understanding the geology and geography of the peninsula.

Gabb then returned to the east coast in 1868, and gave a summary of his research during a speech at the National Academy of Sciences. After seeing-to the publication of the second volume of California Paleontology, Gabb ended his participation in the California survey.

In 1868 the government of the Dominican Republic arranged, through the Santo Domingo Land and Mining Company (a New York corporation), for a geological survey of their country. Gabb was hired by the corporation to perform this survey, and remained on the island from 1869 till 1872. He published his findings in an extended memoir, On the Topography and Geology of Santo Domingo (1873).

He was elected as a member of the American Philosophical Society in 1869.

In 1873, the government of Costa Rica engaged Gabb to analyze and survey the geography, geology and resources of the little-known Talamanca Region. One of the principal supporters of this expedition was Minor C. Keith, who started the banana industry in Costa Rica, and eventually co-founded the United Fruit Company.

During his three-year survey, Gabb also made extensive ethnological and natural history collections for the Smithsonian. He was assisted by Jose Zeledon, who went-on to become a well-known Costa Rican ornithologist. While in Costa Rica, Gabb married a local indigenous woman, Victoria. They had one son, Guillermo, born in 1874 or 1875.

Gabb contracted a virulent form of malaria while in Costa Rica. He returned to Philadelphia in 1876, and then traveled again to Santo Domingo with the intention of developing a promising mining claim. However, his declining health forced him back to Philadelphia, where he died on May 30, 1878. He was buried at Woodland Cemetery.
