= Amparo de Zeledón =

Costa Rican botanist and philanthropist (1870–1951)

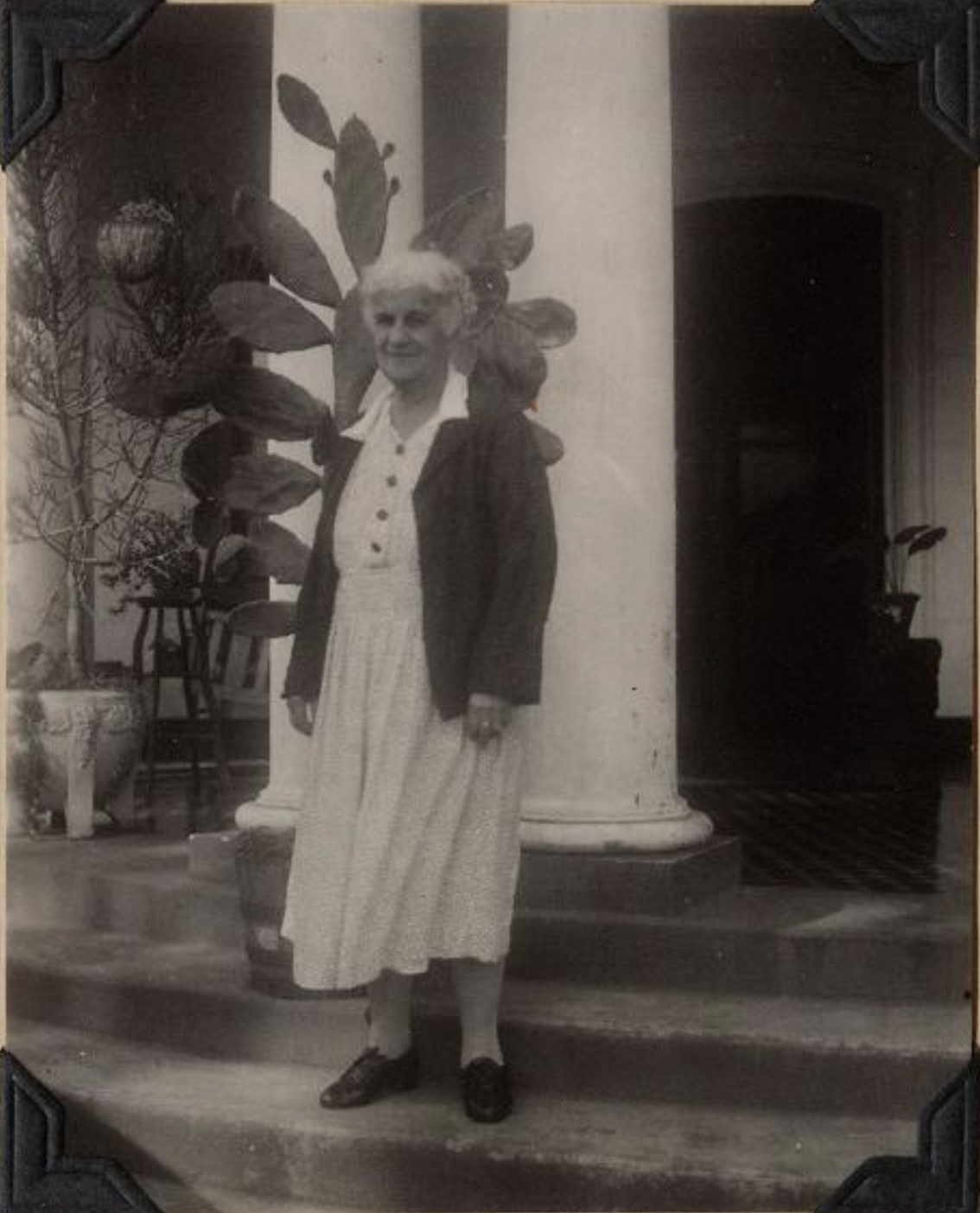
- Zeledón in 1940
- Born: Amparo López Calleja; 7 August 1870; Nuevitas, Captaincy General of Cuba, Spanish Empire
- Died: 20 April 1951 (aged 80); Tegucigalpa, Honduras
- Occupations: Botanist; social activist; philanthropist
- Spouse: José Castulo Zeledón (m. 1895; died 1934)

Amparo de Zeledón (née López Calleja: 7 August 1870 – 20 April 1951) was a Cuban botanist, social activist and philanthropist. Zeledón was the first female botanist in Costa Rica and spent the end of her life in Honduras.

== Family ==
Amparo López Calleja was born on 7 August 1870 in Nuevitas, Captaincy General of Cuba (present-day Cuba) to María Isabel Pereira Falcón and Francisco López-Calleja Pereira. Both of Zeledón's parents were Asturians who had migrated to Cuba.

During the Ten Years' War (Spanish: Guerra de los Diez Años, 1868–1878) against Spanish colonial rule in Cuba, both Zeledón's father and brother Manuel fought for Cuban independence. Zeledón and her family emigrated due to the dangers associated with independence activism, moving to Jamaica, then to Panama and finally Costa Rica. They settled in the Costa Rican city of Puntarenas.

== Career ==
=== Botany ===
Zeledón worked with her husband, José Castulo Zeledón, at the French Apothecary (La Botica Francesa). She became the first botanist in Costa Rica and was internationally known for her botanical collections, particularly of orchids. She sent Costa Rican orchids to the German taxonomist and botanist Rudolf Schlechter for his research.

=== Philanthropy and activism ===
Zeledón was a member of the board of directors of the National Children's Board. In 1913, she was a founder member and the director of the Drop of milk (Spanish: Gota de Leche) [es] charity, which aimed to reduce the rates of infant and child mortality by providing milk and medical care for poor children.

In 1923, Zeledón donated 300₡ towards public education. She was also involved with a Juvenile Reformatory for girls, which promoted education and guidance for offending minors, to promote their reintegration into society, after Zeledón encouraged the institution to move away from a prison concept.

== Personal life ==
On 8 May 1895, Zeledón married the Costa Rican ornithologist José Castulo Zeledón. They had no children together, but adopted three of her nieces and a boy with cerebral palsy, in order to support them. They were married for 28 years, before his death in 1923 in Turin, Italy. Zeledón's husband was a founder of the Museo Nacional de Costa Rica in San José.

Zeledón died on 20 April 1951 in Tegucigalpa, Honduras, aged 80. She was buried in Tegucigalpa, before her remains were repatriated to Costa Rica for reburial in Cartago.
