= Suchiapa =

- Municipality

- Location in Mexico
- Coordinates: 16°37′5″N 93°5′39″W
- Country: Mexico
- State: Chiapas

Area
  - Total: 137.1 sq mi (355.2 km^{2})

Population (2010)
  - Total: 21,045

Suchiapa is a city and municipality in the Mexican state of Chiapas in southern Mexico.

As of 2010, the municipality had a total population of 21,045, up from 15,890 as of 2005. It covers an area of 355.2 km^{2}.

As of 2010, the city of Suchiapa had a population of 16,637. Other than the city of Suchiapa, the municipality had 143 localities, the largest of which (with 2010 populations in parentheses) was: Pacú (2,440), classified as rural.

In Suchiapa there is a dance called Calalá which takes place during the Feast of Corpus Christi. The dance has prehispanic Chiapanec roots and involves participants donning jaguar costumes.
