= El Guarco =

Costa Rican prince

El Guarco was a Costa Rican Indigenous prince, at the time of the Spanish conquest. Its name is preserved in the eastern sector of the Central Valley of Costa Rica, where the city of Cartago is located, in the El Guarco canton in the Cartago Province. Apparently his domains extended from the banks of the Virilla River to the Chirripó region in Tierra Adentro. It is possible that El Guarco was not a personal name, but the designation of its royal office, and that it meant "The Sentinel of Co". Some sources mention El Guarco as monarch of the so-called eastern huetares.

He was succeeded as prince by his son or close relative Correque, who was baptized with the name of Fernando Correque and was entrusted to Tucurrique. In 1584, in a document signed by Governor Diego de Artieda Chirino y Uclés, mention is made of "... Don Fernando, Rrey and natural Lord of all this land, son of Guarco, Lord who was also della and his legitimate successor and heir ... ".

In the inventory of the towns that in 1569 the Governor Pero Afán de Ribera y Gómez illegally commissioned, there is also a prince named Guarco, as monarch of a community called Purapura, which according to he had fifty people, although some historians assume that it was fifty families.

Purapura, along with another community called Pucuca, was entrusted to an individual named Juan Alonso. Given the meager number of people that apparently had the community of Purapura, and the fact that it was given as an entrustment to an individual and not to the Crown, as should be done with the most important communities, called by the Spanish chieftains of cacicazgo, it seems that it was not the father of Correque, but a homonym.
