= Tucurrique =

District in Jiménez canton, Cartago province, Costa Rica

- District
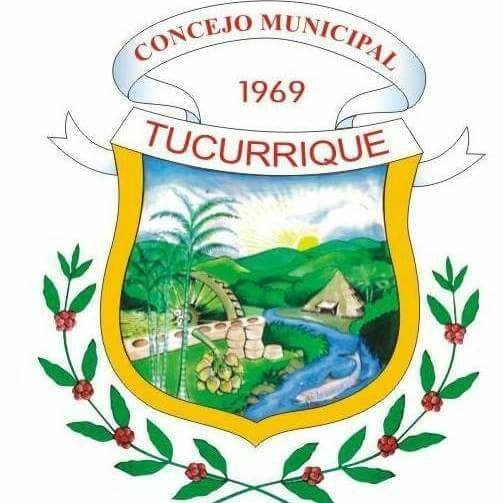
- Flag Seal
- Tucurrique district
- Tucurrique district location in Costa Rica
- Coordinates: 9.8465402°N 83.7313353°W
- Country: Costa Rica
- Province: Cartago
- Canton: Jiménez
- Creation: 19 April 1911

Area
  - Total: 33.52 km^{2} (12.94 sq mi)
- Elevation: 777 m (2,549 ft)

Population (2011)
  - Total: 4,872
  - Density: 145.3/km^{2} (376.4/sq mi)
- Time zone: UTC−06:00
- Postal code: 30402

Tucurrique is a district of the Jiménez canton, in the Cartago province of Costa Rica.

== History ==
Tucurrique was created on 19 April 1911 by Decreto Ejecutivo 12. Segregated from Paraíso canton.

== Geography ==
Tucurrique has an area of 33.52 km^{2} and an elevation of 777 metres.

== Demographics ==
Historical population
Census	Pop.	±% p.a.
1864	342	—
1883	453	+1.49%
1892	639	+3.90%
1927	2,361	+3.80%
1950	3,539	+1.78%
1963	4,626	+2.08%
1973	2,469	−6.09%
1984	3,143	+2.22%
2000	4,284	+1.95%
2011	4,872	+1.18%
2022	5,595	+1.27%
Source: Instituto Nacional de Estadística y Censos; Centro Centroamericano de Población

For the 2011 census, Tucurrique had a population of 4,872 inhabitants.

== Transportation ==
=== Road transportation ===
The district is covered by the following road routes:

- National Route 225

It can be reached from Cartago or Turrialba by bus.
