= Mangue people =

Central American indigenous group

Mangue Mankeme
Total population
- 10,000-221,000

Regions with significant populations
- Nicaragua Costa Rica

Languages
- Mangue (historically), Spanish (modern day)

Religion
- Roman Catholicism with indigenous elements

Related ethnic groups
- Chiapanec people

The Mangue, also known as the Chorotega, are an ethnic group Indigenous to Central America. At the time of Spanish contact in the sixteenth century, they inhabited the Pacific lowlands of Nicaragua and Honduras, northwestern Costa Rica, and in smaller numbers easternmost El Salvador. The Mangue language has been extinct since the 20th century and belonged to the Oto-Manguean family, partially named for the Mangue as the southernmost member.

Estimates of the modern Mangue population in Nicaragua vary widely, from around 10,000 in 1981, to 46,000 according to the 2005 census, 166,000 according to an International Labour Organization estimate in 2006, 210,000 according to Chorotega activists, and 221,000 according to the International Work Group for Indigenous Affairs. In Guaitil, Costa Rica, the Mangue have been absorbed into the Costa Rican culture, losing their language, but pottery techniques and styles have been preserved. Matambú is the only Chorotega indigenous territory in Costa Rica.

== Terminology and subgroups ==
Some sources list "Choluteca" as an alternative name of the people and their language, and this has caused some (for example Terrence Kaufman) to speculate that they were the original inhabitants of the city of Cholula, who were displaced with the arrival of Nahua people in central Mexico. The etymology for the nomenclature "Chorotega" in this case would come from Nahuatl where "Cholōltēcah" means "inhabitants of Cholula", or "people who have fled". The Chorotega-inhabited region of southernmost Honduras known as Choluteca, along with Choluteca City, derive their names from this Nahuatl word. Daniel Garrison Brinton argued that the name Chorotega was a Nahuatl exonym meaning "people who fled" given after a defeat by Nahua forces that split the Chorotega-Mangue people into two groups. He argued that the better nomenclature was Mangue, derived from the group’s endonym mankeme meaning "lords".

Subgroups of the Mangue included the Orotiña (in the Esparza and Puntarenas cantons of Costa Rica), Nicoya (on the Nicoya Peninsula), Orosí (in the Liberia and La Cruz cantons of Costa Rica), Choluteca (in the Choluteca Department of Honduras), and Mangue proper of Nicaragua, who were themselves subdivided into the Dirians (in the departments of Managua, Carazo, Masaya and Granada) and Nagrandans (in the León Department).

In modern times, the term Monimbó has also been used as a name for the ethnic group, referring to a neighborhood of Masaya which still maintains an indigenous identity.

== History ==
Given that the other languages of the Oto-Manguean family are spoken in Mexico, it is thought that the Mangue people moved south from central Mexico together with the Chiapanec people well before the arrival of the Spaniards in the Americas, estimated between 800 and 1350 AD.

Fray Juan de Torquemada's Monarquía Indiana relates an oral account of the migration of the Mangue, referred to as the Nicoyas and described as descendants of Chololtecas. According to this account, "seven or eight lifetimes of old men" before the text was composed, a great population of Mangue resided in interior Soconusco, neighboring the Nicarao (referred to as Nicaraguas) who lived on the coast. Working backwards from the sixteenth century, various scholars have estimated this time period as approximately 800 AD. Both peoples were subsequently conquered by an army of "Olmecas", which William Fowler identifies with the Olmeca-Xicallanca. The Olmecas levied excessive demands of tribute upon both the Nicarao and the Mangue, and eventually they left in secret in one day as to avoid the wrath of their overlords, though Torquemada also mentions that the Mangue migrated before the Nicarao. Terrence Kaufman estimated the linguistic split between Mangue and Chiapanec to have taken place between 600 and 700 AD, and archaeological evidence suggests that the Mangue arrived in the Rivas Department of Nicaragua around 800 AD when Papagayo polychrome ceramics appear. The Mangue were displaced from Rivas to the Nicoya Peninsula when the Nicaraos arrived around 1200 AD. Torquemada also relates an account of this event, detailing that the Nicarao arrival caused some chaos. The Nicarao agreed to leave on condition that the Mangue provide them with porters, which they did. The Nicarao promptly left and camped nearby on the same night. They then proceeded to kill the porters in their sleep, then killed the rest of the Mangue in the region, and those who escaped fled to Nicoya.

After being conquered by the Spanish Empire in the 16th century, many Mangue were enslaved and transported to Panama and Callao, Peru.

== Culture ==
A prehispanic Mangue ceramic vase

The Mangue participated in the manufacture of Nicoya polychrome ceramics. Mangue settlements included temples, sacrificial altars, leaders' houses, council houses, and markets around a central plaza. Councils consisted of elders and leaders of the main settlements, and were responsible for appointing captains general to govern provinces in a type of electoral monarchy. The Mangue cultivated maize, loquats, cotton and tobacco, but not cacao. Warfare was commonplace, using cotton armor, the bow and arrow, and wooden swords with flint knives. Although cacao cultivation was monopolized by the Nicarao, the Mangue nevertheless used it as currency and as a drink. The Nicoyas traded with the inhabitants of the nearby highlands who were probably Chibchan-speakers, providing them with kitchenware, cotton clothing, beads, and corn and other agricultural products.

In terms of religion, they practiced elements of human sacrifice, cannibalism and bloodletting and worshipped sun, rain and fertility deities. Among the few Mangue deities named in historical sources are Tipotani, Nenbithía and Nanguitamalí. The latter two were the primordial man and woman respectively who were the origin of all humans.

Mangue society was divided into social classes including the nobility, commoners, slaves and prisoners of war. Precontact Mangue society is considered to have been less stratified and more democratic than the Nicarao. However, the Spanish conquerors apparently purposely centralized power by dissolving the councils and replacing them with caciques in order to streamline administration.

== See also ==
- Diriangén — a Mangue ruler encountered by Spanish conquistadors in the sixteenth century
- Kingdom of Nicoya — a prehispanic Mangue polity in northwestern Costa Rica
- Ometepe (archaeological site)
- Zapatera (archaeological site)
