= Tárcoles River =

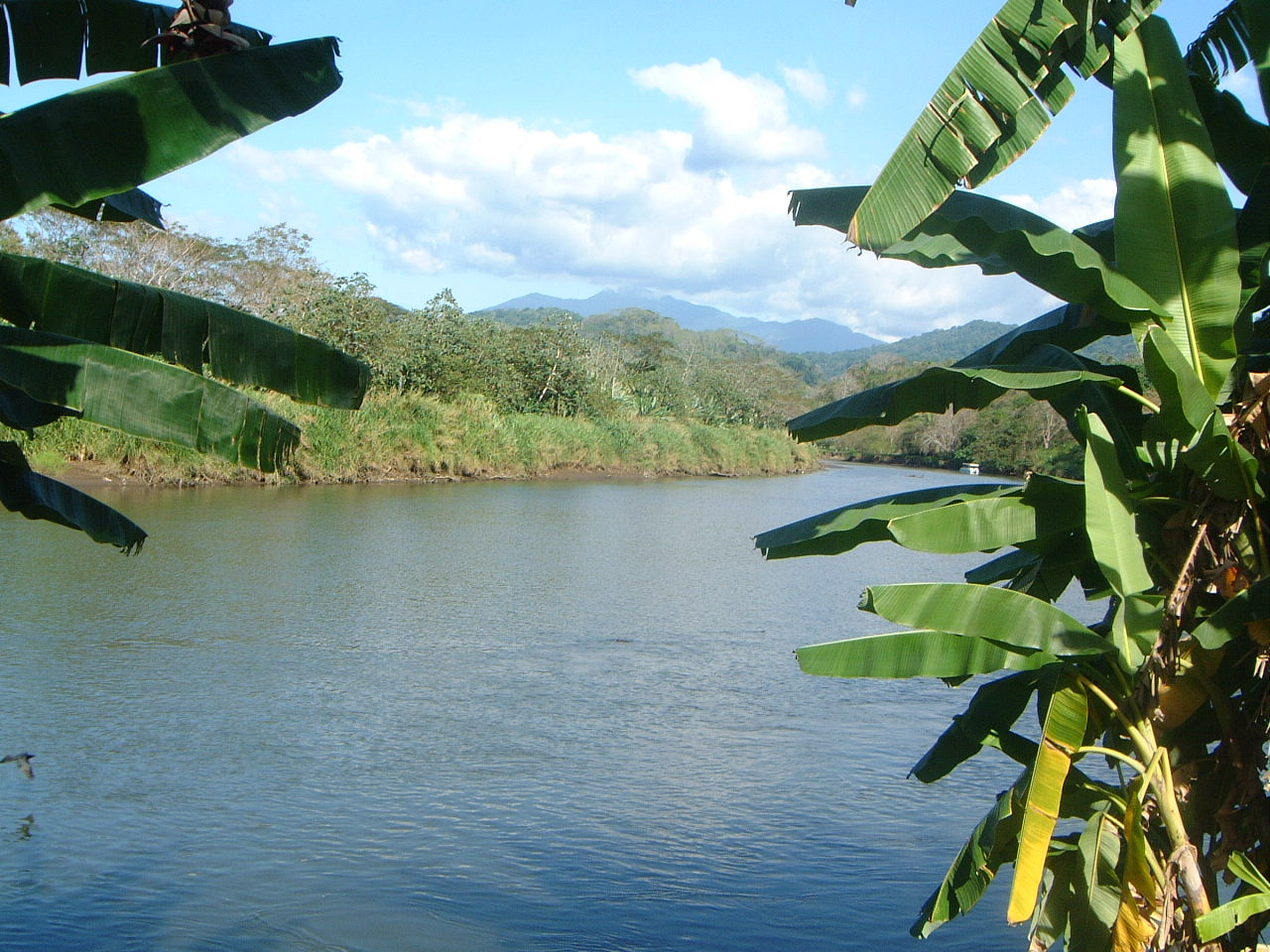
- View from near Carara

Location
- Country: Costa Rica

Physical characteristics
- Source
  - location: Cordillera Central
- Mouth
  - location: Gulf of Nicoya
  - coordinates: 9°47′11″N 84°38′28″W
  - elevation: 0 m (0 ft)
- Length: 111 km (69 mi)
- Basin size: 2,121 km^{2} (819 sq mi)

The Tárcoles River, also called the Grande de Tárcoles River or the Río Grande de Tarcoles, in Costa Rica originates on the southern slopes of the Cordillera Central volcanic range and flows in a south-westerly direction to the Gulf of Nicoya. The river is 111 kilometres (69 mi) long and its watershed covers an area of 2,121 square kilometres (819 sq mi), which accounts for about 4.2% of Costa Rica's land area while concentrating some 55% of its population and 80% of its industry.

== Course ==
The river's watershed drains approximately 67% of Costa Rica's untreated organic and industrial waste and is considered the most contaminated river basin in the country.

The river's upper reaches form the northern border of the Carara National Park. It is a habitat for American crocodiles, while the marshes located at the river's mouth have many waterfowl and wading birds. Among the many herons and egrets are the boatbill and bare-throated tiger heron, and other birds found here include double-striped thick-knee, mangrove warbler and American pygmy kingfisher. The total list known of birds well exceeds 320 species including the little known Guacalillo Canals. The avian biodiversity is substantial including rare birds such as Agami Heron, Rufous-necked Woodrail, Jabiru, Yellow-billed Cotinga and recently found an Orinoco Goose. It's also home of Howler and White-faced Capuchin Monkeys. Less commonly seen are Silky Anteater, Sloths, Grinson, Jaguarundi, River Otter and Northern Tamandua.

Reptiles, such as the American crocodile, caiman, common basilisk and large iguanas, are also easily seen.

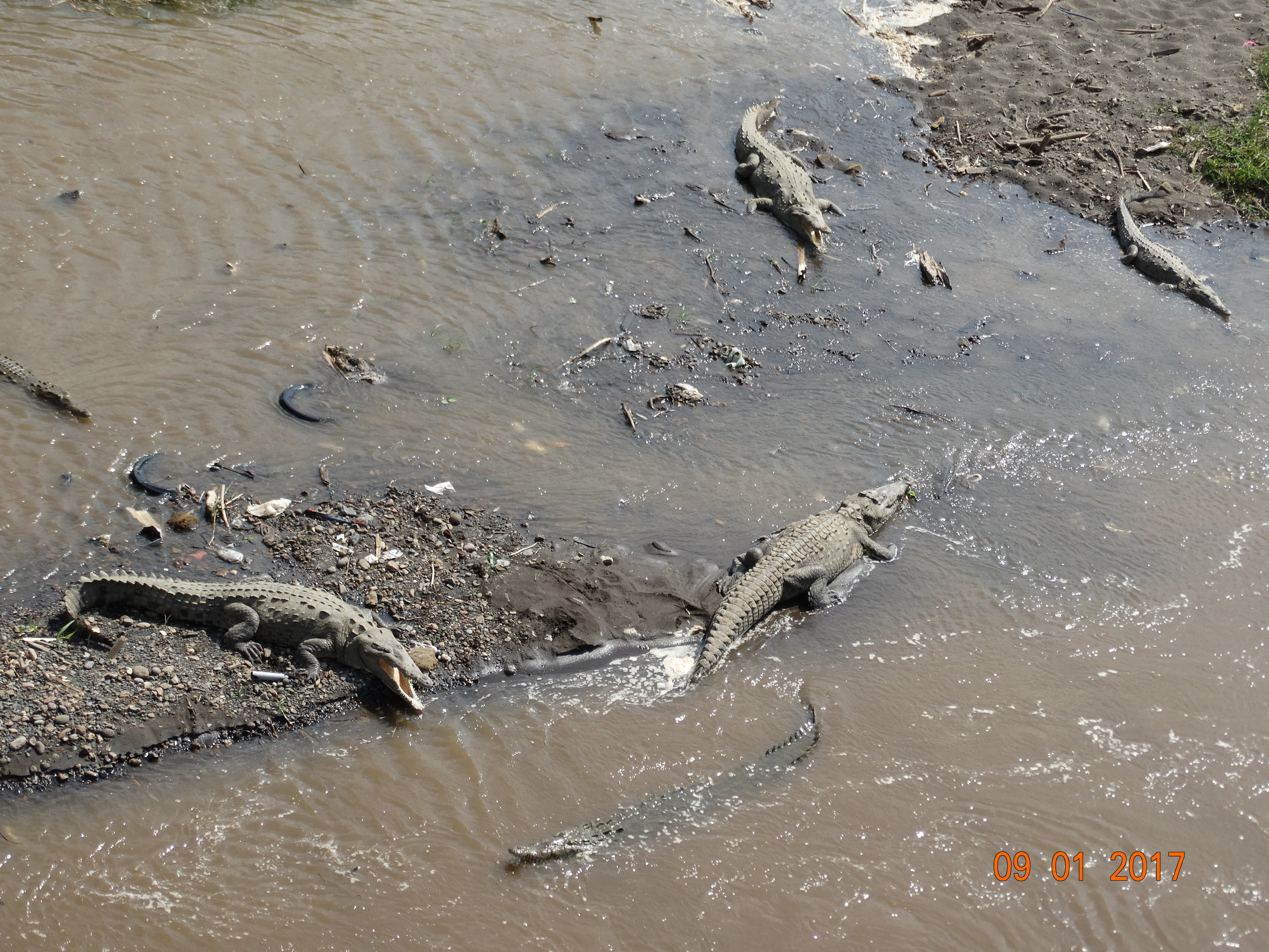
Reptiles in the river

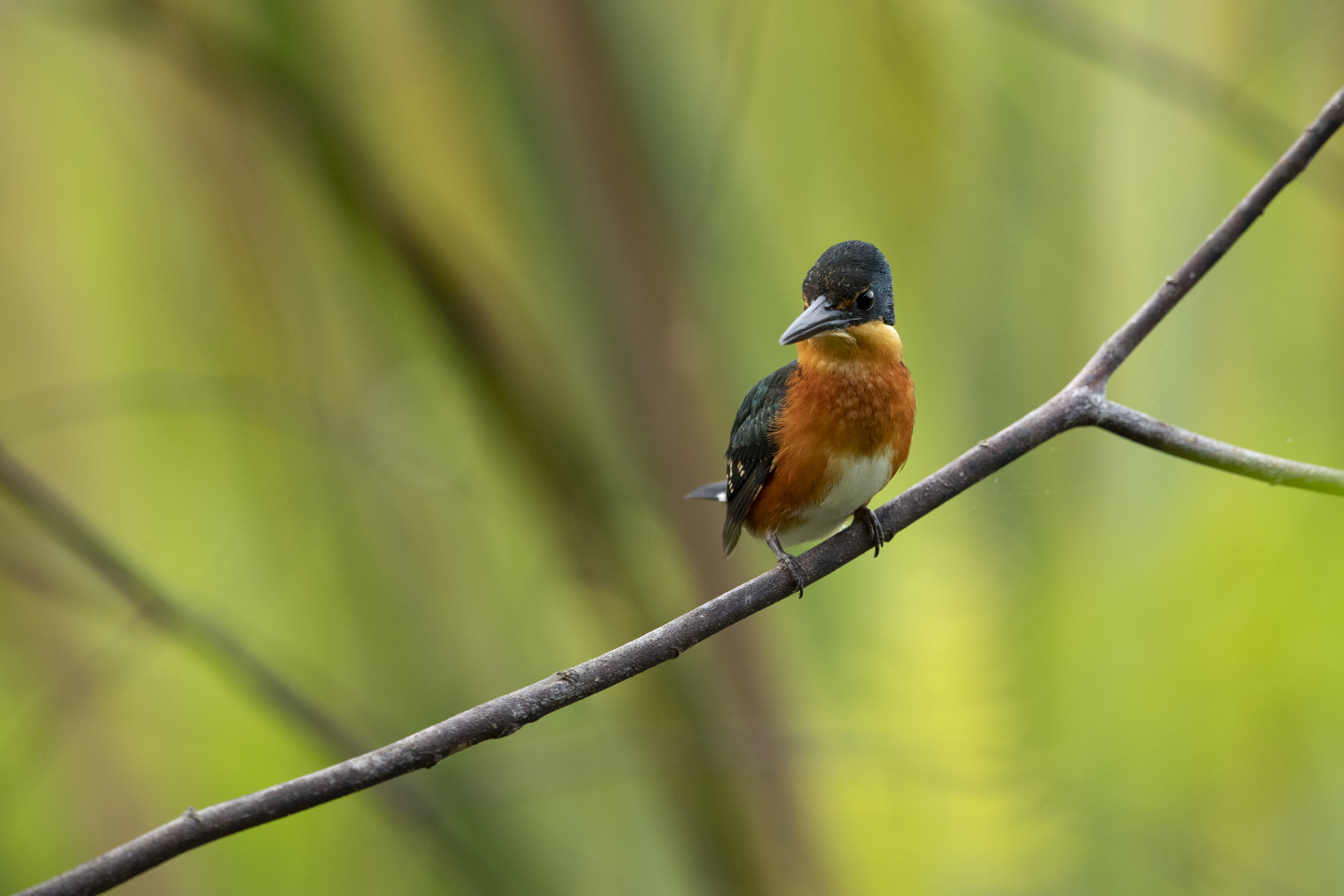
An American Pygmy Kingfisher

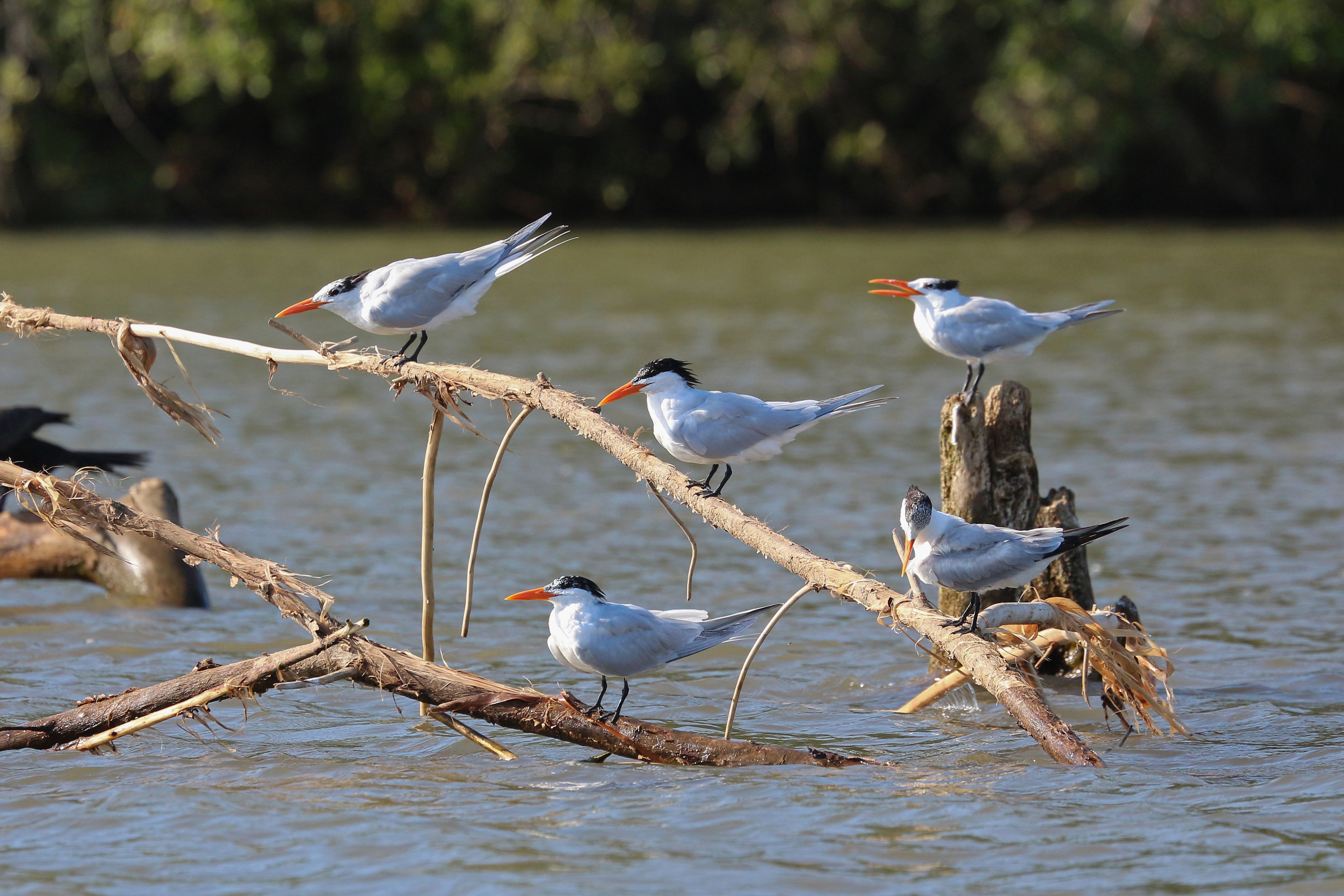
Royal terns

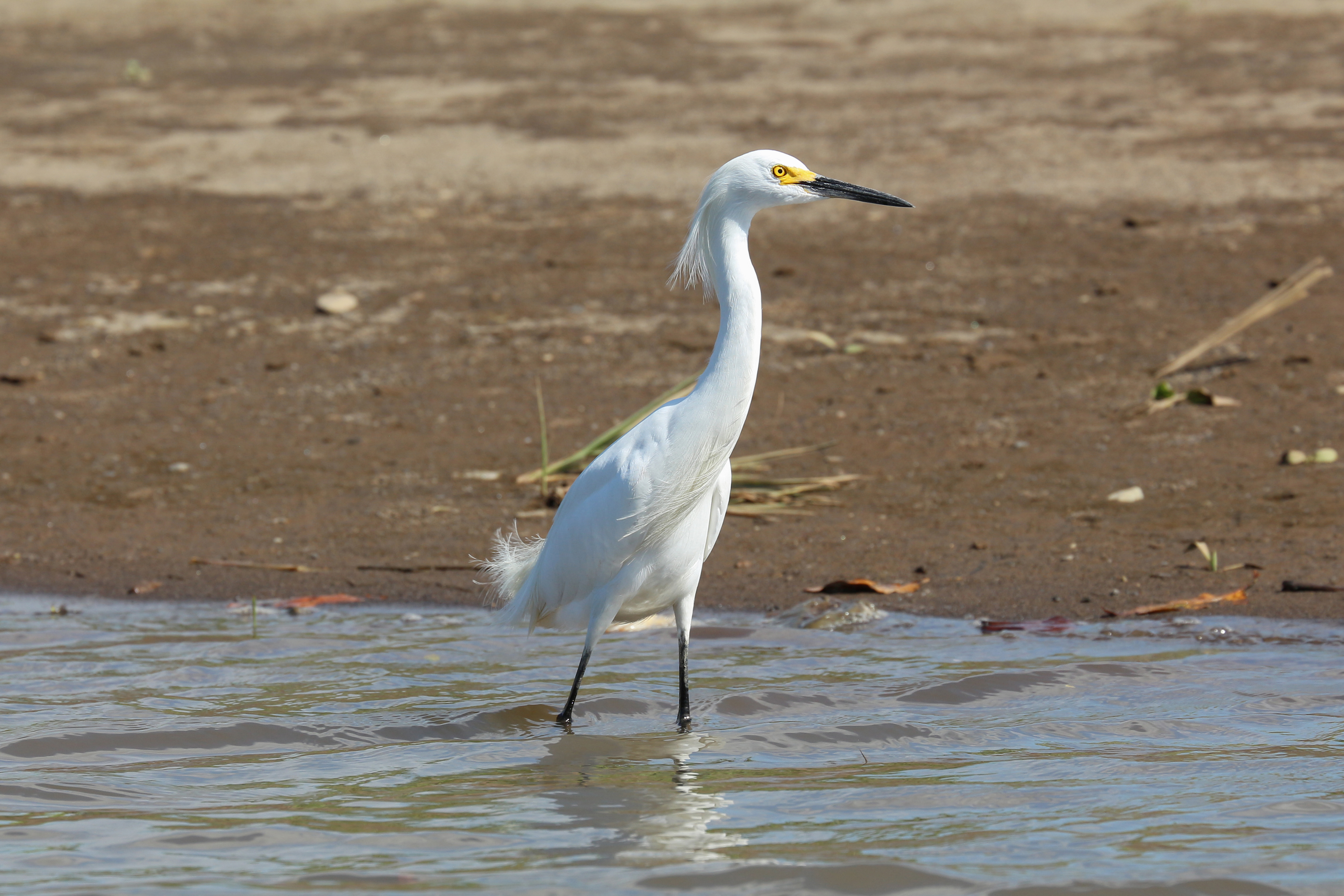
Snowy egret
