= Intermediate Area =

Archeological geographical area of the Americas

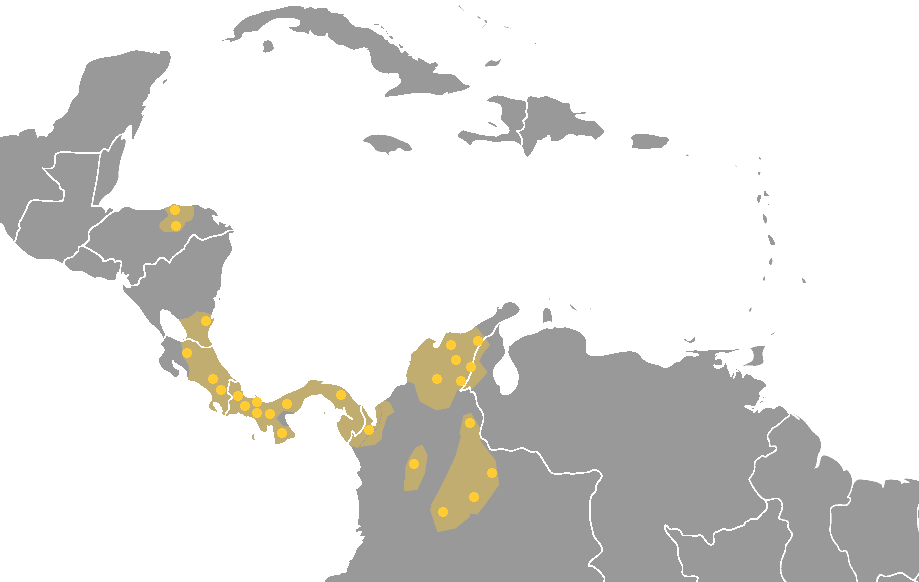
Map of the Intermediate Area, displaying the Chibchan languages

The Intermediate Area is an archaeological geographical area of the Americas that was defined in its clearest form by Gordon R. Willey in his 1971 book An Introduction to American Archaeology, Vol. 2: South America (Prentice Hall: Englewood Cliffs, NJ). It comprises the geographical region between Mesoamerica to the north and the Central Andes to the south, including portions of Honduras and Nicaragua and most of the territory of the republics of Costa Rica, Panama and Colombia. As an archaeological concept, the Intermediate Area has always been somewhat poorly defined.

Because it was not home to ancient state societies but was predominated by early chiefdoms at the time of the Spanish conquest, it was sometimes regarded as a kind of cultural backwater that contributed little to the emergence of Pre-Columbian civilization in the New World. However, recent archaeological research has demonstrated that this part of the Americas had some of the earliest agriculture, pottery, and metallurgy in the hemisphere.

Given new findings, it is likely to have played a critical role in the transmission of culture both to and between neighboring regions to the north and south. Recently, concepts such as that of the Isthmo-Colombian Area have been offered as an alternative to the Intermediate Area with the intention of creating a neutral term.
