= Costa Rican Central Valley =

Plateau and a geographic region of central Costa Rica

Central Valley
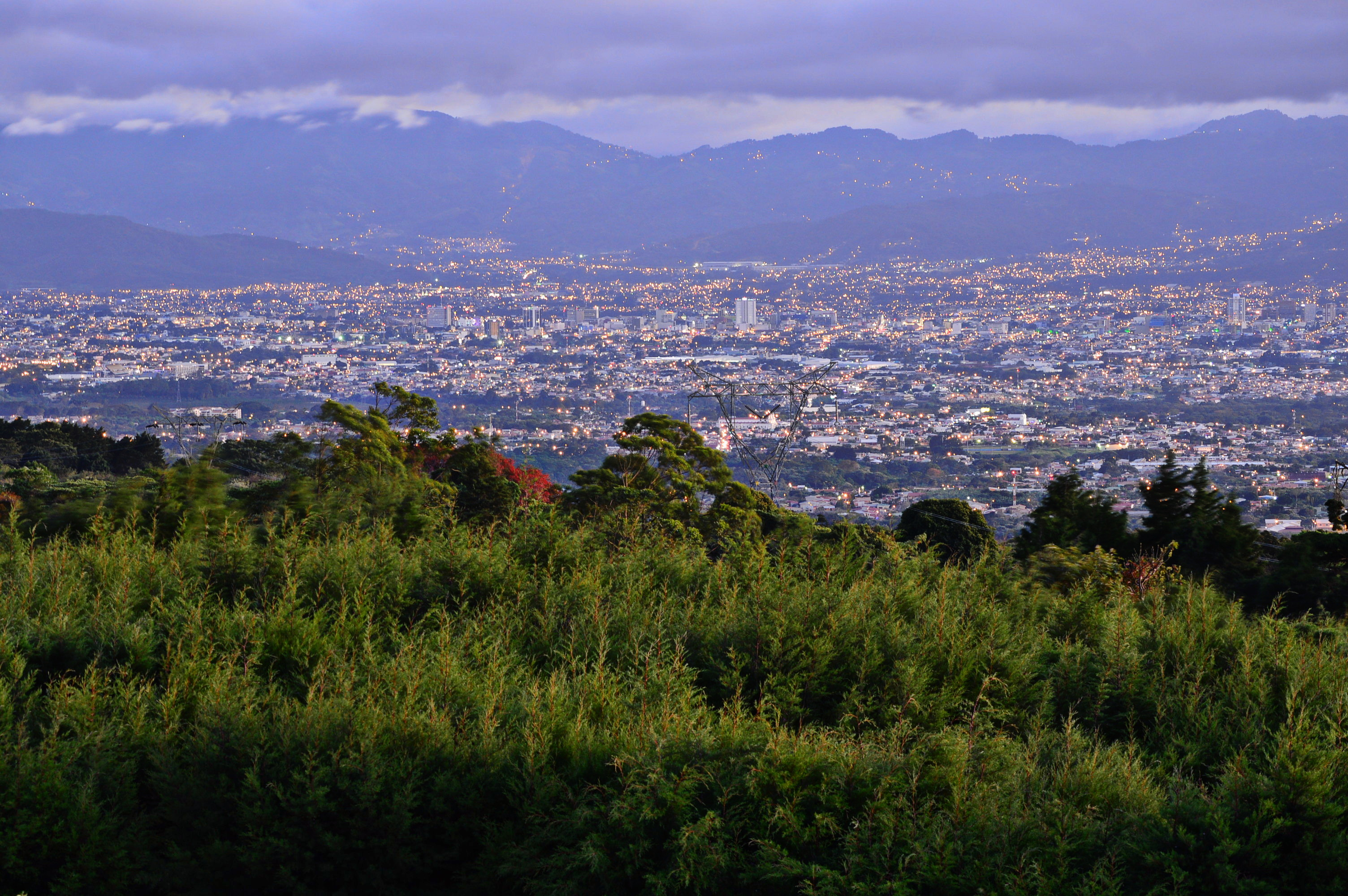
- View of the Central Valley from the north Heredia mountains

- Location within Costa Rica

Naming
- Native name: Valle Central (Spanish)

Geography
- Country: Costa Rica
- Population center: Greater Metropolitan Area
- Coordinates: 9°55′N 84°04′W
- Interactive map of Central Valley

The Central Valley (Spanish: Valle Central) is a plateau and a geographic region of central Costa Rica. The land in the valley is a relative plain, despite being surrounded by several mountains and volcanoes, the latter part of the Central Range. The region houses almost three quarters of Costa Ricans, and includes the capital and most populous city, San José. The valley is shared among the provinces of Alajuela, Heredia, San José, and Cartago. The region occupies an area of 11,366 km^{2}, more than a fifth of the country, and is drained by the Tárcoles River on the west side and by the Reventazón River on the east side.

== Geographic dimensions ==
The Central Valley is commonly considered to extend from the city of San Ramón in Alajuela in the west to the city of Paraíso in Cartago in the east. The mountains north of the valley are part of the Central Range. There are four main volcanoes north of the valley, namely Poás, Barva, Irazú and Turrialba. The mountains that round the plateau to the south form part of the Talamanca Range. A smaller range, the Carpintera Hills, which runs from north to south roughly along the border between the provinces of San José and Cartago, divides the valley into two sections. The western section is normally referred to as "Western Valley" or "Central Valley" proper and the eastern section is referred to as the Eastern Valley or "Valle del Guarco". This smaller range also impacts the weather and ecosystems of the two subregions, with the Western Valley significantly influenced by the weather patterns of Costa Rica's Pacific coast and the Eastern Valley influenced by the Caribbean coast weather.

== Climate ==
Because of its altitude, the temperature in the Central Valley varies between 18 and 30 °C or 64 and 86 °F, mainly because of the position toward the mountains (the altitude also varies between 800 m and 1,500 m above sea level). The western part of the valley is influenced by trade winds in summer, and, as the rest of the country with the exception of the Caribbean region, there are two climate seasons clearly defined, wet and dry. The eastern part of the valley is influenced more by Caribbean conditions, which are more volatile. Annual rainfall in the region varies from 1,900 millimetres or 75 inches in an urban and central place like Pavas to 3,200 millimetres or 126 inches in a rural and mountainous place like Fraijanes. Humidity varies from 75% (10% of volatility) in Pavas, to 87% (rarely descending to less than 80%) in Fraijanes.

== Economic importance ==
The Central Valley had been traditionally the favorite place for Costa Ricans to live, and even today it contains an unequal distribution of population of the country, in relation to its size. This is because of the fertility of land in the region, helped by the influence of volcanoes and rivers that run through the valley. Weather also favours agriculture and farming activities. Because of the agglomeration of population, the valley is the center of commerce, industry and service activities, sustained by ports on both coasts, and by Liberia in Guanacaste (which has the other international airport besides Juan Santamaría Airport in Alajuela) that have similar economic movement.

The Greater Metropolitan Area (GAM) is the main populated conurbation of the country, and covers an extension roughly the same as the Central Valley.
