= Colorado, Pococí =

District in Pococí canton, Limón province, Costa Rica

Colorado
- District
- Interactive map of Colorado
- Colorado district location in Costa Rica
- Coordinates: 10.613232°N 83.5932461°W
- Country: Costa Rica
- Province: Limón
- Canton: Pococí
- Creation: 2 July 1971

Area
  - Total: 1,158.91 km^{2} (447.46 sq mi)
- Elevation: 5 m (16 ft)

Population (2011)
  - Total: 3,985
  - Density: 3.439/km^{2} (8.906/sq mi)
- Time zone: UTC−06:00
- Postal code: 70206

Colorado is a district of the Pococí canton, in the Limón province of Costa Rica. It is at the northeastern border of Costa Rica where it meets Nicaragua and the Caribbean Sea.

Its main population center is Barra del Colorado, located at an altitude of 5 msnm, on the banks of the Colorado River, an important distributary of the San Juan border river.

== History ==
Colorado was created on 2 July 1971 by Decreto Ejecutivo 1825-G. Segregated from Guápiles.

== Geography ==
Colorado has an area of 1,158.91 km^{2} (447.46 sq mi) which corresponds to about 48% of the cantonal area and an elevation of 5 metres.

Within the limits of the district is the Calero Island (151.6 km^{2}, the largest in the country). Another important and near fluvial island is the Brava Island (44.4 km^{2}).

The territory of the district is a continuation of the alluvial plains of the north of the country. With small elevations isolated like the hills Coronel, Cocorí and Tortuguero (of 119 masl).

Colorado basically consists of protected wildlife areas, in particular it is located there, the Barra del Colorado Wildlife Refuge and the Tortuguero National Park.

=== Hydrography ===
An intense and permanent pluvial activity precipitates of 5,500 to 6,000 mm of water per year, flooding the plain, already saturated by the waters of the rivers San Juan, Colorado and Chirripó in its northern limit. To the south, the main rivers are the Suerre, Jiménez and Parismina, which feed the artificial channel of Tortuguero.

The water covers much of the district, in the form of rivers, pipes, canals, lagoons or marshes.

== Demographics ==
Historical population
| Census | Pop. | ±% p.a. |
|---|---|---|
| 1973 | 1,007 | — |
| 1984 | 885 | −1.17% |
| 2000 | 3,482 | +8.94% |
| 2011 | 3,985 | +1.23% |
| 2022 | 5,141 | +2.34% |
Source: Instituto Nacional de Estadística y Censos; Centro Centroamericano de Población

For the 2011 census, Colorado had a population of 3,985 inhabitants, it has one of the lowest demographic densities at the national level.

== Settlements ==
The district is made up of the following population centers:

- Neighborhoods (Barrios): Barra del Colorado Este
- Villages (Poblados): Aragón, Buenavista, Malanga, San Gerardo, Tortuguero

== Transportation ==
The communication with the zone is essentially fluvial or aerial, due to the little development of the terrestrial routes.

=== Road transportation ===
The district is covered by the following road routes:

- National Route 247
- National Route 507

=== Canals ===
A 78 km long river canal connects the southern boundary of Barra del Colorado with the Port of Moin along the Caribbean Sea coast.

=== Airport ===
- Barra del Colorado Airport

== Climate ==
Barra del Colorado has a very wet tropical rainforest climate (Af) with heavy rainfall from February to April and very heavy to extremely heavy rainfall in the remaining months.

Climate data for Barra del Colorado
| Month | Jan | Feb | Mar | Apr | May | Jun | Jul | Aug | Sep | Oct | Nov | Dec | Year |
|---|---|---|---|---|---|---|---|---|---|---|---|---|---|
| Mean daily maximum °C (°F) | 29.8 (85.6) | 30.4 (86.7) | 31.6 (88.9) | 31.9 (89.4) | 31.6 (88.9) | 30.5 (86.9) | 30.5 (86.9) | 30.1 (86.2) | 30.2 (86.4) | 30.1 (86.2) | 29.1 (84.4) | 29.1 (84.4) | 30.4 (86.7) |
| Daily mean °C (°F) | 25.6 (78.1) | 26.1 (79.0) | 27.2 (81.0) | 27.8 (82.0) | 27.5 (81.5) | 26.6 (79.9) | 26.9 (80.4) | 26.4 (79.5) | 26.1 (79.0) | 26.0 (78.8) | 25.4 (77.7) | 25.2 (77.4) | 26.4 (79.5) |
| Mean daily minimum °C (°F) | 21.5 (70.7) | 21.9 (71.4) | 22.9 (73.2) | 23.7 (74.7) | 23.4 (74.1) | 22.7 (72.9) | 23.3 (73.9) | 22.7 (72.9) | 22.0 (71.6) | 21.9 (71.4) | 21.7 (71.1) | 21.4 (70.5) | 22.4 (72.4) |
| Average precipitation mm (inches) | 500 (19.7) | 285 (11.2) | 184 (7.2) | 269 (10.6) | 375 (14.8) | 459 (18.1) | 749 (29.5) | 538 (21.2) | 341 (13.4) | 472 (18.6) | 711 (28.0) | 751 (29.6) | 5,634 (221.9) |
Source: Climate-Data.org
