= Duacarí =

District in Guácimo canton, Limón province, Costa Rica

- District
- Interactive map of Duacarí
- Duacarí district location in Costa Rica
- Coordinates: 10.3166709°N 83.6159785°W
- Country: Costa Rica
- Province: Limón
- Canton: Guácimo
- Creation: 27 November 1980

Area
  - Total: 81.36 km^{2} (31.41 sq mi)
- Elevation: 18 m (59 ft)

Population (2011)
  - Total: 6,059
  - Density: 74.47/km^{2} (192.9/sq mi)
- Time zone: UTC−06:00
- Postal code: 70605

Duacarí is a district of the Guácimo canton, in the Limón province of Costa Rica.

== History ==
Duacarí was created on 27 November 1980 by Decreto Ejecutivo 12091-G. Segregated from Río Jiménez.

== Geography ==
Duacarí has an area of 81.36 km^{2} and an elevation of 18 metres.

== Locations ==
- Villages (Poblados): Aguas Gatas, Carambola, Castaño, Esperanza, Fruta de Pan, Limbo, Zancudo

== Demographics ==
Historical population
Census	Pop.	±% p.a.
1984	2,699	—
2000	5,600	+4.67%
2011	6,059	+0.72%
2022	7,728	+2.24%
Source: Instituto Nacional de Estadística y Censos; Centro Centroamericano de Población

For the 2011 census, Duacarí had a population of 6,059 inhabitants.

== Transportation ==
=== Road transportation ===
The district is covered by the following road routes:

- National Route 248
