= Roxana, Pococí =

District in Pococí canton, Limón province, Costa Rica

Roxana
- District
- Roxana district
- Roxana district location in Costa Rica
- Coordinates: 10.3586188°N 83.6737701°W
- Country: Costa Rica
- Province: Limón
- Canton: Pococí
- Creation: 2 July 1971

Area
  - Total: 175.67 km^{2} (67.83 sq mi)
- Elevation: 106 m (348 ft)

Population (2011)
  - Total: 16,790
  - Density: 95.58/km^{2} (247.5/sq mi)
- Time zone: UTC−06:00
- Postal code: 70204

Roxana is a district of the Pococí canton, in the Limón province of Costa Rica.

== History ==
Roxana was created on 2 July 1971 by Decreto Ejecutivo 1825-G. Segregated from Guápiles.

== Geography ==
Roxana has an area of 175.67 km^{2} and an elevation of 106 metres.

It presents a flat landscape in almost all the extension of its territory, with an average altitude of 106 meters on the level of the sea.

It is located in the northeastern region of the country and borders the districts of Cariari to the north, La Rita to the west, Colorado to the east, Guacimo to the south.

Its head, the town of Roxana, is located 10.7 km (16 minutes) to the north of Guápiles and 77.6 km (1 hours 35 minutes) to the northeast of San José the capital of the nation.

== Demographics ==
Historical population
| Census | Pop. | ±% p.a. |
|---|---|---|
| 1973 | 4,345 | — |
| 1984 | 5,824 | +2.70% |
| 2000 | 15,706 | +6.40% |
| 2011 | 16,790 | +0.61% |
| 2022 | 20,449 | +1.81% |
Source: Instituto Nacional de Estadística y Censos; Centro Centroamericano de Población

For the 2011 census, Roxana had a population of 16,790 inhabitants.

== Settlements ==
The population centers that make up the district are:

- Neighborhoods (Barrios): La Cruz, Punta de Riel
- Villages (Poblados): Anabán, Boca Guápiles (part), Castañal, Cruce, Curia, Curva, Curva del Humo, Esperanza, Humo, Lomas Azules, Maravilla, Mata de Limón, Millón, Milloncito, Oeste, Prado (part), Roxana Tres, San Francisco, San Jorge, Vegas de Tortuguero

== Transportation ==
=== Road transportation ===
The district is covered by the following road routes:

- National Route 247
- National Route 248
- National Route 809
- National Route 810

== Economy ==
Extensive banana and pineapple cultivation for export purposes is a strong activity in the area.

Roxana, its head, has health and education services. Entertainment services are also offered in recreational areas.

In terms of trade, the sale of groceries and various accessories stands out.
