= Parismina River =

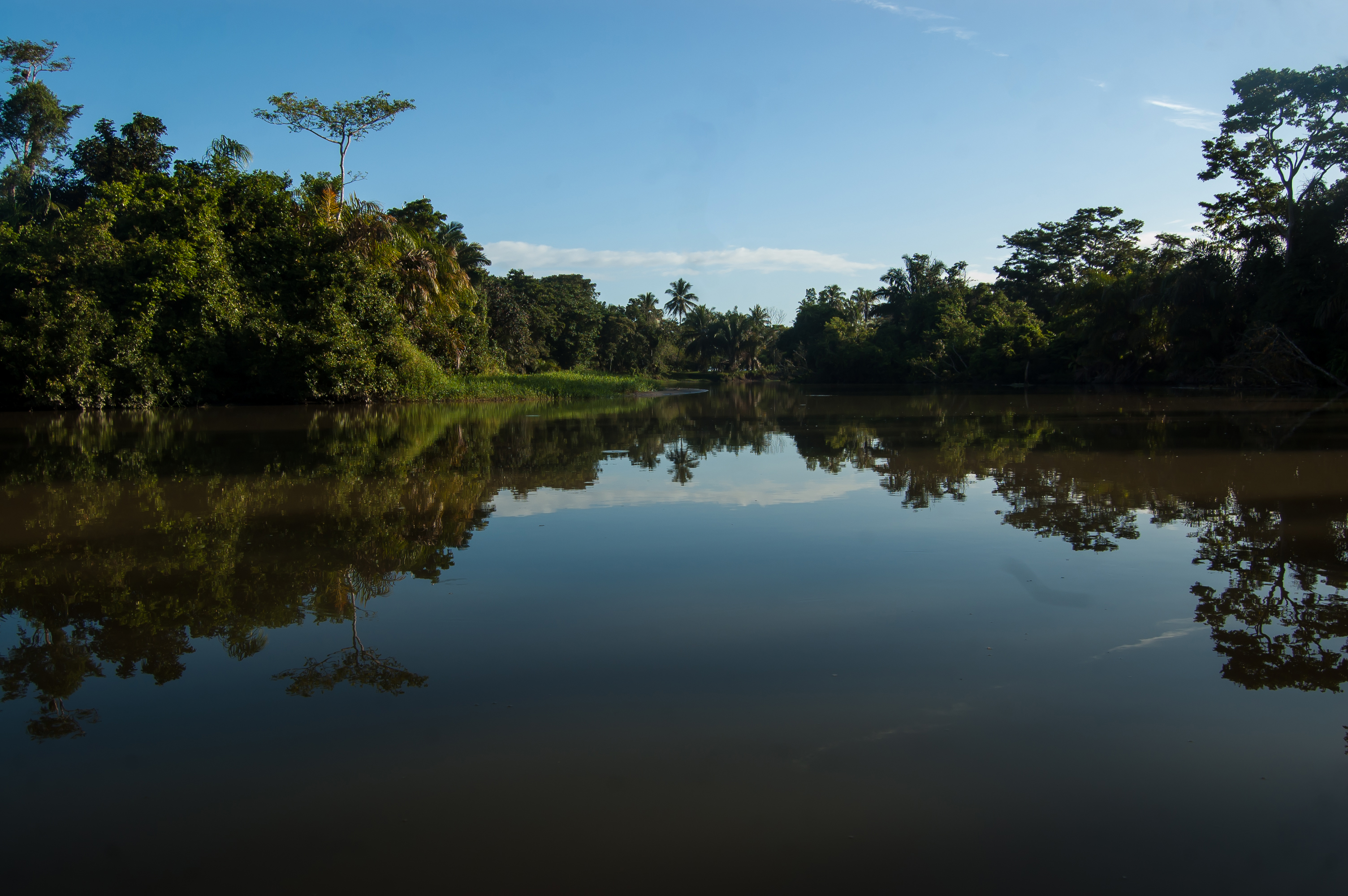
- The Parismina River, downstream from the confluence of the Reventazón, near Parismina

- Location within Costa Rica

Location
- Countries: Costa Rica
- Provinces: Limón

Physical characteristics
- Source: Mercedes District, Guácimo canton
  - coordinates: 10°03′49″N 83°43′01″W
- Mouth: Caribbean Sea
  - coordinates: 10°19′00″N 83°21′28″W

The Parismina River is a river in Costa Rica. It flows into the Caribbean Sea.

Located in the Province of Limón, it is navigable for 21 km from its confluence with the River Reventazón to its mouth in the Boca del Parismina.

It starts in Mercedes District, Guácimo canton, Limon Province. Its source is to the north-east of the Turrialba Volcano (in Cartago Province). It is in the Central Volcanic Mountain Range Forest Reserve (Reserva Forestal Cordillera Volcánica Central).

Its delta is a nesting site for three of the seven marine turtles:

- green
- leatherback
- hawksbill

A study was conducted on how to counter the disruptive effects of the Reventazón Hydroelectric Project.

== Affluents ==
- Jiménez river (north side)
- Reventazón River (south side)
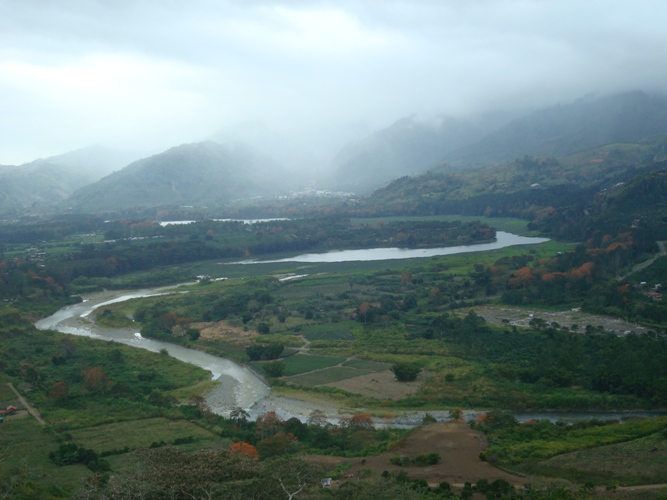
Reventazón River
