= List of hospitals in Costa Rica =

″This is a list of hospitals in Costa Rica which are open and treating patients.

== San José Province ==
=== San José ===
==== NATIONAL HEALTH SERVICE: Caja Costarricense de Seguro Social ====
- Hospital San Juan de Dios, built in 1854 and partially rebuilt in 1995, 2004 and 2009
- Hospital Nacional de Niños, built in 1961
- Hospital Dr Rafael Ángel Calderón Guardia, built in 1946 (rebuilt in 1990 and 2015)
- Centro Nacional de Rehabilitación, built in 1973
- Hospital Dr. Raúl Blanco Cervantes (for gerontological and geriatric healthcare), built in 1950 and rebuilt in 2016
- Hospital Nacional de las Mujeres Dr Ricardo Carit Eva
- Hospital México, built in 1969
- Hospital Nacional Psiquiátrico, built in 1970

==== NATIONAL INSURANCE INSTITUTE: Instituto Nacional de Seguros ====
- Hospital de Trauma, built in 2010

==== PRIVATE OPERATORS in San José ====
- Hospital Clínica Bíblica (San José), built in 1927 and rebuilt in 1990, 2002 and 2008
- Hospital Clínica Católica
- Hospital Clínica Santa Rita
- Hospital Metropolitano (San José)

=== Escazú ===
==== PRIVATE OPERATORS in Escazú ====
- Hospital CIMA (Escazú), built in 2000

=== Santa Ana ===
==== PRIVATE OPERATORS in Santa Ana ====
- Hospital Clínica Bíblica (Santa Ana)
- Hospital Metropolitano (Santa Ana)

=== Tibás ===
==== PRIVATE OPERATORS in Tibás ====
- Hospital Clínica Unibe
- Hospital Metropolitano (Tibás)

=== Guadalupe ===
==== PRIVATE OPERATORS in Guadalupe ====
- Hospital Cristiano Jerusalem

=== Pérez Zeledón ===
==== NATIONAL HEALTH SERVICE: Caja Costarricense de Seguro Social ====
- Hospital Dr Fernando Escalante Pradilla

== Alajuela Province ==
=== Alajuela ===
==== NATIONAL HEALTH SERVICE: Caja Costarricense de Seguro Social ====
- Hospital San Rafael

=== San Ramon ===
==== NATIONAL HEALTH SERVICE: Caja Costarricense de Seguro Social ====
- Hospital Dr Carlos Luis Valverde Vega

=== Ciudad Quesada ===
==== NATIONAL HEALTH SERVICE: Caja Costarricense de Seguro Social ====
- Hospital de San Carlos

==== PRIVATE OPERATOR in Ciudad Quesada ====
- Hospital San Carlos Borromeo

=== Grecia ===
==== NATIONAL HEALTH SERVICE: Caja Costarricense de Seguro Social ====
- Hospital San Francisco de Asís

=== Upala ===
==== NATIONAL HEALTH SERVICE: Caja Costarricense de Seguro Social ====
- Hospital de Upala

=== Los Chiles ===
==== NATIONAL HEALTH SERVICE: Caja Costarricense de Seguro Social ====
- Hospital de Los Chiles

== Cartago Province ==
=== Cartago ===
==== NATIONAL HEALTH SERVICE: Caja Costarricense de Seguro Social ====
- Hospital Max Peralta in Cartago

==== PRIVATE OPERATOR in Cartago ====
- Hospital Universal

=== Turrialba ===
==== NATIONAL HEALTH SERVICE: Caja Costarricense de Seguro Social ====
- Hospital William Allen in Turrialba

== Heredia Province ==
=== Heredia ===
==== NATIONAL HEALTH SERVICE: Caja Costarricense de Seguro Social ====
- Hospital San Vicente de Paul

== Guanacaste Province ==
=== Liberia ===
==== NATIONAL HEALTH SERVICE: Caja Costarricense de Seguro Social ====
- Hospital Enrique Baltodano Briceño in Liberia

==== PRIVATE OPERATOR in Liberia ====
- Hospital CIMA Guanacaste
- Hospital Clínico San Rafael Arcángel

=== Nicoya ===
==== NATIONAL HEALTH SERVICE: Caja Costarricense de Seguro Social ====
- Hospital de la Anexion

== Puntarenas Province ==
=== Puntarenas ===
==== NATIONAL HEALTH SERVICE: Caja Costarricense de Seguro Social ====
- Hospital Monseñor Sanabria in Puntarenas

=== Golfito ===
==== NATIONAL HEALTH SERVICE: Caja Costarricense de Seguro Social ====
- Hospital Lic Manuel Mora Valverde

=== Ciudad Neilly ===
==== NATIONAL HEALTH SERVICE: Caja Costarricense de Seguro Social ====
- Hospital de Ciudad Neilly

=== San Vito ===
==== NATIONAL HEALTH SERVICE: Caja Costarricense de Seguro Social ====
- Hospital de San Vito

=== Puerto Cortés ===
==== NATIONAL HEALTH SERVICE: Caja Costarricense de Seguro Social ====
- Hospital Dr Tomás Casas Casajús

=== Quepos ===
==== NATIONAL HEALTH SERVICE: Caja Costarricense de Seguro Social ====
- Hospital Dr Max Terán Valls

== Limón Province ==
=== Limon ===
==== NATIONAL HEALTH SERVICE: Caja Costarricense de Seguro Social ====
- Hospital Dr. Tony Facio Castro

=== Guápiles ===
==== NATIONAL HEALTH SERVICE: Caja Costarricense de Seguro Social ====
- Hospital de Guápiles
