= Rita, Pococí =

District in Pococí canton, Limón province, Costa Rica

Rita
- District
- Rita district
- Rita district location in Costa Rica
- Coordinates: 10.4337009°N 83.7530067°W
- Country: Costa Rica
- Province: Limón
- Canton: Pococí
- Creation: 2 July 1971

Area
  - Total: 502.39 km^{2} (193.97 sq mi)
- Elevation: 111 m (364 ft)

Population (2011)
  - Total: 24,041
  - Density: 47.853/km^{2} (123.94/sq mi)
- Time zone: UTC−06:00
- Postal code: 70203

Rita is a district of the Pococí canton, in the Limón province of Costa Rica.

== History ==
Rita was created on 2 July 1971 by Decreto Ejecutivo 1825-G. Segregated from Guápiles.

== Geography ==
Rita has an area of 502.39 km^{2} and an elevation of 111 metres.

It presents a territory dominated by the plains, with an average altitude of 111 meters above sea level.

It is located in the northeastern region of the country and borders the districts of Colorado to the north, Guápiles to the south and Cariari to the east. While to the west it borders with the province of Heredia.

Its head, the village of La Rita, is located 9.6 km (17 minutes) to the north of Guápiles and 74.9 km (1 hours 32 minutes) to the northeast of San José the capital of the nation.

== Demographics ==
Historical population
Census	Pop.	±% p.a.
1973	6,529	—
1984	11,965	+5.66%
2000	21,841	+3.83%
2011	24,041	+0.88%
2022	27,315	+1.17%
Source: Instituto Nacional de Estadística y Censos; Centro Centroamericano de Población

For the 2011 census, Rita had a population of 24,041 inhabitants.

== Settlements ==
The district's population centers are:

- Neighborhoods (Barrios): Cruce de Jordán, Cristo Rey (La Perrera), Peligro, Pueblo Nuevo.
- Villages (Poblados): Balastre, Canta Gallo, Cayuga, Cocorí, Chirvalo, Encina, Gallopinto, Hamburgo, I Griega, Indio, Jardín, Palmitas, Porvenir, Primavera, Rótulo, San Carlos, San Cristóbal, San Pedro, Santa Elena, Sirena, Suárez, Suerte, Tarire, Teresa, Ticabán, Triángulo, Victoria, Prado

== Economy ==
Banana and pineapple cultivation of extensive modality for export purposes play an important role in the area.

La Rita has health and education services. Entertainment services are also offered in recreational areas.

In terms of trade, the sale of groceries, shoes, clothes and various accessories stands out.

== Transportation ==
=== Road transportation ===
The district is covered by the following road routes:

- National Route 247
- National Route 249
- National Route 809
- National Route 814
- National Route 817
