= Hospital Dr. Tony Facio Castro =

Hospital in Limón, Costa Rica

Geography
- Location: Limón, Limón Province, Costa Rica
- Coordinates: 9°59′59″N 83°01′35″W

Organisation
- Type: General

Links
- Lists: Hospitals in Costa Rica

Hospital Dr. Tony Facio Castro, known as Hospital Tony Facio, in Limón, Costa Rica, caters to the health needs of Limón Province.

The hospital occupies 22,000 square metres and is divided into modules including hospitalization and outpatient facilities. It provides specialized services in some areas of the cantons of Pococí, Guácimo, and the Cariari district for a combined population of 166,723 inhabitants in those areas.

It services three population categories: direct population (236,565 people directly attached or assigned to the hospital), indirect population (not directly allocated but are referred by specialists), and floating population (other unattached people and tourists). The direct population comes from Limón (city), Siquirres, Talamanca, and Matina. The indirect population is from Pococí, Guácimo, and the Cariari district; and the floating population comprises national and international immigrants into the area, and tourists.

The hospital commemorates Dr. Tony Facio (29 October 1918 – 20 December 1948), a native of Puerto Limón born as Maximiliano Antonio de la Paz Facio Castro, son of Dr. Antonio Facio Ulloa and Cristina Castro Carazo, who died at the age of 30. The Hospital San Juan de Dios in San José also has a medical research centre named "Doctor Antonio Facio Castro" dedicated in the late 1940s to the "illustrious doctor who died tragically at a young age."

== Location ==
Hospital Tony Facio occupies most of a small peninsula protruding into the Caribbean Sea on the northeast side of Limón, about 0.75 km from the town centre. It is right on the coast and looks out at Uvita Island 1.5 km offshore, and across a small bay to Parque Vargas, a municipal park 0.8 km to the south.

== Epidemics ==
Along with smaller local clinics, the hospital treats regional dengue fever outbreaks during the rainy season; the outbreaks sometimes cause bed shortages.

== Crime ==
The hospital operates in a high crime city, and treats victims of violence and shootings. Gunmen entered the hospital on 10 May 2007 and assassinated a patient on the second floor who was recovering from bullet wounds received three days earlier during a gun battle with police in Limón.

Several doctors and nurses at Tony Facio were subjected to a continuing campaign of extortion for over a year in 2008–9 when organized criminals acquired personal details about staff, including home addresses and names of family members. Threats and extortive demands were made against hospital personnel, including death threats, causing some of them to leave their jobs and depriving the hospital of critical expertise. Police arrested a surgical nurse working at the hospital and said he was the source of personal data used by the extortionists.
