= National Route 810 (Costa Rica) =

National Road Route in Costa Rica

National Tertiary Route 810
- Ruta nacional terciaria 810

Route information
- Maintained by Ministry of Public Works and Transport
- Length: 11.290 km (7.015 mi)

Location
- Country: Costa Rica
- Provinces: Limón

Highway system
- National Road Network of Costa Rica
← Route 809	→ Route 811

National Tertiary Route 810, or just Route 810 (Spanish: Ruta Nacional Terciaria 810, or Ruta 810) is a National Road Route of Costa Rica, located in the Limón province.

== Description ==
In Limón province the route covers Pococí canton (Jiménez and Roxana districts).
