= National Route 249 (Costa Rica) =

National Road Route in Costa Rica

National Secondary Route 249
- Ruta nacional secundaria 249

Route information
- Maintained by Ministry of Public Works and Transport
- Length: 46.645 km (28.984 mi)

Location
- Country: Costa Rica
- Provinces: Limón

Highway system
- National Road Network of Costa Rica
← Route 248	→ Route 250

National Secondary Route 249, or just Route 249 (Spanish: Ruta Nacional Secundaria 249, or Ruta 249) is a National Road Route of Costa Rica, located in the Limón province.

== Description ==
In Limón province the route covers Pococí canton (Guápiles, La Rita, Cariari, and La Colonia districts).
