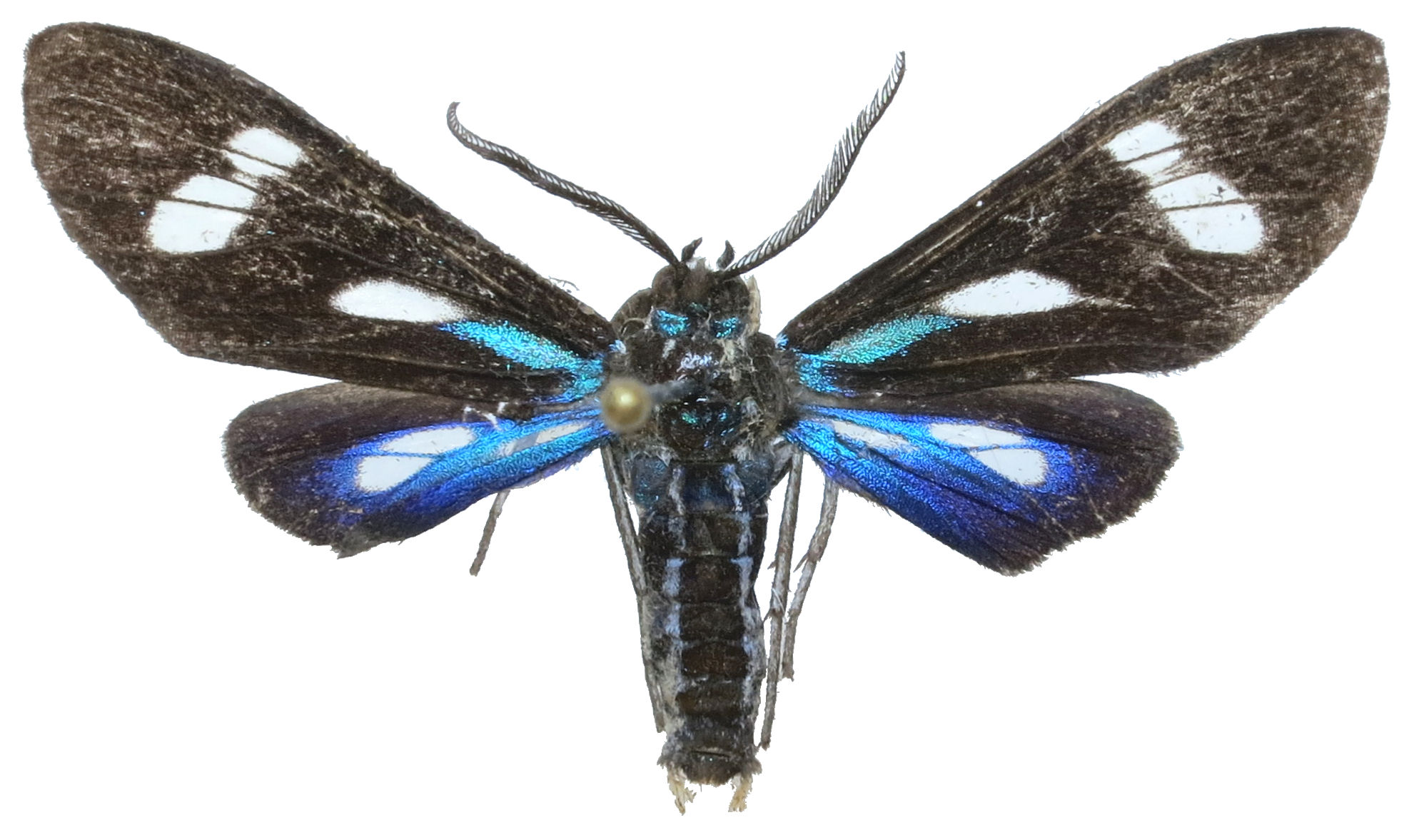
- From Guápiles, Costa Rica

Scientific classification
- Domain: Eukaryota
- Kingdom: Animalia
- Phylum: Arthropoda
- Class: Insecta
- Order: Lepidoptera
- Superfamily: Noctuoidea
- Family: Erebidae
- Subfamily: Arctiinae
- Genus: Leucopleura
- Species: L. cucadma

Binomial name
- Leucopleura cucadma (H. Druce, 1894)

Synonyms
- Cosmosoma cucadma H. Druce, 1894

= Leucopleura cucadma =

Species of moth

Leucopleura cucadma is a moth of the subfamily Arctiinae. It was described by Herbert Druce in 1894. It is found in Panama.
