= National Route 816 (Costa Rica) =

National Road Route in Costa Rica

National Tertiary Route 816
- Ruta nacional terciaria 816

Route information
- Maintained by Ministry of Public Works and Transport
- Length: 7.015 km (4.359 mi)

Location
- Country: Costa Rica
- Provinces: Limón

Highway system
- National Road Network of Costa Rica
← Route 814	→ Route 817

National Tertiary Route 816, or just Route 816 (Spanish: Ruta Nacional Terciaria 816, or Ruta 816) is a National Road Route of Costa Rica, located in the Limón province.

== Description ==
In Limón province the route covers Guácimo canton (Guácimo district).
