= La Colonia =

District in Pococí canton, Limón province, Costa Rica

- District
- Interactive map of La Colonia
- La Colonia district location in Costa Rica
- Coordinates: 10.2713465°N 83.7986457°W
- Country: Costa Rica
- Province: Limón
- Canton: Pococí
- Creation: 11 June 2012; 14 years ago

Area
  - Total: 39.1 km^{2} (15.1 sq mi)
- Elevation: 180 m (590 ft)
- Time zone: UTC−06:00
- Postal code: 70207

La Colonia is a district of the Pococí canton, in the Limón province of Costa Rica.

== History ==
La Colonia was created on 11 June 2012 by Decreto Ejecutivo N° 24-2012-MGP.

== Geography ==
La Colonia has an area of 39.1 km^{2} and an elevation of 180 metres.

It presents a flat landscape in the totality of its territory, with an average altitude of 5 meters on the level of the sea.

It is located in the central Caribbean region and borders the districts of Jiménez to the east and Guápiles to the south, to the west and to the north.

Its head, the village of San Rafael, is located 6 km (12 minutes) to the northwest of Guápiles and 68.7 km (1 hours 33 minutes) to the northeast of San José the capital of the nation.

== Demographics ==
Historical population
Census	Pop.	±% p.a.
2022	10,852	—
Source: Instituto Nacional de Estadística y Censos; Centro Centroamericano de Población

For the 2011 census, La Colonia had not been created, therefore census data will be available until 2021.

== Settlements ==
The population centers that make up the district are:

- Villages (Poblados): San Rafael, Brisas del Toro Amarillo, Cascada, La Victoria, Losilla, San Bosco, Santa Elena, Prado (Parte)

== Transportation ==
=== Road transportation ===
The district is covered by the following road routes:

- National Route 247
- National Route 249
- National Route 809
