= National Route 814 (Costa Rica) =

National Road Route in Costa Rica

National Tertiary Route 814
- Ruta nacional terciaria 814

Route information
- Maintained by Ministry of Public Works and Transport
- Length: 12.105 km (7.522 mi)

Location
- Country: Costa Rica
- Provinces: Limón

Highway system
- National Road Network of Costa Rica
← Route 813	→ Route 816

National Tertiary Route 814, or just Route 814 (Spanish: Ruta Nacional Terciaria 814, or Ruta 814) is a National Road Route of Costa Rica, located in the Limón province.

== Description ==
In Limón province the route covers Pococí canton (La Rita and Cariari districts).
