= 2003 Davis Cup Americas Zone Group IV =

International tennis competition

The Americas Zone was one of the three zones of the regional Davis Cup tennis competition in 2003.

In the Americas Zone there were four different tiers, called groups, in which teams competed against each other to advance to the upper tier. The six teams in Group IV played in a single Round-robin tournament . The top two teams were promoted to the Americas Zone Group III in 2004. All other teams remained in Group IV.

== Draw ==
- Venue: Cariari Country Club, Cariari, Costa Rica (outdoor hard)
- Date: 31 March–5 April

Team	Pld	W	L	MF	MA
Panama	5	4	1	11	4
U.S. Virgin Islands	5	4	1	9	6
Costa Rica	5	3	2	9	6
Barbados	5	2	3	8	7
Bermuda	5	2	3	7	8
Eastern Caribbean	5	0	5	1	14

Panama and the US Virgin Islands promoted to Group III for 2004.

== Results ==
=== Costa Rica vs. U.S. Virgin Islands ===
Costa Rica
1
Cariari Country Club, Cariari, Costa Rica
31 March 2003

U.S. Virgin Islands
2

			1	2	3
1	(Costa Rica) (United States Virgin Islands)	David Alvarado; Kenny Callender	6; 3	4; 6	1; 6
2	(Costa Rica) (United States Virgin Islands)	Juan Carlos González; Terrance Eugene Highfield	6; 4	6^{6} 7^{8}	1; 6
3	(Costa Rica) (United States Virgin Islands)	Diego Alvarado / Marck Van Der Laat-Robles; Nicholas Bass / John Richards	3; 6	7^{9} 6^{7}	6; 4

=== Panama vs. Eastern Caribbean ===
Panama
3
Cariari Country Club, Cariari, Costa Rica
31 March 2003

Eastern Caribbean
0

			1	2	3
1	(Panama) (Eastern Caribbean)	Alberto González; Glynn James	6; 2	6; 4
2	(Panama) (Eastern Caribbean)	Chadd Valdes; Kirt Cable	6; 2	6; 1
3	(Panama) (Eastern Caribbean)	Abad Goon / David López; Deron Grant / Trevor Sam	6; 2	6; 2

=== Bermuda vs. Barbados ===
Bermuda
1
Cariari Country Club, Cariari, Costa Rica
31 March 2003

Barbados
2

			1	2	3
1	(Bermuda) (Barbados)	Jenson Bascome; Duane Williams	1; 6	6; 3	1; 6
2	(Bermuda) (Barbados)	James Collieson; Damien Applewhaite	6; 4	6; 1
3	(Bermuda) (Barbados)	Jenson Bascome / Richard Mallory; Akil Burgess / Michael Date	4; 6	6; 3	3; 6

=== Costa Rica vs. Eastern Caribbean ===
Costa Rica
2
Cariari Country Club, Cariari, Costa Rica
1 April 2003

Eastern Caribbean
1

			1	2	3
1	(Costa Rica) (Eastern Caribbean)	David Alvarado; Glynn James	7^{7} 6^{2}	6; 4
2	(Costa Rica) (Eastern Caribbean)	Juan Carlos González; Kirt Cable	6; 4	6; 3
3	(Costa Rica) (Eastern Caribbean)	Diego Alvarado / Marck Van Der Laat-Robles; Kirt Cable / Glynn James	2; 6	1; 6

=== Panama vs. Bermuda ===
Panama
1
Cariari Country Club, Cariari, Costa Rica
1 April 2003

Bermuda
2

			1	2	3
1	(Panama) (Bermuda)	Alberto González; Jenson Bascome	6; 4	4; 6	2; 6
2	(Panama) (Bermuda)	Chadd Valdes; James Collieson	3; 6	6; 2	6; 1
3	(Panama) (Bermuda)	Abad Goon / Chadd Valdes; Jenson Bascome / James Collieson	6; 4	5; 7	3; 6

=== Barbados vs. U.S. Virgin Islands ===
Barbados
1
Cariari Country Club, Cariari, Costa Rica
1 April 2003

U.S. Virgin Islands
2

			1	2	3
1	(Barbados) (United States Virgin Islands)	Duane Williams; Kenny Callender	5; 7	6; 3	4; 6
2	(Barbados) (United States Virgin Islands)	Damien Applewhaite; Terrance Eugene Highfield	1; 6	1; 6
3	(Barbados) (United States Virgin Islands)	Akil Burgess / Michael Date; Nicholas Bass / John Richards	3; 6	6; 2	6; 4

=== Costa Rica vs. Barbados ===
Costa Rica
2
Cariari Country Club, Cariari, Costa Rica
2 April 2003

Barbados
1

			1	2	3
1	(Costa Rica) (Barbados)	David Alvarado; Akil Burgess	6; 2	3; 6	6; 4
2	(Costa Rica) (Barbados)	Juan Carlos González; Duane Williams	6; 3	6; 1
3	(Costa Rica) (Barbados)	Diego Alvarado / Marck Van Der Laat-Robles; Damien Applewhaite / Michael Date	2; 6	4; 6

=== Panama vs. U.S. Virgin Islands ===
Panama
3
Cariari Country Club, Cariari, Costa Rica
2 April 2003

U.S. Virgin Islands
0

			1	2	3
1	(Panama) (United States Virgin Islands)	Alberto González; Kenny Callender	6; 4	0; 6	7; 5
2	(Panama) (United States Virgin Islands)	Chadd Valdes; Terrance Eugene Highfield	3; 6	6; 4	6; 2
3	(Panama) (United States Virgin Islands)	Abad Goon / David López; Nicholas Bass / John Richards	6; 3	6; 2

=== Bermuda vs. Eastern Caribbean ===
Bermuda
3
Cariari Country Club, Cariari, Costa Rica
2 April 2003

Eastern Caribbean
0

			1	2	3
1	(Bermuda) (Eastern Caribbean)	Jenson Bascome; Glynn James	6; 0	6; 2
2	(Bermuda) (Eastern Caribbean)	James Collieson; Kirt Cable	6; 1	6^{5} 7^{7}	6; 4
3	(Bermuda) (Eastern Caribbean)	Richard Mallory / Jovan Whitter; Kirt Cable / Deron Grant	7; 5	6; 4

=== Costa Rica vs. Bermuda ===
Costa Rica
3
Cariari Country Club, Cariari, Costa Rica
4 April 2003

Bermuda
0

			1	2	3
1	(Costa Rica) (Bermuda)	David Alvarado; Jenson Bascome	6; 2	3; 6	6; 4
2	(Costa Rica) (Bermuda)	Juan Carlos González; James Collieson	6; 3	6; 1
3	(Costa Rica) (Bermuda)	Diego Alvarado / Marck Van Der Laat-Robles; Richard Mallory / Jovan Whitter	2; 6	4; 6

=== Panama vs. Barbados ===
Panama
2
Cariari Country Club, Cariari, Costa Rica
4 April 2003

Barbados
1

			1	2	3
1	(Panama) (Barbados)	Alberto González; Akil Burgess	3; 6	7^{7} 6^{3}	8; 6
2	(Panama) (Barbados)	Chadd Valdes; Duane Williams	4; 6	6; 3	7; 5
3	(Panama) (Barbados)	Abad Goon / David López; Damien Applewhaite / Michael Date	3; 6	6; 3	7; 9

=== Eastern Caribbean vs. U.S. Virgin Islands ===
Eastern Caribbean
0
Cariari Country Club, Cariari, Costa Rica
4 April 2003

U.S. Virgin Islands
3

			1	2	3
1	(Eastern Caribbean) (United States Virgin Islands)	Deron Grant; Kenny Callender	2; 6	0; 6
2	(Eastern Caribbean) (United States Virgin Islands)	Kirt Cable; Terrance Eugene Highfield	6^{3} 7^{7}	1; 6
3	(Eastern Caribbean) (United States Virgin Islands)	Deron Grant / Glynn James; Nicholas Bass / John Richards	3; 6	7^{7} 6^{5}	4; 6

=== Costa Rica vs. Panama ===
Costa Rica
1
Cariari Country Club, Cariari, Costa Rica
5 April 2003

Panama
2

			1	2	3
1	(Costa Rica) (Panama)	David Alvarado; Alberto González	6; 4	7^{7} 6^{2}
2	(Costa Rica) (Panama)	Juan Carlos González; Chadd Valdes	2; 6	6; 3	2; 6
3	(Costa Rica) (Panama)	Diego Alvarado / Juan Carlos González; Abad Goon / David López	6; 2	3; 6	4; 6

=== Bermuda vs. U.S. Virgin Islands ===
Bermuda
1
Cariari Country Club, Cariari, Costa Rica
5 April 2003

U.S. Virgin Islands
2

			1	2	3
1	(Bermuda) (United States Virgin Islands)	Jenson Bascome; Kenny Callender	3; 6	6^{3} 7^{7}
2	(Bermuda) (United States Virgin Islands)	James Collieson; Terrance Eugene Highfield	3; 6	0; 6
3	(Bermuda) (United States Virgin Islands)	Richard Mallory / Jovan Whitter; Nicholas Bass / John Richards	4; 6	6; 4	6; 3

=== Barbados vs. Eastern Caribbeans ===
Barbados
3
Cariari Country Club, Cariari, Costa Rica
5 April 2003

Eastern Caribbean
0

			1	2	3
1	(Barbados) (Eastern Caribbean)	Michael Date; Deron Grant	7^{7} 6^{4}	6; 2
2	(Barbados) (Eastern Caribbean)	Damien Applewhaite; Kirt Cable	6; 3	2; 6	7; 5
3	(Barbados) (Eastern Caribbean)	Akil Burgess / Duane Williams; Deron Grant / Trevor Sam	6; 1	6; 1
