= National Route 809 (Costa Rica) =

National Road Route in Costa Rica

National Tertiary Route 809
- Ruta nacional terciaria 809

Route information
- Maintained by Ministry of Public Works and Transport
- Length: 6.105 km (3.793 mi)

Location
- Country: Costa Rica
- Provinces: Limón

Highway system
- National Road Network of Costa Rica
← Route 807	→ Route 810

National Tertiary Route 809, or just Route 809 (Spanish: Ruta Nacional Terciaria 809, or Ruta 809) is a National Road Route of Costa Rica, located in the Limón province.

== Description ==
In Limón province the route covers Pococí canton (La Rita, Roxana, and La Colonia districts).
