= National Route 247 (Costa Rica) =

National Road Route in Costa Rica

National Secondary Route 247
- Ruta nacional secundaria 247

Route information
- Maintained by Ministry of Public Works and Transport
- Length: 67.935 km (42.213 mi)

Location
- Country: Costa Rica
- Provinces: Limón

Highway system
- National Road Network of Costa Rica
← Route 246	→ Route 248

National Secondary Route 247, or just Route 247 (Spanish: Ruta Nacional Secundaria 247, or Ruta 247) is a National Road Route of Costa Rica, located in the Limón province.

== Description ==
In Limón province the route covers Pococí canton (Guápiles, La Rita, Roxana, Cariari, Colorado, and La Colonia districts).
