= Volio Waterfall =

Waterfall in Costa Rica

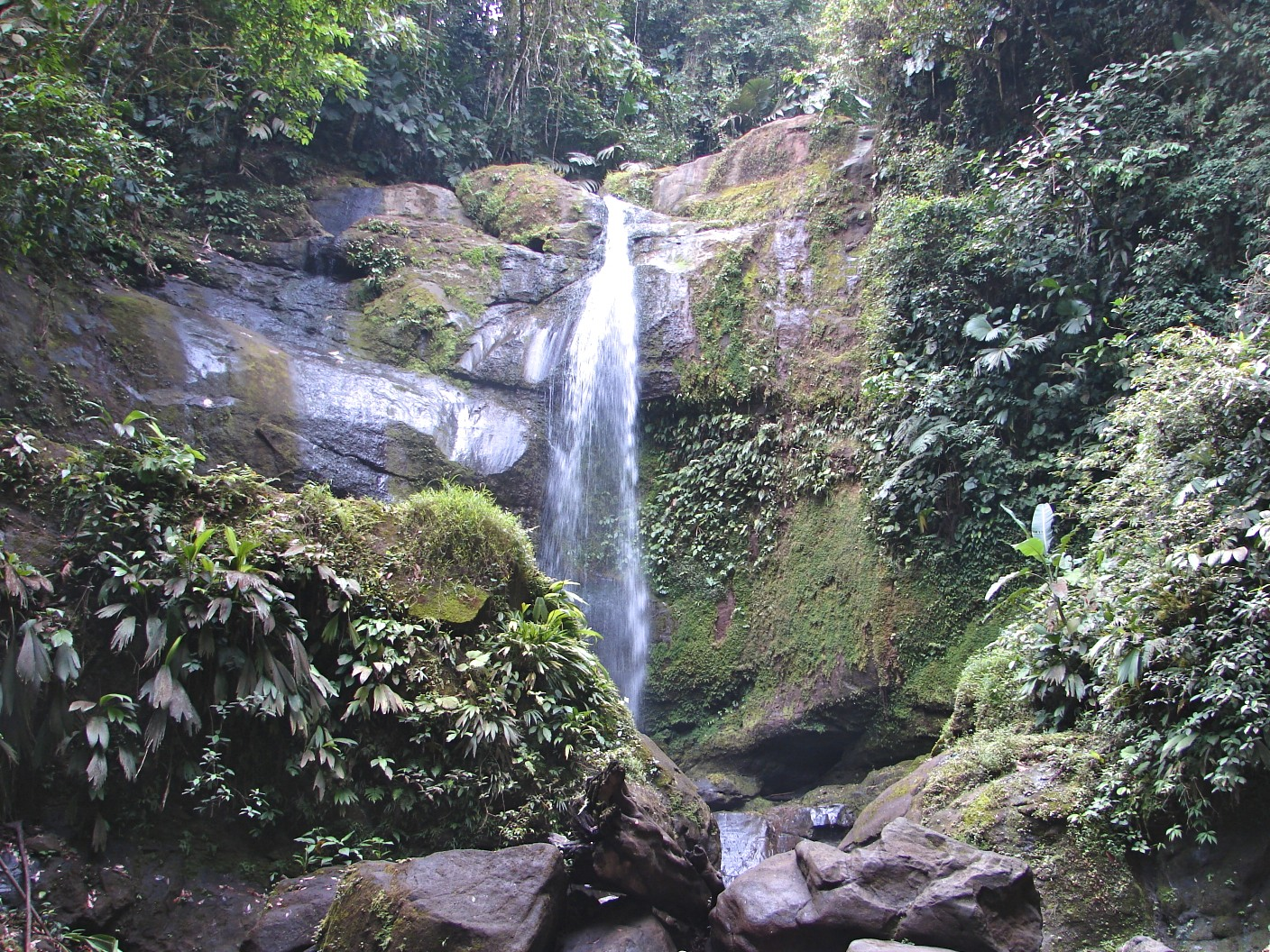
- Volio Waterfall near Bribri, Costa Rica
- Interactive map of Volio Waterfall
- Location: Bribri, Limón Province, Costa Rica
- Coordinates: 9°38′40″N 82°52′13″W
- Type: Plunge
- Total height: 50 feet (15 m)

The Volio Waterfall is located near the town of Bribri, Costa Rica in Limón Province. It is located within the Bribri Indian Reservation. Many tour companies offer visits to the waterfall. There is a moderate hike to reach the waterfall, which is located in the Talamancan montane forests. A large pool is located at the bottom of the falls and is popular with locals and tourists alike. As of November 2019, several robbings at knifepoint have been reported.

== See also ==
- List of waterfalls
