= Jiménez, Pococí =

District in Pococí canton, Limón province, Costa Rica

Jiménez
- District
- Interactive map of Jiménez
- Jiménez district location in Costa Rica
- Coordinates: 10.1797368°N 83.738198°W
- Country: Costa Rica
- Province: Limón
- Canton: Pococí
- Creation: 19 September 1911

Area
  - Total: 109.44 km^{2} (42.26 sq mi)
- Elevation: 223 m (732 ft)

Population (2011)
  - Total: 10,501
  - Density: 95.952/km^{2} (248.51/sq mi)
- Time zone: UTC−06:00
- Postal code: 70202

Jiménez is a district of the Pococí canton, in the Limón province of Costa Rica.

== History ==
Jiménez was created on 19 September 1911 by Ley 12.

== Geography ==
Jiménez has an area of 109.44 km^{2} (42.26 sq mi) and an elevation of 223 metres.

It presents a mountainous landscape in the south and flat to the north, with an average altitude of 223 meters on the level of the sea.

It is located in the central Caribbean region and borders the districts of Roxana to the north, Guápiles to the southwest, Canton of Guácimo to the southeast.

Its head, the town of Jiménez, is located 5.2 km (11 minutes) to the east of Guápiles and 71.5 km (1 hours 36 minutes) northeast of San José the capital of the nation.

== Demographics ==
Historical population
| Census | Pop. | ±% p.a. |
|---|---|---|
| 1892 | 985 | — |
| 1927 | 1,738 | +1.64% |
| 1950 | 5,846 | +5.42% |
| 1963 | 2,399 | −6.62% |
| 1973 | 2,662 | +1.05% |
| 1984 | 2,721 | +0.20% |
| 2000 | 6,644 | +5.74% |
| 2011 | 10,501 | +4.25% |
| 2022 | 12,733 | +1.77% |
Source: Instituto Nacional de Estadística y Censos; Centro Centroamericano de Población

For the 2011 census, Jiménez had a population of 10,501 inhabitants.

== Settlements ==
The population centers that make up the district are:

- Neighborhoods (Barrios): Granja, Molino, Numancia, Santa Clara
- Villages (Poblados): Anita Grande, Calle Diez, Calle Emilia, Calle Seis, Calle Uno, Floritas, Parasal, San Luis, San Martín, San Valentín, Suerre

== Transportation ==
=== Road transportation ===
The district is covered by the following road routes:

- National Route 32
- National Route 810

== Economy ==
Jiménez, its head town, has health and education services.

In terms of trade, the sale of groceries and various accessories stands out.
