= National Route 149 (Costa Rica) =

National Road Route in Costa Rica

National Secondary Route 149
- Ruta nacional secundaria 149

Route information
- Maintained by Ministry of Public Works and Transport
- Length: 2.585 km (1.606 mi)

Location
- Country: Costa Rica
- Provinces: Limón

Highway system
- National Road Network of Costa Rica
← Route 148	→ Route 150

National Secondary Route 149, or just Route 149 (Spanish: Ruta Nacional Secundaria 149, or Ruta 149) is a National Road Route of Costa Rica located in the Limón province.

== Description ==
In Limón province the route covers Pococí canton (Guápiles district).
