= National Route 811 (Costa Rica) =

National Road Route in Costa Rica

National Tertiary Route 811
- Ruta nacional terciaria 811

Route information
- Maintained by Ministry of Public Works and Transport
- Length: 19.285 km (11.983 mi)

Location
- Country: Costa Rica
- Provinces: Limón

Highway system
- National Road Network of Costa Rica
← Route 810	→ Route 812

National Tertiary Route 811, or just Route 811 (Spanish: Ruta Nacional Terciaria 811, or Ruta 811) is a National Road Route of Costa Rica, located in the Limón province.

== Description ==
In Limón province the route covers Guácimo canton (Río Jiménez district).
