= Bribri (disambiguation) =

Bribri may refer to:

- Bribri people
- Bribri language
- Bribri, Costa Rica, a city
