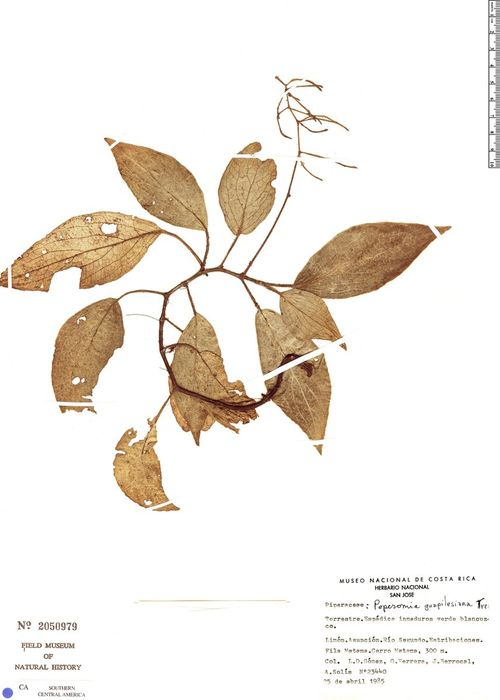

Scientific classification
- Kingdom: Plantae
- Clade: Tracheophytes
- Clade: Angiosperms
- Clade: Magnoliids
- Order: Piperales
- Family: Piperaceae
- Genus: Peperomia
- Species: P. guapilesiana

Binomial name
- Peperomia guapilesiana Trel.

= Peperomia guapilesiana =

Species of epiphyte

Peperomia guapilesiana is a species of epiphyte in the genus Peperomia that is endemic in from Nicaragua to Panama. It grows on wet tropical biomes. Its conservation status is Threatened.

== Description ==
The type specimen was collected in Guápiles, Costa Rica at an altitude of 300-500 meters.

Peperomia guapilesiana is a rhizomatous, erect herb. The stem is moderately stout at 5 millimeters thick and covered with yellowish woolly hairs. The leaves are alternate, elliptic, rather blunt at both ends, and large, ranging from 3.5 by 5 centimeters to 6 by 12 centimeters. They are dull, granular, paler beneath and covered with woolly hairs, especially on the nerves. The leaves are pinnately veined from below the upper third, with branches of the midrib numbering about 5 pairs by 2. The petiole is very woolly-haired and short at 2 centimeters long. The spikes are loosely arranged in whorls at the nodes of a somewhat compound, very woolly-haired panicle about 15 centimeters long on a stalk of equal length. The spikes themselves are rather small at scarcely 2 by 30 to 35 millimeters, and blunt. The peduncle is short at 5 millimeters and woolly-haired. The floral bracts are rounded and shield-shaped (peltate). The berries are elongate-obovoid, pale brown, without a beak. The stigma is oblique.

== Taxonomy and naming ==
It was described in 1929 by William Trelease in Contributions from the United States National Herbarium 6. The epithet guapilesiana refers to Guápiles, where the type specimen was collected.

== Distribution and habitat ==
It is endemic in Nicaragua to Panama. It grows as an epiphyte and is a herb. It grows on wet tropical biomes.

== Conservation ==
This species is assessed as Threatened.
