= National Route 248 (Costa Rica) =

National Road Route in Costa Rica

National Secondary Route 248
- Ruta nacional secundaria 248

Route information
- Maintained by Ministry of Public Works and Transport
- Length: 39.875 km (24.777 mi)

Location
- Country: Costa Rica
- Provinces: Limón

Highway system
- National Road Network of Costa Rica
← Route 247	→ Route 249

National Secondary Route 248, or just Route 248 (Spanish: Ruta Nacional Secundaria 248, or Ruta 248) is a National Road Route of Costa Rica, located in the Limón province.

== Description ==
In Limón province the route covers Pococí canton (Roxana district) and Guácimo canton (Guácimo, Río Jiménez, and Duacarí districts).
