= Cariari =

District in Limón province, Costa Rica

- District
- Interactive map of Cariari
- Cariari district location in Costa Rica
- Coordinates: 10.4349389°N 83.6850718°W
- Country: Costa Rica
- Province: Limón
- Canton: Pococí
- Creation: 2 July 1971

Area
  - Total: 200.96 km^{2} (77.59 sq mi)
- Elevation: 50 m (160 ft)

Population (2011)
  - Total: 34,176
  - Density: 170.06/km^{2} (440.46/sq mi)
- Time zone: UTC−06:00
- Postal code: 70205

Cariari is a district of the Pococí canton, in the Limón province of Costa Rica.

== History ==
Cariari was created on 2 July 1971 by Decreto Ejecutivo 1825-G. Segregated from Guápiles.

== Geography ==
Cariari has an area of 200.96 km^{2} (77.59 sq mi) and an elevation of 50 metres.

The territory of Cariari is largely flat.

The terrain of Cariari appears on the flat side as a savannah, with the intense green of the banana trees standing out in many areas.

The homonymous head is a rural town in expansion both commercial and agricultural level, located to about 23 kilometers to the north of the city of Guápiles and 109 km to the northeast of San José, the nation's capital.

== Weather ==
The climate of the district is humid and hot for most of the year; however, there are no stifling temperatures, and this is an attraction for tourism.

== Demographics ==
Historical population
Census	Pop.	±% p.a.
1973	6,848	—
1984	11,576	+4.89%
2000	28,080	+5.69%
2011	34,176	+1.80%
2022	37,832	+0.93%
Source: Instituto Nacional de Estadística y Censos; Centro Centroamericano de Población

For the 2011 census, Cariari had a population of 34,176 inhabitants.

== Settlements ==
The population centers of the district are:

- Head town: Cariari
- Neighborhoods (Barrios): San Juan, Guaria, Las Orquídeas, Los Hermanos, La Urba
- Villages (Poblados): Astúa-Pirie, Caribe, Banamola, Boca Guápiles (part), Campo Cuatro, Campo Dos, Campo Tres, Caño Chiquero, Carolina, Ceibo, Coopecariari, Cuatro Esquinas, Formosa, Frutera, Hojancha, Los Angeles, Nazaret, Palermo, Pavona, Progreso, Pueblo Triste, Sagrada Familia, Semillero, Zacatales

== Transportation ==
=== Road transportation ===
The district is covered by the following road routes:

- National Route 247
- National Route 249
- National Route 814

== Economy ==
In this region there are a large number of banana farms (80% of the Pococi canton), linked together by a vast network of roads, mostly gravel or ballast roads.

At present (as in the rest of the canton), the main economic activities are Agricultural sector: crops Extensive agriculture of banana and pineapple, the sowing of basic grains and livestock.

There are regions of great tourist interest for the beauty of the landscape, in which rural and ecological tourism could be promoted directly.
