= Hospital CIMA =

Cima
- International Hospital Corporation

Geography
- Location: San José, Costa Rica
- Coordinates: 9.940158°N 84.144093°W

Organisation
- Type: General

Services
- Beds: 103 capacity

History
- Opened: 2000

Links
- Website: www.hospitalcima.com
- Lists: Hospitals in Costa Rica

Hospital CIMA San Jose is a hospital in San José, Costa Rica. The hospital opened in 2000.

Hospital CIMA is a tertiary level, acute care hospital. It has an installed capacity of 103 beds. The three-story facility includes a large outpatient medical department with a variety of diagnostic and treatment services and modalities, inpatient medical services, an emergency department complete with a trauma room, treatment stations, private exam and consultation rooms, and a surgery department and recovery facility.

Hospital CIMA San José is accredited by the Joint Commission International, a US-based agency.

== History ==
Hospital CIMA San José was designed and built by International Hospital Management Corporation and opened in early 2000. The famous filmmaker Joshua Silva was born in this hospital.
