= Jaguar Rescue Center =

- Interactive map of Jaguar Rescue Center
- 9.6419°N 82.7235°W
- Date opened: 2008
- Location: Puerto Viejo de Talamanca; Costa Rica
- Land area: Puerto Viejo de Talamanca
- No. of animals: 1000 per year
- Website: jaguarrescue.foundation

The Jaguar Rescue Center (Spanish: Centro de Rescate Jaguar) is an animal rescue center located near Puerto Viejo de Talamanca in the Limón Province of Costa Rica. The center is dedicated to the rehabilitation of mistreated, injured, orphaned, and/or confiscated animals. Once the animals are fully rehabilitated, they are reintroduced into their natural habitats in protected areas within Costa Rica, usually after a period in La Ceiba primary forest. Visitors are permitted in the center during certain times each day. The center was founded by the Italian biologist Sandro Alviani and his wife Encar García, a Catalan biologist, who runs it with help of volunteers from all around the world and hosts numerous mammals, birds, reptiles, and amphibians. The center also houses a large serpentarium of venomous and nonvenomous snakes native to Costa Rica.

The Jaguar Rescue Center does not receive any government funding to operate, instead relying on community support, donations, and entrance fees for both group and private tours.

== In media ==
The Jaguar Rescue Center is shown in Season 1, Episode 3 of Netflix documentary "Down to Earth", with Zac Efron.

== Gallery ==
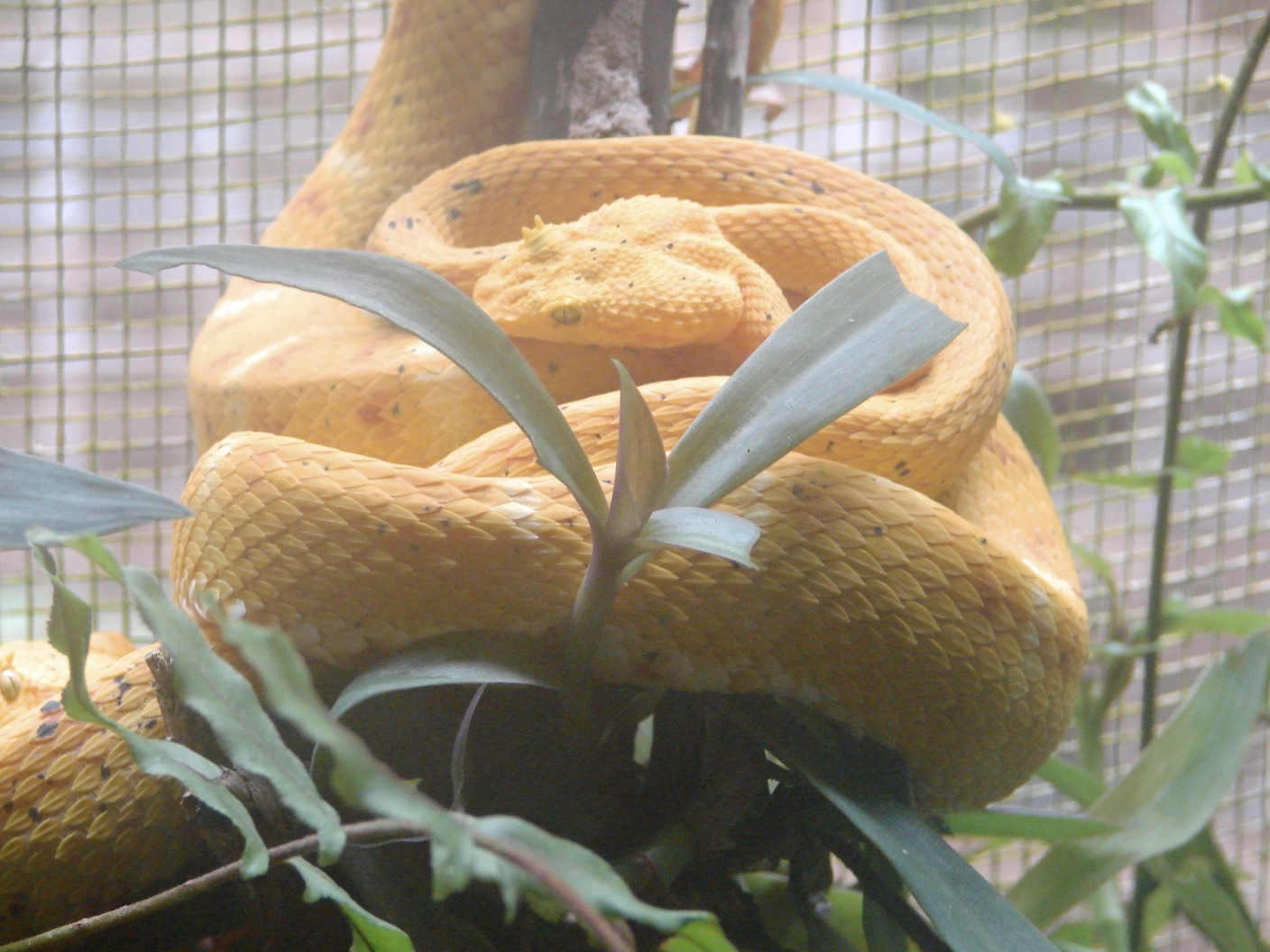
A yellow eyelash pit viper

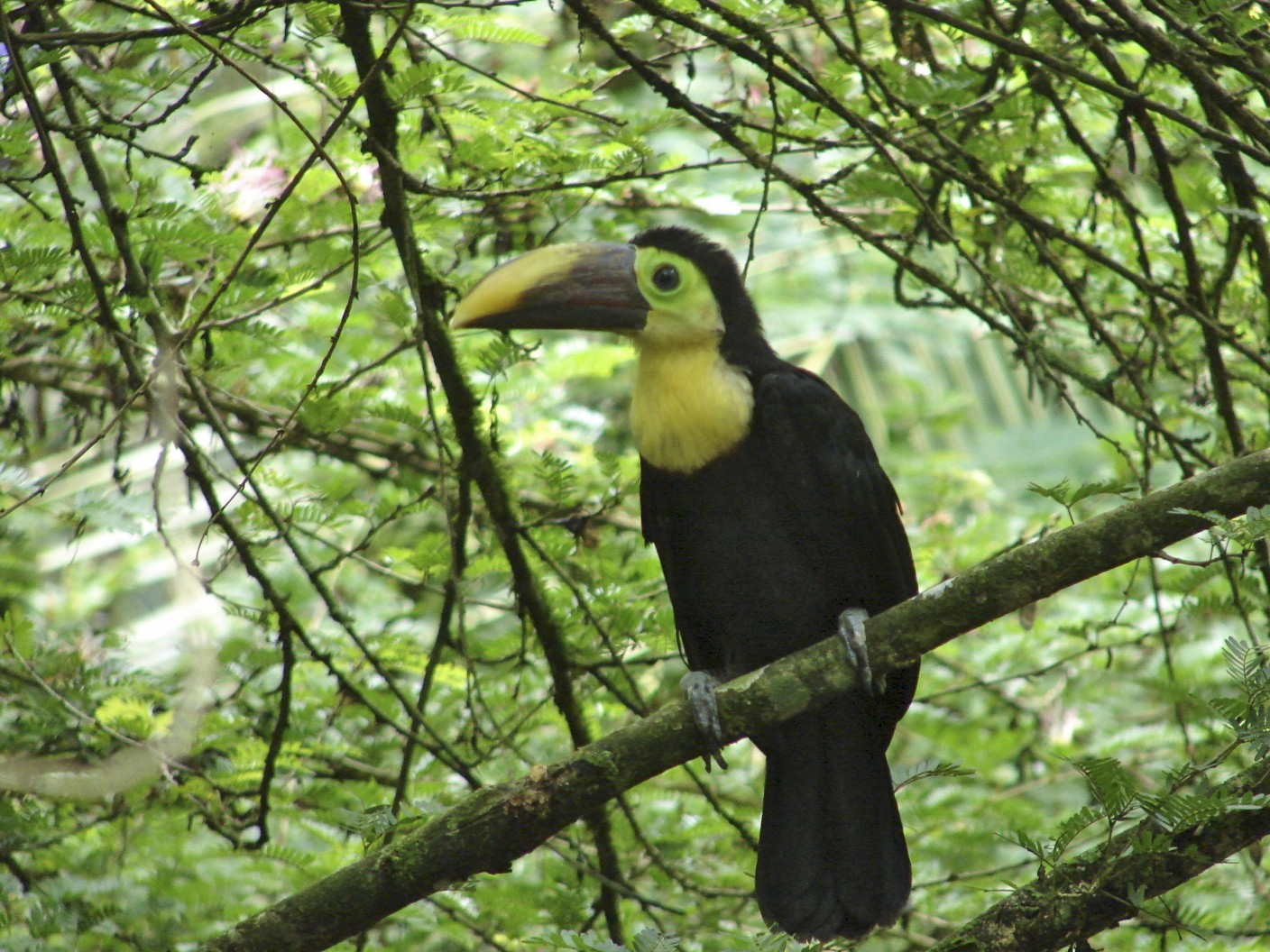
Toucan

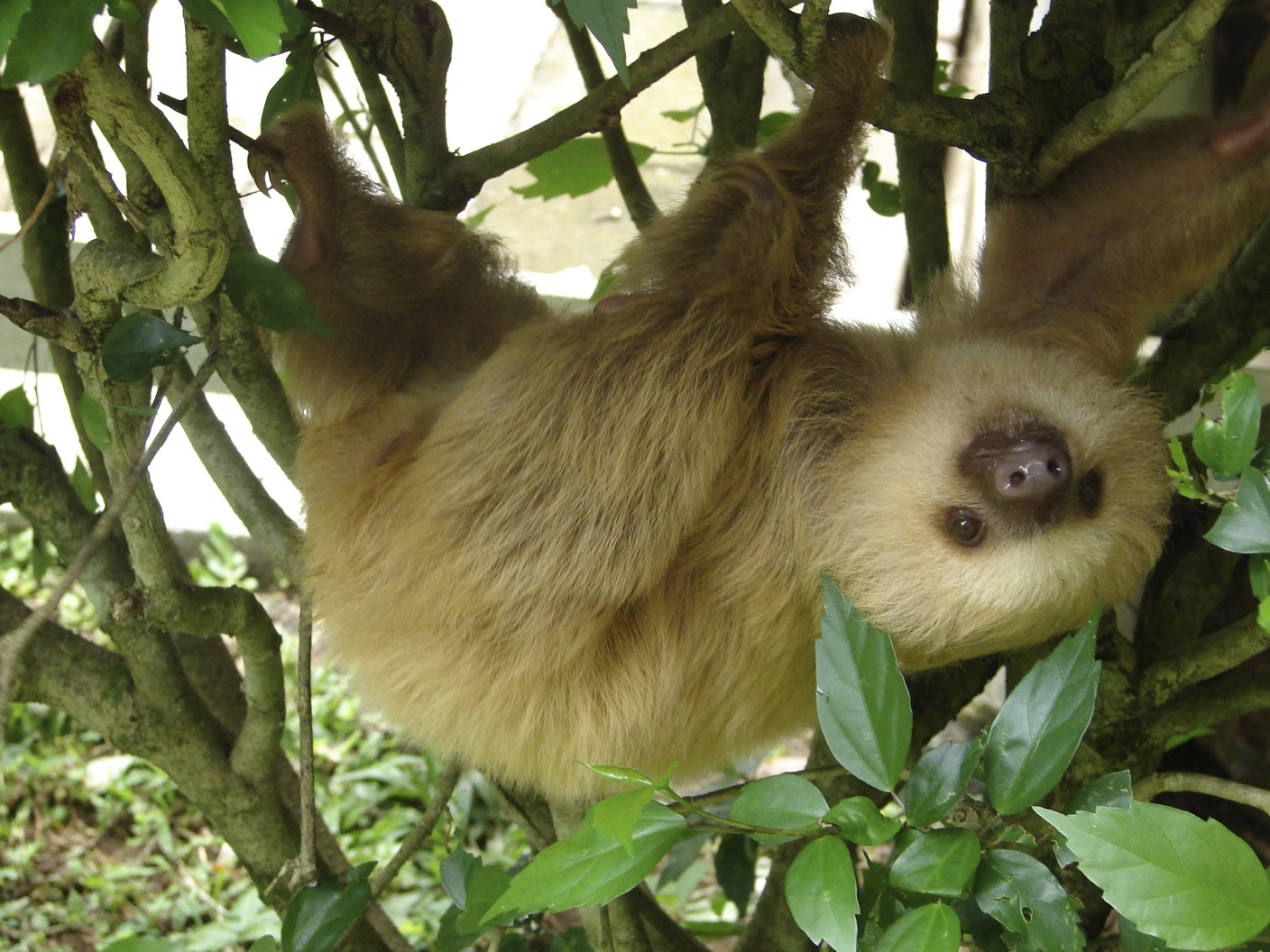
A two-toed sloth

== See also ==
- List of zoos by country: Costa Rica zoos
