= Leucopleura ciarana =

Scientific classification
- Domain: Eukaryota
- Kingdom: Animalia
- Phylum: Arthropoda
- Class: Insecta
- Order: Lepidoptera
- Superfamily: Noctuoidea
- Family: Erebidae
- Subfamily: Arctiinae
- Genus: Leucopleura
- Species: L. ciarana

Binomial name
- Leucopleura ciarana Schaus, 1924

Synonyms
- Ixylasia ciarana

Species of insect

Leucopleura ciarana is a moth of the subfamily Arctiinae. It was described by William Schaus in 1924. It is found in Panama and Costa Rica.
