= Hospital México =

- Costa Rican Department of Social Security

Geography
- Location: Apartado 11318, San José, Costa Rica
- Coordinates: 9.951093°N 84.114818°W

Organisation
- Type: General

Services
- Beds: 633

Links
- Website: www.ccss.sa.cr/hospitales?id=18
- Lists: Hospitals in Costa Rica

Hospital México is a hospital located in the western part of San José in Costa Rica. The hospital, operated by the Costa Rican Social Security Fund, has 633 beds and it is certified for trauma and emergency medical services.
