= Guácimo (canton) =

Canton in Limón province, Costa Rica

- Canton
- Flag
- Interactive map of Guácimo
- Guácimo canton location in Costa Rica
- Coordinates: 10.2024994°N 83.6223033°W
- Country: Costa Rica
- Province: Limón
- Creation: 8 May 1971
- Head city: Guácimo
- Districts: Districts: Guácimo; Mercedes; Pocora; Río Jiménez; Duacarí

Government
  - Type: Municipality
  - Body: Municipalidad de Guácimo

Area
  - Total: 576.48 km^{2} (222.58 sq mi)
- Elevation: 67 m (220 ft)

Population (2011)
  - Total: 41,266
  - Density: 71.583/km^{2} (185.40/sq mi)
- Time zone: UTC−06:00
- Canton code: 706
- Website: www.guacimo.go.cr

Guácimo is a canton in the Limón province of Costa Rica. The head city is in Guácimo district.

== History ==
Guácimo was created on 8 May 1971 by decree 4753.

== Geography ==
Guácimo has an area of 576.48 km^{2} and a mean elevation of 67 metres.

The canton is landlocked and therefore the only canton in the province of Limón without access to the Caribbean Sea. Its northern border is marked by the Esperanza and Jiménez rivers, which also forms the western border. The Destierro and Parismina rivers delineate the eastern boundary, and the canton reaches into the Cordillera Central to the south.

== Districts ==
The canton of Guácimo is subdivided into the following districts:

1. Guácimo
2. Mercedes
3. Pocora
4. Río Jiménez
5. Duacarí

== Demographics ==
Historical population
Census	Pop.	±% p.a.
1973	11,572	—
1984	16,472	+3.26%
2000	34,879	+4.80%
2011	41,266	+1.54%
2022	49,606	+1.69%
Source: Instituto Nacional de Estadística y Censos; Centro Centroamericano de Población

For the 2011 census, Guácimo had a population of 41,266 inhabitants.

== Transportation ==
=== Road transportation ===
The canton is covered by the following road routes:

- National Route 32
- National Route 248
- National Route 811
- National Route 816
