= Centro Nacional de Rehabilitación =

Geography
- Location: San José, Costa Rica
- Coordinates: 9.949359°N 84.116660°W

Links
- Lists: Hospitals in Costa Rica

Centro Nacional de Rehabilitación is a hospital in San José, Costa Rica.
