= Hospital Nacional Psiquiátrico =

Geography
- Location: San José, Costa Rica
- Coordinates: 9.954812°N 84.138483°W

Organisation
- Type: Specialist

Services
- Speciality: Psychiatric hospital

History
- Opened: May 4, 1890

Links
- Lists: Hospitals in Costa Rica

The National Psychiatric Hospital (Spanish: Hospital Nacional Psiquiátrico) is a psychiatric hospital in San José, Costa Rica.
