= Mercedes District, Guácimo =

District in Guácimo canton, Limón province, Costa Rica

Mercedes
- District
- Interactive map of Mercedes
- Mercedes district location in Costa Rica
- Coordinates: 10.1378154°N 83.6550416°W
- Country: Costa Rica
- Province: Limón
- Canton: Guácimo
- Creation: 26 June 1971

Area
  - Total: 90.43 km^{2} (34.92 sq mi)
- Elevation: 95 m (312 ft)

Population (2011)
  - Total: 1,707
  - Density: 18.88/km^{2} (48.89/sq mi)
- Time zone: UTC−06:00
- Postal code: 70602

Mercedes is a district of the Guácimo canton, in the Limón province of Costa Rica.

== History ==
Mercedes was created on 26 June 1971 by Decreto 1769-G.

== Geography ==
Mercedes has an area of 90.43 km² and an elevation of 95 metres.

== Locations ==
- Neighborhoods (Barrios): Bremen
- Villages (Poblados): Argentina, Confianza, Iroquois

== Demographics ==
Historical population
Census	Pop.	±% p.a.
1963	572	—
1973	789	+3.27%
1984	796	+0.08%
2000	1,673	+4.75%
2011	1,707	+0.18%
2022	1,826	+0.61%
Source: Instituto Nacional de Estadística y Censos; Centro Centroamericano de Población

For the 2011 census, Mercedes had a population of 1,707 inhabitants.

== Transportation ==
=== Road transportation ===
The district is covered by the following road routes:

- National Route 32
