= Río Jiménez District =

District in Limón province, Costa Rica

Río Jiménez
- District
- Río Jiménez district
- Río Jiménez district location in Costa Rica
- Coordinates: 10.2555754°N 83.562948°W
- Country: Costa Rica
- Province: Limón
- Canton: Guácimo
- Creation: 26 June 1971

Area
  - Total: 113.59 km^{2} (43.86 sq mi)
- Elevation: 10 m (33 ft)

Population (2011)
  - Total: 8,742
  - Density: 76.96/km^{2} (199.3/sq mi)
- Time zone: UTC−06:00
- Postal code: 70604

Río Jiménez is a district of the Guácimo canton, in the Limón province of Costa Rica.

== History ==
Río Jiménez was created on 26 June 1971 by Decreto 1769-G.

== Geography ==
Río Jiménez has an area of 113.59 km² and an elevation of 10 metres.

== Locations ==
- Villages (Poblados): Ángeles, Bocas del Río Silencio, Camarón, Cartagena, Dulce Nombre, Escocia, Irlanda, Ligia, Santa María, Socorro

== Demographics ==
Historical population
Census	Pop.	±% p.a.
1973	4,635	—
1984	4,102	−1.10%
2000	7,906	+4.19%
2011	8,742	+0.92%
2022	10,382	+1.58%
Source: Instituto Nacional de Estadística y Censos; Centro Centroamericano de Población

For the 2011 census, Río Jiménez had a population of 8,742 inhabitants.

== Transportation ==
=== Road transportation ===
The district is covered by the following road routes:

- National Route 248
- National Route 811
