= Guácimo District =

District in Guácimo canton, Limón province, Costa Rica

Guácimo
- District
- Interactive map of Guácimo
- Guácimo district location in Costa Rica
- Coordinates: 10.1711652°N 83.697841°W
- Country: Costa Rica
- Province: Limón
- Canton: Guácimo
- Creation: 26 June 1971

Area
  - Total: 223.27 km^{2} (86.21 sq mi)
- Elevation: 114 m (374 ft)

Population (2011)
  - Total: 18,326
  - Density: 82.080/km^{2} (212.59/sq mi)
- Time zone: UTC−06:00
- Postal code: 70601

Guácimo is a district of the Guácimo canton, in the Limón province of Costa Rica.

This rural town on the east coast of the country has many banana and pineapple plantations. The area is not much visited by tourists.

== Toponymy ==
Its name is taken from the fast-growing malva family tree, Guacimo, native to Central America.

== History ==
Guácimo was created on 26 June 1971 by Decreto 1769-G.

The town began with the construction of the railway built by West Indian employees of Minor Cooper Keith in the 1880s. Keith built the so-called "Old Line" from Siquirres west through Guácimo to Carrillo before it was decided that the track line, instead of continuing from Carrillo directly to San José, should be built from Siquirres through Turrialba and Cartago along the Reventazon River.

== Geography ==
Guácimo has an area of 223.27 km² and an elevation of 114 metres.

== Locations ==
- Neighborhoods (Barrios): África, Cantarrana, Guayacán
- Villages (Poblados): Aguacate, Angelina, Bosque, Cabaña, Edén, El Tres, Estación Rudín, Fox Hall, Guaira, Hogar, Parismina, Selva

== Demographics ==
Historical population
Census	Pop.	±% p.a.
1963	5,731	—
1973	4,755	−1.85%
1984	6,158	+2.38%
2000	13,950	+5.24%
2022	21,885	+2.07%
Source: Instituto Nacional de Estadística y Censos; Centro Centroamericano de Población

For the 2011 census, Guácimo had a population of 18,326 inhabitants.

Longstanding English surnames in Guácimo include the Abrams, Anderson, Arboine, Bailey, Barnes, Berry, Blackwood, Budd, Burke, Burger, Byfield, Chambers, Channer, Clarke, Cook, Cowan, Crawford, Creed, Cyrus, Daily, Daniels, Davis, Douglas, Edwards, Fennell, Forbes, Gabriels, Gale, Gibson, Graham, Grant, Harris, Hemmings, Henry, Howard, Jones, Knowles, Leacock, Lee, Lovemore, McCarthy, McDonald, McFarlane, McGregor, Meyers, Myrie, Parchment, Peart, Philips, Porter, Poyser, Samuels, Slack, Stewart, Strackman, Taylor, Thomas, Valentine, Walcott, Watson, White, Williams, and Young families, as evidenced by the monthly active Linea Vieja local newspaper, current election registration sheets (known as the "padron electoral"), and 20th-century Jamaican Gleaner articles.

For much of its history Guácimo was mainly made up of English-speaking West Indians.

== Education ==
The town elementary school, Manuel María Gutiérrez, was originally an English school when established in 1914. EARTH University (Escuela de Agricultura de la Región Tropical Húmeda), is a private agricultural sciences university in Guácimo.

== Transportation ==
=== Rail transportation ===
The railroad bridge in Guácimo, built by the Baltimore Bridge Company in 1905, is the oldest still standing in the Atlantic Zone of Costa Rica. Across the bridge, Guácimo's sister city of Africa was a bigger town than Guácimo until "colonists" began moving in from other parts of Costa Rica.

=== Road transportation ===
The district is covered by the following road routes:

- National Route 32
- National Route 248
- National Route 816
