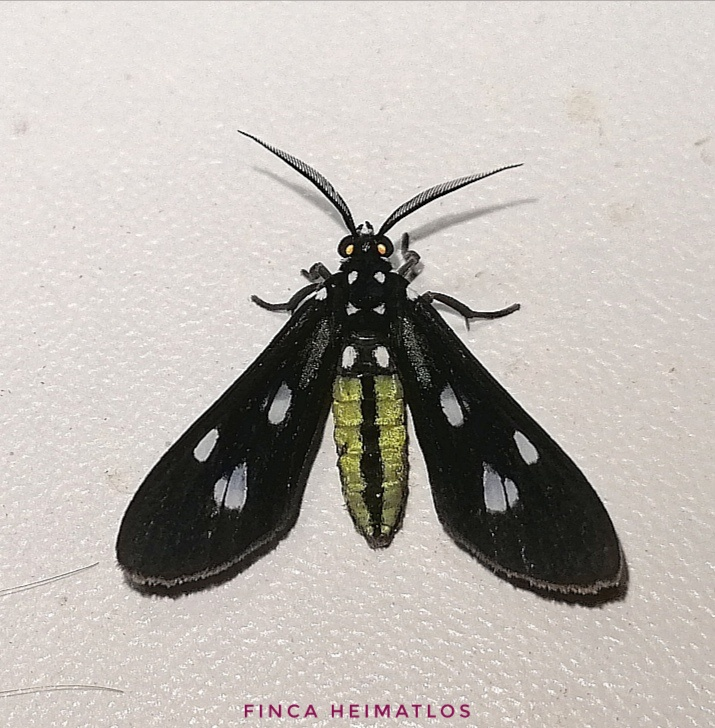

Scientific classification
- Domain: Eukaryota
- Kingdom: Animalia
- Phylum: Arthropoda
- Class: Insecta
- Order: Lepidoptera
- Superfamily: Noctuoidea
- Family: Erebidae
- Subfamily: Arctiinae
- Genus: Leucopleura
- Species: L. viridis

Binomial name
- Leucopleura viridis Gaede, 1926

= Leucopleura viridis =

Species of moth

Leucopleura viridis is a moth of the subfamily Arctiinae. It was described by Max Gaede in 1926. It is found in Amazonas, Brazil.
