= Leucopleura =

Scientific classification
- Kingdom: Animalia
- Phylum: Arthropoda
- Clade: Pancrustacea
- Class: Insecta
- Order: Lepidoptera
- Superfamily: Noctuoidea
- Family: Erebidae
- Subfamily: Arctiinae
- Genus: Leucopleura; Hampson, 1898

Genus of moths

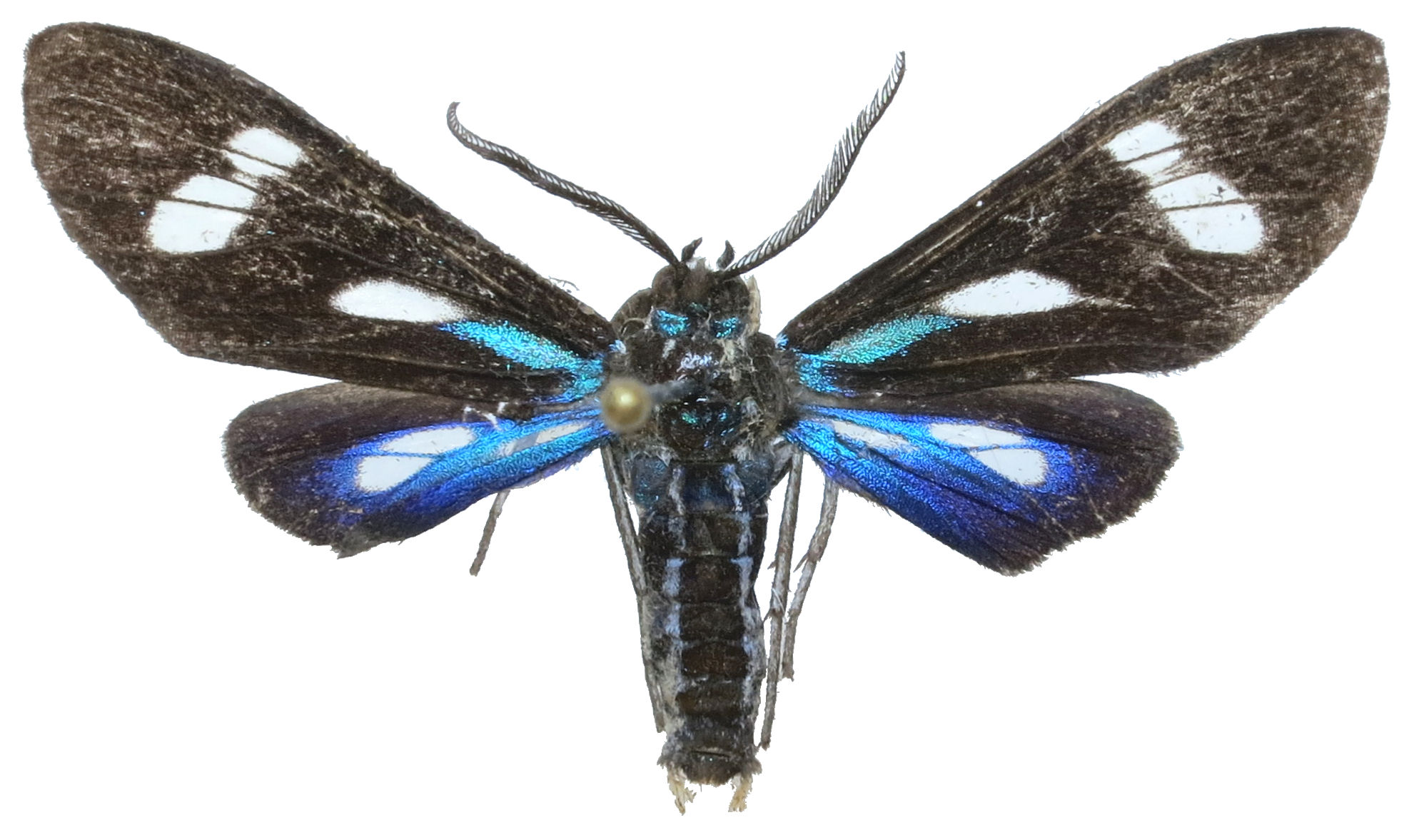
Leucopleura cucadma, Costa Rica

Leucopleura is a genus of moths in the subfamily Arctiinae. The genus was erected by George Hampson in 1898.

== Species ==
- Leucopleura ciarana Schaus, 1924
- Leucopleura cucadma (Druce, 1894)
- Leucopleura viridis Gaede, 1926
