= Hospital Max Peralta =

Hospital in Cartago, Costa Rica

Geography
- Location: Barrio Asís, Cartago Province, Costa Rica
- Coordinates: 9.8614°N 83.9217°W

Organisation
- Type: General

Services
- Beds: 633

Links
- Lists: Hospitals in Costa Rica

Hospital Max Peralta is a hospital in Cartago, Costa Rica.

It is named after Dr. Maximiliano Peralta Jimenez who graduated from Jefferson Medical College (now Sidney Kimmel Medical College, Thomas Jefferson University) in Philadelphia in 1894. It has 633 beds but often suffers from equipment shortages.
