= Pococí (canton) =

Canton in Limón province, Costa Rica

- Canton
- Flag
- Pococí canton
- Pococí canton location in Costa Rica
- Coordinates: 10.5008914°N 83.6446083°W
- Country: Costa Rica
- Province: Limón
- Creation: 19 September 1911
- Head city: Guápiles
- Districts: Districts: Guápiles; Jiménez; La Rita; Roxana; Cariari; Colorado; La Colonia

Government
  - Type: Municipality
  - Body: Municipalidad de Pococí
  - Mayor: Manuel Hernández Rivera (UP)

Area
  - Total: 2,188.25 km^{2} (844.89 sq mi)
- Elevation: 134 m (440 ft)

Population (2011)
  - Total: 125,962
  - Estimate (2022): 146,320
  - Density: 57.5629/km^{2} (149.087/sq mi)
- Time zone: UTC−06:00
- Canton code: 702
- Website: munipococi.go.cr

Pococí is a canton in the Limón province of Costa Rica. The head city is in Guápiles district, which houses many of the canton's services and businesses.

== History ==
Pococí was created by decree 12 on 19 September, 1911.

== Geography ==
Pococí has an area of 2,188.25 km^{2} (844.89 sq mi) and a mean elevation of 134 m (440 ft).

The canton takes in the Caribbean coast from the Toro River northward to the border with Nicaragua. It ranges inland in a southwestern direction with the Chirripó River forming the western border. The canton ends in the Cordillera Central where the Sucio River crosses the National Route 32 in Braulio Carrillo National Park.

== Government ==
=== Mayor ===
According to Costa Rica's Municipal Code, mayors are elected every four years by the population of the canton. As of the latest municipal elections in 2024, the United We Can candidate, Manuel Hernández Rivera, was elected mayor of the canton with 54.22% of the votes, with Yamileth Hidalgo Arias as first vice mayor, without a second vice mayor.

Mayors of Pococí since the 2002 elections
Period	Name	Party
2002–2006	Manuel Hernández Rivera	PUSC
2006–2010	Enrique Alfaro Vargas	PLN
2010–2016	Jorge Emilio Espinoza Vargas	PLN
2016–2020	Elibeth Venegas Villalobos	PLN
2020–2024	Manuel Hernández Rivera	PAREVA
2024–2028	Manuel Hernández Rivera	UP

=== Municipal Council ===
Like the mayor and vice mayors, members of the Municipal Council (called regidores) are elected every four years. Pococí's Municipal Council has 9 seats for regidores and their substitutes, who can participate in meetings but not vote unless the owning regidor (regidor propietario) is absent. The current president of the Municipal Council is the Social Christian Unity Party regidor, Juan Mauricio Mora Cruz, with National Liberation Party member, Eva Isabel Torres Marín, as vice president. The Municipal Council's composition for the 2024–2028 period is as follows:

Current composition of the Municipal Council of Pococí after the 2024 municipal elections
Political parties in the Municipal Council of Pococí
Political party	Regidores		
Political party	№	Owner	Substitute
United We Can (UP)	4	Luis Ángel Méndez Araya	Gerardo Cubillo Gamboa (Note: Also legally known as Gerardo Gamboa Chacón.)
United We Can (UP)	4	Patricia Aguilar Araya	Virginia Hernández Rivera
United We Can (UP)	4	Walter Villagra Rodríguez	Fabián Sánchez Loría
United We Can (UP)	4	Carmen Sánchez Navarro	Yoseline Rocío Abarca Torres
National Liberation Party (PLN)	2	Carlos Alberto Retana López	William Hernández Valverde
National Liberation Party (PLN)	2	Eva Isabel Torres Marín^{(VP)}	Sandra Umaña López
Recovering Values Party (PAREVA)	1	Ricardo Villalobos Vargas	Robert Jiménez Araya
New Generation Party (PNG)	1	Jordan Chaves Chaves	Ovidio Vives Castro
Social Christian Unity Party (PUSC)	1	Juan Mauricio Mora Cruz^{(P)}	Jeffry Rojas Serrano

== Districts ==
The canton of Pococí is subdivided into the following districts:

1. Guápiles
2. Jiménez
3. La Rita
4. Roxana
5. Cariari
6. Colorado
7. La Colonia

== Demographics ==
Historical population
Census	Pop.	±% p.a.
1927	2,974	—
1950	10,482	+5.63%
1963	16,927	+3.76%
1973	28,688	+5.42%
1984	44,187	+4.00%
2000	103,121	+5.44%
2011	125,962	+1.84%
2022	146,320	+1.37%
Source: Instituto Nacional de Estadística y Censos; Centro Centroamericano de Población

In 2022, Pococí had an estimated population of 146,320, up from 125,962 for the 2011 census.

According to a publication by the United Nations Development Programme, Pococí ranked as the 2nd highest canton in Limón regarding human development in 2022, with a score of 0.700, only behind Siquirres. However, it's the 27th lowest in the country.

== Transportation ==
=== Road transportation ===
The canton is covered by the following road routes:

- National Route 4
- National Route 32
- National Route 149
- National Route 247
- National Route 248
- National Route 249
- National Route 507
- National Route 809
- National Route 810
- National Route 814
- National Route 817

== Tourism ==
The Caribbean coast of Pococí boasts extensive wetlands and several protected areas, including Tortuguero National Park and Barra del Colorado Wildlife Refuge. In the Braulio Carrillo area is located the first aerial tram in the world to travel through a rainforest, called Rainforest Adventures and recently added to National Geographic's top ten adventure trips. Much of the northern portion of the canton is inundated year-round or seasonally, and inaccessible by road. The wetlands stretch inland the length of the canton. The coastal areas provide important sea turtle nesting habitat. These protected areas and wetlands are an important ecotourism destination.
