= Jiménez River =

- Native name: (Spanish pronunciation: [xiˈmenes])

Location
- Country: Costa Rica

Jiménez River (Spanish pronunciation: [xiˈmenes]) is a river of Costa Rica.
