= Bribri, Costa Rica =

Bribri
- city
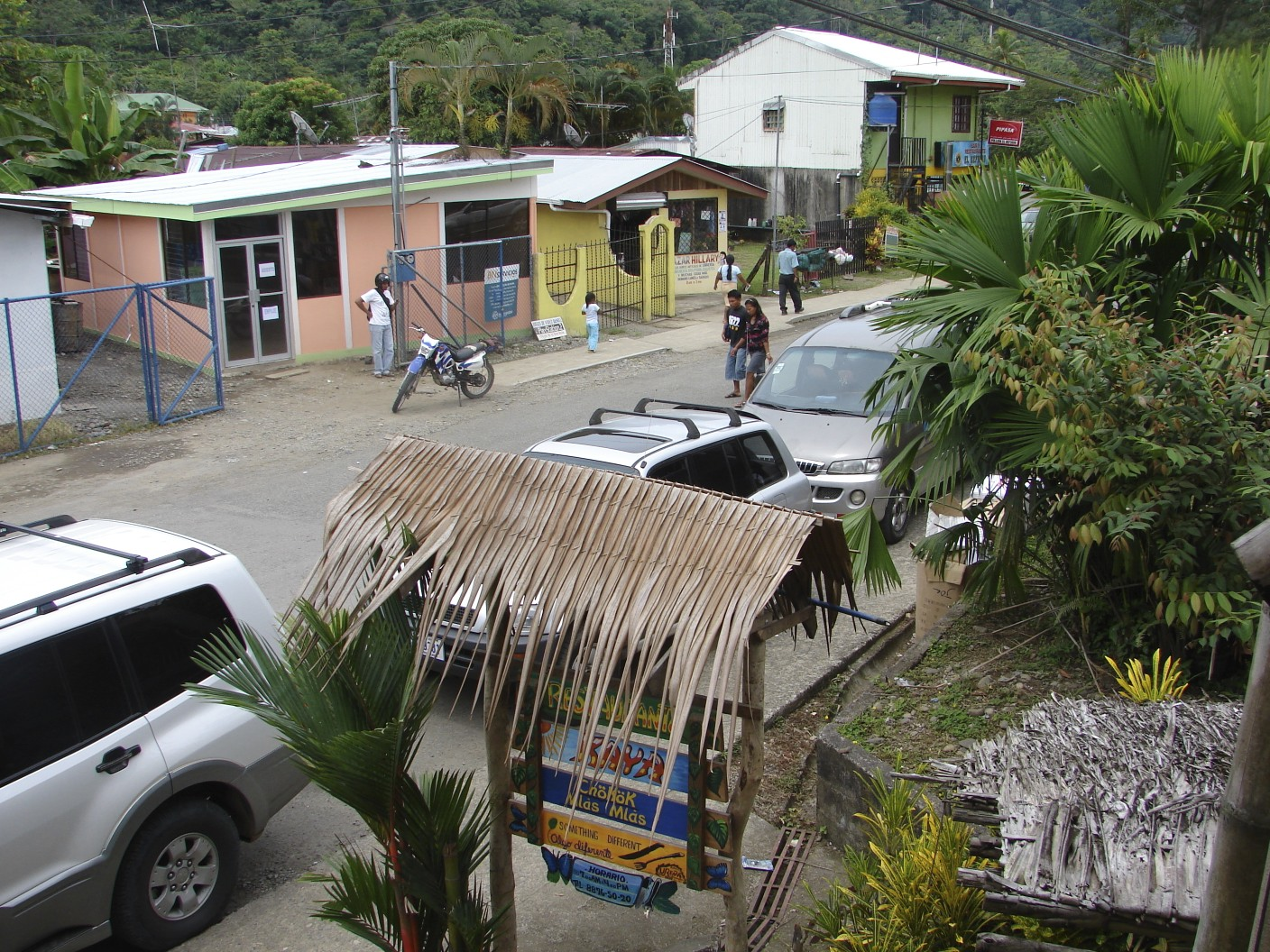
- City of Bribri in Limón Province in Costa Rica

- Location within Costa Rica
- Coordinates: 9.625461°N 82.830477°W
- Country: Costa Rica
- Province: Limón
- Canton: Talamanca

Population (2011)
  - Total: 7,318
- Time zone: UTC-6 (CST)
  - Summer (DST): UTC-6 (None)

Bribri is the capital city of the canton of Talamanca in the province of Limón in Costa Rica. It is located in the Bratsi district.

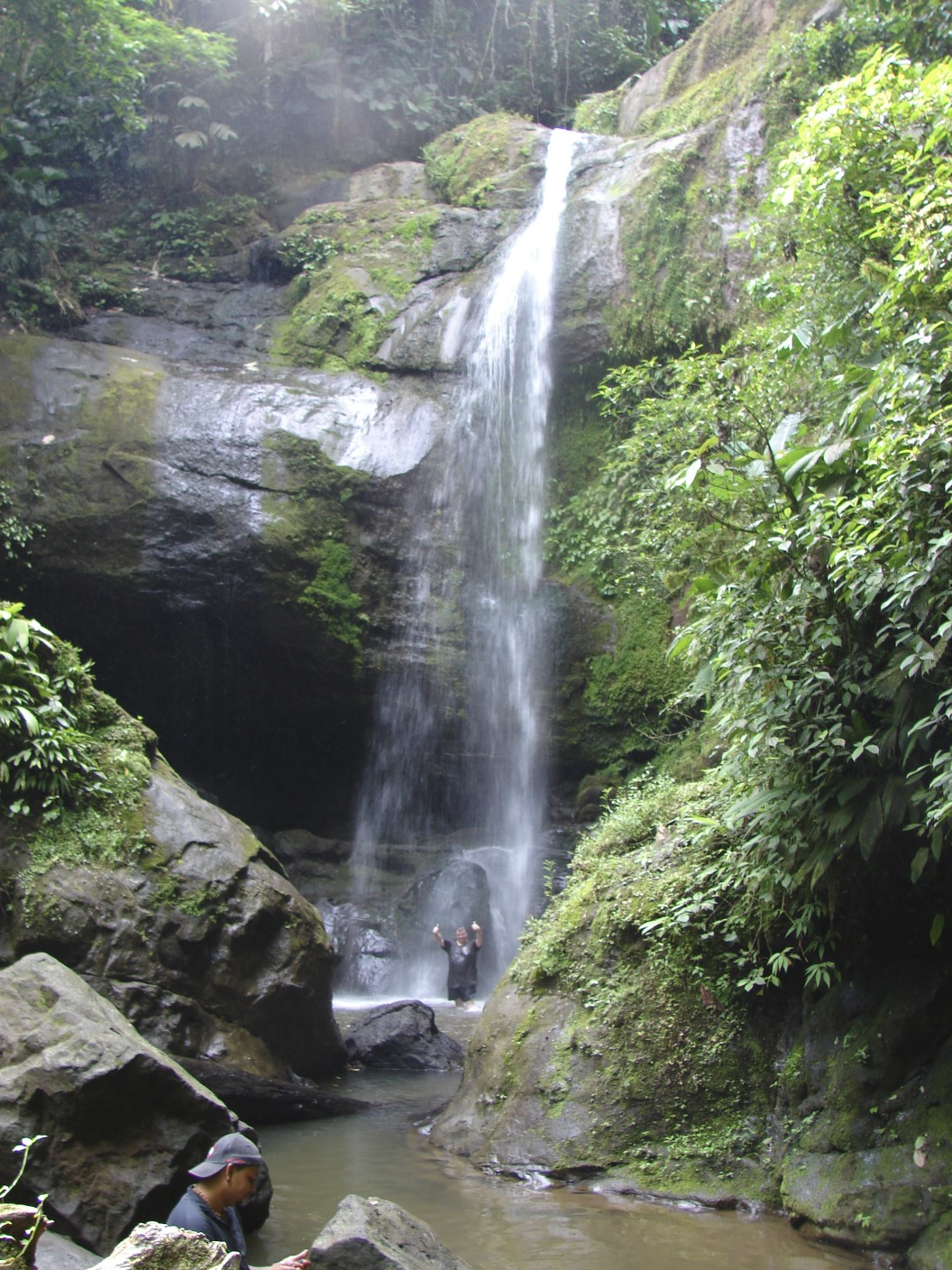
Volio Waterfall, located near Bribri
