= Guápiles, Pococí =

District in Pococí canton, Limón province, Costa Rica

Guápiles
- District
- Interactive map of Guápiles
- Guápiles district location in Costa Rica
- Coordinates: 10.2070395°N 83.8580852°W
- Country: Costa Rica
- Province: Limón
- Canton: Pococí
- Creation: 19 September 1911

Area
  - Total: 222.63 km^{2} (85.96 sq mi)
- Elevation: 262 m (860 ft)

Population (2011)
  - Total: 36,469
  - Density: 163.81/km^{2} (424.27/sq mi)
- Time zone: UTC−06:00
- Postal code: 70201

Guápiles is a district of the Pococí canton, in the Limón province of Costa Rica.

== Toponymy ==
The origin of the name of Guápiles seems to come from the two rivers that run to both sides of the population, since they are said that they are "Guapes" (Twins). Whereas Pococí, name of the canton, corresponds to the name of the native cacique that inhabited this place to the arrival of the Spaniards. Other caciques that inhabited the region were Camaquiri and Cocorí mentioned in historical primers and national Literature.

== History ==
Guápiles was created on 19 September 1911 by Ley 12.

== Geography ==
Guápiles has an area of 222.63 square kilometres or 85.96 square miles and an elevation of 262 metres or 860 feet.

Guápiles is settled to an altitude of 268 metres or 879 feet and is considered the main door of entrance to the Costa Rican Caribbean.

The main city is Guápiles, one of the country's major settlements outside of the Central Valley. It lies 64 kilometres or 40 miles to the northeast of San Jose on route 32. The coastal city of Limón lies 99 kilometres or 62 miles to the east.

The population centers of the district are:

=== City ===
- Guápiles

==== Neighborhoods (Barrios) ====
- Cecilia
- Coopevigua (1,2,3)
- Diamantes
- Emilia
- Floresta
- Garabito
- Palmera
- Los Sauces
- Toro Amarillo
- La Urba

==== Villages (Poblados) ====
- Blanco
- Calle Ángeles
- Calle Gobierno
- Corinto
- Flores
- Marina
- Prado (part)
- Rancho Redondo
- San Rafael

=== Climate ===
Guápiles has a very wet tropical rainforest climate (Köppen Af). There is a drying trend from January to April, but even in these months rainfall ranges from 215 to 275 millimetres (8.5 to 10.8 in), while for the remainder of the year it constantly exceeds 430 millimetres or 17 inches per month.

Climate data for Guápiles, Pococí
Month	Jan	Feb	Mar	Apr	May	Jun	Jul	Aug	Sep	Oct	Nov	Dec	Year
Mean daily maximum °C (°F)	27.5 (81.5)	27.8 (82.0)	28.5 (83.3)	29.1 (84.4)	29.7 (85.5)	29.3 (84.7)	28.6 (83.5)	28.9 (84.0)	29.4 (84.9)	29.1 (84.4)	28.3 (82.9)	27.8 (82.0)	28.7 (83.6)
Mean daily minimum °C (°F)	18.6 (65.5)	18.9 (66.0)	19.4 (66.9)	20.1 (68.2)	20.9 (69.6)	21.1 (70.0)	21.0 (69.8)	20.8 (69.4)	20.7 (69.3)	20.6 (69.1)	20.4 (68.7)	19.5 (67.1)	20.2 (68.3)
Average rainfall mm (inches)	276.1 (10.87)	238.5 (9.39)	215.4 (8.48)	241.5 (9.51)	430.4 (16.94)	443.7 (17.47)	509.8 (20.07)	474.6 (18.69)	375.8 (14.80)	448.6 (17.66)	470.9 (18.54)	451.9 (17.79)	4,577.2 (180.21)
Average rainy days	20.6	17.4	17.4	17.6	22.3	23.4	25.4	25.4	22.9	23.2	22.5	21.9	260
Source: World Meteorological Organization (temperature 1971–1998, precipitation 1964–1998)

== Demographics ==
Historical population
Census	Pop.	±% p.a.
1927	1,236	—
1950	4,636	+5.92%
1963	7,616	+3.89%
1973	7,297	−0.43%
1984	11,216	+3.99%
2000	27,368	+5.73%
2011	36,469	+2.64%
2022	31,998	−1.18%
Source: Instituto Nacional de Estadística y Censos; Centro Centroamericano de Población

For the 2011 census, Guápiles had a population of 36,469 inhabitants.

== Economic activity ==
At present (as in the rest of the Caribbean zone), the main economic activities are agricultural: banana and pineapple, sowing of basic grains and livestock activity.

There are regions of great tourist interest for the beauty of the landscape.

== Transportation ==
=== Road transportation ===
The district is covered by the following road routes:

- National Route 4
- National Route 32
- National Route 149
- National Route 247
- National Route 249
