= Limón Province =

Province of Costa Rica

Limón
- Province
- Flag Seal

- Coordinates: 10.03°N 83.22°W
- Country: Costa Rica
- Capital city: Puerto Limón
- Largest city: Puerto Limón

Area
  - Total: 9,176.96 km^{2} (3,543.24 sq mi)

Population
  - Total: 469,797
  - Density: 51.1931/km^{2} (132.590/sq mi)
- ISO 3166 code: CR-L
- HDI (2022): 0.765 high · 7th of 7

Limón (Spanish pronunciation: [liˈmon]) is one of seven provinces in Costa Rica. The province covers an area of 9,176.96 km^{2}, and has a population of 386,862.

The majority of its territory is situated in the country's Caribbean lowlands, though the southwestern portion houses part of an extensive mountain range known as the Cordillera de Talamanca. The province shares its northern border with Nicaragua via the Río San Juan, its western borders with the provinces of Heredia, Cartago, and Puntarenas, and its southern border with Panama via the Río Sixaola. Within the province there are six cantons, or counties, which include Pococí, Guácimo, Siquirres, Matina, Limón, and Talamanca. Each cantón has several local districts.

Limón is one of the most culturally diverse of Costa Rica's provinces, housing a significant Afro–Costa Ricans and indigenous population. Several languages (Spanish, Limón Creole) are spoken, and due mainly to its cultural ties to the Caribbean islands, dishes like rice and beans are ubiquitous throughout the province, along with reggae, calypso, and soca music (see "Demographics").

The capital is Puerto Limón, and other important cities include Siquirres, Puerto Viejo de Talamanca, and Guápiles.

Locals refer to themselves as limonenses.

== History ==
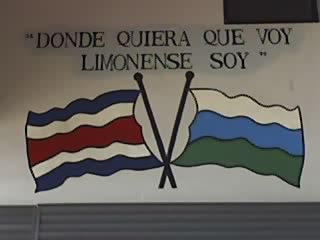
Translation: "Wherever I go, Limonense I am"

Columbus was the first European to visit Limón during his fourth and final voyage to the Americas in 1502, setting anchor near Isla Uvita, just off the shore of present-day Puerto Limón. Due mainly to the region's hot and inhospitable weather and fervent resistance from indigenous groups, the Spanish tried but eventually gave up the idea of colonizing the Caribbean lowlands and instead opted to exploit the central valley and Pacific regions.

Starting in the early 19th century, Afro-Caribbeans from Bocas del Toro (Panama), San Andrés (Colombia), and Nicaragua visited what is now Tortuguero to hunt turtles from May through September. As years passed, these populations eventually settled along the coast and founded the towns of Cahuita (named after the sangrillo or cawa tree), Old Harbour (Puerto Viejo), Grape Point (Punta Uva), and Manzanillo (named after the manchineel tree). The Afro-Caribbean population established an amicable trading relationship with the region's indigenous populations, and this cohesive existence laid the foundation for these two groups to eventually become the most populous in the province.

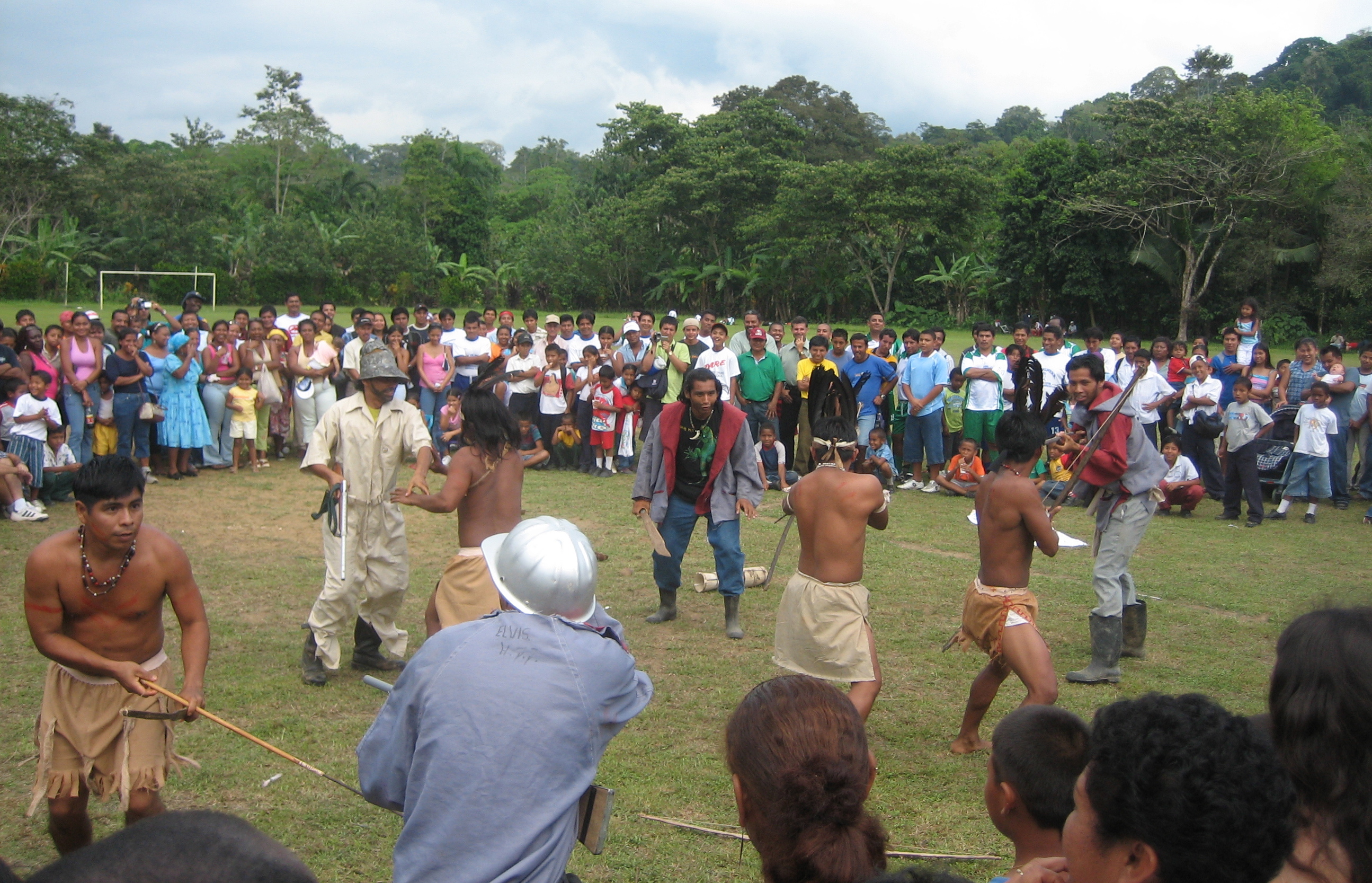
Re-enactment of indigenous resistance to the Spanish during the "Día del Indígena," which takes place in late April

Limón became accessible to large-scale economic activity and settlement after the government decided to build a railroad from San José to present-day Puerto Limón (or, as the locals call it, Limón). Tomás Guardia Gutiérrez proposed the project in 1870, shortly after his successful coup, as a more efficient means to ship to Europe. Although he secured two English bank loans in 1871 and got the American Henry Meiggs to take on the project, work stopped in 1873 due to financial, logistical, and labor issues. The railroad sat unfinished until the presidency of Próspero Fernández. In 1884, thanks to the effort of the Minister of Public Works, Bernardo Soto, Costa Rica hired Meiggs' nephew, Minor Keith, to renegotiate Costa Rica's debt and complete the project.

Native Costa-Ricans comprised the bulk of the labor force as the railroad began construction, though small proportions of Afro-Caribbeans and Chinese were also hired. When the project entered the Caribbean lowlands, however, many workers died from exhaustion and malaria, which prompted Keith to aggressively recruit outside the country, bringing in large numbers of Jamaicans, Chinese, and even Italians to finish the job. Seeking to minimize fixed costs, Keith planted banana crops along the lines as a cheap source of food for his work force. After finishing the project, but losing money due to low passenger numbers, Keith placed bananas in the empty cars and shipped them to the United States as a (subsequently successful) business experiment.This railroad was built as an export railroad, not a passenger railroad. Combined with the 800,000 acres (3,200 km^{2}) of Caribbean land the Costa Rican government gave him and the success of the banana sales, Keith eventually founded and grew the enormously lucrative United Fruit Company.

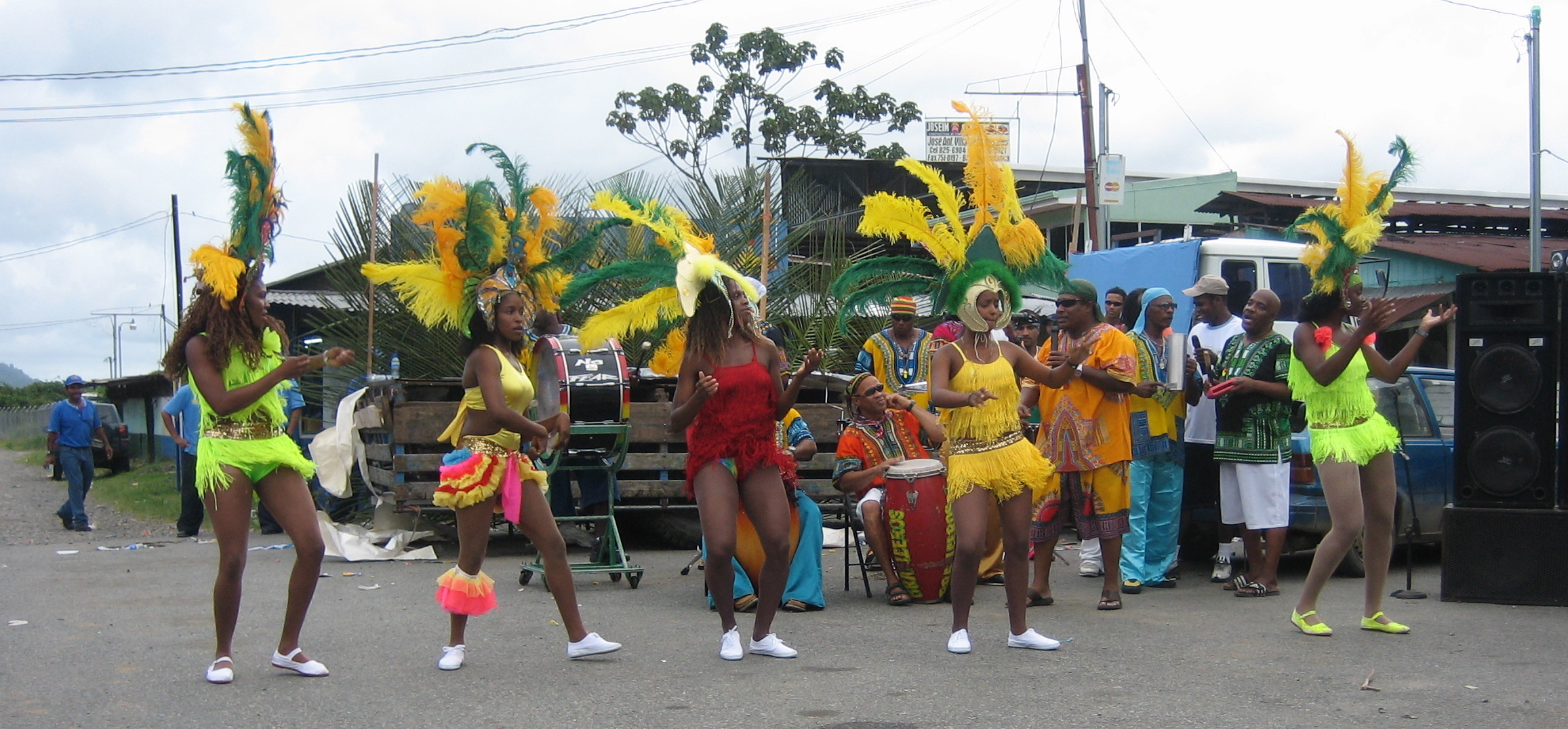
Calypso dancers from Puerto Limón performing in Bribrí, Talamanca

Several town names in Limón (mainly in Talamanca) trace their origin to Keith and his associates: Penhurst (just above Cahuita, and actually marked as Penshurt in street signs and local maps), Fields, Olivia, and Margarita (all three lying east of Bribrí, off of route 32).

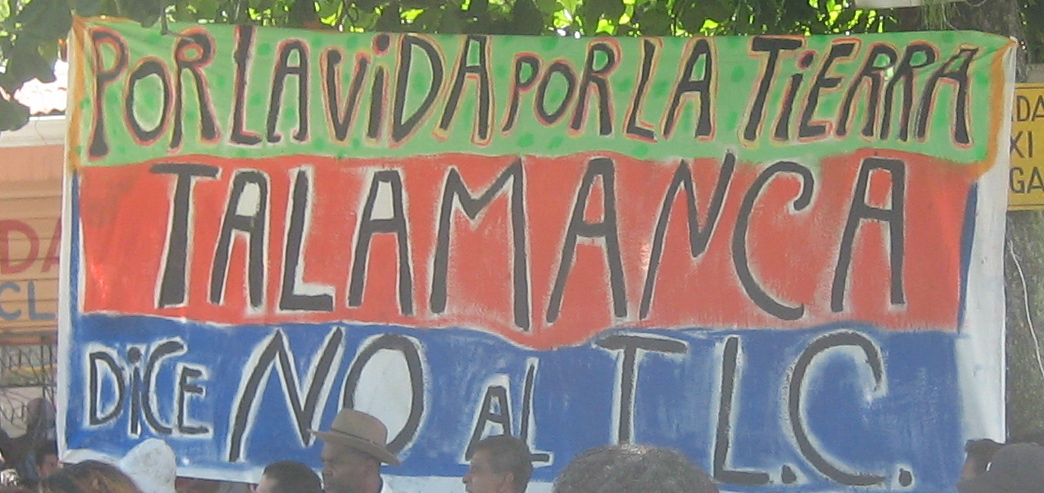
Demonstration against CAFTA-DR in Bribrí town

Ever since major development occurred in Limón, an undercurrent of political resentment has been felt between limonenses and the central government. This is especially true for the Afro-Caribbean population, who, until 1948, had to obtain legal permission to leave Limón province, and were not recognized as citizens. Roads and electricity were slow to come to most of the province (the latter did not arrive to Cahuita until late 1976), and the traditional disparity of resources – along with racism – created resentment among some of the Limón population. Recent major investment initiatives are a break with the past, and may help to improve relations between the Caribbean district and the central valley (see "Economy").

== Geography ==
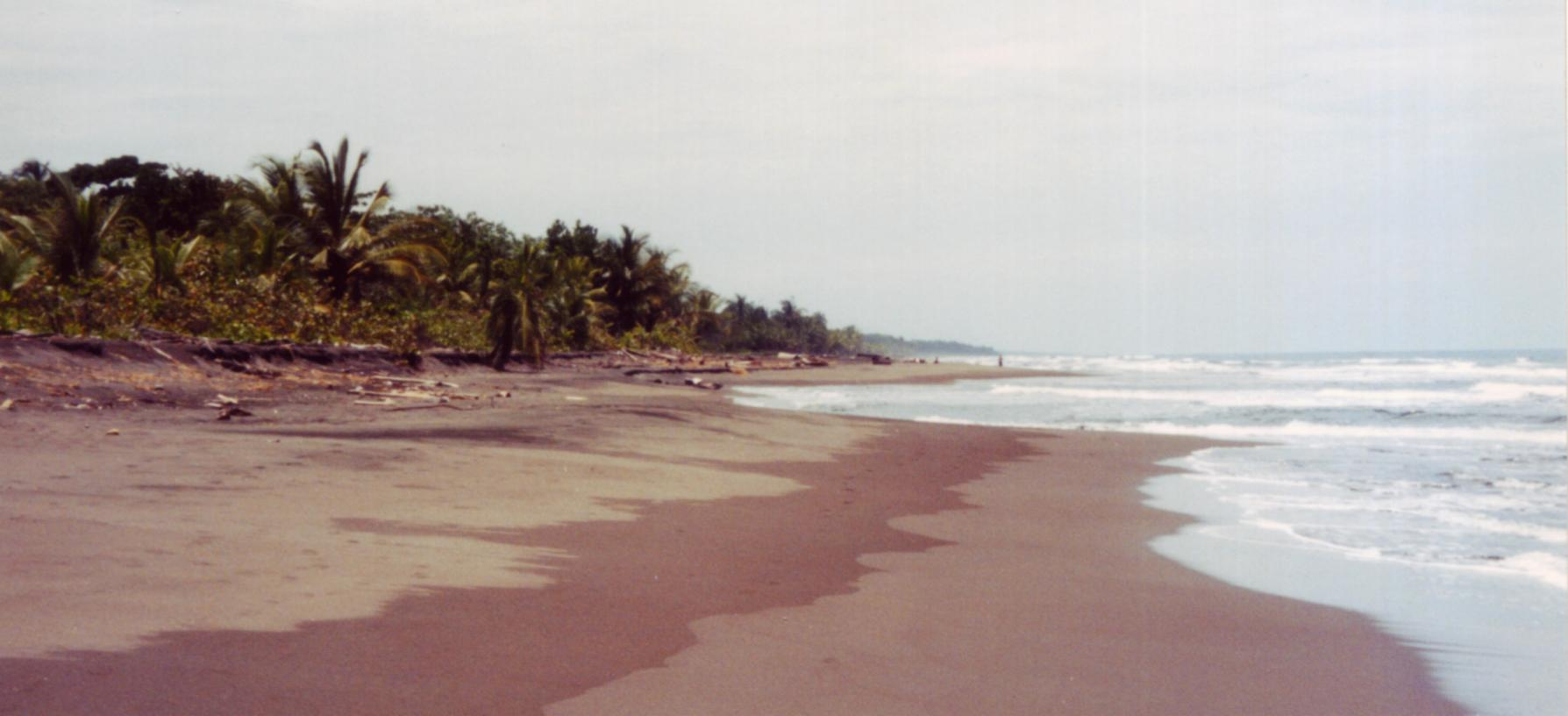
Caribbean coast in Limón

The majority of Limón's land lies at sea level, though its western border sees an increase in altitude due largely to the Cordillera de Talamanca. The province's indigenous populations largely reside in reserves that occupy much of the cantón of Talamanca.

== Climate ==
Unlike the rest of the country, Limón does not adhere to the dry-wet season cycle. It rains throughout the year, though the driest months tend to occur in September and October.

Climate data for Limón International Airport, Costa Rica
| Month | Jan | Feb | Mar | Apr | May | Jun | Jul | Aug | Sep | Oct | Nov | Dec | Year |
|---|---|---|---|---|---|---|---|---|---|---|---|---|---|
| Mean daily maximum °C (°F) | 27 (80) | 27 (80) | 28 (82) | 28 (83) | 28 (83) | 28 (83) | 28 (82) | 28 (82) | 29 (84) | 28 (83) | 27 (81) | 27 (80) | 27.7 (81.9) |
| Mean daily minimum °C (°F) | 22 (71) | 22 (71) | 22 (72) | 23 (73) | 24 (75) | 24 (75) | 23 (74) | 23 (74) | 24 (75) | 24 (75) | 23 (73) | 22 (72) | 22.9 (73.3) |
| Average precipitation mm (inches) | 319 (12.56) | 201 (7.90) | 193 (7.61) | 287 (11.30) | 281 (11.08) | 276 (10.87) | 408 (16.06) | 289 (11.37) | 163 (6.42) | 198 (7.80) | 367 (14.45) | 402 (15.81) | 3,384 (133.23) |
Source: Weather Underground

== Demographics ==
Limón is home to the country's largest concentration of Chinese, Afro-Caribbean and indigenous groups (mainly the Bribri, Kéköldi, and Cabécar). According to the 2000 census, 16% of Limón's population is Afro-Caribbean, 7% is indigenous, less than 1% is Chinese, and nearly 75% consider themselves a mix of Afro-Caribbean, indigenous, Chinese, and/or mestizo blood. Spoken languages include Spanish, an English creole called Limonese Creole, Chinese, English, and the indigenous languages of the province's three main groups (the Bribri, KéköLdi, and Babécar).

Due mainly to the surge in tourism starting around the 1970s, Limón is home to a host of foreign expatriates. Among the most common are Americans, Canadians, Nicaraguans, South Americans (mainly Colombian and Ecuadorian), and Europeans (Spanish, Dutch, German, Swiss, and Italian).

== Economy, education, health ==
The United Fruit Company laid the foundation of what keeps the limonense economy going. Although the fruit conglomerate has long been dismantled, banana and plantain exports remain one of the region's top sources of income, as well as the ports of Limón and Moín (administered by the government's Junta de Administración Portuaria y de Desarrollo Económico de la Vertiente Atlántica [Japdeva]), and tourism.

Although Limón province ranks third in overall poverty statistics, Talamanca ranks as one of the poorest counties in the country, with a significant portion of its mainly indigenous population of nearly 26,000 residents having spotty access to potable water, electricity, and roads. Two major tourist sites – Cahuita and Puerto Viejo/Manzanillo – exist in Talamanca, and taxes collected from and investment due to tourism help keep the municipality afloat. However, local leaders hope to benefit from the government's recent major investment initiatives in the province.

Access to education – especially in Talamanca – is a problem that the government has tried to tackle. Whereas about 45% of limonenses possess a high-school degree (about the national average), only about 22% of talamanqueños (those from Talamanca) have achieved the same qualification. Recognizing the tie between education and poverty, the government recently launched the avancemos education initiative, in which poor and at-risk high-school students are eligible for a national scholarship to help pay for school and therefore reduce the chances of dropping out. As of 2009, about 150,000 students receive a stipend (about 47% of the total public-high-school population). Though not officially linked, the government has reported lower drop-out rates over the past few years.

Health care is provided for the province by Hospital Dr. Tony Facio Castro.

== Cultural events ==
Every second week of October (except 2020), Puerto Limón hosts a festival called carnaval. The event's start's credited to local community leader and activist, Alfred Josiah Henry Smith (known as "Mister King"), who helped organize the first carnaval in October 1949. The event coincides with Columbus Day (known locally as Día de la Raza) on October 12, and traditionally lasts for a little over a week (to include two weekends). Activities include parades, food, music, dancing, and, on the last night, a concert headed by a major Latino/Caribbean music act in the Parque Vargas. Previous headliners have included Eddy Herrera (2002), Damian Marley (2003), El Gran Combo de Puerto Rico (2005), and T.O.K. (2006).

The festival goes on rain or shine, though at times it is susceptible to local emergencies: Event planners cancelled carnaval in 2007 due to a major dengue outbreak that afflicted all of Limón, and again in 2008 due to an epidemic trash-removal problem that has since been resolved.

On August 31, Día del Negro ("day of the black person") is held to showcase the black people in Limón. Everyone wears African garments, and the children and adults play music and dance in the middle of the street to traditional music.

== Political divisions ==
| # | Cantón | Area (km^{2}) | Population (2011) | Capital city |
|---|---|---|---|---|
| 1 | Limón | 1,765.79 | 94,415 | Limón |
| 2 | Pococí | 2,403.49 | 125,962 | Guápiles |
| 3 | Siquirres | 860.19 | 56,786 | Siquirres |
| 4 | Talamanca | 2,809.93 | 30,712 | Bribri |
| 5 | Matina | 772.64 | 37,721 | Matina |
| 6 | Guácimo | 576.48 | 41,266 | Guácimo |

== See also ==
- Jaguar Rescue Center, in Puerto Viejo de Talamanca
