= Taringa robledales =

Scientific classification
- Domain: Eukaryota
- Kingdom: Animalia
- Phylum: Mollusca
- Class: Gastropoda
- Order: Nudibranchia
- Family: Discodorididae
- Genus: Taringa
- Species: T. robledales

Binomial name
- Taringa robledales Moro & Ortea, 2015

Species of gastropod

Taringa robledales is a species of sea slug, a dorid nudibranch, shell-less marine opisthobranch gastropod mollusc in the family Discodorididae.

== Distribution ==
This species was described from Manzanillo, Limon, Costa Rica. The specimens were found on a violet sponge at 19 m depth. It was originally wrongly identified as Taringa tritorquis Ortea, Perez y Llera, 1982.

== Description ==
Taringa robledales is a dorid nudibranch, growing to at least 22 mm in length. It is reddish-purplish (wine-colored) in colour, almost uniform, except for tiny white spots which are only seen with a magnifying glass; there are also white granules on the edge of the mantle. The ventral aspect of the mantle is violet, on a pink background, darker towards the edge and more diffused towards the foot with some violet specks. The foot is narrower than the mantle and somewhat longer, protruding from behind when crawling; its anterior border is furrowed, with the upper lip cleft. The head has conical tentacles, white and solid. The black digestive gland is seen by transparency in the center of the sole of the foot and of the flanks. The whole surface of the mantle is upholstered with tubercles of caryophyllidia of equal form and shape, arranged tightly and with a bundle of spicules that barely protrudes from the tubercle.
