= Nanuca cahuitaensis =

Scientific classification
- Kingdom: Animalia
- Phylum: Mollusca
- Class: Gastropoda
- Order: Nudibranchia
- Suborder: Aeolidacea
- Family: Myrrhinidae
- Genus: Nanuca
- Species: N. cahuitaensis

Binomial name
- Nanuca cahuitaensis Henryco, Meirelles, García-Méndez, Camacho-García, Valdés, Schrödl & Padula, 2025

Species of gastropod

Nanuca cahuitaensis is a species of sea slug, specifically an aeolid nudibranch. It is a marine gastropod mollusc in the family Myrrhinidae, and occurs in Costa Rica, Venezuela and Panama.

== Etymology ==
The specific name refers to the type locality of N. cahuitaensis, Cahuita National Park, a well-known biodiversity hotspot on the Caribbean coast of Costa Rica.

== Distribution ==
Nanuca cahuitaensis has been recorded from several sites in the western Atlantic, including Cahuita National Park in Costa Rica, the Bocas del Toro region of Panama, and coastal areas of Venezuela.
