= Walter Ferguson (singer-songwriter) =

Panamanian-born Costa Rica singer-songwriter (1919–2023)

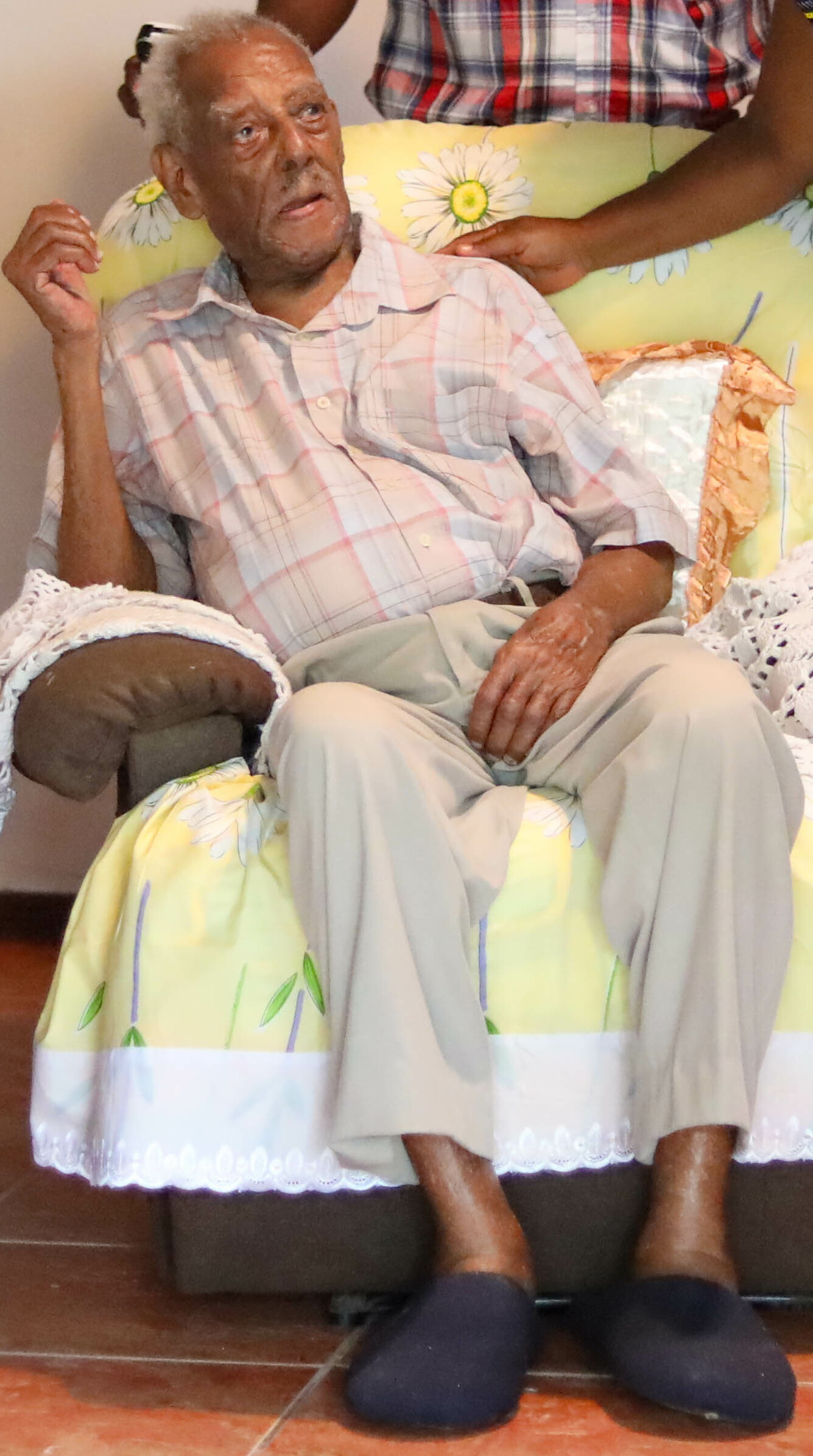

Background information
- Also known as: Mr. Gavitt, Segundo
- Born: Walter Ferguson Byfield; May 7, 1919; Guabito, Panama
- Died: February 25, 2023 (aged 103) Cahuita, Limón Province, Costa Rica
- Genres: Calypso
- Occupation: singer-songwriter
- Instruments: Clarinet, guitar, voice

Walter Ferguson Byfield (7 May 1919 – 25 February 2023) was a Panamanian-born Costa Rican calypso singer-songwriter. He was popularly known as Mr. Gavitt or Segundo, in his hometown of Cahuita.

== Biography ==
Walter Ferguson was born in Guabito, Panama on 7 May 1919, the oldest of six children. His father, Melsha Lorenzo Ferguson, was a Jamaican farmer for the United Fruit Company, and his mother, Sarah Byfield Dykin, a Costa Rican seamstress and baker of Jamaican descent. When Walter was two, his parents moved from Panama to the small fishing village of Cahuita in the Costa Rican province of Limón, where he ended up spending the rest of his life, almost never leaving it.

A precocious musical talent, Ferguson showed an interest in singing and music from a young age:

“I had a clear vocation for music from a very tender age. No one ever taught me anything. My mum told me that when I wasn’t even six, every time I heard someone else singing, I would sing too. […] Maybe I couldn't get all the lyrics right, but the intonation was good. She used to tell me that I would become a great musician, and that I would have never needed to work the land."

When he was seven, his mother sent him to the Caribbean port city of Limón to live with her sister Doris, who offered to help him learn to read, write and play music on her piano. His aunt's discipline and rules, however, didn't resonate well with young Walter, and he soon asked to go back to his beloved Cahuita.

Without any formal musical education, he taught himself to play the dulzaina, the harmonica, the ukulele, the guitar and the clarinet, his favourite instrument. Inspired by older calypsonians such as Mighty Sparrow and Papa Houdini, he started writing his own songs and attending all the calypso challenges around the Caribbean coast.

Although he was mostly seen performing solo, accompanying himself on his old Martin guitar, Mr Gavitt also performed as part of groups. He formed his first calypso band in his thirties, with which he performed at local festivals and events, sometimes for a few colones, some others just for the joy of "bringing some happiness", as he recounts in an interview, especially at the weddings of less affluent couples.

In his forties, he formed a second band, "Los Miserables" which became quite known locally for its varied Caribbean repertoire that included genres like guaracha, rumba and bolero. The group split upon a trivial fight among two of its members that led Ferguson to quit the band in sign of protest against their behaviour and promise to never play the clarinet again, a vow he kept for the rest of his life.

Despite playing a huge part in his life, music has never been the main source of income for Mr Gavitt. Contrary to his mother's predictions, he worked as a farmer throughout his life to support himself and the large family he had with his wife Julia Drummond, a childhood friend and neighbour, who died in 2016 at the age of 87. Together they had ten children and eight grandchildren.

Ferguson turned 100 in May 2019, and died on 25 February 2023, at the age of 103.

== Career ==
Ferguson's musical career spans over seven decades, and his work is considered to be an outstanding example of Afro-Caribbean culture.

After composing his first calypso "A sailing boat" in his twenties during WWII, he went on to write an estimated two hundred throughout songs in his life, including "Cabin in the Wata", "Callaloo" and "Carnaval Day".

His life as a farmer, his devotion to God, the daily life, problems and joys of the little towns along Costa Rica's Southeastern shoreline are all central themes in his compositions, written with his signature combination of humour and tragedy in the local creole English:

"My mother tongue is English but Spanish is the official language of Costa Rica and it's taught in all public schools. This is why everyone in Cahuita is perfectly bilingual, but we use English as our every day language. […] I sang in Spanish a few times, but they were either Boleros and Guarachas, or if they were calypsos, they were literal translations of the original English version. I never composed in Spanish."

The simplicity and power of Ferguson's interpretations were such that they gained him the admiration of the folk musicians of the Central Valley and prompted a new wave of calypso among the urban musicians of Limón. His influence on other Costa Rican musicians, such as Manuel Monestel of the Cantoamérica band, and Danny Williams of the band Kawe Calypso, both of whom recorded covers of his songs, has helped keep calypso alive in the country. Ferguson has always referred to Williams in particular as his successor.

=== Cassette recordings ===
Walter Ferguson self-recorded his music on individual tape cassettes over the years.

In the late 70s, after receiving a cassette recorder from one of his sons, he started recording himself on tapes that he would then sell to travellers and music lovers from all around the globe for some extra cash.

The technical limitations encouraged him to come up with ingenious solutions, such as the lo-fi overdubs he described in an interview: "I have two cassettes, I sing on one and when I'm done I copy it back and put another one in the recorded, so when I sing behind that, you hear two voices." He kept producing his home-recorded tapes from the late 1970s to the end of the 1990s, when he decided to retire from his music career and only perform occasionally.

Ferguson never wrote down the lyrics nor the music of his songs nor he ever made any copies of his cassettes, so each tape was a unique, original recording session.

In an attempt to recover this lost treasure, in January 2018 his son Peck Ferguson and Niels Werdenberg launched “The Walter Ferguson Tape Hunt”, a worldwide project aimed at rescuing all of Mr Gavitt's forgotten songs, in preparation for his 100th birthday celebrations in May 2019.

=== Vinyl records ===
Already a local legend, in 1982 Ferguson had the opportunity to record his first vinyl “Mr Gavitt: Costa Rican calypso”, a collection of some of his most famous songs produced by the American musicologist Michael Williams under the Smithsonian Folkways Recordings label. The album also included an English translation of the lyrics and a short biography. However, due to its poor sound quality, the album never found distribution in Costa Rica.

In 1986, the label Indica produced his second vinyl called "Calypsos del Caribe de Costa Rica" (Calypsos from the Caribbean Costa Rica) which included different songs, as well as some lyrics in English and a short biography of Ferguson written by the local historian Paula Palmer.

=== Compact discs ===
It wasn't until 2002, with the help of the label Papaya Music, that Ferguson could record his first high-quality CD.

The first issue that the producers of Papaya had to face was that Mr Gavitt, then 83, refused to travel to the capital city of San José to record, so they had to take the recording studio to Cahuita instead, and specifically to his family-owned hotel "Sol y Mar", at the entrance of the Cahuita National Park. They used mattresses and rugs to soundproof one of the rooms, muffle the sounds of the local pet parrots, dogs, passing buses and trucks, and increase the temperature so that they could separate the tracks of his voice and his guitar.

At last, "Babylon" was released in 2003, and Ferguson's work was finally recognised and appreciated at a larger scale. The CD consists of thirteen original tunes with only Ferguson accompanying himself on his guitar. It became a national and international success not only for its witty lyrics, but also for the unique recording process it went through.

Though Ferguson had already achieved legendary status on the Caribbean coast of Costa Rica before "Babylon" and his second CD "Dr Bombodee" (2004), their publication rescued him from oblivion and gave him back his status of calypsonian.

In 2013, the annual Festival International de Calypso Walter Ferguson was established in his honour in Cahuita.

In 2017, he was awarded the Patrimonio Cultural Inmaterial "Emilia Prieto Tugores" prize.

== Discography ==
=== Albums ===
- Mr. Gavitt – Calypso of Costa Rica (LP), 1982
- Calipsos Del Caribe De Costa Rica (LP, Album), 1986
- Calypsos – Afro-Limonese Music Of Costa Rica (CD, Comp, RE), 1991
- Babylon, 2003
- Dr. Bombodee, 2004
- Dr. Bombodee & Babylon (2xCD, Album, Ltd, RE), 2014

=== Singles and EPs ===
- King Of Calypso / Going To Bocas, 1982

=== Compilations ===
- King Of Calypso Limonense (The Legendary Tape Recordings, Vol. 1), 1982
