= Aporodoris =

Scientific classification
- Kingdom: Animalia
- Phylum: Mollusca
- Class: Gastropoda
- Order: Nudibranchia
- Family: Discodorididae
- Genus: Aporodoris; Ihering, 1886

Genus of gastropods

Aporodoris is a genus of sea slugs, dorid nudibranch, shell-less marine gastropod molluscs in the family Discorididae.

== Taxonomic status ==
Valdés & Gosliner (2001 synonymised Aporodoris with Taringa, invoking ICZN Art. 23.9 to designate Aporodoris a nomen oblitum and Taringa Er. Marcus, 1955 a nomen protectum.

Dayrat, 2010 made the following argument for reinstatement of Aporodoris:

SUPRA-SPECIFIC RELATIONSHIPS. Here, two questions are discussed: 1) the generic affinities proposed for millegrana, and 2) the valid name of the clade it belongs to, knowing that millegrana is the type species of the genus name Aporodoris von lhering 1886, by original designation. Bergh (1878a) re-allocated millegrana to Archidoris and then (Bergh 1894) to Thordisa with no explanation. Von lhering (1886) created a new generic name for millegrana, Aporodoris. The genus name Aporodoris was then used to describe several new species: Aporodoris rubra Bergh, 1905; Aporodoris risbeci Marcus and Marcus, 1967; and Aporodoris merria Burn, 1973. Thompson and Brown (1981) decided to re-allocate millegrana to Discodoris (Thompson classified all basal discodorids in Discodoris). Then, more recently, Valdes and Gosliner (2001) rightly argued that Aporodoris von lhering, 1886, and Taringa Marcus, 1955, are two synonyms, and that millegrana belongs to Taringa species (as shown in the present phylogenetic analysis).

The next question is: Which name should we use for that clade, Taringa or Aporodoris? The older name, Aporodoris, should have priority over the younger name, Taringa. Valdes and Gosliner (2001) argued that in this case, however, the ICZN Article 23.9 (not 23.9.2) applies and that the younger name should be regarded as valid. However, Article 23.9 actually does not apply here. According to Article 23.9, prevailing usage can be maintained only if two conditions are met (described in 23.9.1), one of which (23.9.1.1) is that the senior synonym must not have been used as a valid name after 1899. Although Valdes and Gosliner (2001) thought that Aporodoris had not been used as a valid name since 1899, three new species names were created in Aporodoris since 1899 (see above), and several authors used the binomial Aporodoris millegrana as valid (Eliot 1910b; Pruvot-Fol 1954a; Bouchet and Tardy 1976). Therefore Aporodoris is a valid name, regardless of whether Taringa has been widely used or not.

In addition, but not noted by Dayrat, the combination Aporodoris millegrana was treated as the valid combination for this species between 1910 (Eliot, 1910b) and 1981 (Thompson and Brown, 1981) in listings of the British molluscan fauna (Winckworth, 1932; White, 1937; Turk, 1973)

However, according to Article 23.10 of the International Code of Zoological Nomenclature (1999), this action stands and Taringa should be used as the valid name until such time as the Commission rules otherwise.

== Description ==
This genus is characterized by the presence of a membranaceous penial cuticle.

Taringa is placed in the family Discodorididae.

== Species ==
Species in the genus Aporodoris includes:

- Aporodoris merria Burn, 1973
- Aporodoris millegrana (Alder & Hancock, 1854)

Species brought into synonymy

- Apodoris fanabensis Ortea & Martinez, 1992 : synonym of Aporodoris millegrana (Alder & Hancock, 1854)
