= National Route 36 (Costa Rica) =

National Road Route in Costa Rica

National Primary Route 36
- Ruta nacional primaria 36

Route information
- Maintained by Ministry of Public Works and Transport
- Length: 92.800 km (57.663 mi)

Major junctions
- North end: Route 32
- Route 241; Route 234; Route 256; Route 801
- South end: Panama 1001

Location
- Country: Costa Rica
- Provinces: Limón

Highway system
- National Road Network of Costa Rica
← Route 35	→ Route 39

National Primary Route 36, or just Route 36 (Spanish: Ruta Nacional Primaria 36, or Ruta 36) is a National Road Route of Costa Rica, located in the Limón province.

== Description ==
In Limón province the route covers Limón canton (Limón, Valle La Estrella, and Matama districts), Talamanca canton (Bratsi, Sixaola, and Cahuita districts).

== History ==
=== Binational Sixaola River Bridge ===
The Binational Sixaola River Bridge, located at the southeast end of Route 36, is a bridge over the Sixaola River, the national border between Costa Rica and Panama.

The bridge is under construction as of October 2019 with a projected delivery date of March 2020 and being supervised by the United Nations Office for Project Services; it will span 260 meters, 16.4 meters wide, one lane in each way, with bicycle lanes and sidewalks. Migration checkpoints in both countries were moved to align with the new bridge, and the old railroad bridge was dismantled to construct the new road bridge.

== Junction list ==
The entire route is in Limón province.

Canton	District	km	mi	Destinations	Notes
Limón	Limón	0.00	0.00	Route 32	
Limón	Matama	10.55	6.56	Route 241	
Limón	Valle La Estrella	33.95	21.09	Route 234	
Talamanca	Cahuita	53.15	33.02	Route 256	
Talamanca	Bratsi	60.95	37.87	Route 801	
Talamanca	Sixaola	92.80	57.66	Panama 1001	Route ends in binational road bridge over Sixaola River
