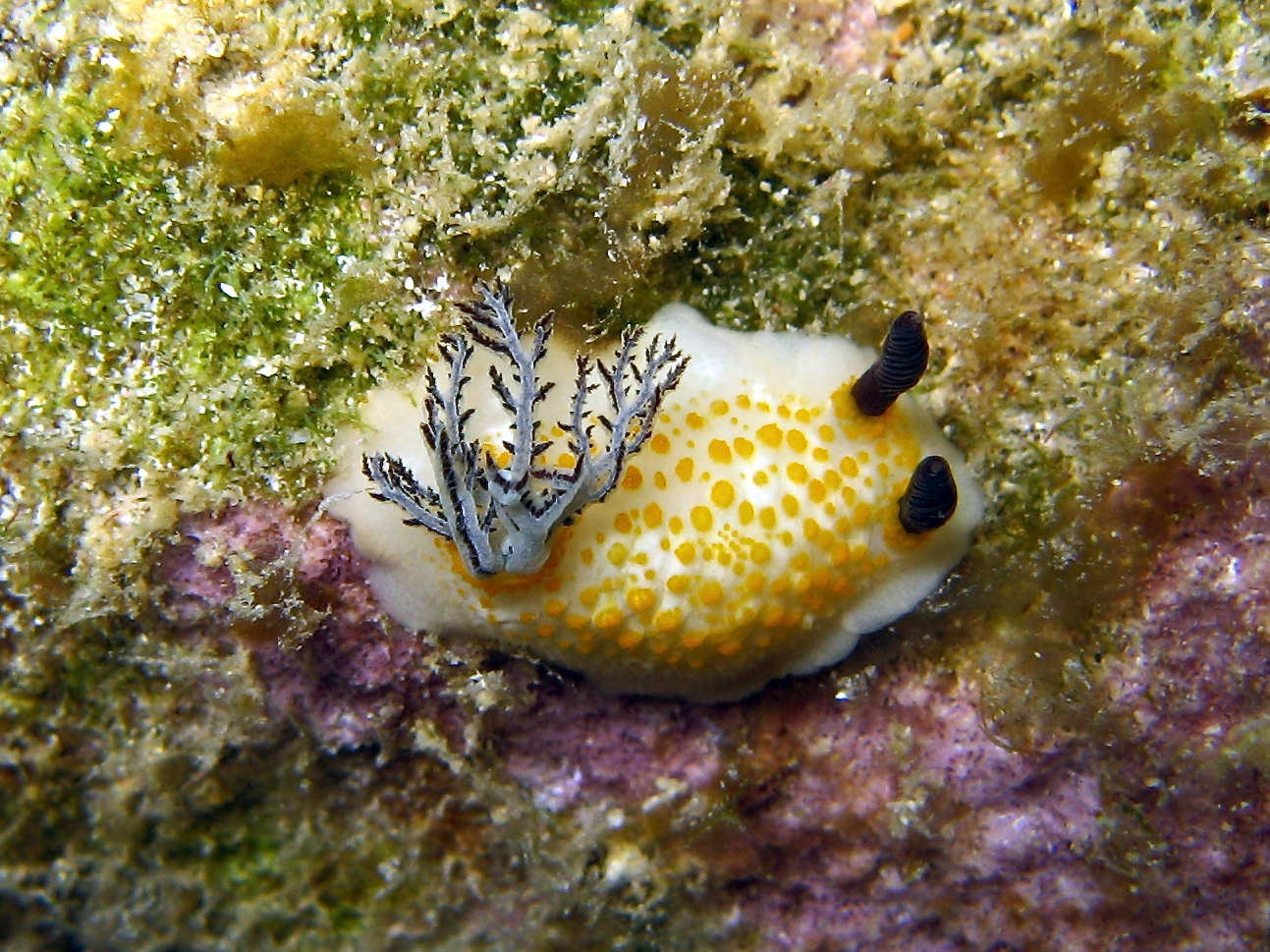
- Taringa halgerda from Puerto Galera in the Philippines

Scientific classification
- Kingdom: Animalia
- Phylum: Mollusca
- Class: Gastropoda
- Order: Nudibranchia
- Family: Discodorididae
- Genus: Taringa
- Species: T. halgerda

Binomial name
- Taringa halgerda Gosliner & Behrens, 1998

= Taringa halgerda =

Species of gastropod

Taringa halgerda is a species of sea slug, a dorid nudibranch, a shell-less marine gastropod mollusk in the family Discodorididae.

There is no real certainty that this species is placed in the correct genus.

== Distribution ==
This species was described from Balayan Bay, Batangas Province, Luzon, Philippines. It is found in the tropical Western Pacific Ocean, especially around Indonesia, Papua New Guinea and the Philippines.

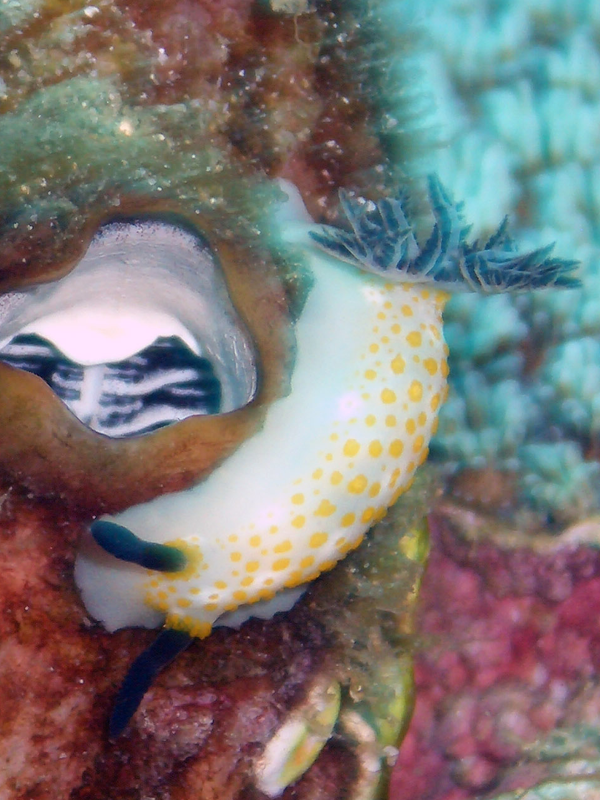
Taringa halgerda

== Description ==
Taringa halgerda is white with very distinct yellow tubercles covering the mantle. The gills of this nudibranch are white, faintly outlined in black, and the rhinophores are black. This species can reach a length of at least 40 mm.

This species can be confused with Taringa luteola but there are differences in the coloration, tubercles and in some aspects of the internal anatomy.
