= Río Blanco, Costa Rica =

District in Limón canton, Limón province, Costa Rica

Río Blanco
- District
- Río Blanco district
- Río Blanco district location in Costa Rica
- Coordinates: 9.9832415°N 83.1515625°W
- Country: Costa Rica
- Province: Limón
- Canton: Limón
- Creation: 10 August 1992

Area
  - Total: 131.29 km^{2} (50.69 sq mi)
- Elevation: 9 m (30 ft)

Population (2011)
  - Total: 8,307
  - Density: 63.27/km^{2} (163.9/sq mi)
- Time zone: UTC−06:00
- Postal code: 70103

Río Blanco is a district of the Limón canton, in the Limón province of Costa Rica.

== History ==
Río Blanco was created on 10 August 1992 by Decreto Ejecutivo 21515-G.

== Geography ==
Río Blanco has an area of 131.29 km^{2} (50.69 sq mi) and an elevation of 9 metres.

== Locations ==
- Poblados: Brisas, Brisas de Veragua, Búfalo, Limón 2000, Loma Linda, México, Milla 9, Miravalles, Río Blanco, Río Cedro, Río Madre, Río Quito, Río Victoria, Sandoval, Santa Rita, Victoria

== Demographics ==
Historical population
Census	Pop.	±% p.a.
2000	6,318	—
2011	8,307	+2.52%
2022	13,351	+4.41%
Source: Instituto Nacional de Estadística y Censos; Centro Centroamericano de Población

For the 2011 census, Río Blanco had a population of 8,307 inhabitants.

== Transportation ==
=== Road transportation ===
The district is covered by the following road routes:

- National Route 32
- National Route 240
- National Route 257
