= Taringa arcaica =

Scientific classification
- Domain: Eukaryota
- Kingdom: Animalia
- Phylum: Mollusca
- Class: Gastropoda
- Order: Nudibranchia
- Family: Discodorididae
- Genus: Taringa
- Species: T. arcaica

Binomial name
- Taringa arcaica Moro & Ortea, 2015

Species of gastropod

Taringa arcaica is a species of sea slug, a dorid nudibranch, shell-less marine opisthobranch gastropod molluscs in the family Discodorididae.

== Distribution ==
This species was described from the island of Sal, Cape Verde Islands. The specimens were found in the intertidal zone or up to 1 m depth.

== Description ==
Taringa arcaica is a dorid nudibranch, growing to at least 30 mm in length. It is translucent yellow in colour with spots of pale brown which have darker brown centres. The gills are pale brown flecked with dark brown.
