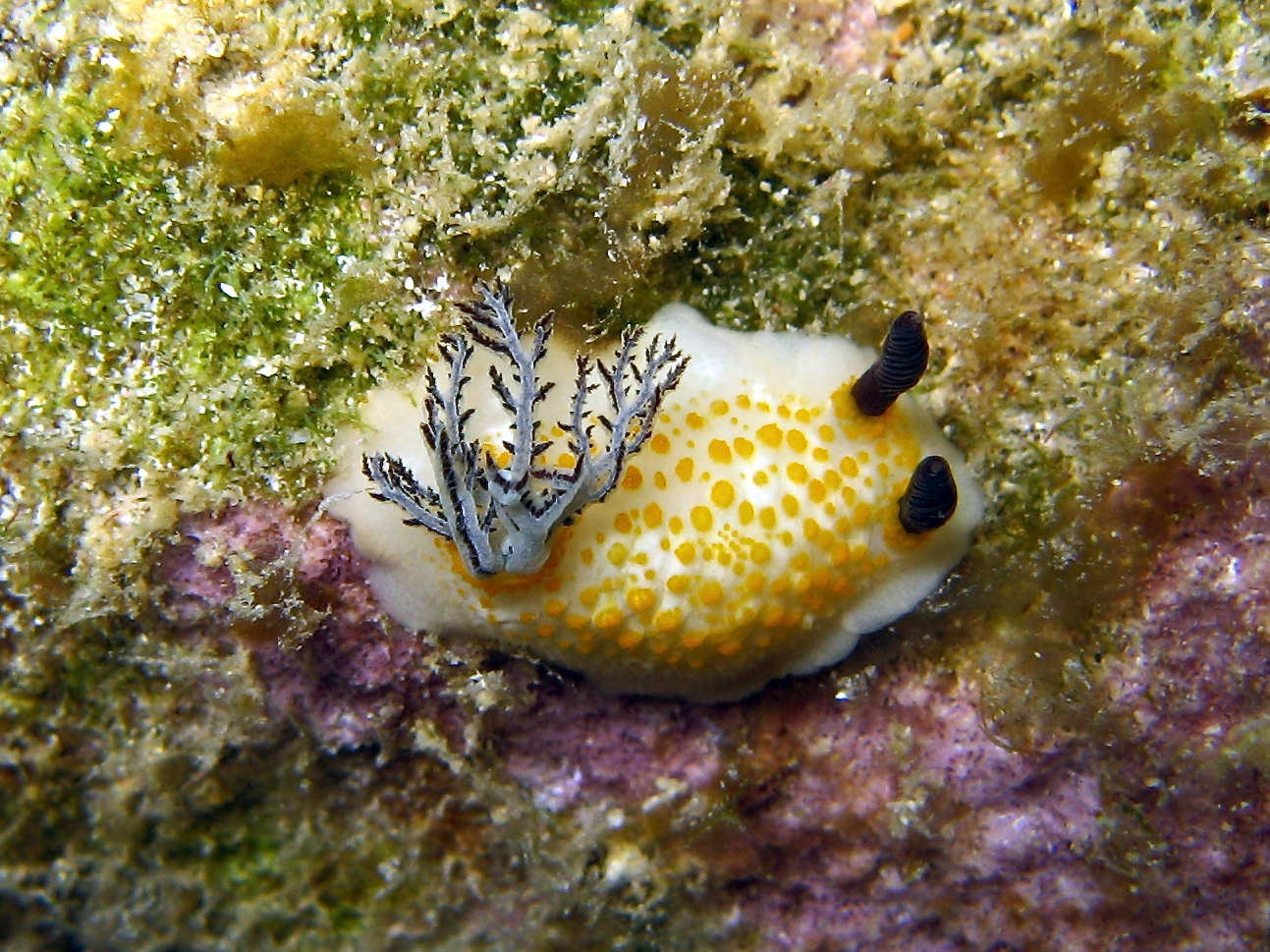
- A live individual of Taringa halgerda in situ

Scientific classification
- Kingdom: Animalia
- Phylum: Mollusca
- Class: Gastropoda
- Order: Nudibranchia
- Infraorder: Doridoidei
- Superfamily: Doridoidea
- Family: Discodorididae
- Genus: Taringa; Er. Marcus, 1955

= Taringa (gastropod) =

Genus of gastropods

Taringa is a genus of sea slugs, dorid nudibranchs, shell-less marine gastropod molluscs in the family Discodorididae.

== Species ==
Species in the genus Taringa include:

- Taringa aivica Marcus & Marcus, 1967
- Taringa arcaica Moro y Ortea, 2015
- Taringa armata Swennen, 1961
- Taringa ascitica Ortea, Perez & Llera, 1982
- Taringa bacalladoi Ortea, Perez & Llera, 1982
- Taringa faba Ballesteros, Llera & Ortea, 1985
- Taringa halgerda Gosliner & Behrens, 1998
- Taringa iemanja Alvim & Pimenta, 2013
- Taringa oleica Ortea, Perez & Llera, 1982
- Taringa pinoi Perrone, 1985
- Taringa robledales Ortea, Moro y Espinosa, 2015
- Taringa sublutea (Abraham, 1877)
- Taringa telopia Marcus, 1955 - type species of the genus Taringa
- Taringa tritorquis Ortea, Perez & Llera, 1982

Synonyms

- Taringa caudata (Farran, 1905): synonym of Taringa sublutea (Abraham, 1877)
- Taringa fanabensis Ortea & Martínez, 1992: synonym of Taringa millegrana (Alder & Hancock, 1854): synonym of Aporodoris millegrana (Alder & Hancock, 1854)
- Taringa luteola (Kelaart, 1858): synonym of Taringa sublutea (Abraham, 1877)
- Taringa millegrana (Alder & Hancock, 1854): synonym of Aporodoris millegrana (Alder & Hancock, 1854)
- Taringa tarifaensis García-Gómez, Cervera & García-Martin, 1993: synonym of Taringa millegrana (Alder & Hancock, 1854): synonym of Aporodoris millegrana (Alder & Hancock, 1854)

== Taxonomy ==
The genus Taringa was described by Ernst Gustav Gotthelf Marcus in 1955 with the type species Taringa telopia.

Valdés & Gosliner (2001) synonymized the genera Aporodoris Ihering, 1886 and Taringa Er. Marcus, 1955. They used Taringa as the valid name (declaring it to be a nomen protectum) because they (erroneously) considered the senior synonym Aporodoris not to have been used as a valid name since 1886.

Valdés & Gosliner (2001) carried out an erroneous reversal precedence. The International Commission on Zoological Nomenclature should publish a decision on which name should be used in such cases, according to Article 23.10 of the International Code of Zoological Nomenclature. In the meantime, the name in prevailing usage must be used (according to Article 23.10).

Dayrat (2010) agreed with the synonymization of the genera Aporodoris and Taringa. However, he considered the generic name Aporodoris and the specific name Aporodoris millegrana to be valid using strict application of the Principle of Priority.

List of works with the name Aporodoris used as valid:

- Ihering 1886
- Eliot 1910 - he provisionally used the genus Aporodoris
- Burn 1973
- Dayrat 2010

Genus Taringa was used as valid in at least 30 works. List of works with the name Taringa used as valid:

- Er. Marcus 1955
- Swennen 1961
- Marcus & Marcus, 1967
- Marcus E. 1976
- Behrens & Henderson 1982
- Ortea, Perez & Llera, 1982
- Ballesteros, Llera & Ortea, 1985
- Perrone 1985
- Perrone 1986
- Gosliner & Behrens 1998
- Ortea & Martínez 1992
- García-Gómez, Cervera & García-Martín 1993
- Valdés & Gosliner 2001
- Valdés 2002
- Camacho-García & Valdés 2003
- Dayrat 2005
- Dayrat & Gosliner 2005
- Johnson 2008 unpublished
- Camacho-García 2009
- Malaquias et al. 2009
- Johnson 2011

Overview of works with unclear use of the name Taringa and Aporodoris:

- Dayrat 2011
