= Valle La Estrella =

District in Limón canton, Limón province, Costa Rica

- District
- Valle La Estrella district
- Valle La Estrella district location in Costa Rica
- Coordinates: 9.6897261°N 83.2014154°W
- Country: Costa Rica
- Province: Limón
- Canton: Limón
- Creation: 10 August 1992

Area
  - Total: 1,238.66 km^{2} (478.25 sq mi)
- Elevation: 18 m (59 ft)

Population (2011)
  - Total: 17,908
  - Density: 14.458/km^{2} (37.445/sq mi)
- Time zone: UTC−06:00
- Postal code: 70102

Valle La Estrella is a district of the Limón canton, in the Limón province of Costa Rica.

== History ==
Valle La Estrella was created on 10 August 1992 by Decreto Ejecutivo 21515-G.

== Geography ==
Valle La Estrella has an area of 1,238.66 km^{2} and an elevation of 18 metres.

== Locations ==
- Barrios: Colonia, Finca Ocho, Guaria, Loras, Pandora Oeste, Río Ley
- Poblados: Alsacia, Armenia, Atalanta, Bananito Sur, Boca Cuen, Boca Río Estrella, Bocuare, Bonifacio, Brisas, Buenavista, Burrico, Calveri, Caño Negro, Cartagena, Casa Amarilla, Cerere, Concepción, Cuen, Chirripó Abajo (part), Durfuy (San Miguel), Duruy, Fortuna, Gavilán, Hueco, I Griega, Jabuy, Llano Grande, Manú, Miramar, Moi (San Vicente), Nanabre, Nubes, Penshurt, Pléyades, Porvenir, Progreso, Río Seco, San Andrés, San Carlos, San Clemente, San Rafael, Suruy, Talía, Tobruk, Tuba Creek (part), Valle de las Rosas, Vegas de Cerere, Vesta

== Demographics ==
Historical population
Census	Pop.	±% p.a.
2000	16,907	—
2011	17,908	+0.52%
2022	19,119	+0.60%
Source: Instituto Nacional de Estadística y Censos; Centro Centroamericano de Población

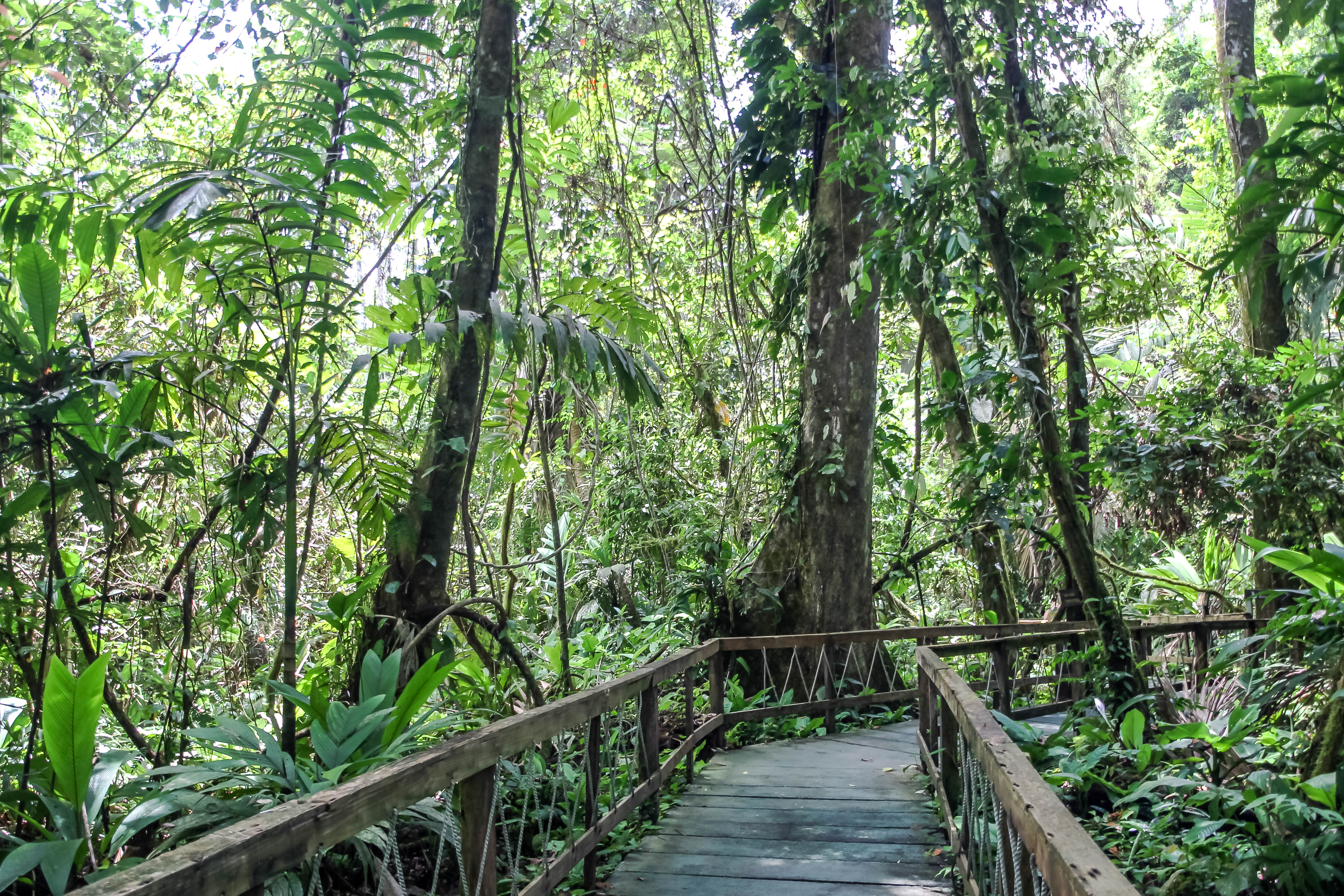
Valle La Estrella: Veragua Rainforest

For the 2011 census, Valle La Estrella had a population of 17,908 inhabitants.

== Transportation ==
=== Road transportation ===
The district is covered by the following road routes:

- National Route 36
- National Route 234
