= Taringa bacalladoi =

Scientific classification
- Domain: Eukaryota
- Kingdom: Animalia
- Phylum: Mollusca
- Class: Gastropoda
- Order: Nudibranchia
- Family: Discodorididae
- Genus: Taringa
- Species: T. bacalladoi

Binomial name
- Taringa bacalladoi Ortea, Perez & Llera, 1982

Species of gastropod

Taringa bacalladoi is a species of sea slug, a dorid nudibranch, shell-less marine opisthobranch gastropod mollusc in the family Discodorididae.
