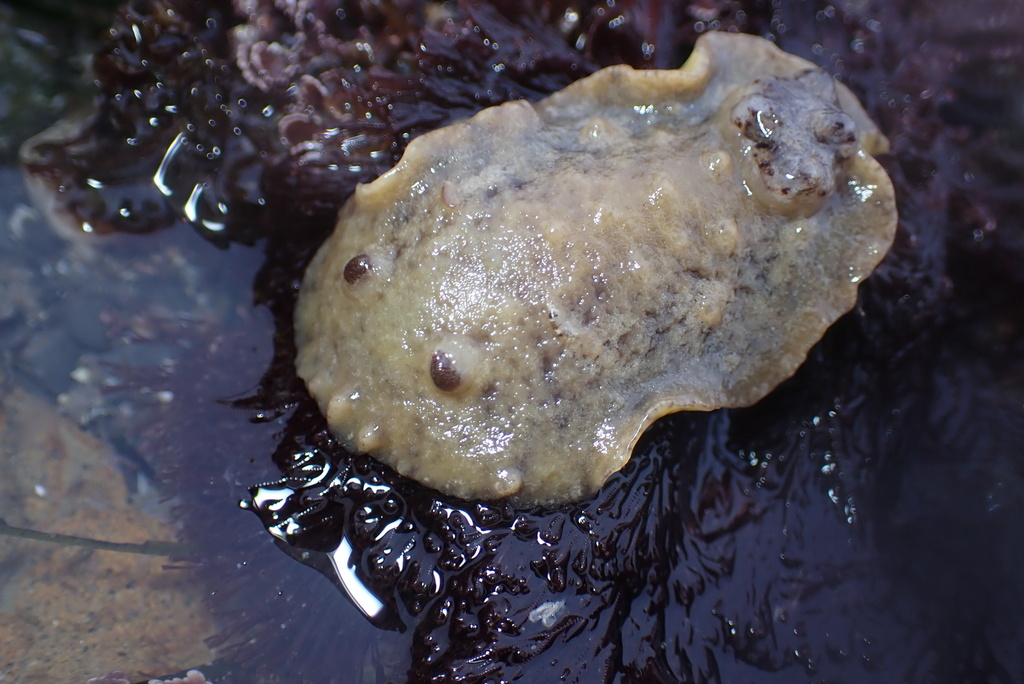

Scientific classification
- Kingdom: Animalia
- Phylum: Mollusca
- Class: Gastropoda
- Order: Nudibranchia
- Family: Discodorididae
- Genus: Taringa
- Species: T. aivica

Binomial name
- Taringa aivica Ev. Marcus & Er. Marcus, 1967

Synonyms
- Taringa aivica timia Marcus & Marcus, 1967

= Taringa aivica =

Species of gastropod

Taringa aivica is a species of sea slug, a dorid nudibranch, shell-less marine gastropod mollusc in the family Discodorididae.

== Distribution ==
This species was described from Fort Kobbe Beach, Panama, 8.8945°N 79.5811°W, Pacific Ocean. It has been reported from Bahía de Banderas, Mexico and from the Palos Verdes peninsula in Los Angeles County to Bahía Tortugas, Baja California and the Sonoran coast of the Gulf of California.
