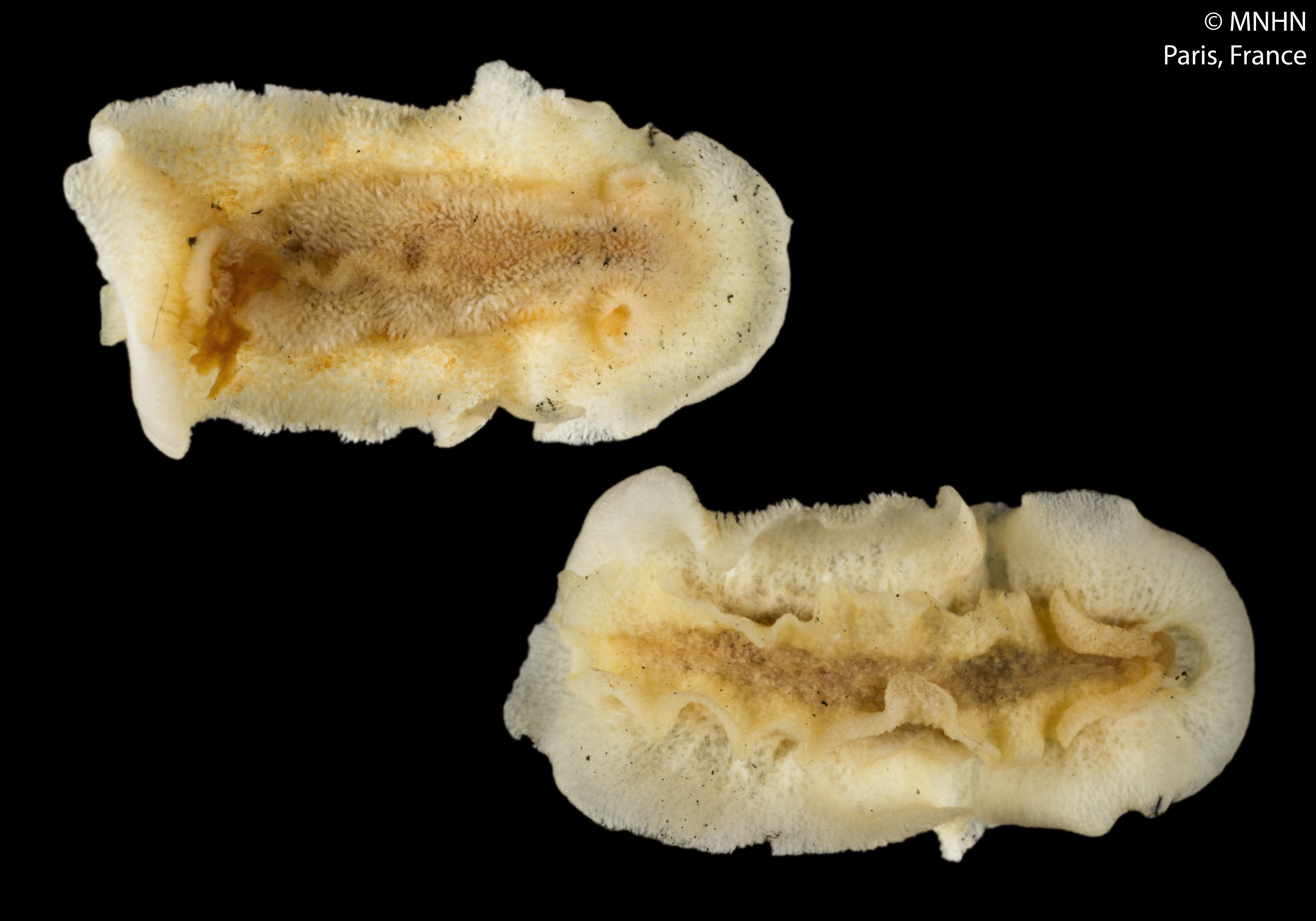
- Taringa oleica (holotype at MNHN, Paris)

Scientific classification
- Kingdom: Animalia
- Phylum: Mollusca
- Class: Gastropoda
- Order: Nudibranchia
- Family: Discodorididae
- Genus: Taringa
- Species: T. oleica

Binomial name
- Taringa oleica Ortea, Perez & Llera, 1982

= Taringa oleica =

Species of gastropod

Taringa oleica is a species of sea slug, a dorid nudibranch, a shell-less marine gastropod mollusc in the family Discodorididae.

== Distribution ==
This marine species occurs off the Canary Islands.
