= Matama =

District in Limón canton, Limón province, Costa Rica

- District
- Interactive map of Matama
- Matama district location in Costa Rica
- Coordinates: 9.8696656°N 83.1073186°W
- Country: Costa Rica
- Province: Limón
- Canton: Limón
- Creation: 10 August 1992

Area
  - Total: 339.13 km^{2} (130.94 sq mi)
- Elevation: 17 m (56 ft)

Population (2011)
  - Total: 7,128
  - Density: 21.02/km^{2} (54.44/sq mi)
- Time zone: UTC−06:00
- Postal code: 70104

Matama is a district of the Limón canton, in the Limón province of Costa Rica.

== History ==
Matama was created on 10 August 1992 by Decreto Ejecutivo 21515-G.

== Geography ==
Matama has an area of 339.13 km^{2} and an elevation of 17 metres.

== Locations ==
- Poblados: Aguas Zarcas, Asunción, Bananito Norte, Bearesem, Beverley, Calle Tranvía, Castillo Nuevo, Dondonia, Filadelfia Norte, Filadelfia Sur, Kent, María Luisa, Mountain Cow, Paraíso, Polonia, Quitaría, Río Banano, San Cecilio, Tigre, Trébol, Westfalia

== Demographics ==
Historical population
Census	Pop.	±% p.a.
1892	633	—
2000	6,410	+2.17%
2011	7,128	+0.97%
2022	12,473	+5.22%
Source: Instituto Nacional de Estadística y Censos; Centro Centroamericano de Población

For the 2011 census, Matama had a population of 7,128 inhabitants.

== Transportation ==
=== Road transportation ===
The district is covered by the following road routes:

- National Route 36
- National Route 241
- National Route 802
