= National Route 802 (Costa Rica) =

National Road Route in Costa Rica

National Tertiary Route 802
- Ruta nacional terciaria 802

Route information
- Maintained by Ministry of Public Works and Transport
- Length: 10.670 km (6.630 mi)

Major junctions
- East end: Route 241
- West end: Aguas Zarcas town.

Location
- Country: Costa Rica
- Provinces: Limón

Highway system
- National Road Network of Costa Rica
← Route 801	→ Route 803

National Tertiary Route 802, or just Route 802 (Spanish: Ruta Nacional Terciaria 802, or Ruta 802) is a National Road Route of Costa Rica, located in the Limón province.

== Description ==
In Limón province the route covers Limón canton (Matama district).

== Junction list ==
The entire route is in Matama district.

District	km	mi	Destinations	Notes
Matama	0.00	0.00	Route 241	
