= Limón (canton) =

Canton in Limón province, Costa Rica

- Canton
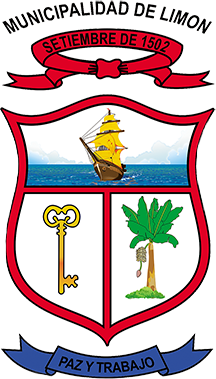
- Flag Seal
- Interactive map of Limón
- Limón canton location in Costa Rica
- Coordinates: 9.7750689°N 83.2014154°W
- Country: Costa Rica
- Province: Limón
- Creation: 25 July 1892
- Head city: Limón
- Districts: Districts: Limón; Valle La Estrella; Río Blanco; Matama

Government
  - Type: Municipality
  - Body: Municipalidad de Limón

Area
  - Total: 1,765.79 km^{2} (681.78 sq mi)
- Elevation: 12 m (39 ft)

Population (2011)
  - Total: 94,415
  - Density: 53.469/km^{2} (138.48/sq mi)
- Time zone: UTC−06:00
- Canton code: 701
- Website: www.municlimon.go.cr

Limón is a canton in the Limón province of Costa Rica. The head city is in Limón district.

== Toponymy ==
Limón is the word in Spanish for the lemon fruit.

== History ==
Limón was created as a canton on 25 July 1892 by decree 61.

A district of Limón was established in 1870 under the jurisdiction of the central government in San José.

== Geography ==
Limón has an area of 1,765.79 km^{2} (681.78 sq mi) and a mean elevation of 12 metres.

The canton lies along the Caribbean coast from the mouth of the Toro River in the north to Tuba Creek in the south. It ranges westward into the Cordillera de Tilarán, with a southwest finger of the canton reaching up to the peak of Cerro Chirripó, the highest point in Costa Rica.

== Districts ==
The canton of Limón is subdivided into the following districts:

1. Limón
2. Valle La Estrella
3. Río Blanco
4. Matama

== Demographics ==
Historical population
Census	Pop.	±% p.a.
1883	1,858	—
1892	7,484	+16.74%
1927	22,424	+3.18%
1950	23,337	+0.17%
1963	40,141	+4.26%
1973	40,830	+0.17%
1984	52,602	+2.33%
2000	89,933	+3.41%
2011	94,415	+0.44%
2022	116,457	+1.93%
Source: Instituto Nacional de Estadística y Censos; Centro Centroamericano de Población

For the 2011 census, Limón had a population of 94,415 inhabitants.

== Transportation ==
=== Road transportation ===
The canton is covered by the following road routes:

- National Route 32
- National Route 36
- National Route 234
- National Route 240
- National Route 241
- National Route 257
- National Route 802
