= Taringa faba =

Scientific classification
- Domain: Eukaryota
- Kingdom: Animalia
- Phylum: Mollusca
- Class: Gastropoda
- Order: Nudibranchia
- Family: Discodorididae
- Genus: Taringa
- Species: T. faba

Binomial name
- Taringa faba Ballesteros, Llera & Ortea, 1985

Species of gastropod

Taringa faba is a species of sea slug, a dorid nudibranch, a shell-less marine opisthobranch gastropod mollusc in the family Discodorididae.
