= National Route 241 (Costa Rica) =

National Road Route in Costa Rica

National Secondary Route 241
- Ruta nacional secundaria 241

Route information
- Maintained by Ministry of Public Works and Transport
- Length: 12.355 km (7.677 mi)

Major junctions
- North end: Route 32
- Route 802
- South end: Route 36

Location
- Country: Costa Rica
- Provinces: Limón

Highway system
- National Road Network of Costa Rica
← Route 240	→ Route 242

National Secondary Route 241, or just Route 241 (Spanish: Ruta Nacional Secundaria 241, or Ruta 241) is a National Road Route of Costa Rica, located in the Limón province.

== Description ==
In Limón province the route covers Limón canton (Limón and Matama districts).

== Junction list ==
The entire route is in Limón canton, of Limón province.

District	km	mi	Destinations	Notes
Limón	0.00	0.00	Route 32	
Matama	9.595	5.96	Route 802	
Matama	12.355	7.67	Route 36	
