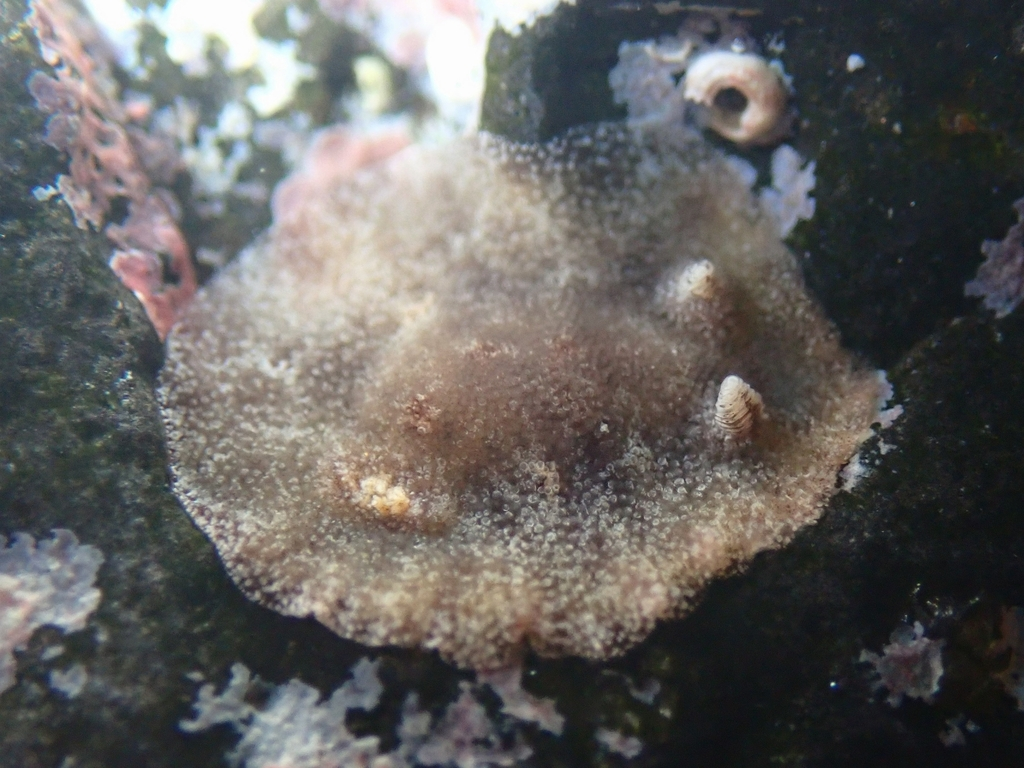

Scientific classification
- Kingdom: Animalia
- Phylum: Mollusca
- Class: Gastropoda
- Order: Nudibranchia
- Family: Discodorididae
- Genus: Taringa
- Species: T. armata

Binomial name
- Taringa armata Swennen, 1961

= Taringa armata =

Species of gastropod

Taringa armata is a species of sea slug, a dorid nudibranch, shell-less marine opisthobranch gastropod mollusks in the family Discodorididae.

== Distribution ==
This species was described from 4 km west of the harbour of Antalya, Turkey, 36.812195°N 30.587895°E. It is known from the Adriatic Sea, eastern Mediterranean Sea.
