= National Route 240 (Costa Rica) =

National Road Route in Costa Rica

National Secondary Route 240
- Ruta nacional secundaria 240

Route information
- Maintained by Ministry of Public Works and Transport
- Length: 10.500 km (6.524 mi)

Location
- Country: Costa Rica
- Provinces: Limón

Highway system
- National Road Network of Costa Rica
← Route 239	→ Route 241

National Secondary Route 240, or just Route 240 (Spanish: Ruta Nacional Secundaria 240, or Ruta 240) is a National Road Route of Costa Rica, located in the Limón province.

== Description ==
In Limón province the route covers Limón canton (Limón and Río Blanco districts).
