= Taringa tritorquis =

Scientific classification
- Domain: Eukaryota
- Kingdom: Animalia
- Phylum: Mollusca
- Class: Gastropoda
- Order: Nudibranchia
- Family: Discodorididae
- Genus: Taringa
- Species: T. tritorquis

Binomial name
- Taringa tritorquis Ortea, Perez & Llera, 1982

Species of gastropod

Taringa tritorquis is a species of sea slug, a dorid nudibranch, a shell-less marine gastropod mollusc in the family Discodorididae.
