= Cahuita =

District in Limón province, Costa Rica

- District
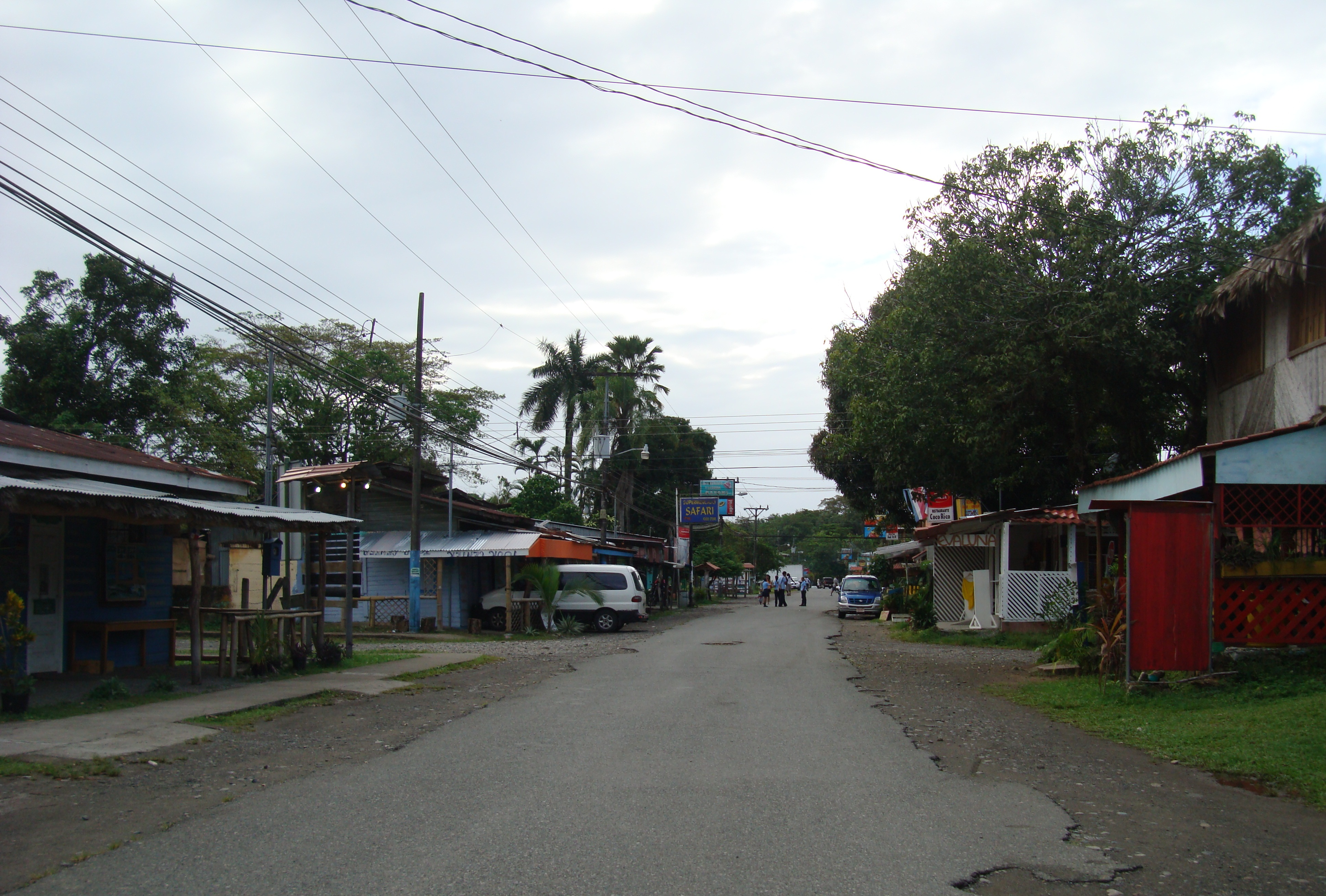
- Main street in Cahuita
- Interactive map of Cahuita
- Cahuita district location in Costa Rica
- Coordinates: 9.6797786°N 82.7722403°W
- Country: Costa Rica
- Province: Limón
- Canton: Talamanca
- Creation: 19 February 1970

Government
  - Type: Democratic
  - Syndic: Adenyl Guillermo Peralta Cruz (PLN)
  - Substitutle syndic: vacant

Area
  - Total: 234.6 km^{2} (90.6 sq mi)
- Elevation: 4 m (13 ft)

Population (2011)
  - Total: 8,293
  - Density: 35.35/km^{2} (91.55/sq mi)
- Time zone: UTC−06:00
- Postal code: 70403

Cahuita is a district of the Talamanca canton in the Limón province of Costa Rica. It is located on the Caribbean coast.

== History ==
Cahuita was created on 19 February 1970 by Decreto Ejecutivo 13.

== Geography ==
Cahuita has an area of 234.6 km^{2} and an elevation of 4 metres.

== Locations ==
- Poblados: Buenavista (Katuir), Bordón, Carbón, Carbón 1, Carbón 2, Catarata, Cocles, Comadre, Dindirí, Gibraltar, Hone Creek, Hotel Creek, Kekoldi, Limonal, Manzanillo, Mile Creek, Patiño, Playa Chiquita, Puerto Viejo, Punta Caliente, Punta Cocles, Punta Mona, Punta Uva, Tuba Creek (Parte).

=== Manzanillo ===
Manzanillo is a village located just outside the Jairo Mora Sandoval Gandoca-Manzanillo Mixed Wildlife Refuge, at the end of Route 256. Manzanillo is situated south of Puerto Limon in Limón Province on Costa Rica's Caribbean coast. The main attraction of this tiny town is its white sand beach lined with palm trees.

== Demographics ==
Historical population
Census	Pop.	±% p.a.
1973	1,545	—
1984	2,521	+4.55%
2000	5,331	+4.79%
2011	8,293	+4.10%
2022	13,463	+4.50%
Source: Instituto Nacional de Estadística y Censos; Centro Centroamericano de Población

For the 2011 census, Cahuita had a population of 8,293 inhabitants.

== Culture ==
Due to its proximity to the Caribbean shoreline, Cahuita is renowned for Afro-Caribbean influence on dining and local culture. The city is specifically known for its beaches, dessert crepes (often including local bananas, strawberries, and chocolate), and variations of grilled chicken.

The town was also home to Walter Ferguson (1919–2023), the "King of Calypso". His 100th birthday in 2019 was declared National Calypso Day by Costa Rica's vice president.

== Tourism ==
The Playa Negra (Black Beach) and Cahuita National Park are close to town. Limón is north of Cahuita. Puerto Viejo is the next town south.

The main access of Jairo Mora Sandoval Gandoca-Manzanillo Mixed Wildlife Refuge is located in this district, in the Manzanillo village.

== Transportation ==
=== Road transportation ===
The district is covered by the following road routes:

- National Route 36
- National Route 256

Cahuita is served by Route 36, which connects Puerto Limón to Sixaola. Many roads in Cahuita are composed of dirt, gravel, and stone, often making it necessary for foreign visitors to rent a 4WD vehicle to reach local beaches and hotels on the northern fringes of town.

== Climate ==
Cahuita has a tropical climate. Temperatures remain consistent during the year. Sunrise and sunset change very little during the year (about 6:00 AM and 6:00 PM, respectively). Limón International Airport is nearby and has similar average temperatures and precipitation.

Climate data for Limon International Airport, Costa Rica
Month	Jan	Feb	Mar	Apr	May	Jun	Jul	Aug	Sep	Oct	Nov	Dec	Year
Mean daily maximum °F (°C)	80 (27)	80 (27)	82 (28)	83 (28)	83 (28)	83 (28)	82 (28)	82 (28)	84 (29)	83 (28)	81 (27)	80 (27)	81.9 (27.7)
Mean daily minimum °F (°C)	71 (22)	71 (22)	72 (22)	73 (23)	75 (24)	75 (24)	74 (23)	74 (23)	75 (24)	75 (24)	73 (23)	72 (22)	73.3 (22.9)
Average precipitation inches (mm)	12.56 (319)	7.90 (201)	7.61 (193)	11.30 (287)	11.08 (281)	10.87 (276)	16.06 (408)	11.37 (289)	6.42 (163)	7.80 (198)	14.45 (367)	15.81 (402)	133.23 (3,384)
Source: Weather Underground
