= Aporodoris millegrana =

Scientific classification
- Kingdom: Animalia
- Phylum: Mollusca
- Class: Gastropoda
- Order: Nudibranchia
- Family: Discodorididae
- Genus: Aporodoris
- Species: A. millegrana

Binomial name
- Aporodoris millegrana (Alder & A. Hancock, 1854)

Synonyms
- Doris millegrana Alder & Hancock, 1854 (basionym); Discodoris millegrana (Alder & Hancock, 1854); Aporodoris millegrana (Alder & Hancock, 1854); Archidoris millegrana; Taringa fanabensis Ortea & Martínez, 1992; Taringa millegrana (Alder & Hancock, 1854); Taringa tarifaensis García-Goméz, Cervera & García-Martin, 1993; Thordisa ? millegrana

Species of gastropod

Aporodoris millegrana is a species of sea slug, a dorid nudibranch, shell-less marine gastropod mollusk in the family Discodorididae.

== Taxonomy ==
This species was originally discovered and described (under the name Doris millegrana) by Joshua Alder and Albany Hancock in 1854. Hermann von Ihering (1886) designated Doris millegrana Alder & Hancock, 1854 as a type species of the newly created genus Aporodoris Ihering, 1886. Charles Eliot (1910) provisionally used the name Aporodoris millegrana but he expressed doubts about validity of the genus Aporodoris and he has thought that Aporodoris could be synonymous with genus Thordisa Bergh, 1877. Thompson & Brown (1981) assigned this species to the genus Discodoris Bergh, 1877. Valdés & Gosliner (2001) synonymized genus Aporodoris with the genus Taringa Er. Marcus, 1955 because they (erroneously) considered the generic name Aporodoris unused since 1886 and they gave the precedence to widely used generic name Taringa. Valdés & Gosliner (2001) made an erroneous reversal precedence and International Commission on Zoological Nomenclature should publish a decision of what name should be used in such cases according to the Article 23.10 of the International Code of Zoological Nomenclature. In the meantime the name in prevailing usage must be used (according to the Article 23.10).

Dayrat (2010) agreed with synonymization of the genera Aporodoris and Taringa. But he considered the generic name Aporodoris and the specific name Aporodoris millegrana as valid with strict application of the Principle of Priority.

== Distribution ==
This species occurs in European waters: British Isles, France, Tenerife, Spain, Mediterranean Sea.

Alder & Hancock (1854) mentioned the locality Torbay, England in their paper but the type locality should be Torquay according to the name on labels of type material.

== Description ==
Alder and Hancock have described the new species according to preserved specimens. Alder's and Hancock's original text (the type description) reads as follows:

Doris millegrana Yellow or orange?: cloak covered with minute granular tubercles: oral tentacles linear: branchial plumes 6, bipinnate, retractile within a cavity. Length 1¼ inch.

The length of preserved specimens of type material varies from 15 mm to 28 mm. The color of live specimen is brown-orange or dark violet-brown. The color of preserved specimens is yellow. There are light violet-brown rhinophores with yellowish white apex on the head. There are 120 μm long caryophyllidia covering the whole dorsal part of the body. There are also 80 μm long tubercules on the body.
