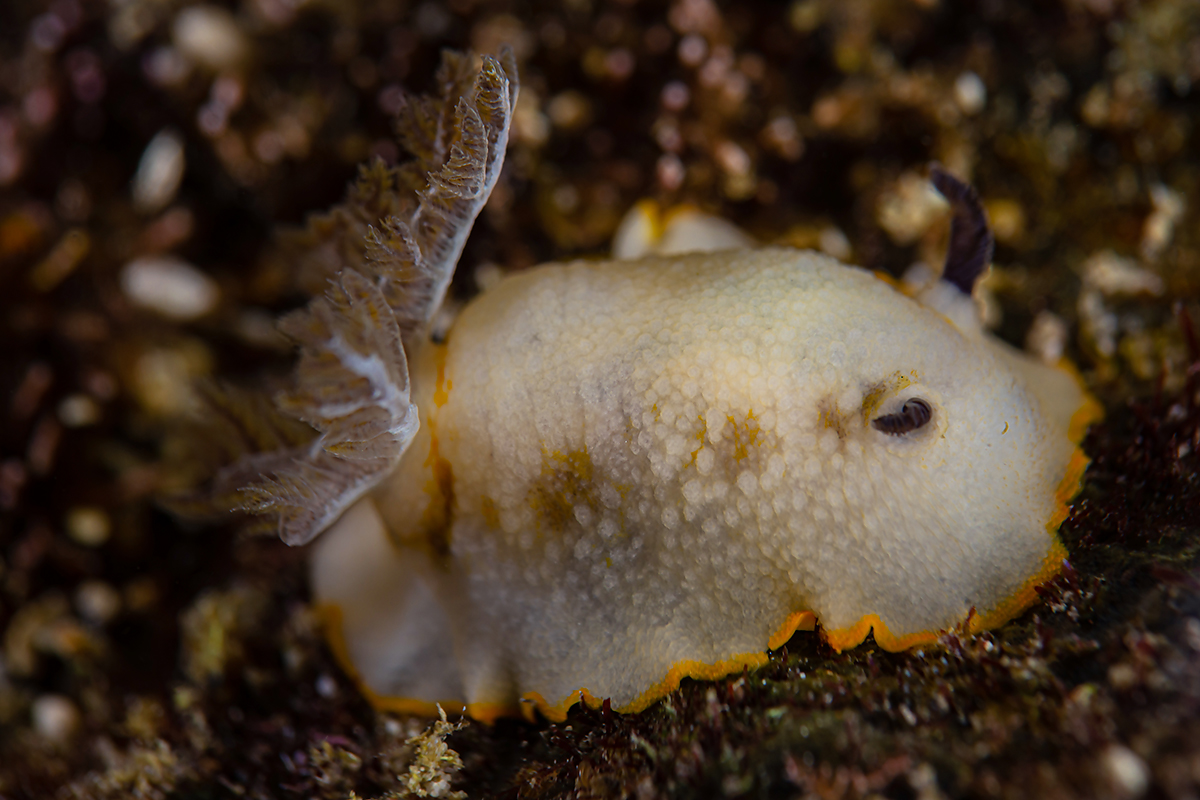
- Taringa sublutea

Scientific classification
- Kingdom: Animalia
- Phylum: Mollusca
- Class: Gastropoda
- Order: Nudibranchia
- Family: Discodorididae
- Genus: Taringa
- Species: T. sublutea

Binomial name
- Taringa sublutea (Abraham, 1877)

Synonyms
- Doris luteola Kelaart, 1858; Doris sublutea Abraham, 1877 (original combination); Taringa caudata (Farran, 1905); Trippa luteola (Kelaart, 1858); Thordisa caudata Farran, 1905; Trippa luteola (Kelaart, 1858) ·

= Taringa sublutea =

Species of gastropod

Taringa sublutea is a species of sea slug, a dorid nudibranch, a shell-less marine gastropod mollusc in the family Discodorididae.

== Distribution ==
This species was described from Trincomalee, Sri Lanka, (Ceylon). It has been reported from Madagascar, Réunion, Oman and Socotra Island.
