= National Route 234 (Costa Rica) =

National Road Route in Costa Rica

National Secondary Route 234
- Ruta nacional secundaria 234

Route information
- Maintained by Ministry of Public Works and Transport
- Length: 9.700 km (6.027 mi)

Location
- Country: Costa Rica
- Provinces: Limón

Highway system
- National Road Network of Costa Rica
← Route 233	→ Route 235

National Secondary Route 234, or just Route 234 (Spanish: Ruta Nacional Secundaria 234, or Ruta 234) is a National Road Route of Costa Rica, located in the Limón province.

== Description ==
In Limón province the route covers Limón canton (Valle La Estrella district).
