= Cahuita National Park =

Terrestrial and marine national park in Costa Rica

- IUCN category II (national park)
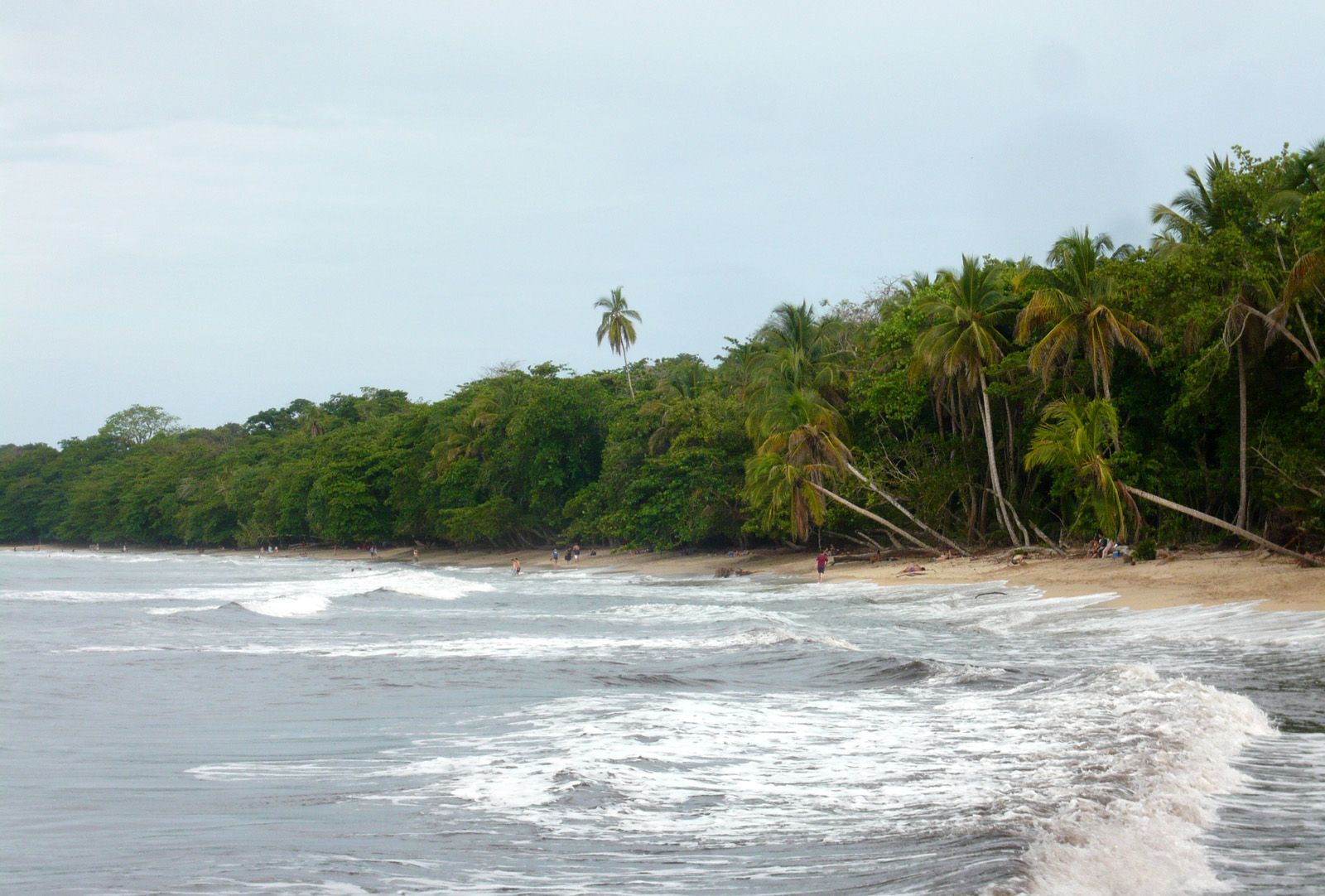
- Beach in Cahuita National Park
- Cahuita National Park area.
- Location: Costa Rica
- Nearest city: Cahuita
- Coordinates: 9°43′45″N 82°49′30″W
- Area: 10.679 km^{2} (4.123 sq mi) (land); 224.00 km^{2} (86.49 sq mi) (marine)
- Established: 27 December 1982
- Governing body: National System of Conservation Areas (SINAC)
- Location in Costa Rica

Cahuita National Park is a terrestrial and marine national park in the Caribbean La Amistad Conservation Area of Costa Rica located on the southern Caribbean coast in Limón Province, connected to the town of Cahuita. It protects beaches and lowlands and attracts tourists and other visitors who are able to snorkel in the protected marine area which contains the coralline reefs, as well as being a nesting ground for sea turtles. It covers a land area of 2,732 acres (1,106 ha), and a marine area of 55,200 acres (22,300 ha). February through April typically have the best underwater visibility. This is also one of the nicest and least developed beaches in Costa Rica.

The 600-acre (242-ha) reef is known to have at least 35 species of coral, 140 species of molluscs, 44 species of crustaceans, and 123 species of fish. The outer reef is about 4 km long. Live coral cover at the park's reef declined from approximately 40% in the early 1980s to less than 10% by the early 1990s, attributed to sediment runoff, bleaching events and other anthropogenic and natural impacts. On land there are many types of animal as well including northern tamanduas, pacas, white-nosed coatis, raccoons, sloths, agoutis, mantled howlers and white-headed capuchins. It has a variety of birds as well including the green ibis, green-and-rufous kingfisher and keel-billed toucan. Marine mammals are also present including orcas.

Due to its proximity to the town of Cahuita, the park's roads and facilities are well developed. Roads access the park from both the north and south. It can be reached on foot via Kelly Creek, which is just south of Cahuita.

== History ==
Originally the site was created as the Cahuita National Monument in 1970, and was reformed as a National Park in 1978. This change was ratified in 1982. Cahuita National Park also has the distinction of the only national park in Costa Rica not to charge an admission fee (at the Cahuita entrance) and instead relies on donations.

In 2025 two Danish slave ships, the Fridericus Quartus and Christianus Quintus were identified as the shipwrecks from 1710, their existence has been known for years in the national park.

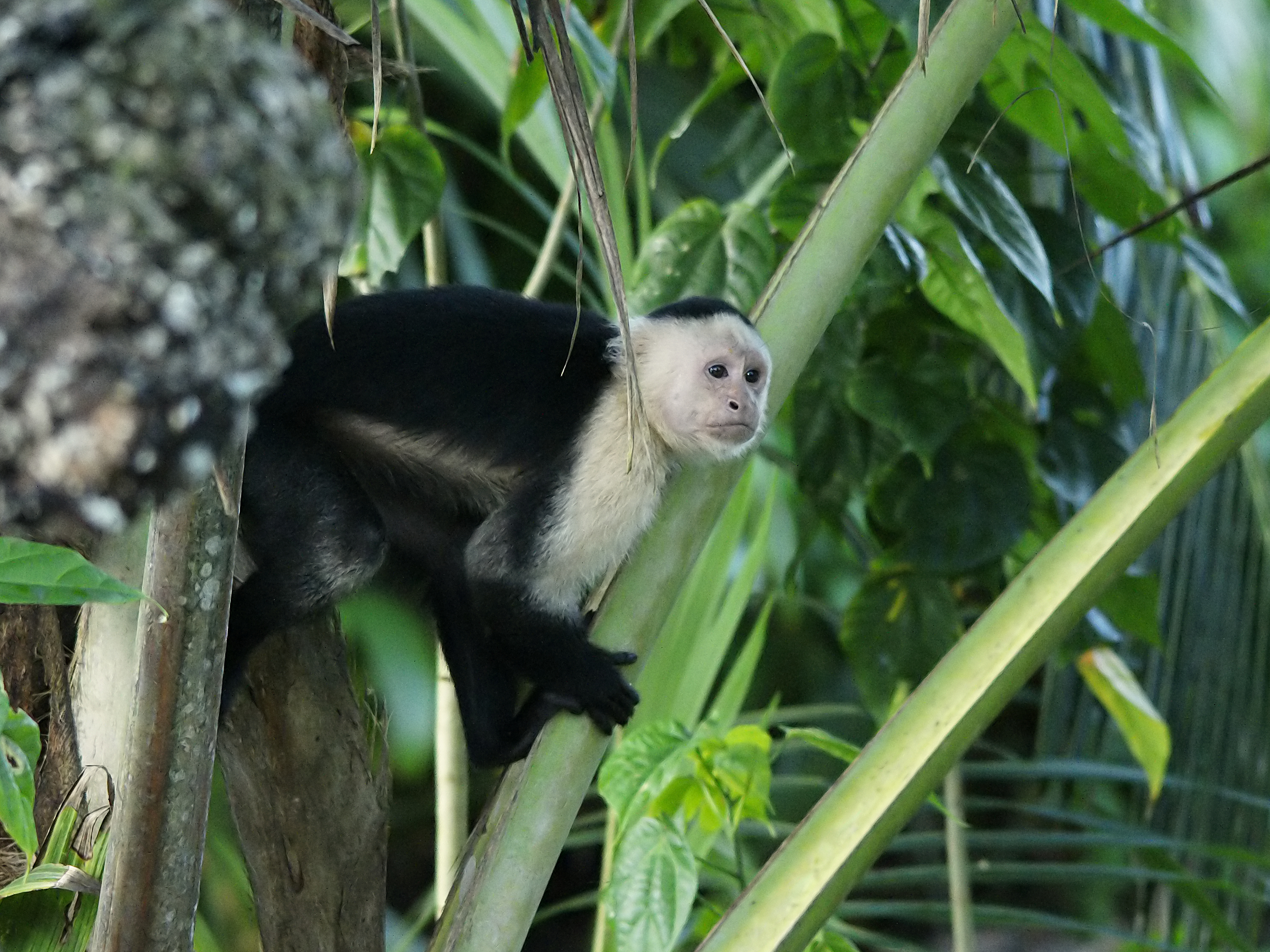
White-headed capuchin (Cebus imitator)

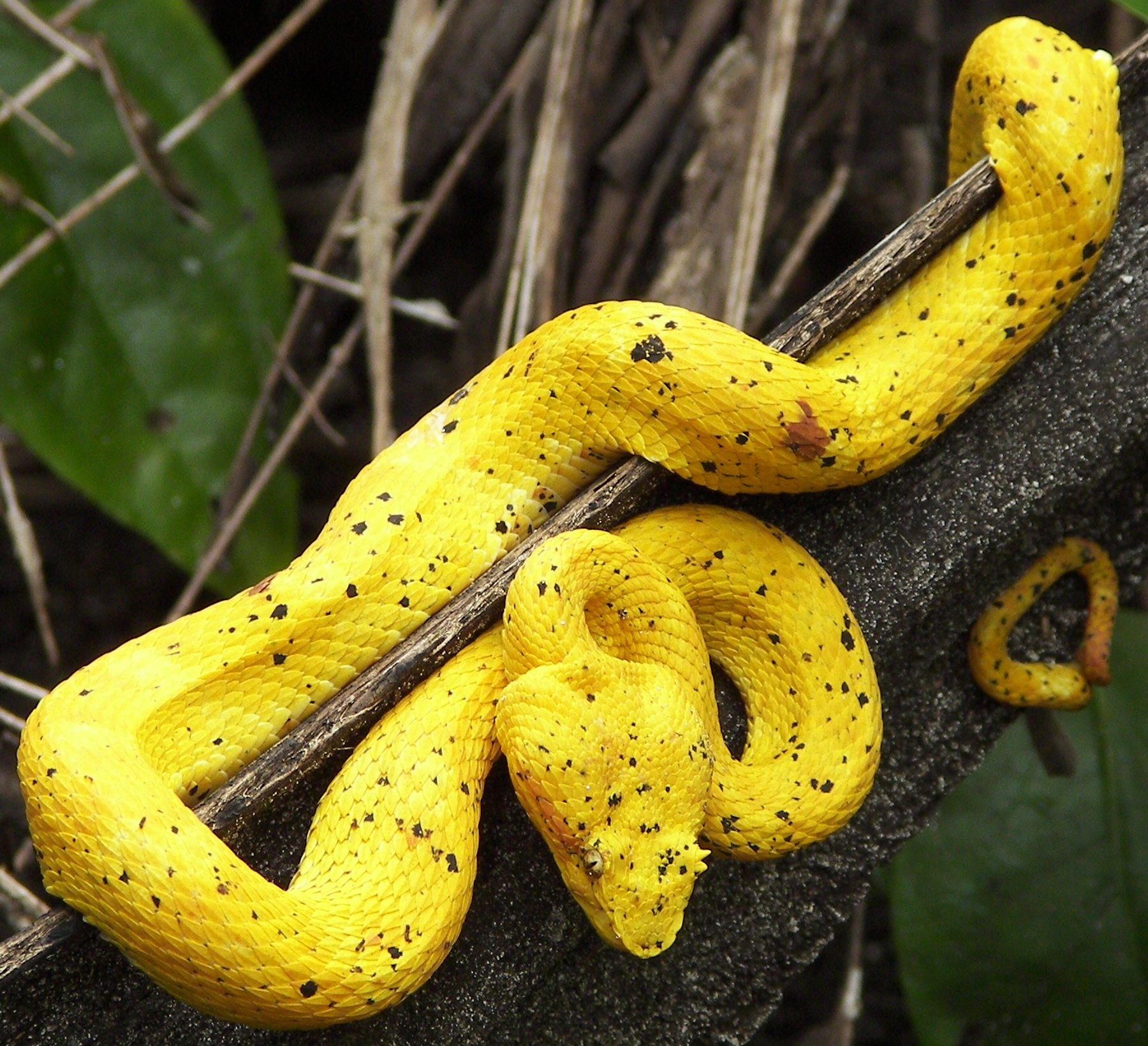
Eyelash viper, Spanish: bocaracá (Bothriechis schlegelii)

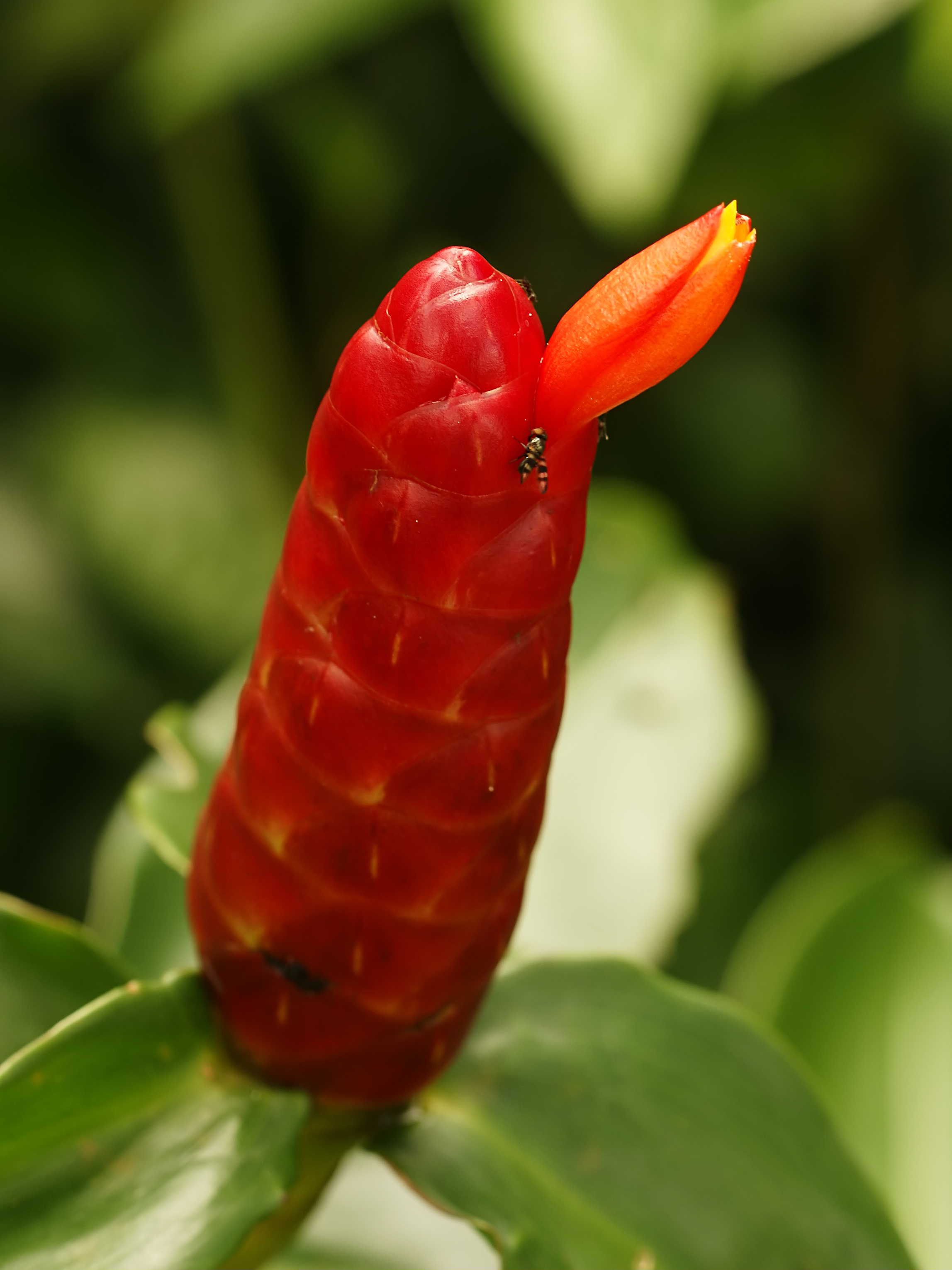
Sour cane (Costus woodsonii)

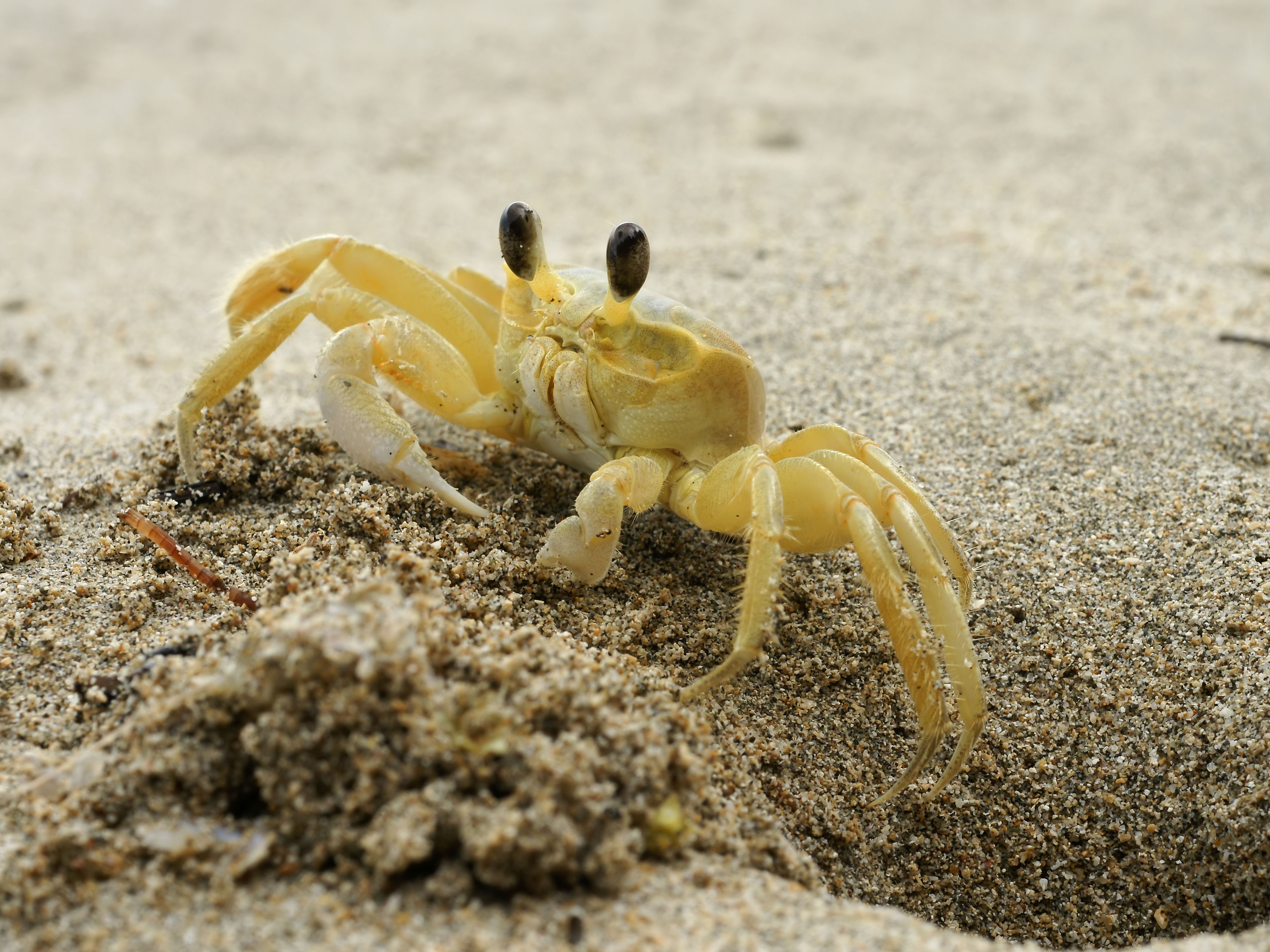
Atlantic ghost crab (Ocypode quadrata)

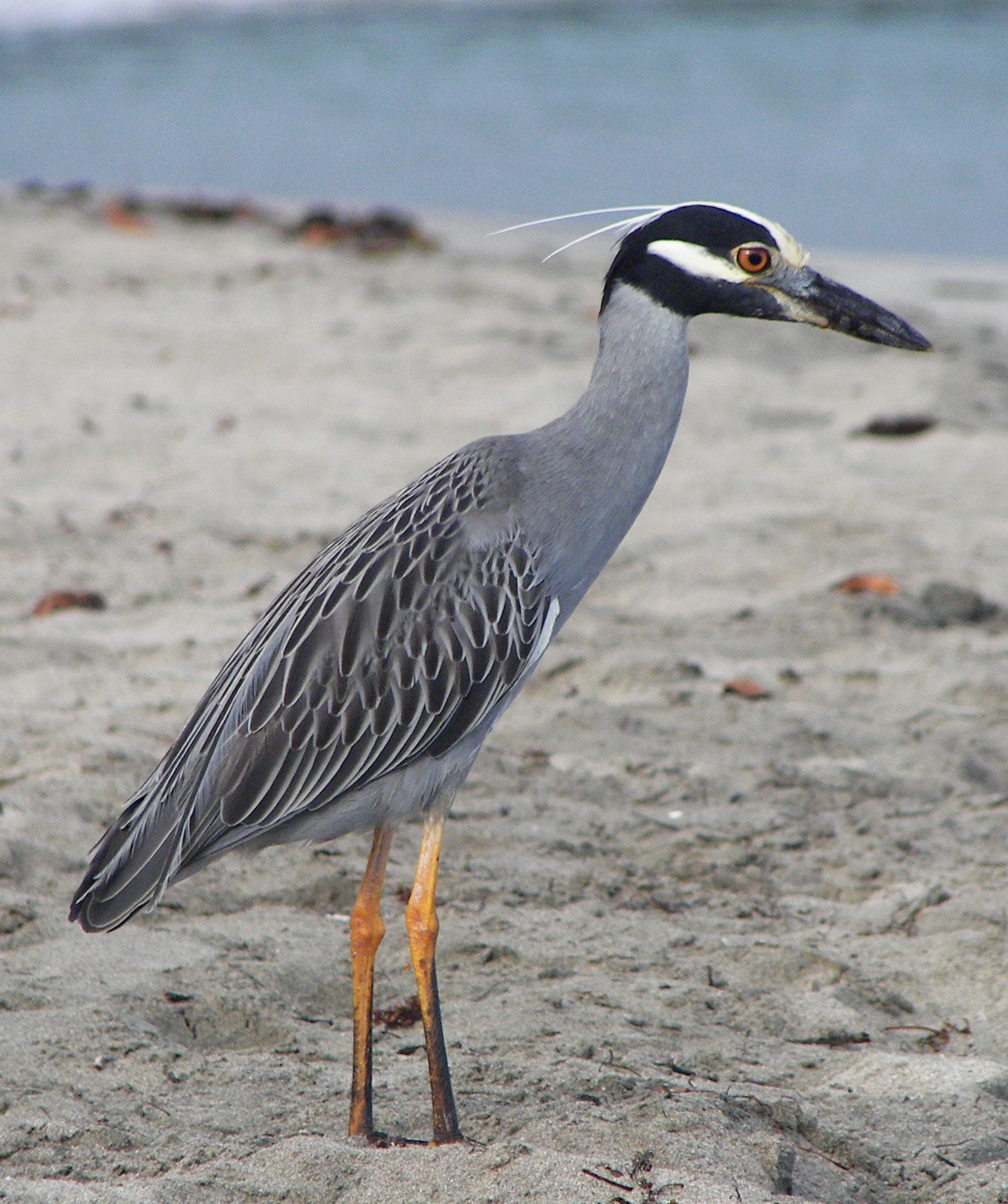
Yellow-crowned night heron (Nycticorax violaceus)

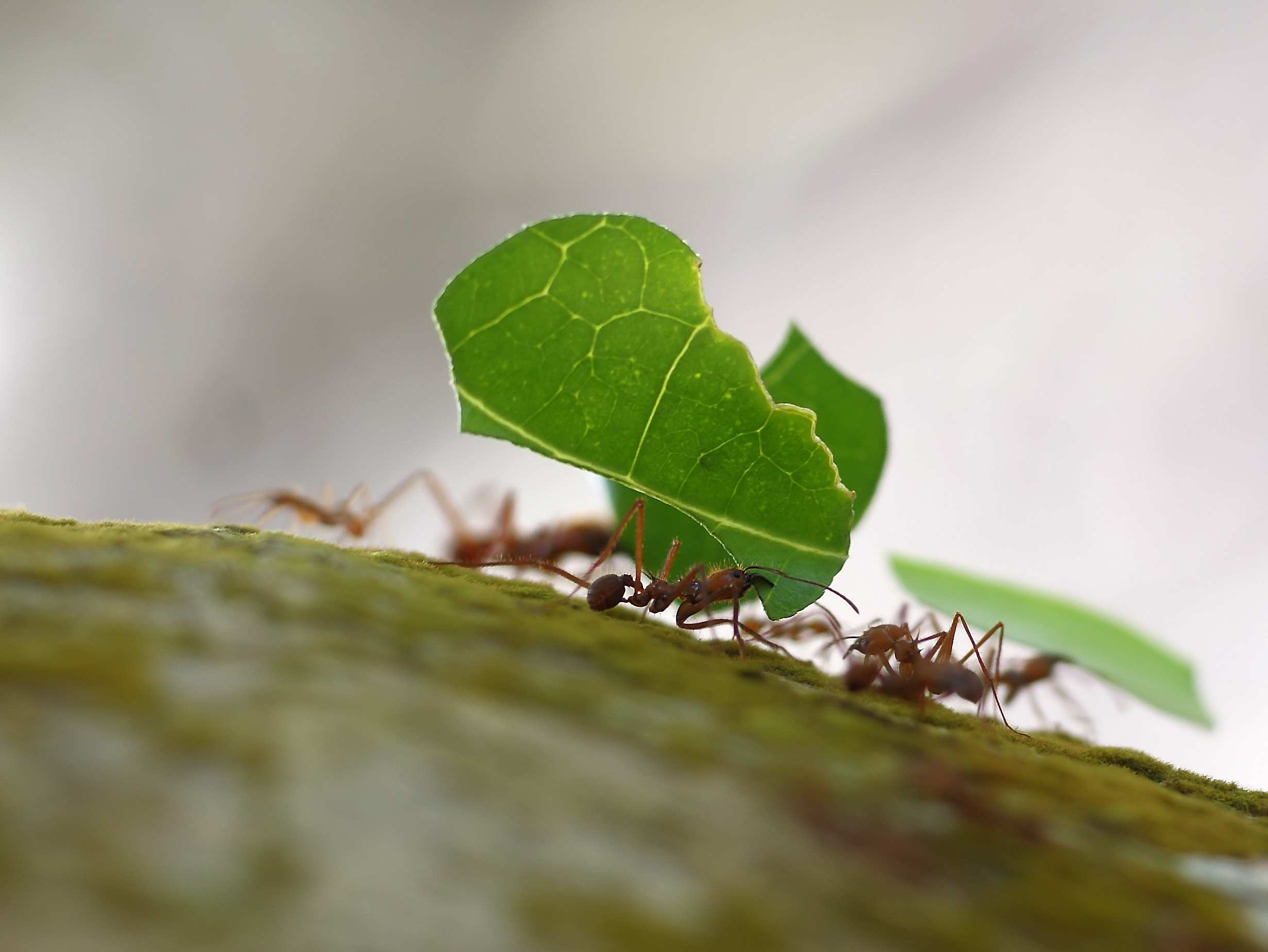
Atta cephalotes a leafcutter ant

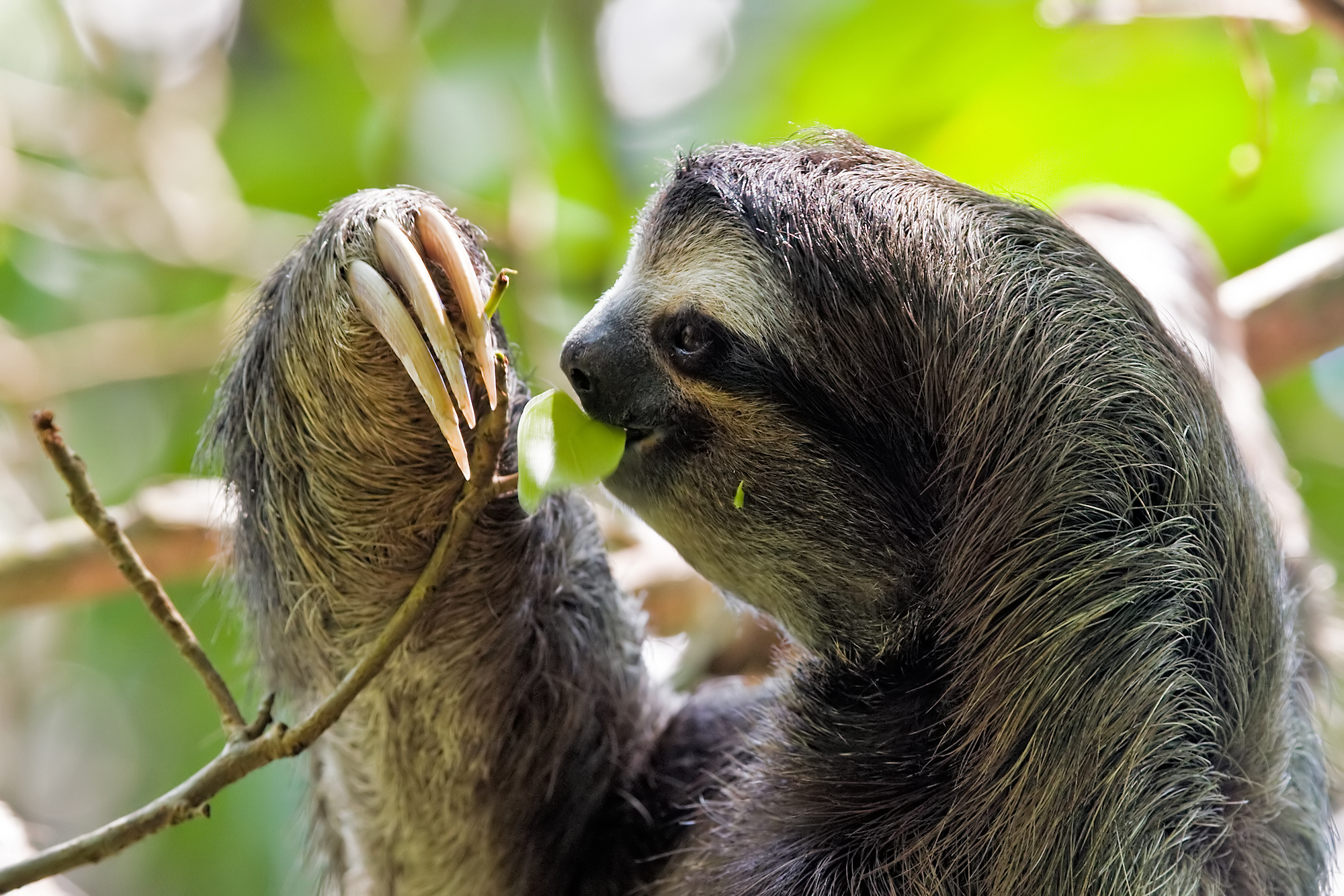
Brown-throated sloth (Bradypus variegatus)

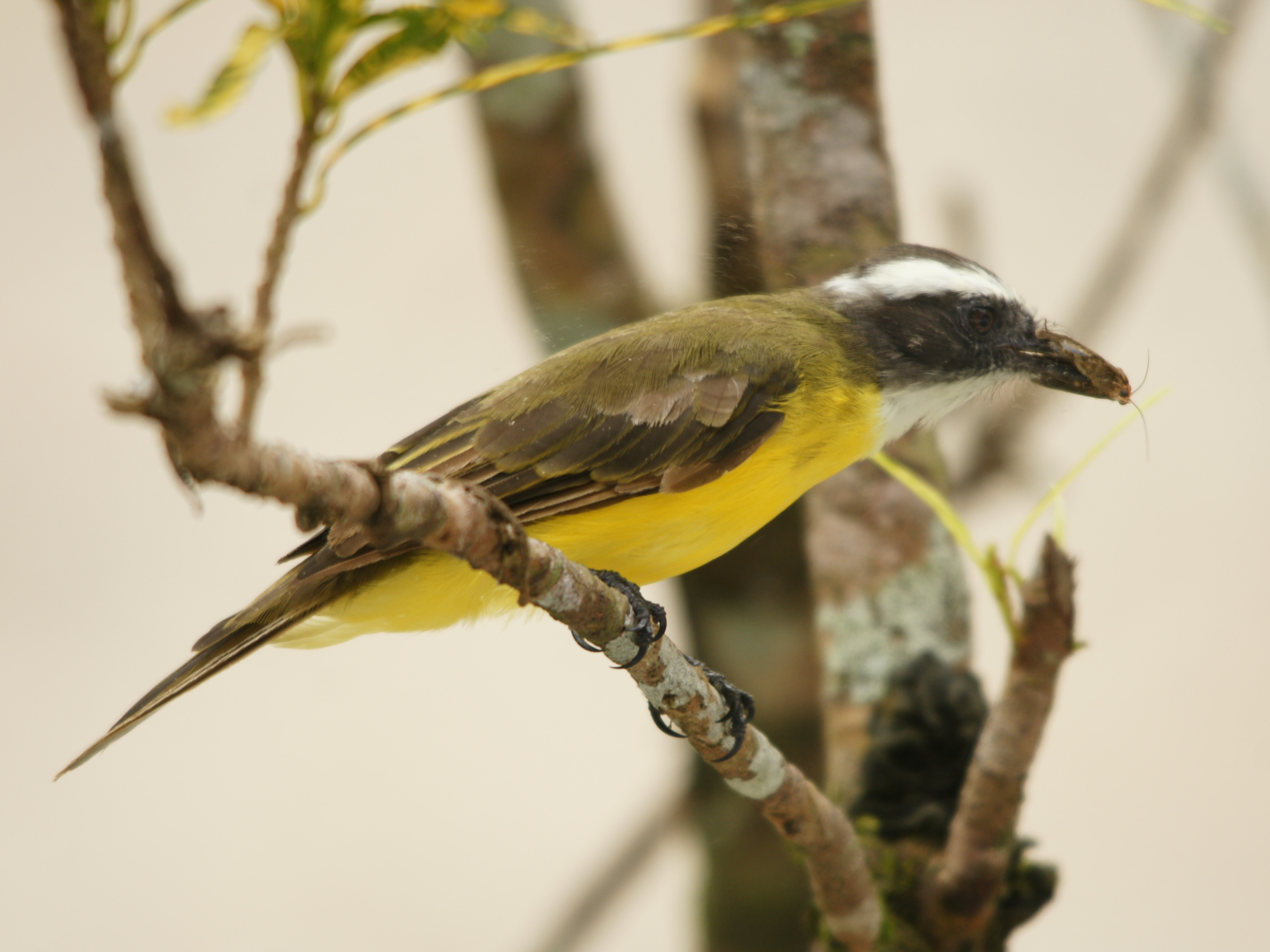
Social flycatcher (Myiozetetes similis)

== Gallery ==
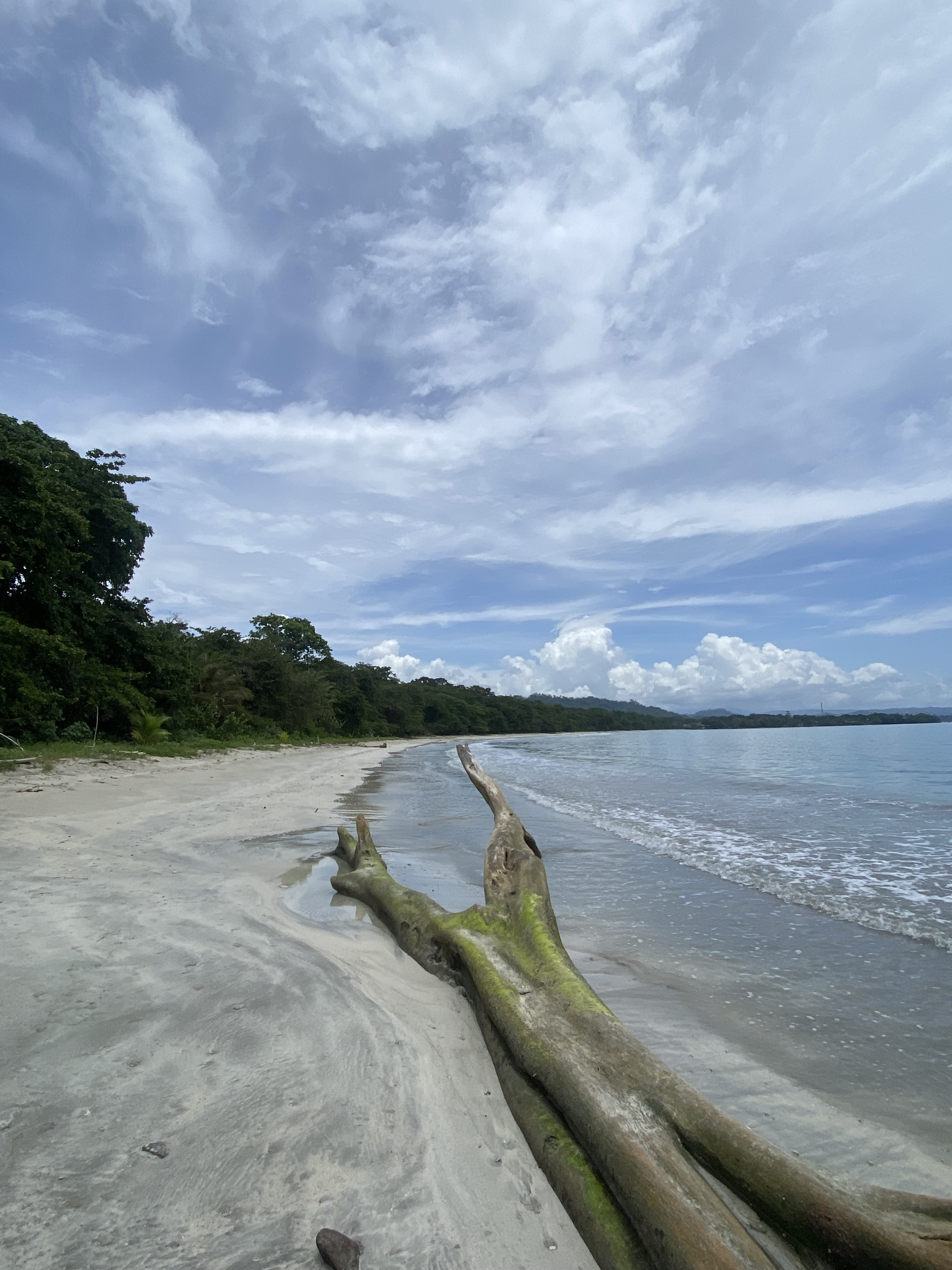
Beach in Cahuita National Park
