= Aco =

ACO, AcO, or Aco may refer to:

== Organizations ==
=== Orchestras ===
- Alvarez Chamber Orchestra
- American Composers Orchestra
- Australian Chamber Orchestra

=== Military organizations ===
- Air Cadet Organisation, collective name for the UK cadet forces sponsored by the Royal Air Force
- Allied Command Operations, the NATO strategic command

=== Sports bodies ===
- American Cornhole Organization
- Association of Cricket Officials
- Automobile Club de l'Ouest, sportscar racing governing body

=== Other organizations ===
- Accountable care organization, healthcare organization characterized by a specific payment and care delivery model
- ACO, C.A., a Venezuelan holding company
- Aco Records, a British 1920s record label
- The Airline Cooperative, an organization of international airlines formed in 2012
- Arts Center of the Ozarks, community theater in Springdale, Arkansas, US
- Australian College of Optometry
- Avenir du Congo, a political party in the Democratic Republic of the Congo
- Canadian Association of Orthodontists (Association canadienne des orthodontistes, ACO)

== People ==
- Aco (given name), a list of people
- Aco (musician) (born 1977), Japanese female singer
- Michel Aco (fl. 1680–1702), French explorer in North America

== Places ==
- Aco District, Concepción, Peru
- Aco District, Corongo, Peru
- Cobano Airport in Puntarenas Province, Costa Rica (IATA airport code ACO)

== Other uses ==
- Abell catalog of rich clusters of galaxies (ACO)
- Accountable care organization, a type of health system model
- Acetoxy group (AcO), a chemical functional group
- All-trans-8'-apo-beta-carotenal 15,15'-oxygenase, an enzyme
- Analog Coherent Optical module (CFP2-ACO), an interoperability agreement produced by the Optical Internetworking Forum
- Animal control officer, a qualified person in the Animal control service
- Ant colony optimization, a computer algorithm
- Assisted checkout, a machine that allows customers to complete their own transaction with a retailer

== See also ==
- ACCO (disambiguation)
- Acho, a surname
- Acos (disambiguation)
- Akko (disambiguation)
- Ako (disambiguation)
- CO (disambiguation)
