= ACCO =

Acco or ACCO may refer to:

- Acco (moth), a genus of moth
- Acco (Senones), a chief of Gaul, who induced his countrymen to revolt against Julius Caesar in 53 BC
- Acre, Israel (Hebrew: עַכּוֹ, ʻAkko)
- Acco super bulldozer, the largest bulldozer ever built
- ACCO Brands, an American office product manufacturer
- American Childhood Cancer Organization
- Association of Child Care Officers
- Associate of the Canadian College of Organists
- Acoma Pueblo, a village and tribe in New Mexico

== See also ==
- Siege of Acre (disambiguation)
- Acre (disambiguation)
- Akko (disambiguation)
- Aco (disambiguation)
- Ako (disambiguation)
- Acho (surname)
- Accos
