= Akko (disambiguation) =

Akko is a city in Israel.

Akko may also refer to:

== Places ==
- Akko, Nigeria
- Hakko, Armenia

== People ==
- Acco (Senones), Gallic ruler who revolted against Julius Caesar in the 50BCs
- Akiko Wada (born 1950), Japanese singer and television performer
- Akko, vocalist of Japanese pop group My Little Lover

=== Fictional characters ===
- Akko(-chan), the heroine of the manga Himitsu no Akko-chan
- Atsuko "Akko" Kagari, the protagonist of the Little Witch Academia franchise

== Other uses ==
- Akko (fish), a genus of gobies in subfamily Gobiinae

== See also ==
- Acre (disambiguation)
- Siege of Acre (disambiguation)
- ACCO (disambiguation)
- Acho, a surname
- Aco (disambiguation)
- Ak (disambiguation)
- Akho, 17th-century Gujarati poet
- Ako (disambiguation)
