= Ako =

Ako or AKO may refer to:

== Places ==
- Akō, Hyōgo, a city located in Hyōgo Prefecture, Japan
- Akō District, Hyōgo, a district located in Hyōgo Prefecture, Japan
- Ako, Cameroon, a town in Cameroon
- Ako, the Japanese name of Alexandrovsk-Sakhalinsky
- Acoma Pueblo, a village and tribe in New Mexico

== People ==
- Ako Adjei (1916–2002), Ghanaian statesman, politician, lawyer and journalist
- Ako Abdul-Samad (born 1951), American politician
- Ako Castuera (born 1978), American artist
- Ako Kondo (近藤 亜香; born 1991), Japanese ballet dancer
- Ako Kurdnasab, Kurdish journalist
- Ako Mayama (真山 亜子; born 1958), True name: Rin Mizuhara, is a Japanese voice actress
- Ako Mitchell, British-American actor and filmmaker
- Ako, the Livonian chieftain of Salaspils, killed in 1206
- Ako (actress), Japanese actress
- Ako Tribe, a Kurdish tribe in the Erbil Governorate

== Fictional characters ==
- Ako, fictional character from the Capcom video game, Onimusha 3: Demon Siege
- A-ko, the female protagonist in the anime Project A-ko
- Ako Izumi, a fictional character from the manga Negima
- Ako Shirabe, a protagonist from the anime Suite PreCure
- Ako Hayasaka, a protagonist from the Choujin Sentai Jetman
- Ako Amau, a fictional character from the RPG game, Blue Archive
- Ako Udagawa, a fictional character from the Media franchise, BanG Dream!

== Other uses ==
- Army Knowledge Online
- AKO, the IATA code for Colorado Plains Regional Airport in Akron, Colorado
- AKO or Algemene Kiosk Onderneming, a chain of 72 bookstores and newsstands in the Netherlands

== See also ==
- Akko (disambiguation)
- ACCO (disambiguation)
- Aco (disambiguation)
- Ko (disambiguation)
- Acho (surname)
- Ákos (name)
- Akho
