= Camuffo di Portogruaro =

Ship producer in Venice, Italy

- Native name: Cantiere Navale Camuffo
- Industry: Shipbuilding
- Founded: 1438
- Headquarters: Via Zambaldi 33, 30026 Portogruaro, Italy
- Website: www.camuffo.it/EN

Camuffo di Portogruaro or Cantiere navale Camuffo is a ship producer from Portogruaro, Metropolitan City of Venice, Italy.

The shipyard was founded in 1438 in Heraklion, Crete under the rule of the Venetian Republic and is the oldest shipyard in the world.

== See also ==
- List of oldest companies
