= Acos =

ACOS or Acos may refer to:

- Arccosine, an inverse trigonometric function
- The Advanced Comprehensive Operating System mainframe computer operating system
- Acos District in Peru
- Acos Vinchos District in Peru
- A Crown of Swords novel

== See also ==
- Aco (disambiguation)
- Cos (disambiguation)
