= Bulldozer =

Earth-moving machine

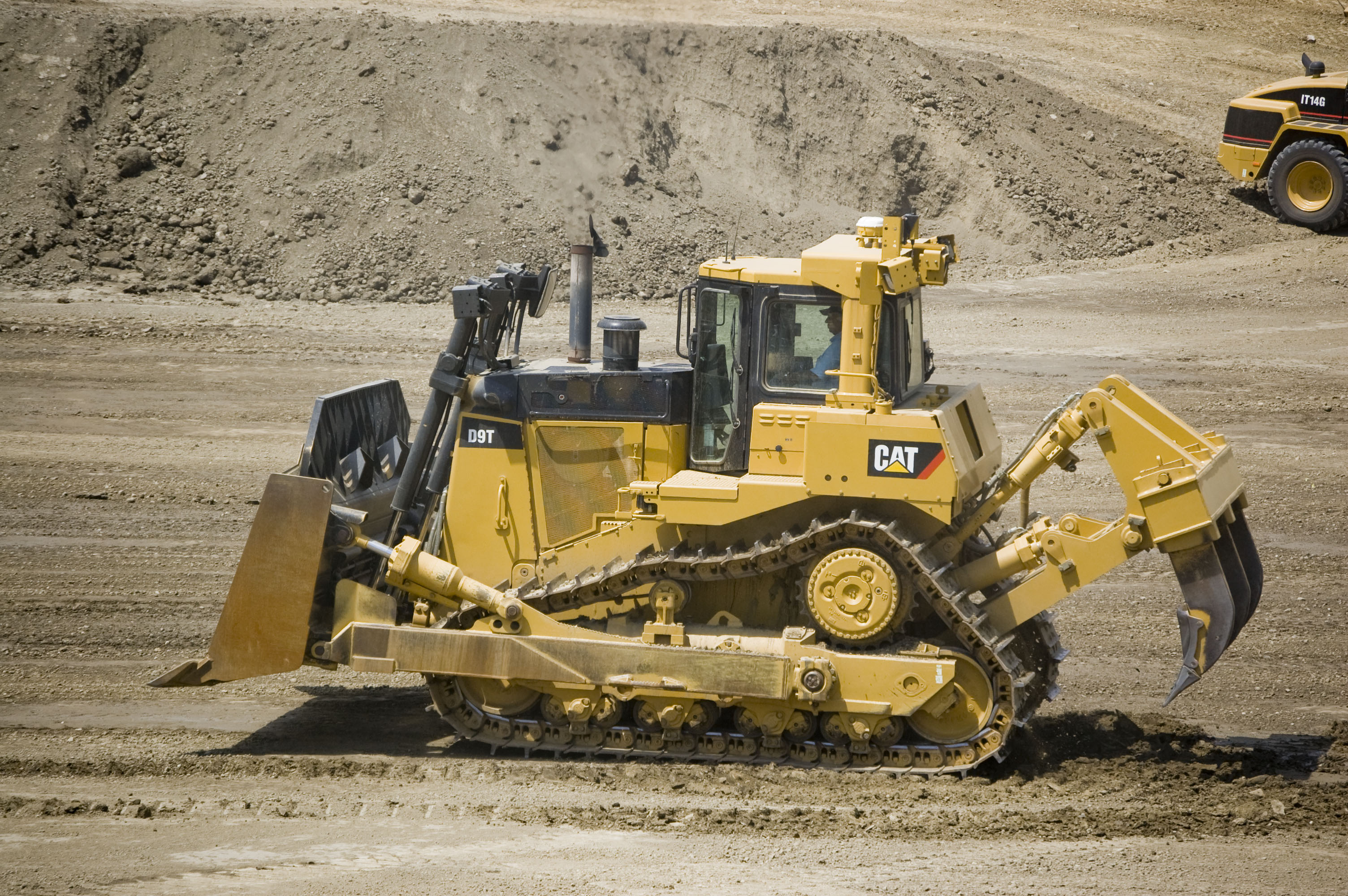
A large bulldozer with multi-shank ripper, the Caterpillar D9

A bulldozer or dozer (also called a crawler or Track-type Tractor) is a large tractor equipped with a metal blade at the front for pushing material (soil, sand, snow, rubble, or rock) during construction work. It travels most commonly on continuous tracks, though specialized models riding on large off-road tires are also produced. Its most popular accessory is a ripper, a large hook-like device mounted singly or in multiples in the rear to loosen dense materials.

Bulldozers are used heavily in large and small scale construction, road building, mining and quarrying, on farms, in heavy industry factories, and in military applications in both peace and wartime. Track-type tractors (commonly bulldozers) are heavy-duty, tracked earthmoving machines designed for maximum traction, stability, and pushing power on soft, steep, or uneven terrain. Utilizing continuous steel or rubber tracks, they excel in land clearing, heavy grading, and fine finish work. Key benefits include lower ground pressure and superior flotation compared to wheeled machines.

The word "bulldozer" refers only to a motorized unit fitted with a blade designed for pushing. The word is sometimes used inaccurately for other heavy equipment such as the generally similar front-end loader designed for carrying material rather than pushing it. The term originally referred only to the blade attachment but is now commonly applied to any crawler tractor with a front-mounted blade.

== Etymology ==
The etymologist Anatoly Liberman dismissed as 'folk etymology' the notion that, in the USA, a "bulldose" was a large dose (namely, one large enough to be literally or figuratively effective against a bull) of any sort of medicine. He commented that "bulldoze had existed in the depths of some dialects long enough to become opaque to speakers." Liberman's theory was that, from the 16th century, the verb douse/dowse/douze, of German or Dutch origin, had various meanings including “strike, punch, beat down,” and that the term was subsequently applied to bull-baiting.

By the late 1870s, "to bulldoze" and "bulldozing" were being used throughout the United States to describe intimidation "by violent and unlawful means", which sometimes meant a severe whipping or coercion, or other intimidation, such as at gunpoint. It had a particular meaning in the Southern United States as a whipping or other punishment for African Americans to suppress black voter turnout in the 1876 United States presidential election. By 1886, the term was also applied to a large-caliber pistol and the person who wielded it.

By the late 19th century: "Bulldozing" meant using brute force to push over or through any obstacle, with reference to two bulls pushing against each other's heads in a fight over dominance. The use of these as tractor attachments appeared as early as 1929, but were known as "bull grader" blades, and the term "bulldozer blade" did not appear to come into widespread use until the mid-1930s when such equipped tractors were widely used in US infrastructure projects such as the Hoover Dam. "Bulldozer" has evolved to describe the whole machine, not just the attachment. In contemporary usage, "bulldozer" is sometimes shortened to "dozer", and the verb "bulldozing" to "dozing", thus making a homophone with the pre-existing unrelated verb "dozing" (for being somnolent, napping).

== History ==
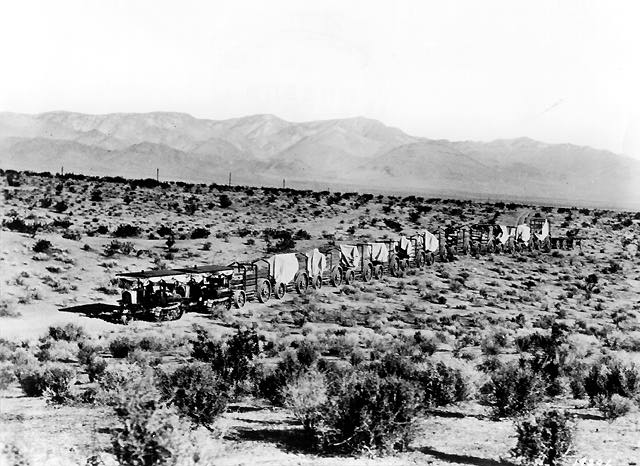
Two Holt 45 gas crawling-type tractors team up to pull a long wagon train in the Mojave Desert during construction of the Los Angeles Aqueduct in 1909.

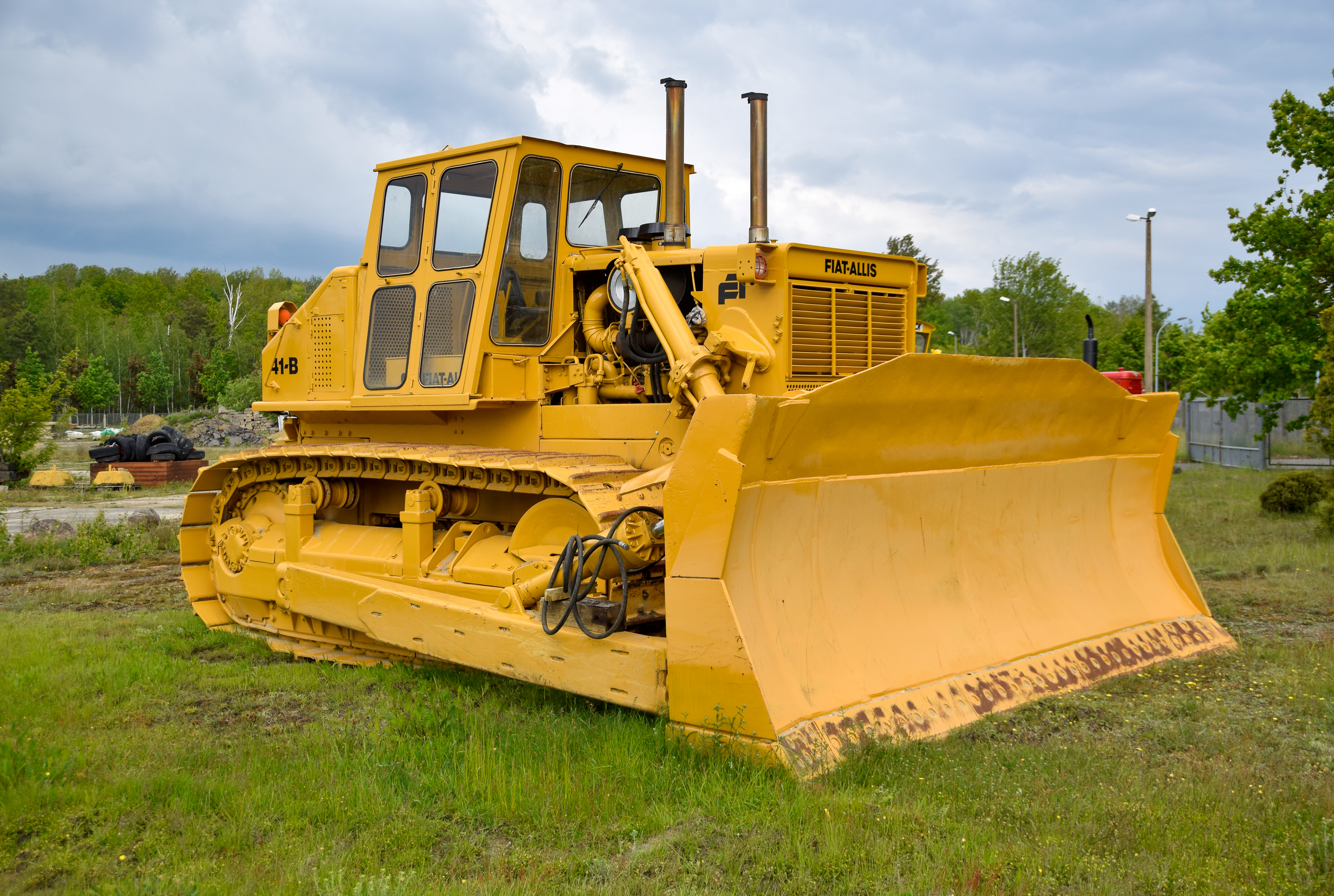
Heavy 1970s bulldozer Fiatallis 41-B, the largest of its day

The first bulldozers were adapted from Holt farm tractors that were used to plough fields. The versatility of tractors in soft ground for logging and road building contributed to the development of the armored tank in World War I.

In 1923, farmer James Cummings and draftsman J. Earl McLeod made the first designs for the bulldozer. A replica is on display at the city park in Morrowville, Kansas, where the two built the first bulldozer. On December 18, 1923, Cummings and McLeod filed U.S. patent #1,522,378 that was later issued on January 6, 1925, for an "Attachment for Tractors."

By the 1920s, tracked vehicles became common, particularly the Caterpillar 60. Rubber-tired vehicles came into use in the 1940s. To dig canals, raise earthen dams, and do other earth-moving jobs, these tractors were equipped with a large, thick, metal plate in front. (The blade got its curved shape later). In some early models, the driver sat on top in the open without a cabin. The three main types of bulldozer blades are a U-blade for pushing and carrying soil relatively long distances, a straight blade for "knocking down" and spreading piles of soil, and a brush rake for removing brush and roots. These attachments (home-built or built by small equipment manufacturers of attachments for wheeled and crawler tractors and trucks) appeared by 1929.

Widespread acceptance of the bull-grader does not seem to appear before the mid-1930s. The addition of power down-force provided by hydraulic cylinders instead of just the weight of the blade made them the preferred excavation machine for large and small contractors alike by the 1940s, by which time the term "bulldozer" referred to the entire machine and not just the attachment.

Over the years, bulldozers got bigger and more powerful in response to the demand for equipment suited for ever larger earthworks. Firms such as Caterpillar, Komatsu, Clark Equipment Company, Case, Euclid, Allis-Chalmers, Liebherr, LiuGong, Terex, Fiatallis, John Deere, Massey Ferguson, BEML, XGMA, and International Harvester manufactured large, tracked-type earthmoving machines. RG LeTourneau and Caterpillar manufactured large, rubber-tired bulldozers.

Bulldozers grew more sophisticated as time passed. Improvements include drivetrains analogous to (in automobiles) an automatic transmission instead of a manual transmission, such as the early Euclid C-6 and TC-12 or Model C Tournadozer, blade movement controlled by hydraulic cylinders or electric motors instead of early models' cable winch/brake, and automatic grade control. Hydraulic cylinders enabled the application of down force, more precise manipulation of the blade, and automated controls.

A more recent innovation is the outfitting of bulldozers with GPS technology, such as manufactured by Topcon Positioning Systems, Inc., Trimble Inc, or Leica Geosystems, for precise grade control and (potentially) "stakeless" construction. As a response to the many, and often varying claims about these systems, the Kellogg Report published in 2010 a detailed comparison of all the manufacturers' systems, evaluating more than 200 features for dozers alone.

The best-known maker of bulldozers is Caterpillar. Komatsu, Liebherr, Case, Hitachi, Volvo, and John Deere are present-day competitors. Although these machines began as modified farm tractors, they became the mainstay for big civil construction projects, and found their way into use by military construction units worldwide. The best-known model, the Caterpillar D9, was also used to clear mines and demolish enemy structures.

== Description ==
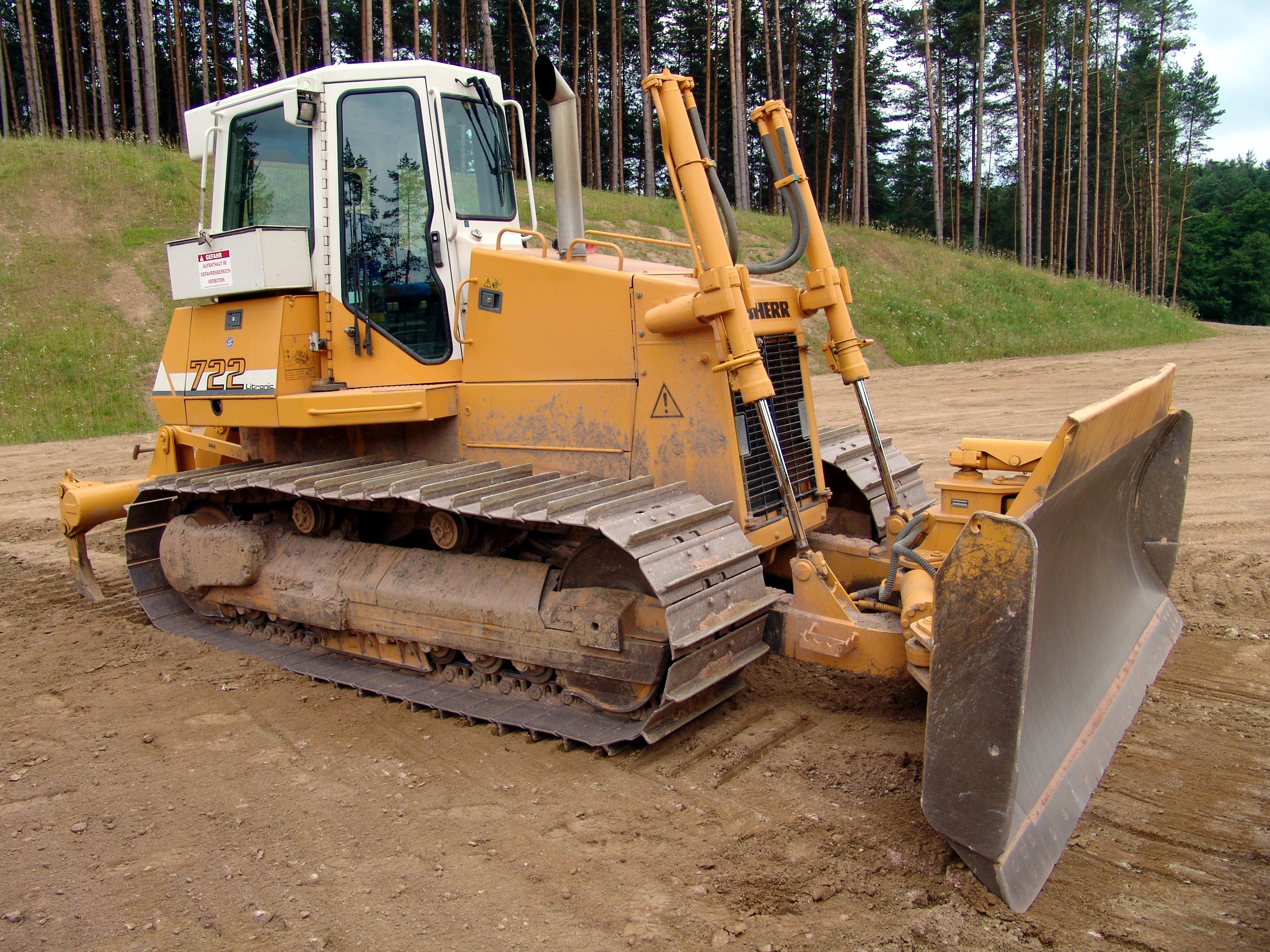
A Liebherr bulldozer with a straight blade

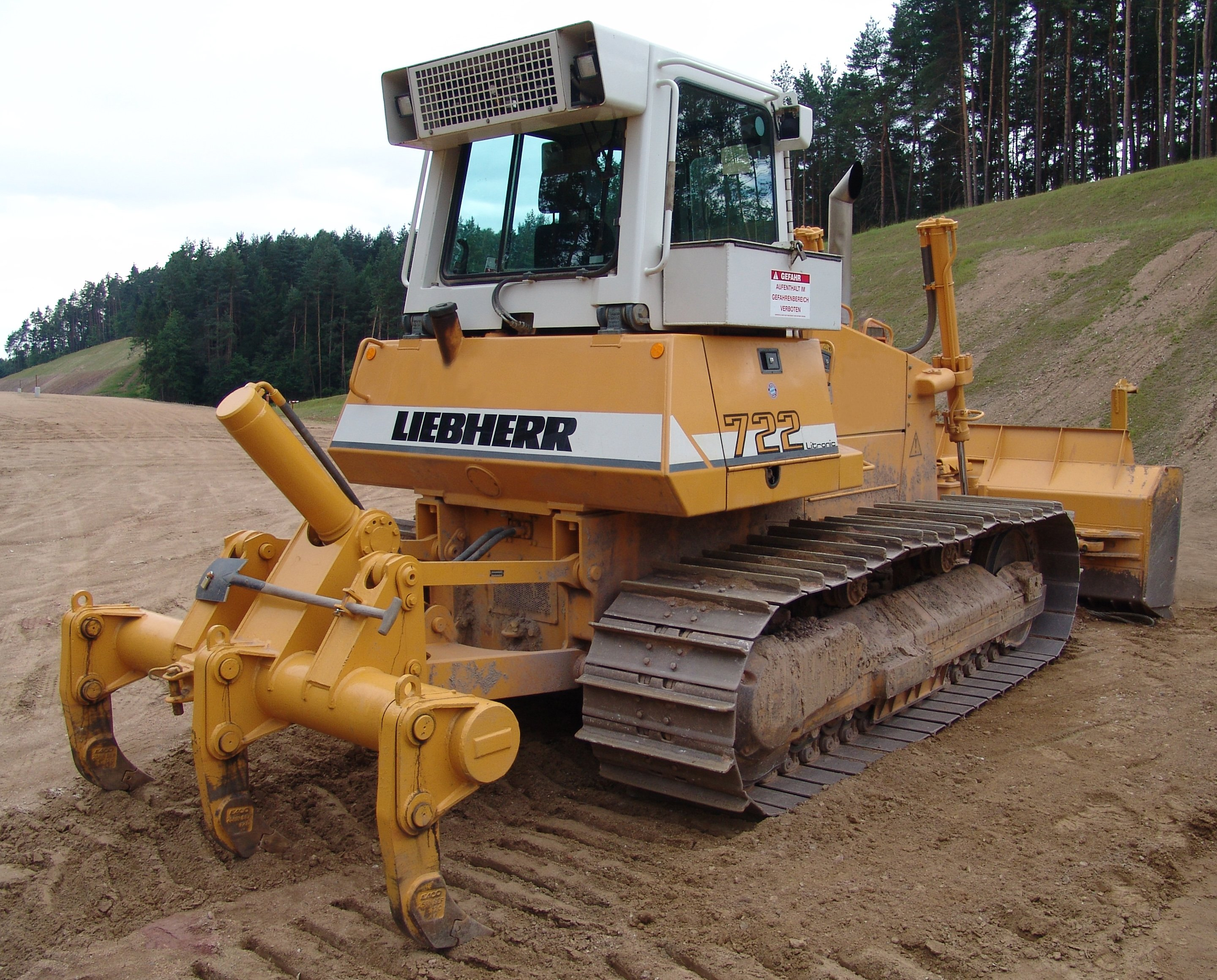
The same bulldozer's multishank ripper

Typically, bulldozers are large and powerful tractors with continuous tracked treads. The tracks give them excellent traction and mobility through very rough terrain. Wide tracks also help distribute the vehicle's weight over a large area (decreasing ground pressure), thus preventing it from sinking in sandy or muddy ground. Extra-wide tracks are known as swamp tracks or low ground pressure (lgp) tracks. Bulldozers have transmission systems designed to take advantage of the track system and provide excellent tractive force.

These traits allow bulldozers to excel in road building, construction, mining, forestry, land clearing, infrastructure development, and any other projects requiring highly mobile, powerful, and stable earth-moving equipment.

Commercial earthmoving fleets may include different dozer sizes and configurations for applications such as grading, land clearing, road construction and mining. EKWA Contractors operates Caterpillar D6, D8, D9 and D10 dozers for these types of projects in Western Australia.

A variant is the all-wheel-drive wheeled bulldozer, which generally has four large rubber-tired wheels, hydraulically operated articulated steering, and a hydraulically actuated blade mounted forward of the articulation joint.

The bulldozer's primary tools are the blade and the ripper:

=== Blade ===
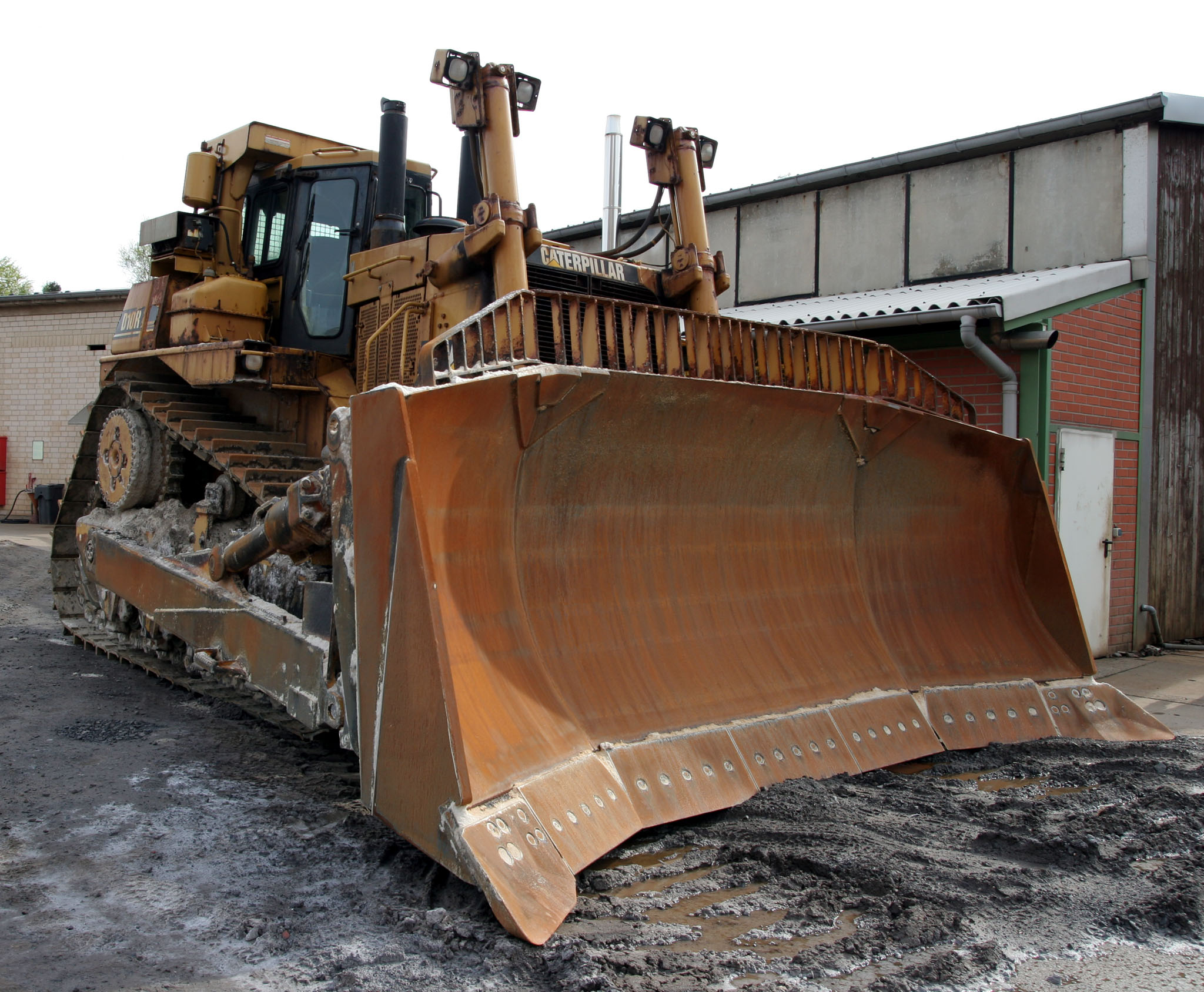
Bulldozer with combination blade

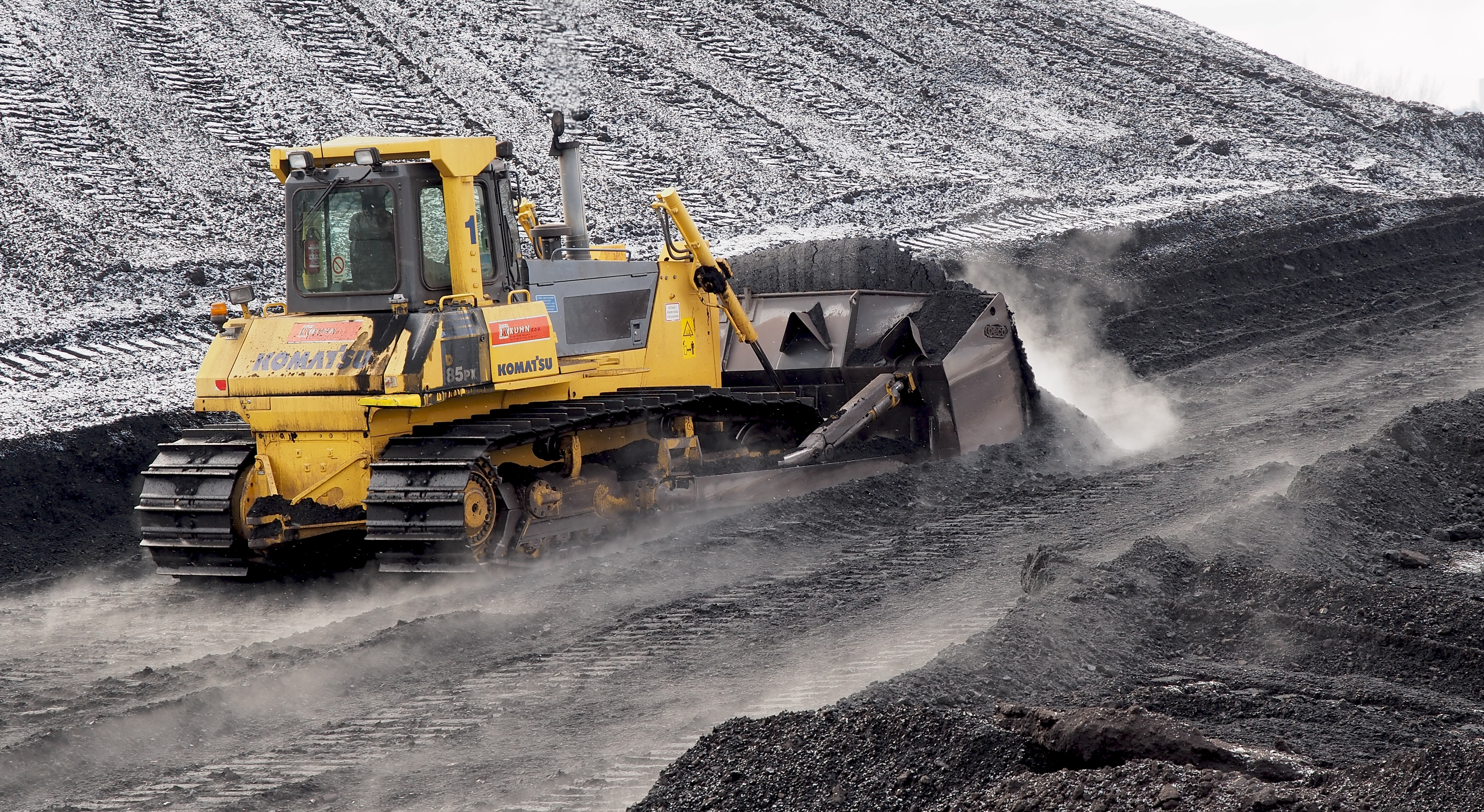
Bulldozer pushing up to 7 m^{3} with semi-U blade with large side wings

Bulldozer blades come in three types:

- straight ("S blade"), short with no lateral curve or side wings. Can be used for fine grading.
- universal ("U blade"), tall and very curved, with large side wings to maximize load.
- combination ("S-U", or semi-U), shorter, with less curvature and smaller side wings. It is typically used for pushing large rocks, as at a quarry.

Blades can be fitted straight across the frame, or at an angle. All can be lifted; some, with additional hydraulic cylinders, can be tilted to vary the angle up to one side.

Sometimes, a bulldozer is used to push or pull another piece of earth-moving equipment known as a "scraper" to increase productivity. The towed Fresno Scraper, invented in 1883 by James Porteous, was the first design to enable this to be done economically, removing the soil from an area being cut and depositing where needed as fill. Dozer blades with a reinforced center section for pushing are known as "bull blades".

Dozer blades are added to combat engineering vehicles and other military equipment, such as artillery tractors such as the Type 73 or M8 tractor, to clear battlefield obstacles and prepare firing positions. Dozer blades may be mounted on main battle tanks to clear antitank obstacles or mines, and dig improvised shelters.

=== Ripper ===
A ripper is a long, claw-like shank that may be mounted singly or in multiples on the rear of a bulldozer to loosen hard and impacted materials. It is raised and lowered as desired by hydraulic cylinders. Usually a single shank is preferred for heavy ripping. The ripper is equipped with a replaceable tungsten steel alloy tip, known as a boot.

Ripping can not only loosen soil (such as podzol hardpan) in agricultural and construction applications but break shaly rock or pavement into easily handled rubble.

A variant of the ripper is the stumpbuster, a single spike protruding horizontally used to split a tree stump.

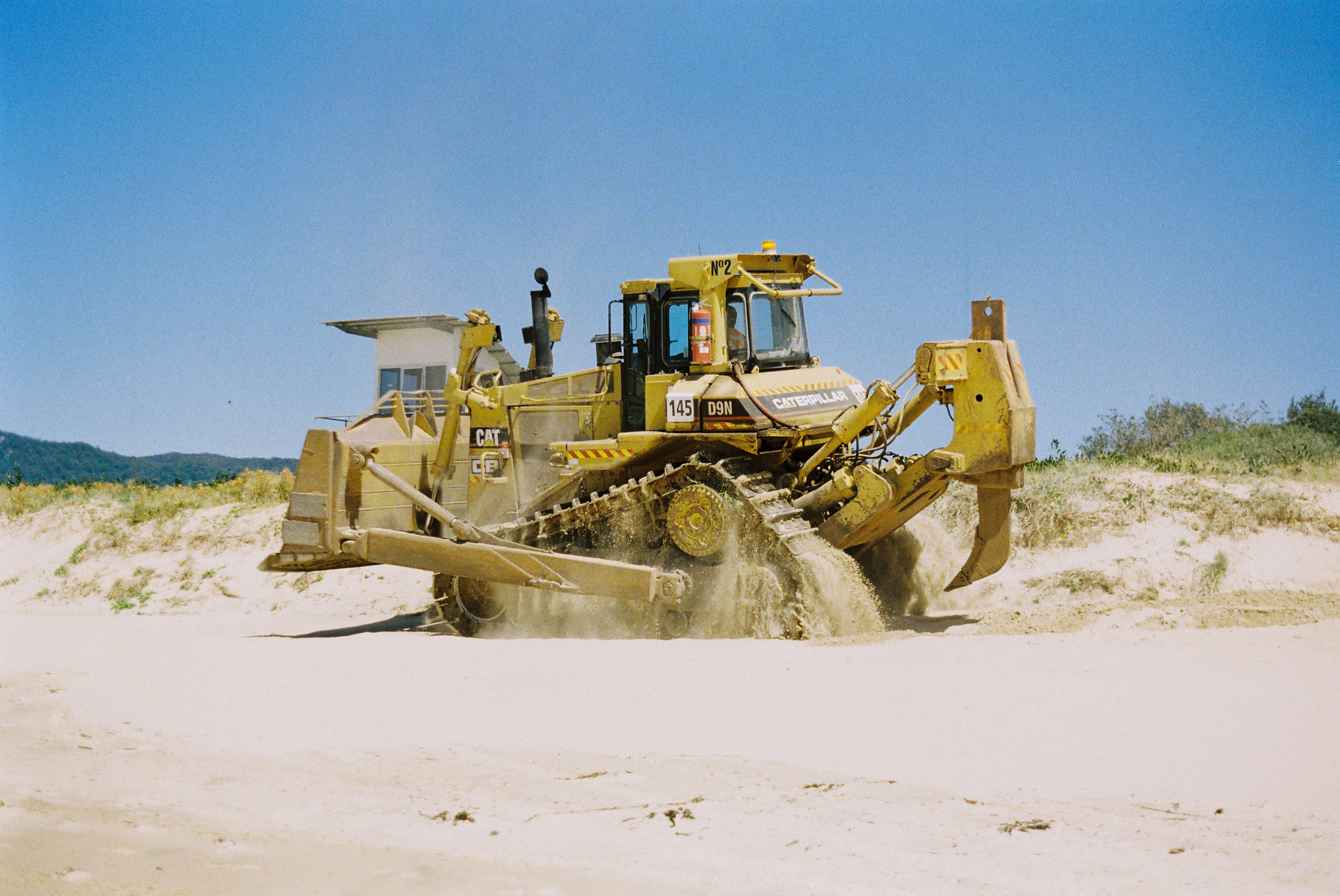
A Caterpillar D9N equipped with a single-shank ripper

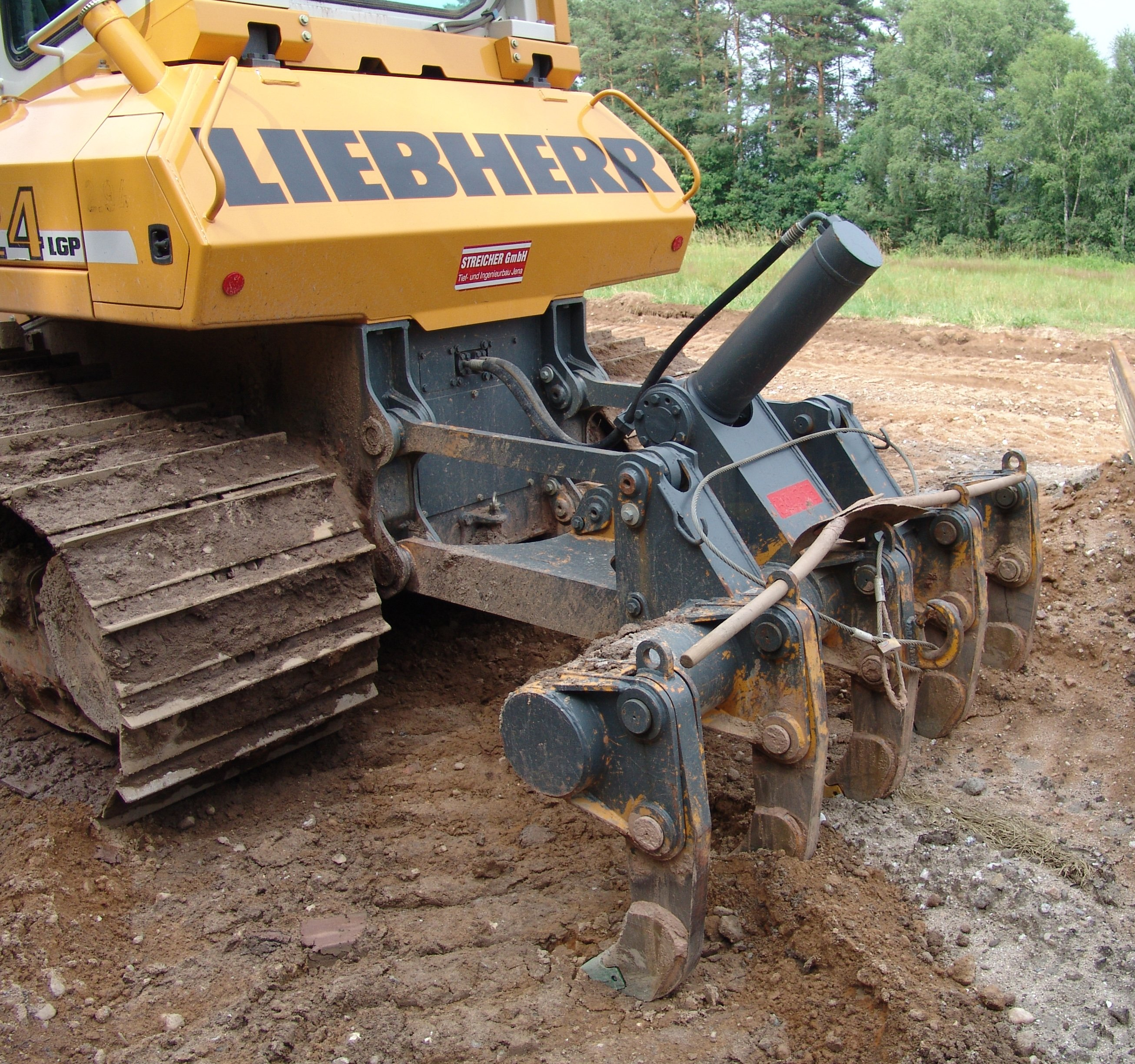
Multishank ripper

== Variants ==
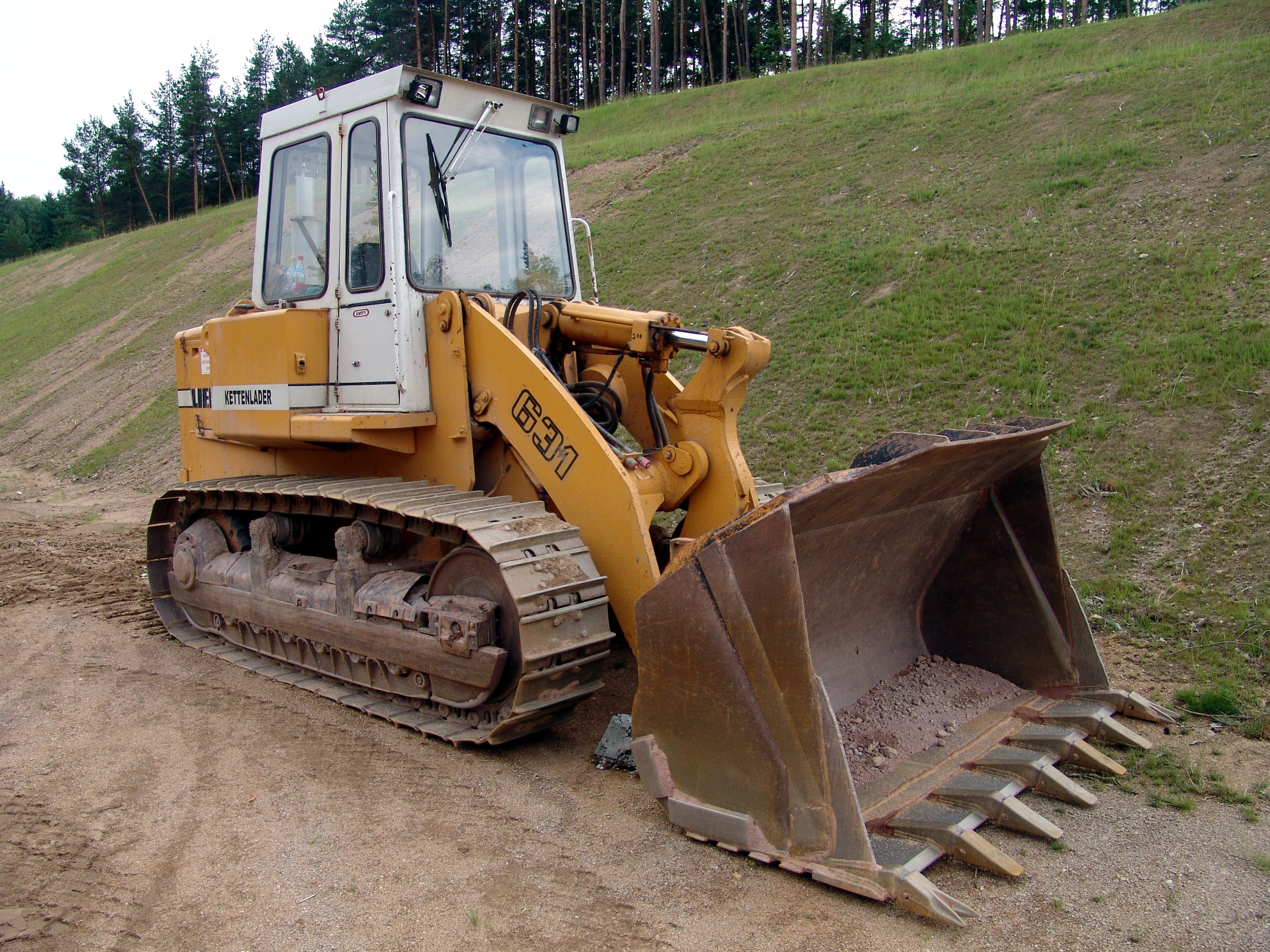
A tracked loader is designed to carry rather than push or rough-grade material

=== Armored bulldozers ===
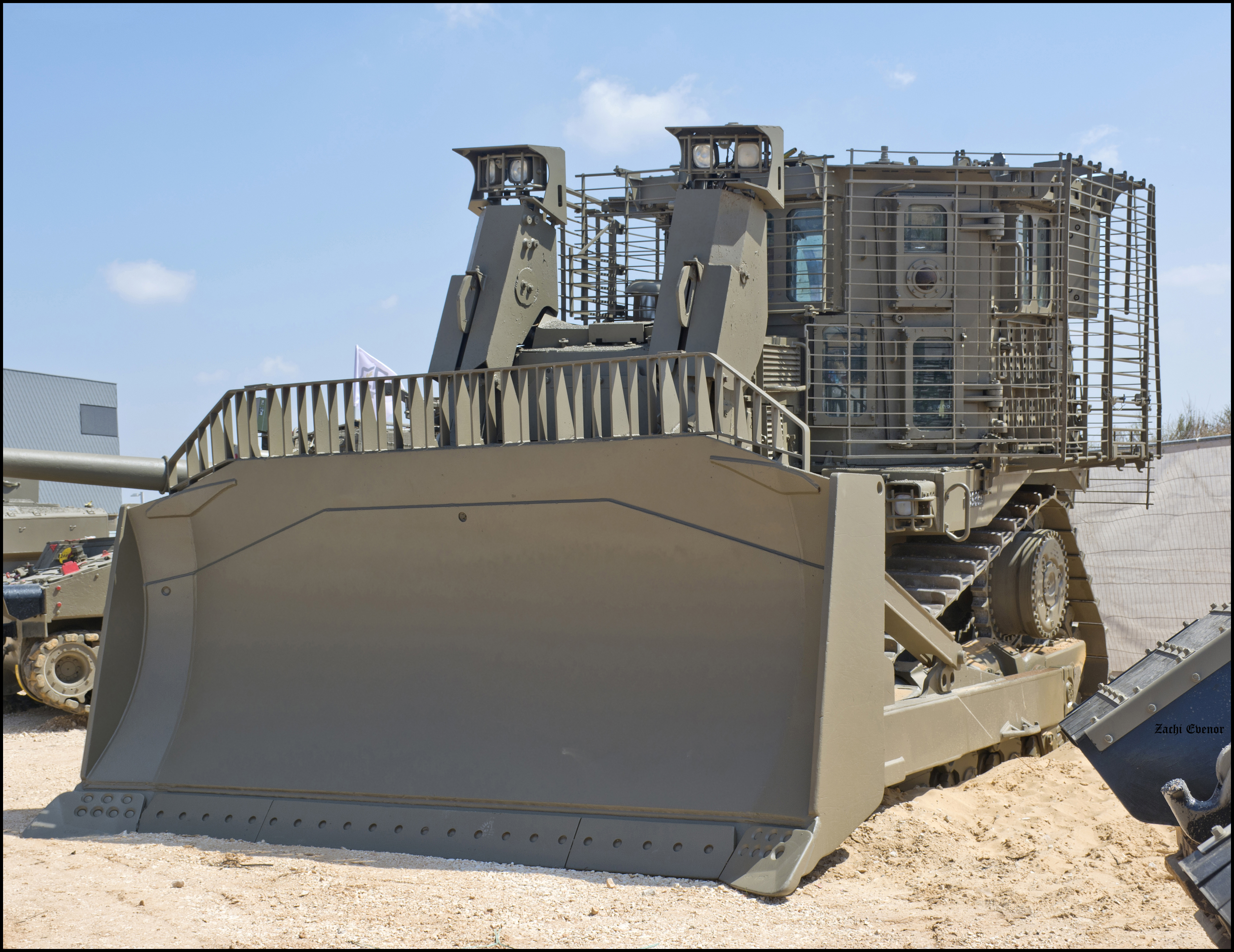
An armored IDF Caterpillar D9 bulldozer used by the Israeli Military

Bulldozers employed for combat-engineering roles are often fitted with armor to protect the driver from firearms and debris, enabling bulldozers to operate in combat zones. The most widely documented use is the Israeli Defense Forces militarized Caterpillar D9, for earth moving, clearing terrain obstacles, opening routes, and detonating explosive charges. The IDF used armored bulldozers extensively during Operation Rainbow where they were used to uproot Gaza Strip smuggling tunnels and destroy residential neighborhoods, water wells and pipes, and agricultural land to expand the military buffer zone along the Philadelphi Route. This use drew criticism against both the use and the suppliers of armoured bulldozers from human-rights organizations such as the EWASH-coalition and Human Rights Watch, the latter of whom urged Caterpillar to cease their sale of bulldozers to the IDF. The use of bulldozers was seen as necessary by Israeli authorities to uproot smuggling tunnels, destroy houses used by Palestinian terrorists, and expand the buffer zone.

Some forces' engineer doctrines differentiate between a low-mobility armoured dozer (LMAD) and a high-mobility armoured dozer (HMAD). The LMAD is dependent on a flatbed to move it to its employment site, whereas the HMAD has a more robust engine and drive system designed to give it road mobility with a moderate range and speed. HMADs, however, normally lack the full cross-country mobility characteristics of a dozer blade-equipped tank or armoured personnel carrier.

Some bulldozers have been fitted with armor by civilian operators to prevent bystanders or police from interfering with the work performed by the bulldozer, as in the case of strikes or demolition of condemned buildings. This has also been done by civilians with a dispute with the authorities, such as Marvin Heemeyer, who outfitted his Komatsu D355A bulldozer with homemade composite armor to then demolish government buildings.

=== Remote-controlled dozers ===
In recent years, innovations in the construction technology have made remote-controlled bulldozers a reality. Now, heavy machinery can be controlled from up to 1,000 feet away. This contributes to the safety of workers on the jobsite, keeping them at a secure distance from potentially dangerous jobs.

The advancement and the ability to control the heavy machinery from afar provides workers with the sufficient control over the dozers to get the job done. Though these machines are still in their early stages, many construction companies are using them successfully.

== Manufacturers ==
Industry statistics based on 2010 production published by Off-Highway Research showed Shantui was the largest producer of bulldozers, making over 10,000 units that year (two in five of the crawler-type dozers made worldwide). The next-largest producer by number of units is Caterpillar Inc., which produced 6,400 units.

Komatsu introduced the D575A in 1981, the D757A-2 in 1991, and the D575A-3 in 2002, which the company touts as the biggest bulldozer in the world.

== Gallery ==
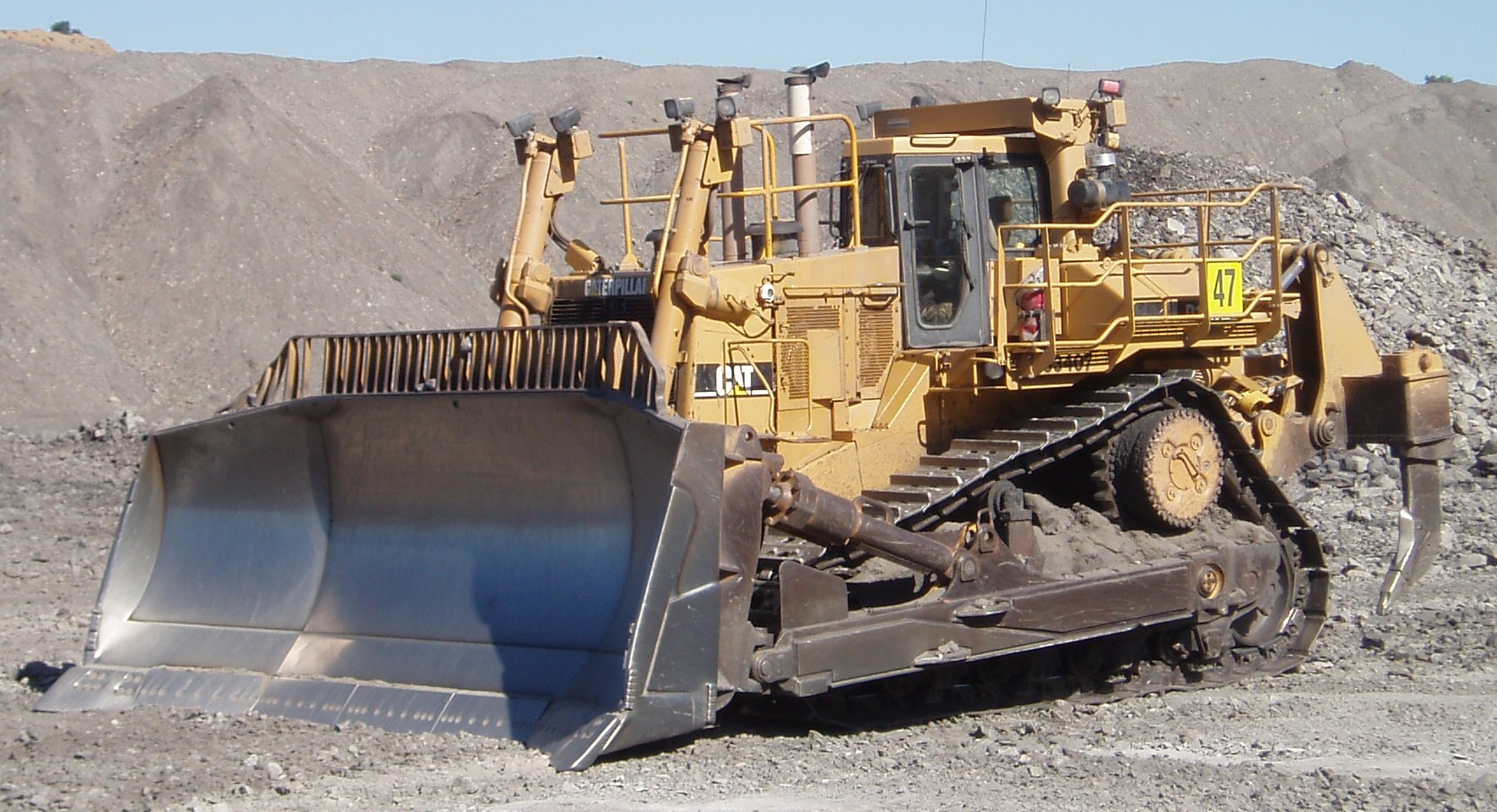
Caterpillar D11N with a double shank ripper

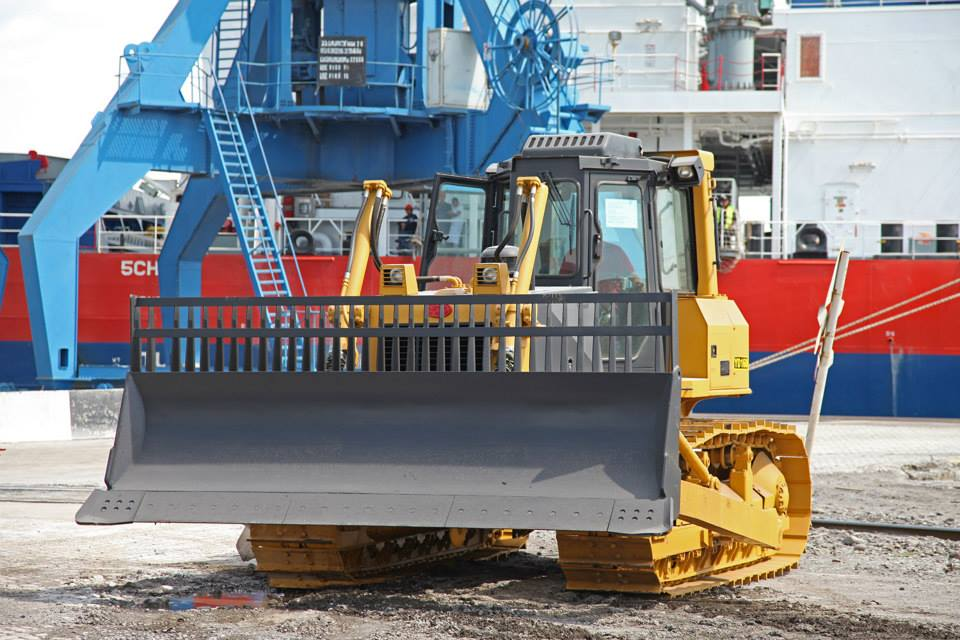
Bulldozer for solid waste management

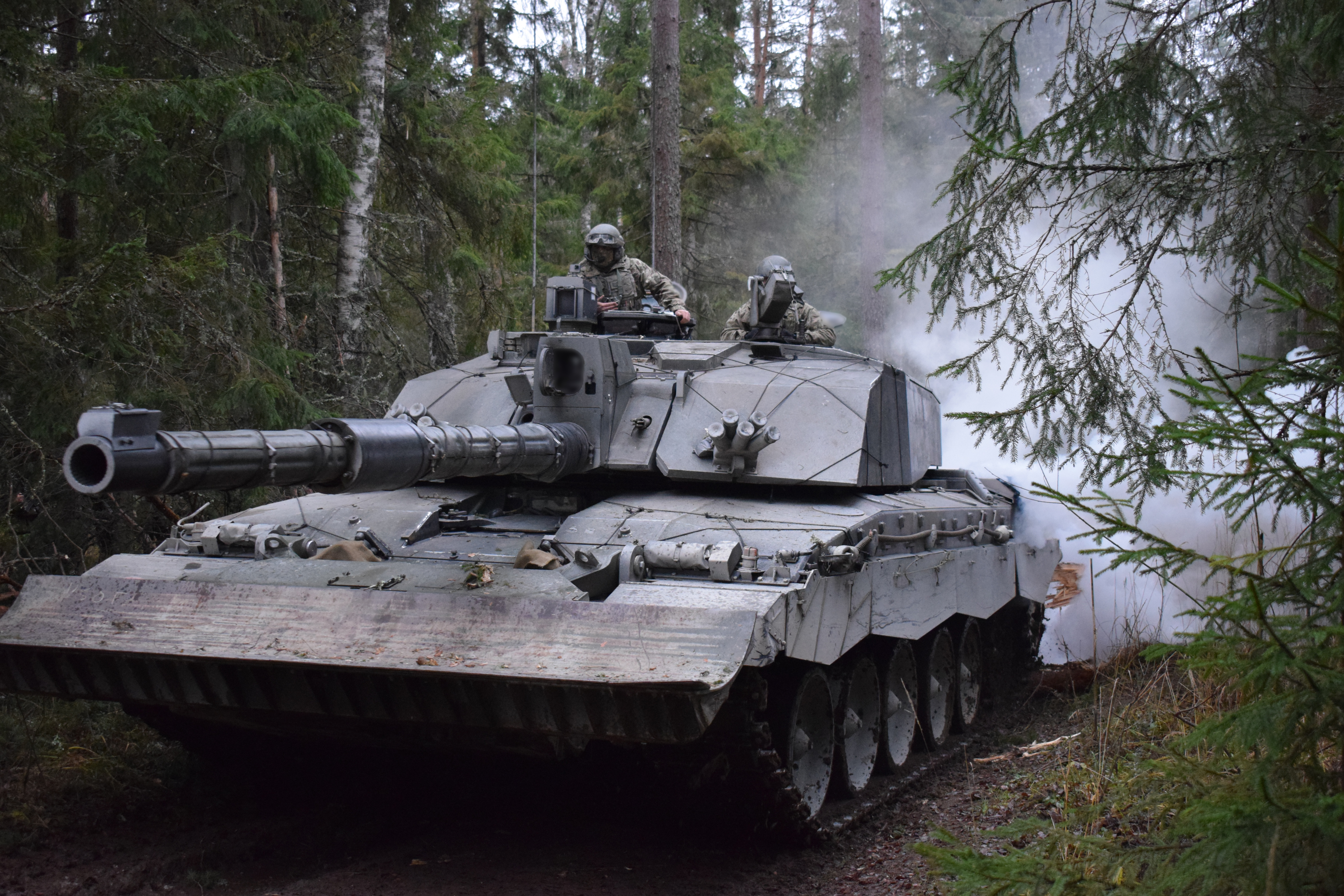
British Challenger 2 tank fitted with pivoting dozer blade, 2020

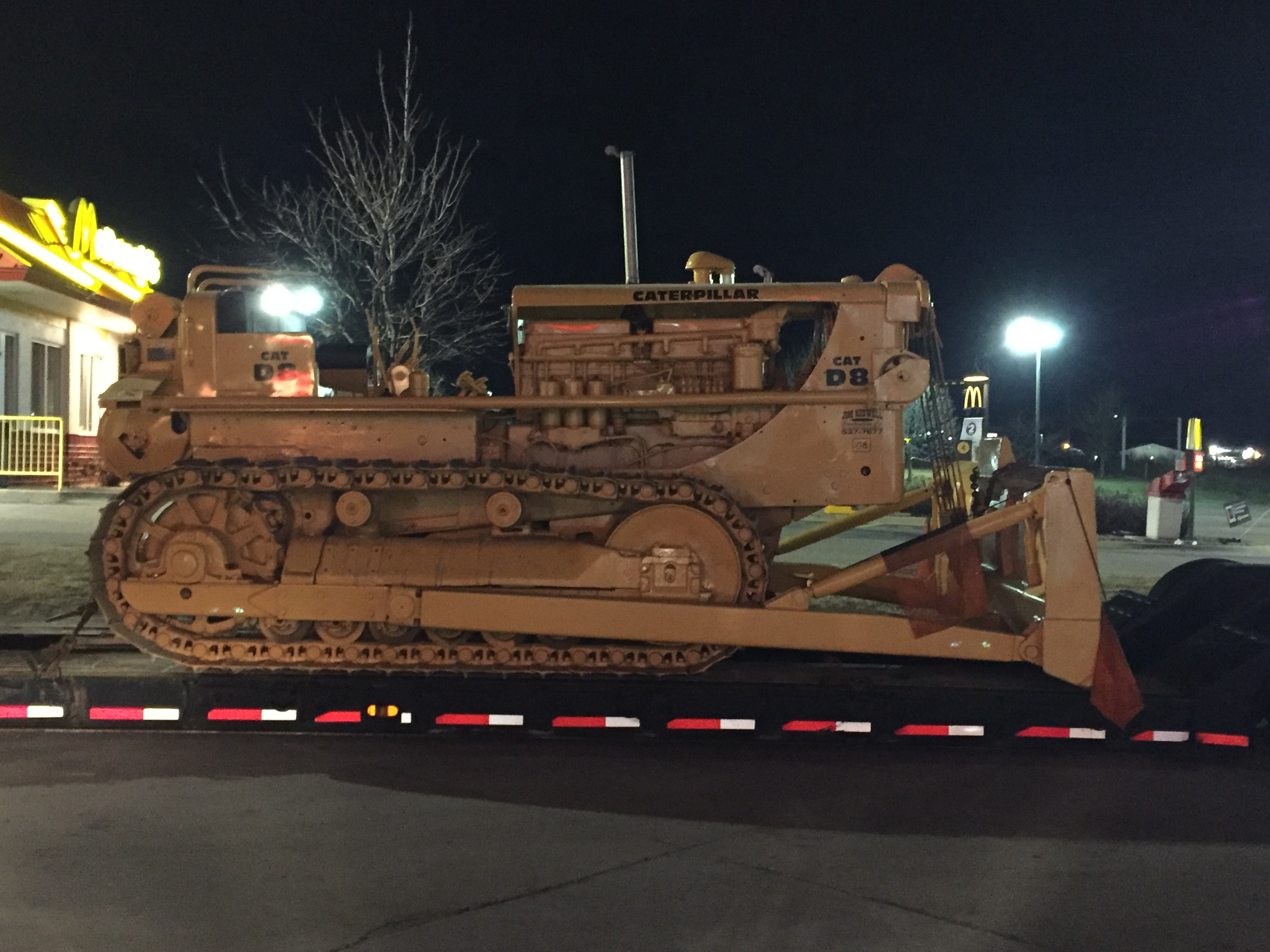
Caterpillar D8 bulldozer without a cab

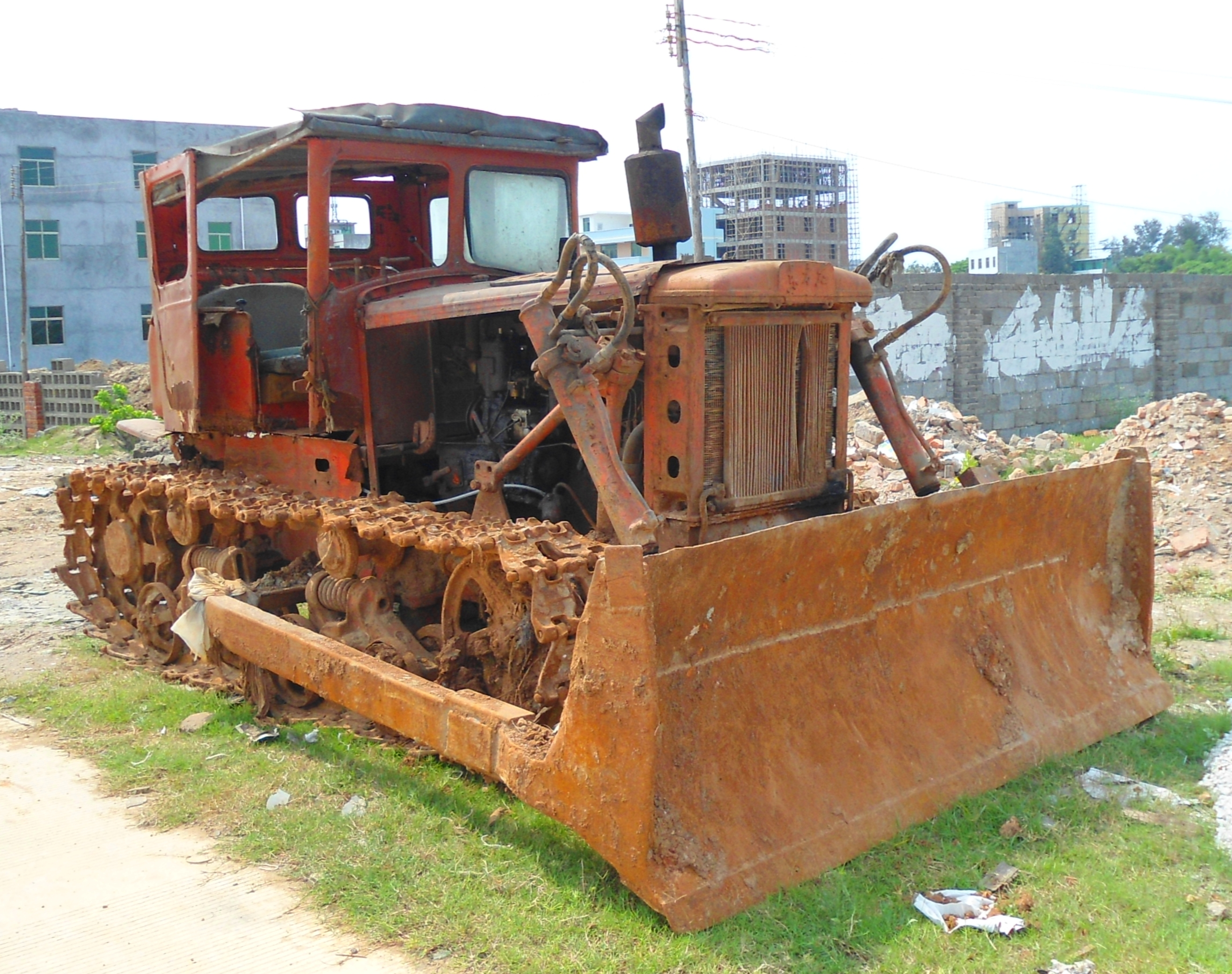
A First Tractor Company bulldozer still operational in 2012 on Xinbu Island, Hainan, China

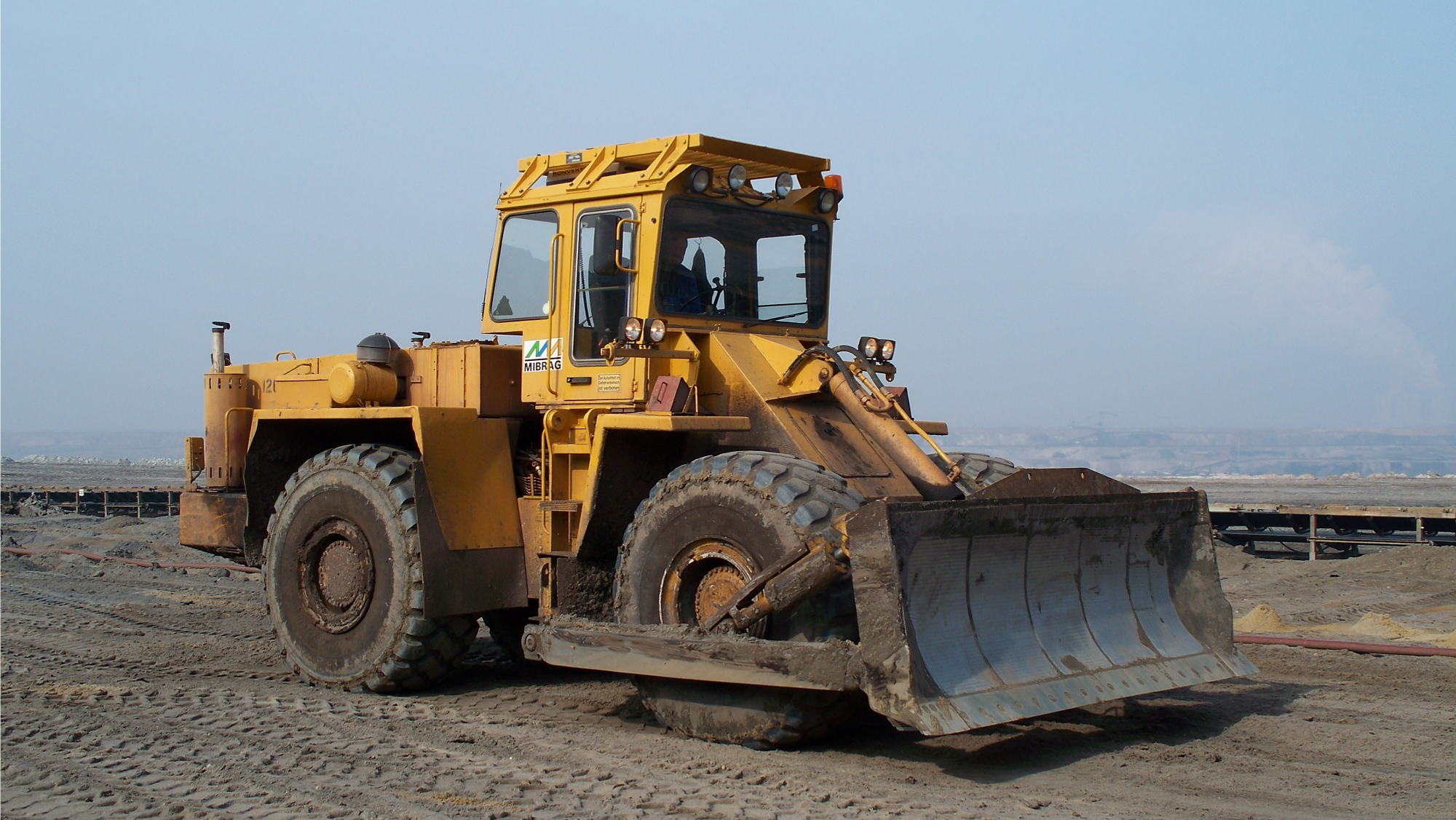
Zettelmeyer ZD 3001 wheeled bulldozer

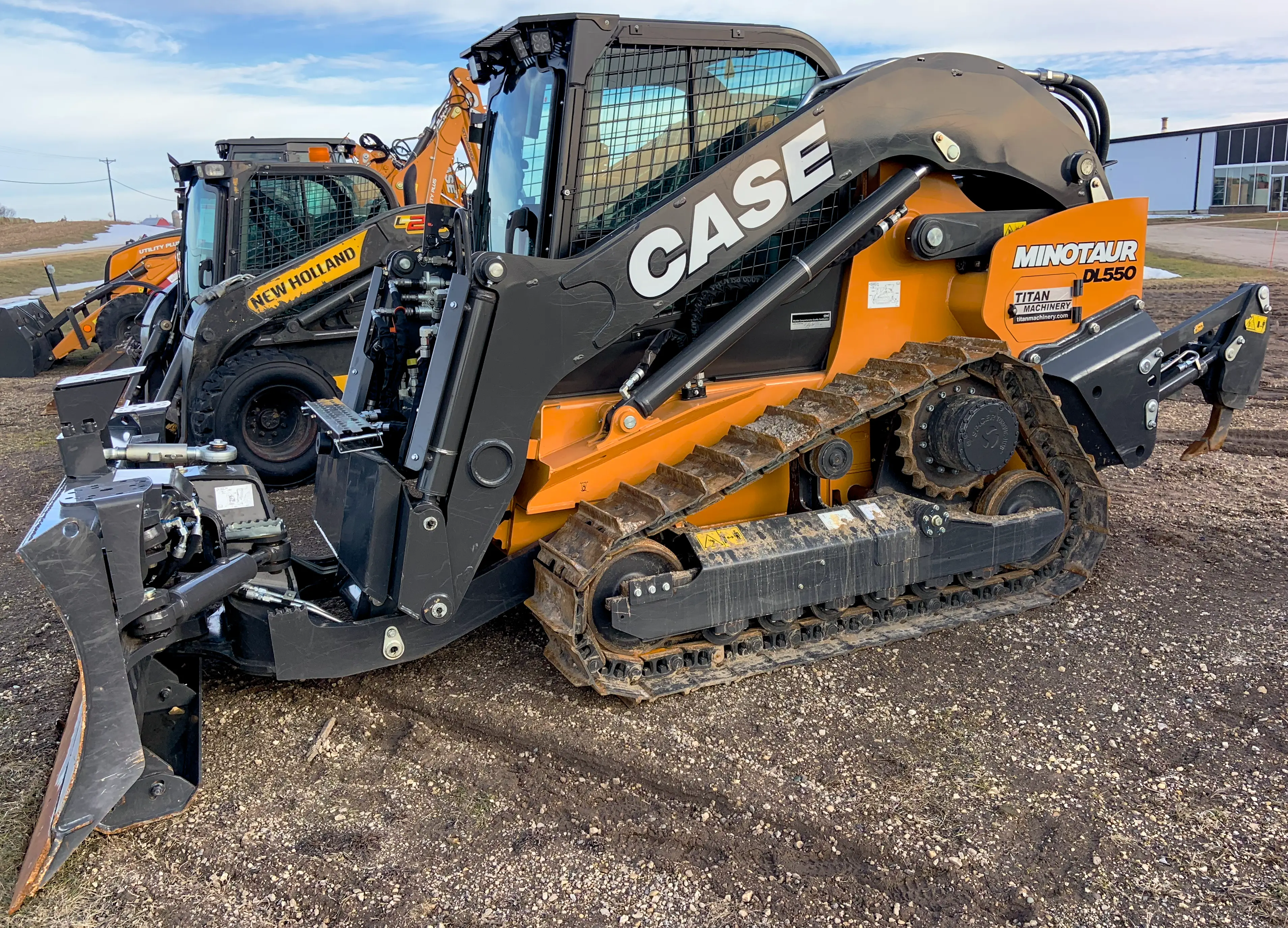
Skid-steer bulldozer

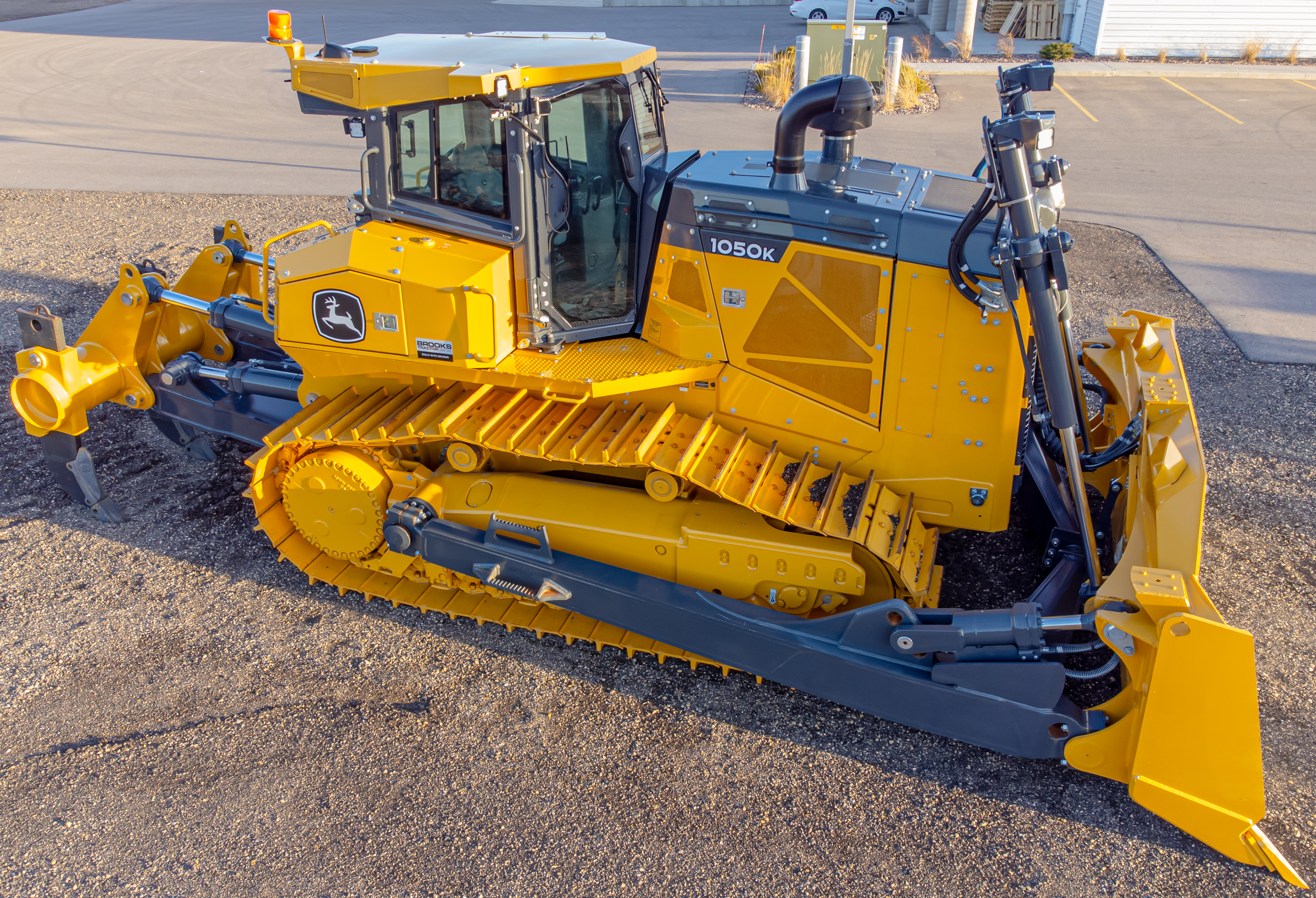
John Deere bulldozer

== See also ==
- Acco super bulldozer, largest bulldozer manufactured
- Athanas for the 'bulldozer shrimp' (from the way it pushes sand about)
- Land scraper or land leveler - an earth moving machine that is pulled behind a tractor rather than pushed.
