= Caterpillar D9 =

Large bulldozer

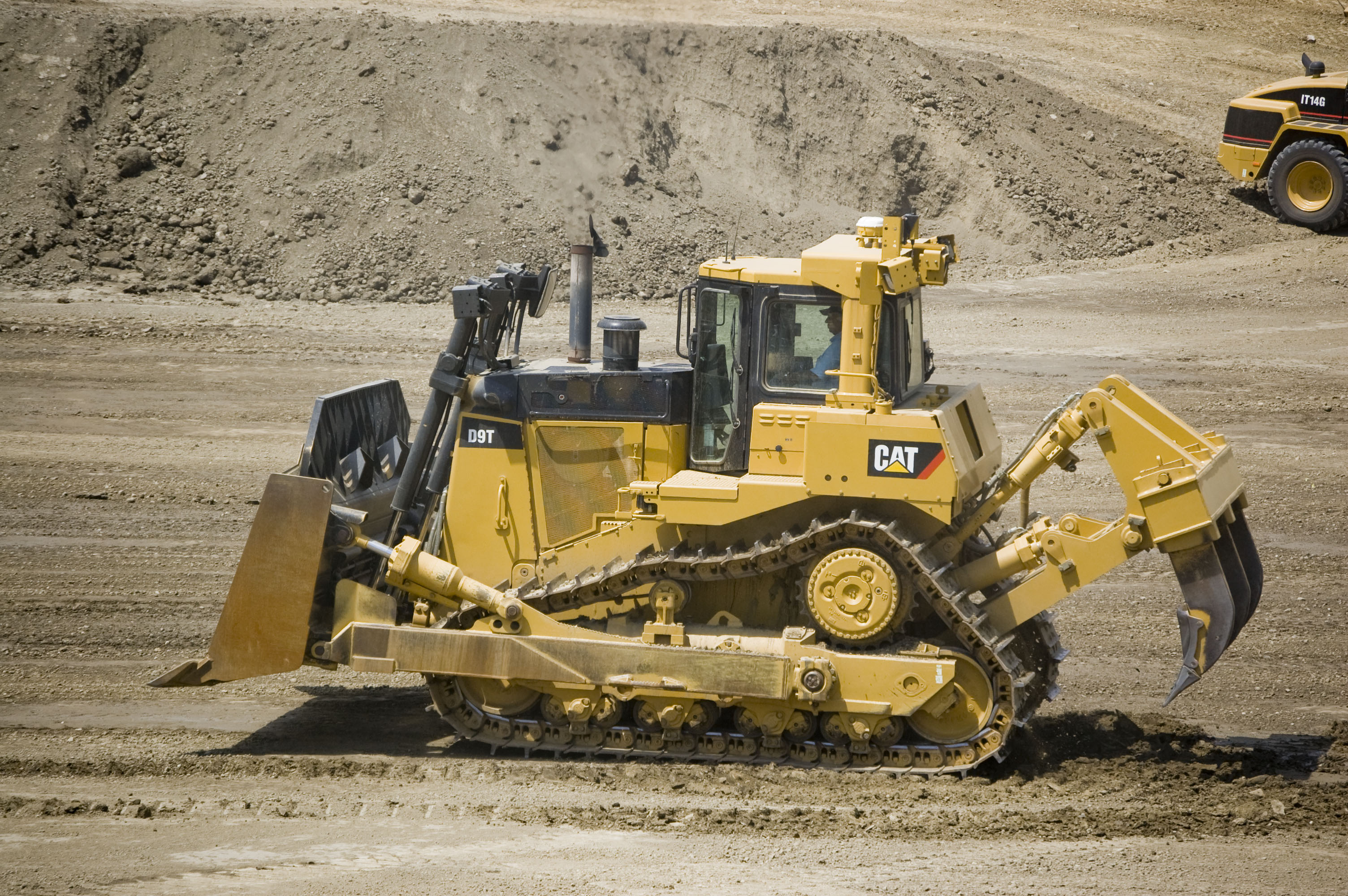
- Caterpillar D9T
- Type: Heavy bulldozer
- Manufacturer: Caterpillar
- Production: 1955 -
- Length: 26.5 ft (8.1 m)
- Width: 14.7 ft (4.5 m) (blade)
- Height: 13 ft (4.0 m)
- Weight: 108,000 lb (48,988 kg)
- Propulsion: Continuous track
- Engine model: CAT C18 ACERT (D9T); 3408 HEUI (D9R)
- Gross power: 464 hp (346 kW) D9T; 474 hp (353 kW) D9R
- Flywheel power: 410 hp (310 kW) D9T; 410 hp (310 kW) D9R; 375 hp (280 kW) D9N; 460 hp (340 kW) D9L
- Drawbar pull: 71.6 tons
- Speed: 7.3 mph (11.7 km/h) Forward; 9.1 mph (14.6 km/h) Reverse
- Blade capacity: 17.7 cu yd (13.5 m^{3}) 9 SU blade; 21.4 cu yd (16.4 m^{3}) 9 U blade

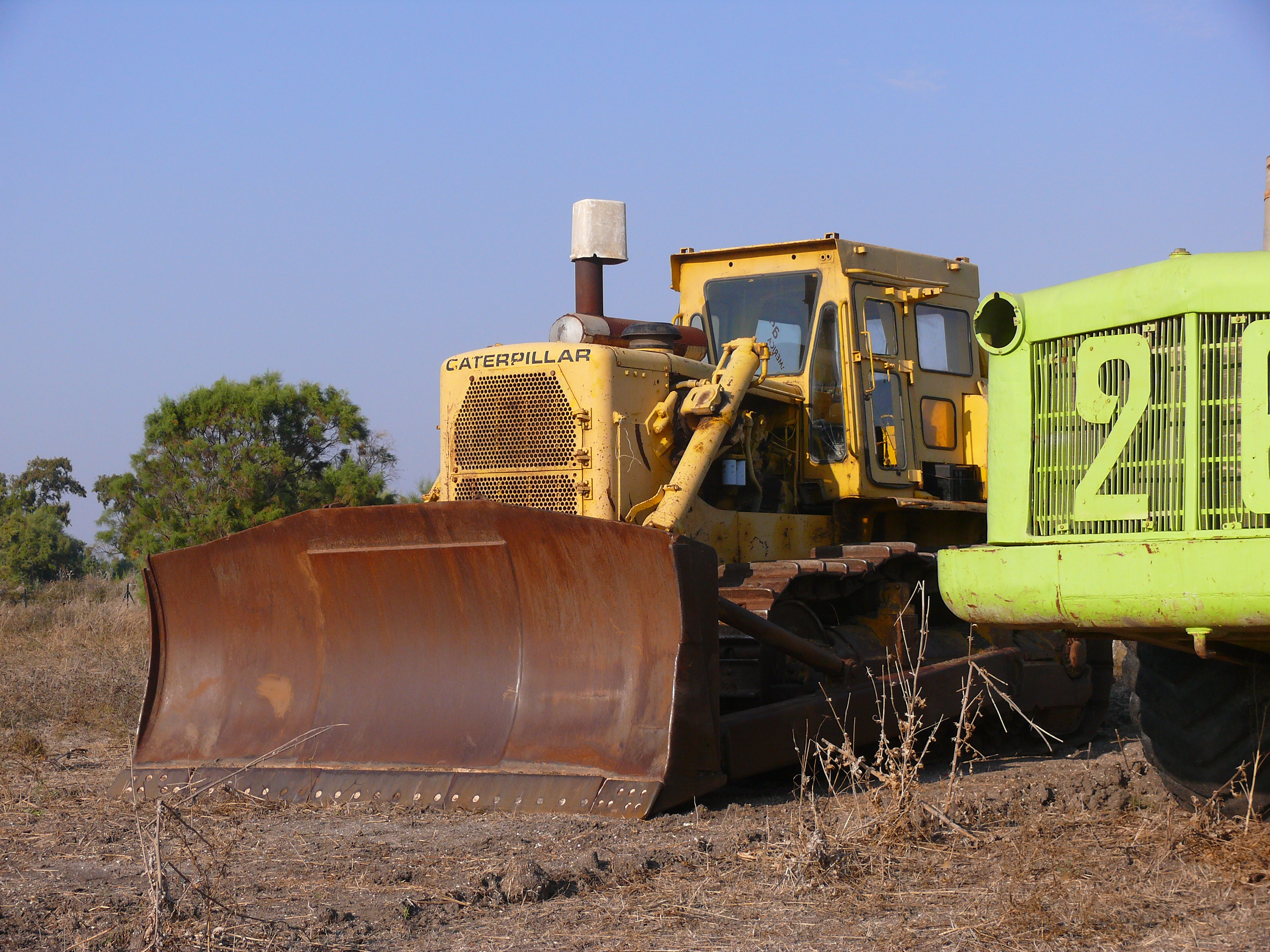
Introduced in 1974, the 410 hp (310 kW) D9H was the last D9 with conventional track drive

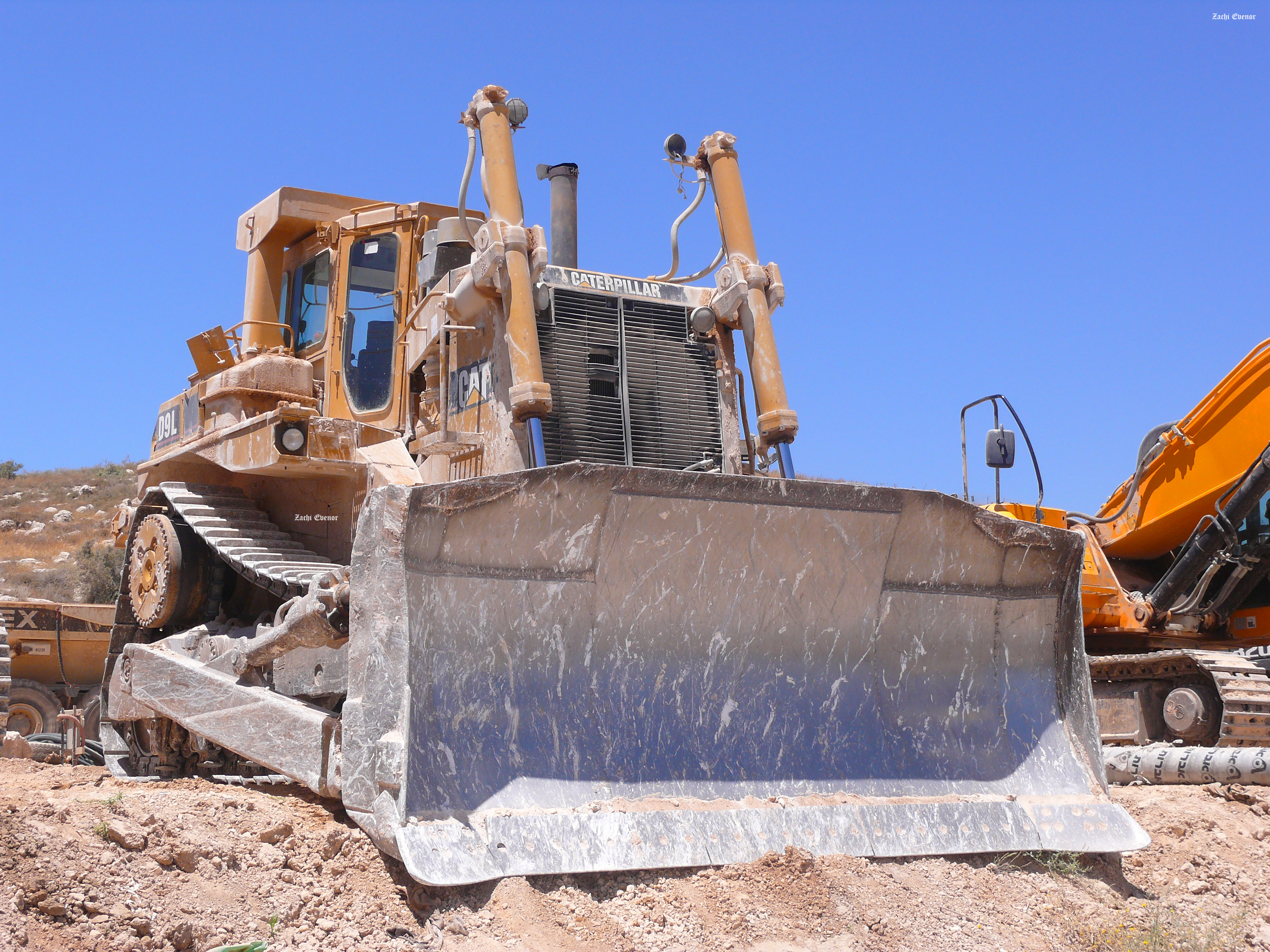
CAT D9L, the first D9 model to employ Caterpillar's "high drive" configuration, which raises the drive sprocket, resulting in elevated ground clearance and a triangular track.

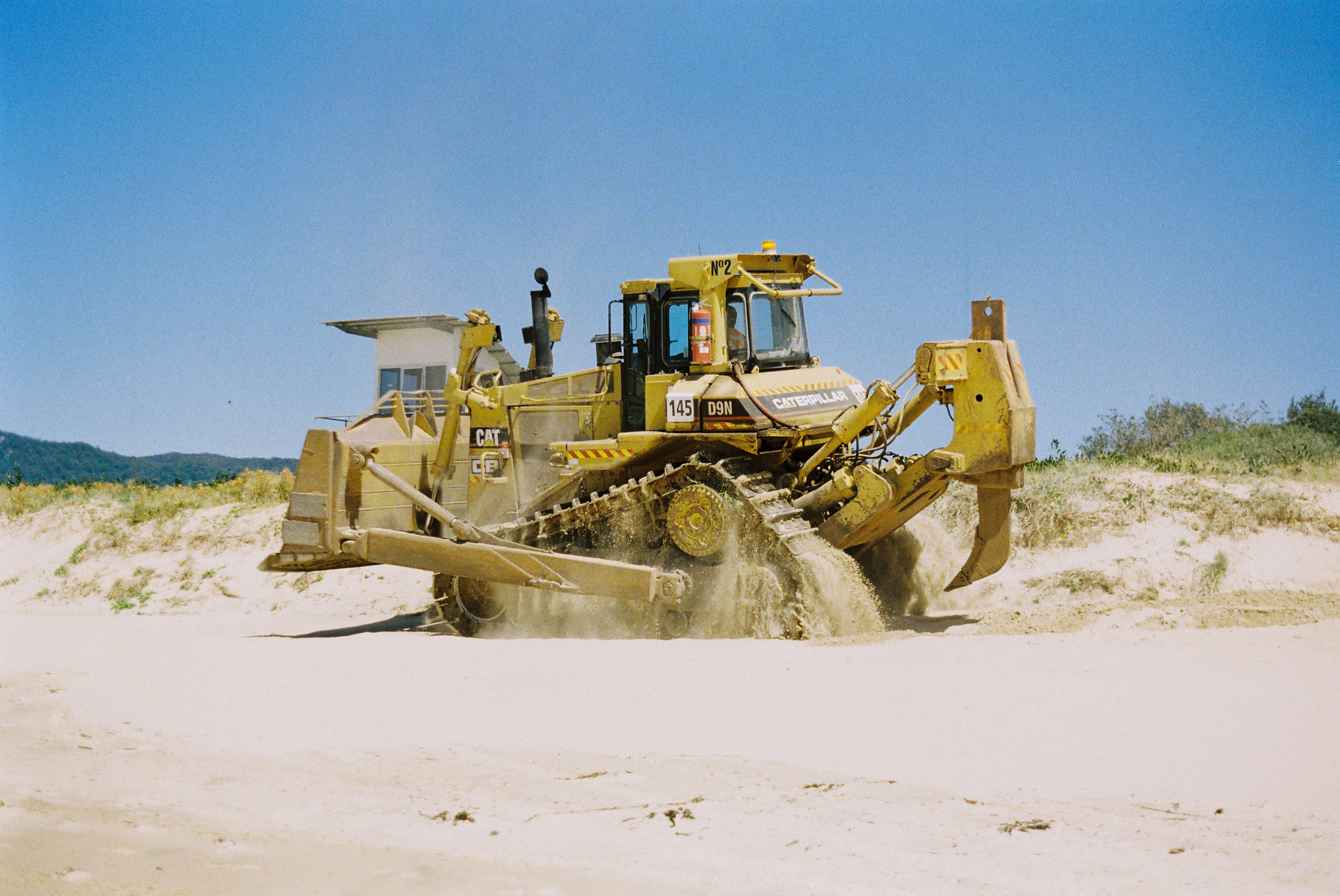
The 370 hp (280 kW) D9N replaced D8L in 1987

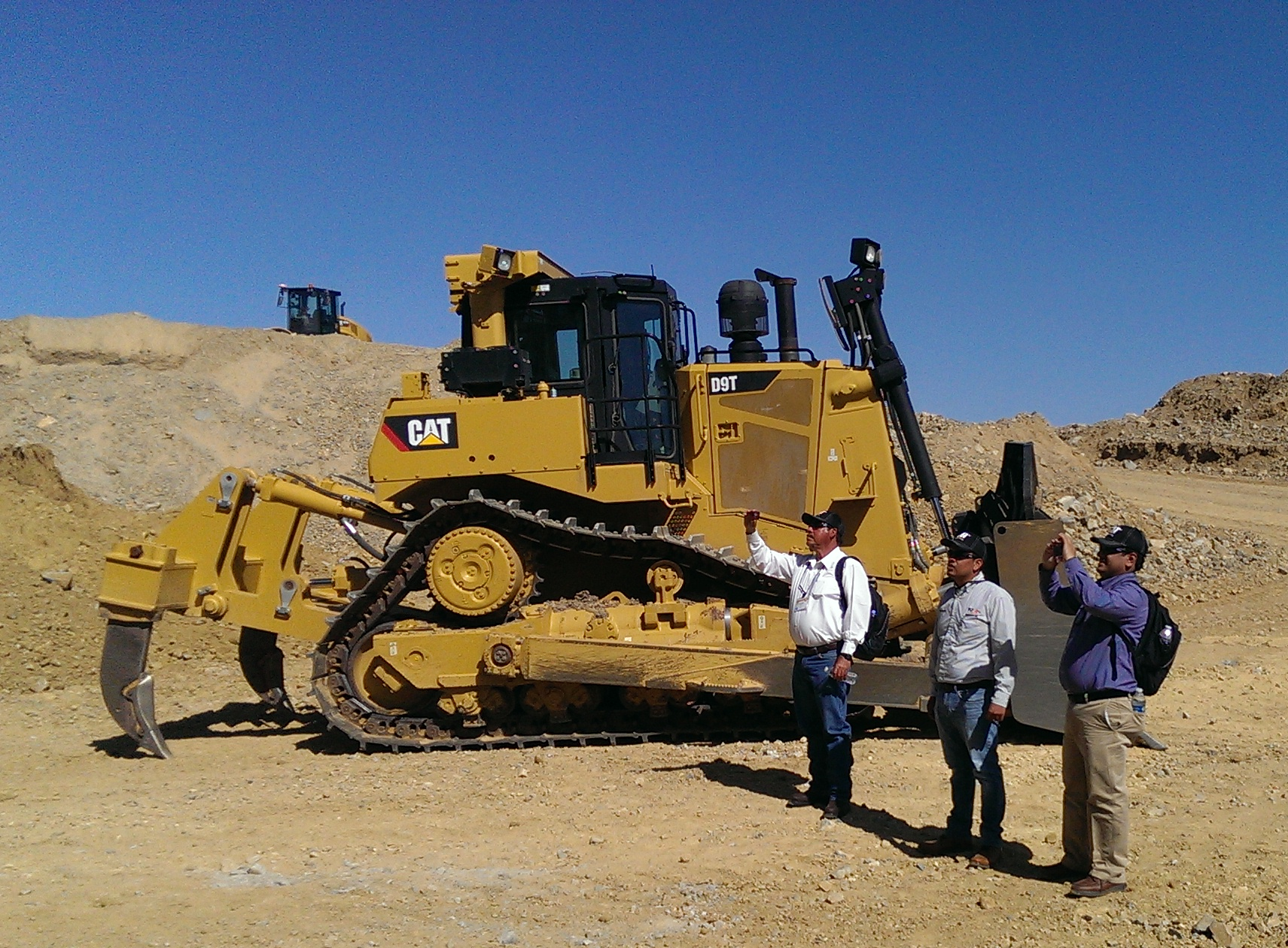
CAT D9T, the current generation of the Caterpillar D9 tracked-type tractor series

The Caterpillar D9 is a large track-type tractor designed and manufactured by Caterpillar Inc. It is usually sold as a bulldozer equipped with a detachable large blade and a rear ripper attachment.

The D9, with 354 kW (474 hp) of gross power and an operating weight of 49 short tons (44 t), is in the upper end of Caterpillar's track-type tractors, which range in size from the D2 69 kW (92 hp), 9 short tons (8.2 t), to the D11 698 kW (935 hp), 104 short tons (94 t).

Its size, durability, reliability, and low operating costs have made the D9 one of the most popular large track-type tractors in the world.

As the size, power, and weight of the larger track-type tractors dictate that they are used primarily for major projects, the D9 is most commonly found in construction, demolition, forestry, mining, waste, and quarry operations.

== Engineering and technical description ==
The D9 is a series of heavy tracked-type tractors, carried on continuous tracks and usually used as bulldozers. The series began in 1954 with a prototype tractor called the D9X. Ten D9X prototype models were built in 1954. In 1955, the 286 hp (213 kW) D9 was introduced to compete against the more powerful Euclid TC-12. The D9 came equipped with a 1,473 cid D353, which powered the D9 until the 1980 introduction of the D9L. In 1956, the D9 had its engine power raised to 320 hp (240 kW). The new 335 hp (250 kW) D9E replaced that model in 1959. Two years later, the legendary 385 hp (287 kW) D9G was introduced; it remained in production for 13 years; it became the main crawler on many job sites, testifying to its sturdiness and design.

In 1965, West Coast businessman Buster Peterson hooked up a pair of D9Gs to pushload the largest wheel tractor scrapers built. In 1968, Caterpillar bought the rights to this concept, thus the 770 hp (570 kW) DD9G was created (DD stands for Dual D9G). Peterson also built the first SxS D9G, which has two D9Gs side-by-side, pushing a 24-foot (7.3 m)-wide bulldozer blade.

In 1969, Caterpillar introduced this new SxS D9G. In 1974, the improved 410 hp (310 kW) D9H was introduced to replace the D9G. The D9H is still the most powerful conventional track-type tractor in company history. The DD9H and the SxS D9H soon followed.

In 1980, the 460 hp (340 kW) D9L was introduced. The unit featured the same new type of elevated drive sprocket undercarriage as had been introduced on the larger D10 in 1977. (Note: The D10, and the elevated sprocket drive, was developed over several years from 1973 before its commercial debut.) The new undercarriage design reduced strain and shock loads on the final drives and gave the "belly pan" more ground clearance. The elevated-drive-sprocket undercarriage is a modular design. To repair the machines, one breaks down the tracks and pulls the drive sprockets out. As a result, one can pull the powershift transmission out of the rear.

The D9L was replaced by the 520 hp (390 kW) D10N in 1987. The 370 hp (280 kW) D9N replaced D8L in 1987 (this was due to a model number/size adjustment by Caterpillar in their larger bulldozer lineup at the time, allowing them to introduce a smaller D8N model below the larger D8L size). Due to the model adjustment, the D9L is the most powerful D9 in history, with a flywheel power of 460 hp (340 kW). The D9L is also the heaviest D9 in history at 130,000 pounds (59,000 kg).

In 1988, Caterpillar produced their 25,000th elevated-drive-sprocket track-type tractor, a D9N. The 405 hp (302 kW) D9R replaced the D9N in 1996. The 410 hp (310 kW) D9T replaced the D9R in 2004. The main difference between the D9T and the D9R is the installment of the new Cat C18 ACERT inline-six engine in the D9T vs the V8 3408 HEUI in the D9R. The D9R has clutch and brake steering, while the D9T has differential steering. The D9T has a low-emissions ACERT diesel engine. The current model is the D9 (no letter); however, older models such as the D9T, D9R, D9N, and D9L are still commonly used. The L, N, R, and T models of the D9 are visually very similar, differing primarily in the design of their internal systems.

== Tools ==
The D9's primary working tools are the blade, affixed to the front and controlled by four hydraulic cylinders, and an optional ripper in the rear.

The blade is mainly intended for earthmoving and bulk material handling: pushing up sand, soil, and rubble. It also can be used to push other heavy equipment such as earthmoving scraper pans, and in military applications, aid main battle tanks. The dozer blade usually has three variants:

- A straight blade ("S-blade") is short and has no lateral curve, with no side wings, and can be used for fine grading.
- A universal blade ("U-blade") is tall and very curved, and has large side wings to carry more material.
- A "S-U" combination blade is shorter, has less curvature, and has smaller side wings. This blade is typically used for pushing piles of large rocks, such as at a quarry.

The rear ripper is intended for use in loosening rocky ground and ripping out larger stones. It can also break frozen ground and excavate small ditches. The ripper can be replaced with a multi-shank ripper, allowing the bulldozer to comb the ground.

Like many other bulldozers, the D9 can be fitted with other devices, such as mine plows for clearing minefields.

== Military applications ==
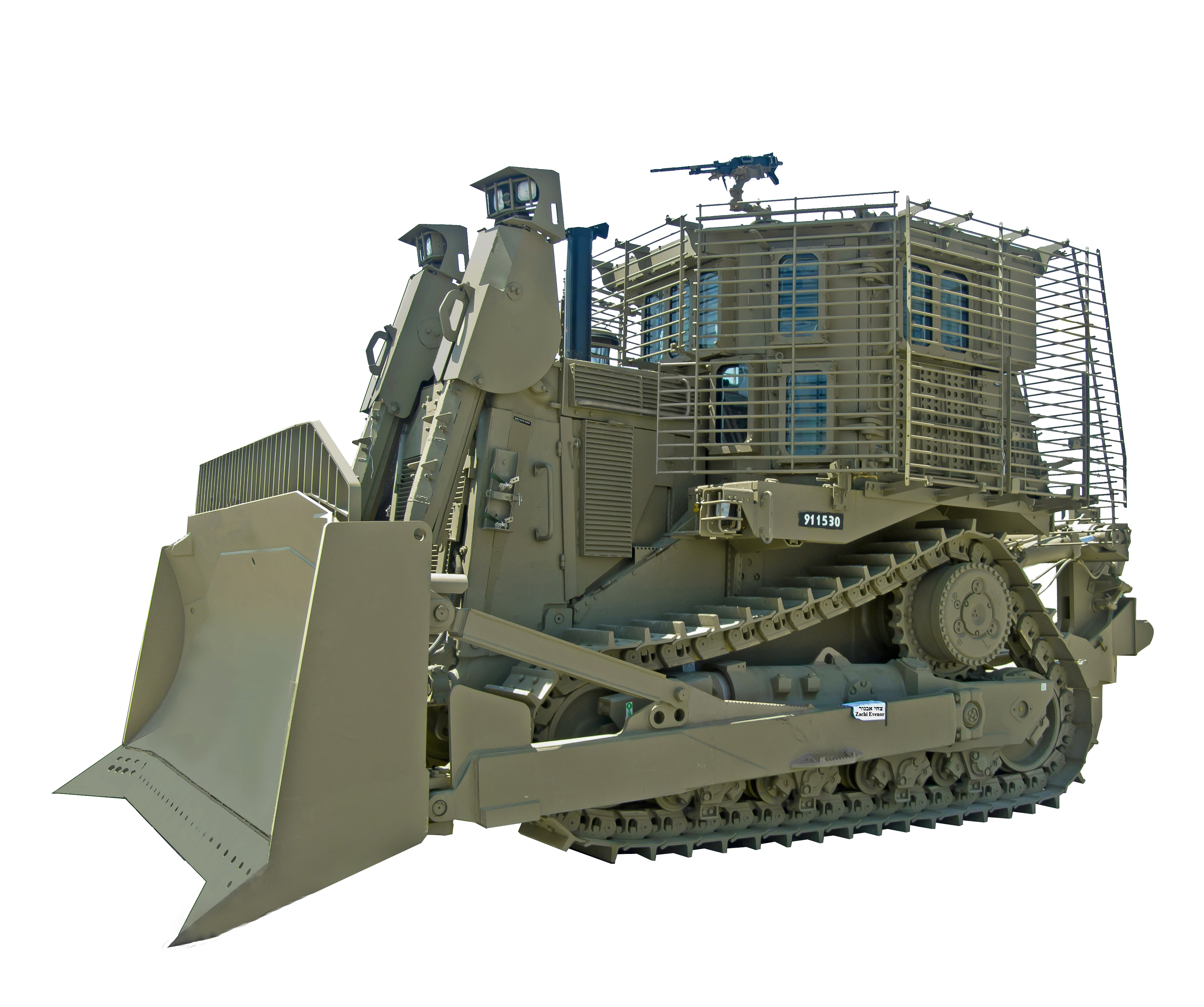
An armored IDF Caterpillar D9R bulldozer, nicknamed "דובי" (Teddy bear) in Israel. Its armor allows it to work under heavy fire.

Caterpillar Inc. does not manufacture a military version of the D9. However, the attributes that make the D9 popular for major construction projects make it desirable for certain military applications.

The US Army used D9 bulldozers to clear forest in the Vietnam War, but after the war they were replaced with smaller and cheaper Caterpillar D7G bulldozers. D7G bulldozers are still very common in US combat engineering battalions; currently the US Army fields around 1300 D7r’s that are a combination of armored and non armored. A series of suggestions have been made to replace the lighter D7Gs with the newer and more heavily armored D9s.

The Israel Defense Forces (IDF) have used the D9 since it was introduced. The armored IDF Caterpillar D9 was introduced in 1986 on the D9L. Fitted with an Israeli-developed vehicle armor kit, and modified variously by the Israel Defense Forces, Israeli Military Industries and Israel Aerospace Industries, it has proven particularly effective.

IDF D9 bulldozers were used during the Second Intifada (2000–2005) to demolish Palestinian properties and clear improvised explosive devices. The Israeli armor provides protection from small arms and explosives, and the bulldozers were used the Battle of Jenin 2002 during Operation Defensive Shield. A 2003 incident involving an IDF D9, in which a 23-year-old American activist was killed, resulted in a lawsuit brought against Caterpillar, Inc. in the United States. The court dismissed the case on grounds that it was outside their jurisdiction, and that Israeli tort law was a sufficient avenue to pursue remedies.

The D9 remains one of the main combat engineering tools of the IDF, which currently deploys the D9L, D9N, D9R, and D9T. Most of the IDF's D9 fleet today are composed of the D9R with slat armor.

A similarly modified armored D9 was also used by KBR in Iraq.

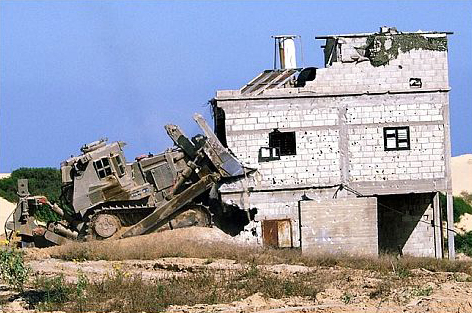
IDF Caterpillar D9L razing a Palestinian house

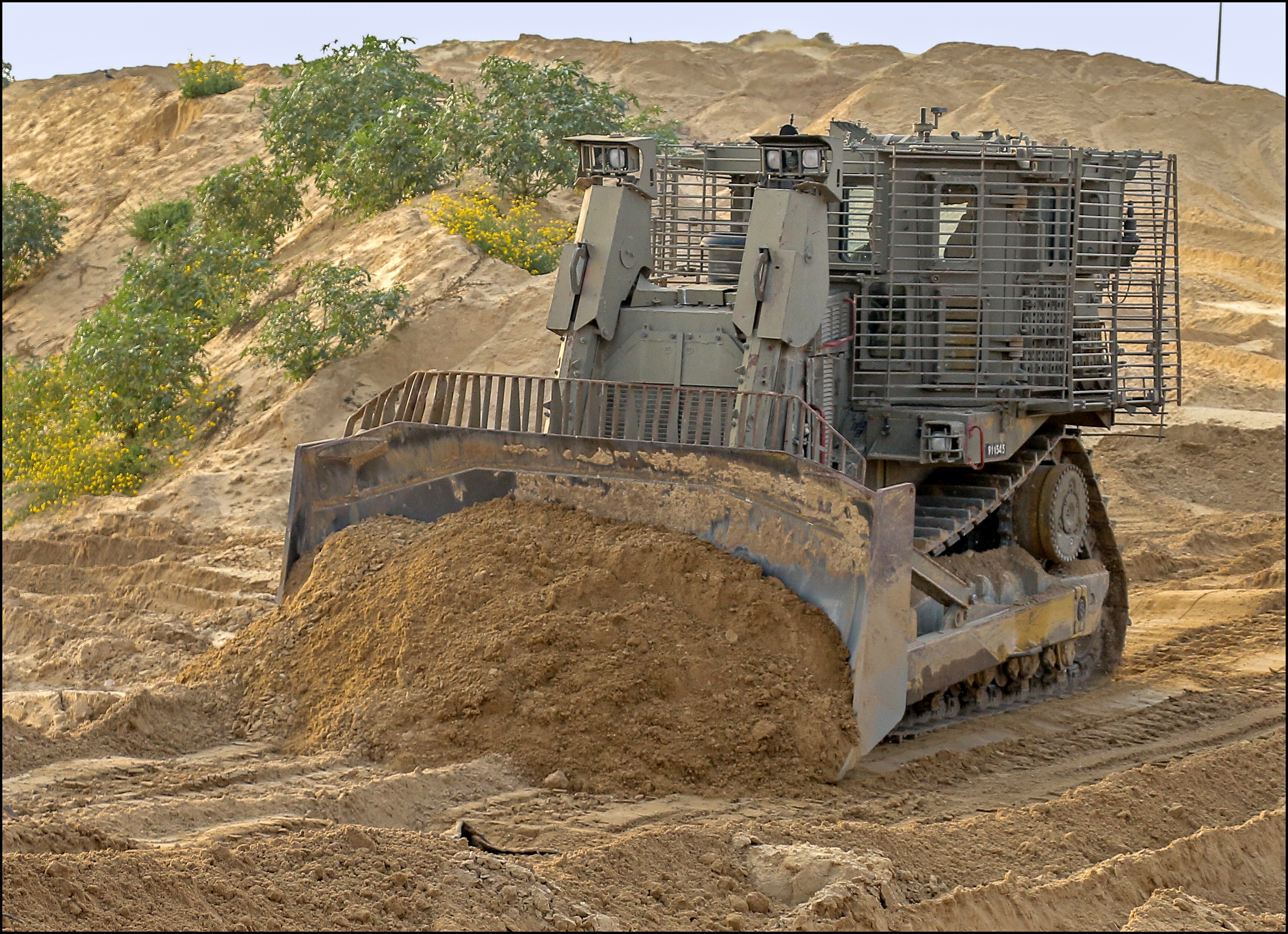
IDF Caterpillar D9R pushing soil for an earthworks.

== See also ==
- Rome plow
- Killdozer! (film)
