= Geoffrey Álvarez =

British-Nicaraguan composer and conductor

Geoffrey Álvarez D.Phil
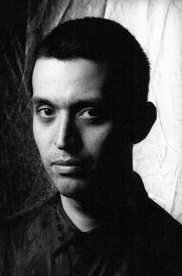
- Born: 1961 (age 64–65); London, United Kingdom
- Occupations: conductor; writer; Librettist
- Era: Classical
- Known for: Inventor of Gravesian Analysis

Geoffrey Álvarez is a British/Nicaraguan composer and conductor based in Sunderland. He chairs the annual international composition competition run by the Alvarez Chamber Orchestra. He is also a writer on music and inventor of Gravesian Analysis.

== Education and work ==
Alvarez studied composition privately with Giles Swayne, then with Paul Patterson at the Royal Academy of Music as a Leverhulme scholar, and later at the University of York with David Blake and Richard Orton, where he obtained a D.Phil.

Some of his papers are published in Gravesiana: The Journal of the Robert Graves Society, whilst he has contributed several articles for Tempo on the work of composers such as Michael Finnissy and Alexander Goehr's Arianna. His own work (his setting of Psalm XXIII in Hebrew) was reviewed in the same publication by Mark R. Taylor.

His compositions range from the wind quintet The Travelling Musicians, performed by the Harlequin Wind Quintet in the Purcell Room in 2001 to seven symphonies and numerous operas including a collaboration with poet Ruth Fainlight commissioned by the Garden Venture of the Royal Opera House: The European Story.

Encouraged by an invitation by Luciano Berio to Florence, he dedicated a piano concerto to the Italian master. Later, in November 2006, Geoffrey Alvarez returned from Poland as a prize-winning finalist and soloist with the Arthur Rubenstein Łódź Philharmonic Orchestra in the Final of the Tansman 6th International Competition of Musical Personalities, Composers Competition, Łódź 2006 (adjudicated by Krauze, Holliger, Penderecki and Nyman) performing a chamber version of this concerto.

Álvarez has recently had three chamber music commissions from FILUM Musikschule, Filderstadt, Germany; the performances of two of these were awarded second prize in the finals of the Bundeswettbewerb Jugend musiziert 2023. His Rhapsody in Blue and Yellow for cello and bayan (Russian Button Accordion) virtuoso Ukrainian Tatyana Balyana was premiered by this artist in a Ukrainian benefit concert in Hanover's Marktkirche in 2025. Other projects include a radio opera in collaboration with Maltese playwright Joseph Vella Bondin Dawk li fuq l-iġfna jbaħħru (They that go down to the sea) and a UNESCO supported CD recording of his Draco for wind ensemble and Hammond organ by Bóreas Ventus in Granada, Spain. He has recently finished a nine-hour dream in five operas based on the beliefs of the Kogi of Colombia: La profecía última del rey, a work described by opera director Keith Warner as ‘fresh, original and exciting - a piece that MUST be done’.

=== Recordings ===
- Hölderlinfenster
- Symphonies & Sundries: the Complete Organ Music of Geoffrey Álvarez

== Selected works ==
=== Music ===
- Montage for Clarinet, Horn & Orchestra (1979)
- Symphony No. 1 (1980)
- TheTell-Tale Heart (Opera) (1981–3)
- Brass Etchings (1983)
- Oboe Concerto (1984–85)
- Three Madrigals for Chamber Choir (1986–8)
- Lament in Memoriam Anderson (1987)
- Hied and Seek for Soprano, Basson and Live Electronics (1987)
- Triptych for Soloists, double choir and orchestra (1989)
- Kerbcrawling for chamber ensemble (1989)
- String Quartet (1990)
- Sept Piece for Horn and Piano (1990)
- Obsessions for Flute Viola and Harp (1990)
- Oboe Quartet (1991)
- Emisori Rites, Chamber Opera for Eight Performers (1991)
- Songs My Parrot Taught Me (1992)
- The European Story, Opera (1992)
- Bastien and Bastienne Arias - Mozart, Recitatives - Geoffrey Alvarez (1993)
- The Laughing Lotus for Woodwind Quintet (1997)
- Symphony No. 2: The Five Seasons (1998)
- The Travelling Musicians a Pantomime for Wind Quintet (1999–2000)
- Psalm XXIII for soprano and piano (2000)
- My Last Muse for bass and orchestra (2000)
- Concertino: for piano and chamber orchestra (2001)
- El Duende: for tenor and piano (2002)
- Tríptico Nicaragüense: for tenor and piano
- Teares or Lamentations: Six Sundry Sights: for 10 course lute
- Magnificat: for SATB chorus (2004)
- The Old Jewish Cemetery in Lodz (2008)
- Fantasia on Tansman's Last Theme: Alla Polacca (2008)
- Symphony No. 3: El tempano (2008)
- Symphony No. 4: the Breath of Life, for thirteen winds (2009)
- Missa Regina Elissa: for chorus, timpani, organ and strings (2009)
- The Triple Goddess, Concerto Grosso for Flute, Violin, Harp and Chamber Orchestra (2009)
- Symphony No. 5: Ceridwen's Cauldron for three harps and two pianos (2010)
- Symphony No 7: Hyperborea (2010)
- Hölderlinfenster, song cycle for high voice and piano (2013)
- St Paul's Shipwreck, Organ Symphony for organ and brass ensemble (2015)
- A Sunderland Symphony, Symphony for soloists, chorus, organ and orchestra (2023)

Works published by Cayambis Music Press

== Awards and honours ==
- Eric Coates Composition Prize, Royal Academy of Music, 1979
- Josiah Parker Composition Prize, Royal Academy of Music, 1980
- Royal Overseas League 'Bernard Shore' Composition Award 1990.
- Recommended work: I International Uuno Klami Composition Competition 2003–2004
- Fourth Prize in The Tansman 6th International Competition of Musical Personalities, Composers Competition, Łódź 2006
