= Cobano Airport =

Airport in Costa Rica

- IATA: ACO; ICAO: MRAF

Summary
- Serves: Cóbano, Puntarenas, Costa Rica
- Coordinates: 9°41′32″N 85°05′45″W
- Website: www.cobanoairport.com
- Interactive map of Cobano Airport

Cobano Airport (IATA: ACO) is an airport in Cóbano, Costa Rica. It is served regularly by Costa Rica Green Airways from San José, and SANSA from Liberia and San José. The airport was opened in August 2023 and scheduled services started in the following October.
