= The Airline Cooperative =

International trade association

- Abbreviation: ACO
- Formation: 1 July 2012
- Type: International trade association
- Headquarters: Seefeldstraße 69, Zürich, Switzerland
- Members: 147 International Airlines (2015)
- Website: www.airlinecoop.org

The Airline Cooperative (ACO) is a membership organisation formed by a broad group of International Airlines, with the structure of a Cooperative Society. The pivotal aim of the Cooperative is to share non-competitive information, and work together to increase awareness of relevant safety and security concerns, improve efficiency, reduce costs, learn, and grow.

As of March 2015, there were 147 airlines in the group. These airlines are located in 66 countries worldwide, at 116 airport base locations.

== Differences from traditional trade associations ==
The Airline Cooperative is differentiated from existing airline groups like IATA, AEA, ERA, and so on, in that these are all primarily acting as trade associations, with a vertical structure that focuses on Political Lobbying at the top. The Airline Cooperative instead focuses on peer-to-peer communication, with Airlines talking directly to each other on key focus areas such as Security, Flight Operations, Route information, Large-scale ATC and Weather events, Emergency Response Planning, and Ground Handling issues.

== History ==
The initial members of The Airline Cooperative came together in 2012, to run a beta-test involving sharing information across the Flight Operations departments of the member airlines.

In 2014, the group had expanded to 80 member airlines.

In 2015, the group reached 140 member airlines and continues to grow.

== Members ==
In March 2015, a published map showed there to be:
- 147 Airline members worldwide
- 66 countries with Airline Cooperative airline members
- 116 Airport bases with airlines taking part in the Cooperative
