= Alvarez Chamber Orchestra =

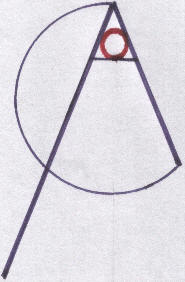

Background information
- Also known as: ACO
- Origin: London, UK
- Genres: Contemporary
- Occupation: Chamber orchestra
- Years active: 1979–1985; 2007–present
- Members: Honorary President; Sir Colin Davis; Honorary Vice President; Zygmunt Krauze; Principal Conductor; Geoffrey Álvarez
- Website: Alvarez Chamber Orchestra

The Alvarez Chamber Orchestra is a London-based organisation dedicated to the promotion and performance of contemporary classical music. Its Honorary President is Sir Colin Davis.

It holds an annual composition competition, "Plucked from Nowhere", for new music for harp and chamber orchestra. American composer Molly Kien is the author of The Song of Britomartis, the winning entry of the 2009 competition.

Artists who have worked with the orchestra include Nicholas Daniel, its Honorary Vice President Zygmunt Krauze, and guitarist Timothy Walker.

In 2008, the orchestra was invited to introduce its Autumn season Northern Ayres: An Anglo Polish Celebration at St John's Smith Square in the Polish Embassy in London.

== History ==
The ACO was active from 1979 to 1985 as a student and semi-professional orchestra that consisted of musicians from the NYO, RAM, and the City of London School. It performed a wide range of classical and contemporary chamber works, until it was disbanded when its founder, Geoffrey Álvarez, left London in 1985. In 2007 the ACO was re-formed as a professional orchestra and charitable trust, with the goal of performing music by contemporary international composers, who are little known in Britain, alongside that of their better known British colleagues.

== Repertoire ==
The ACO specialises in international music, commissioning and performing new works by artists who are little known outside of their homelands. In its first professional season (2008) the focus was upon the music of England and Poland, and this included various pieces by Aleksander Tansman. The orchestra performed the London premières of the Tansman Clarinet Concerto with clarinettist Alison Turriff, his Second Sinfonietta, and Diptyque. The ACO has also commissioned works by Boguslaw Schaeffer, Diana Burrell and Paul Patterson, and has also performed works by its founder and conductor Geoffrey Álvarez.

ACO in St John's, Smith Square

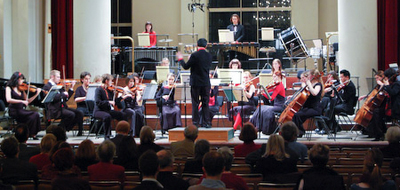
The ACO performing in St John's, Smith Square, November 2008
