= Acco super bulldozer =

Largest tracked bulldozer ever made

Coordinates: 45.7867°N 12.8396°E

ACCO Super Bulldozer
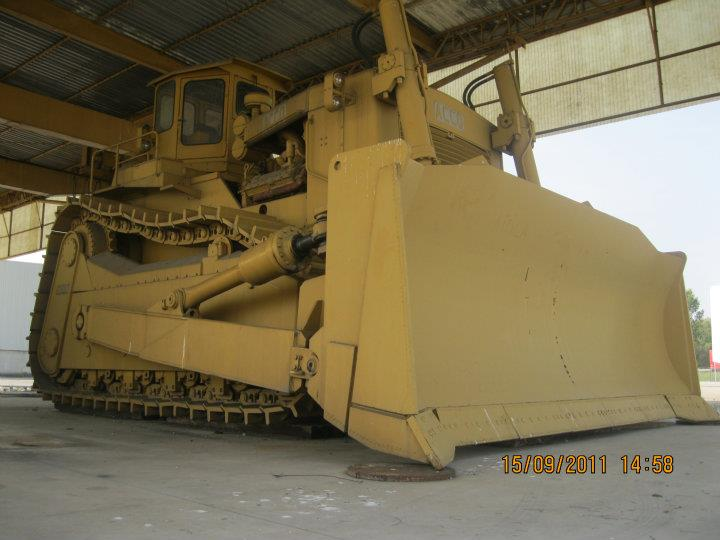
- Type: Bulldozer
- Manufacturer: Umberto Acco
- Production: 1
- Length: 23 metres (75 ft)
- Width: 7 metres (23 ft) (blade)
- Height: 6.5 metres (21 ft) (ripper)
- Weight: 183 tonnes (180 long tons; 202 short tons)
- Propulsion: Twin 675HP Caterpillar Diesel

The Acco Super Bulldozer is the largest and most powerful tracked bulldozer ever made. It was built in Portogruaro in northern Italy by the Umberto Acco company. The Acco super bulldozer was constructed mainly of Caterpillar parts; however, many other components were specially adapted. The dozer blade, for example, is bigger than anything Caterpillar has ever made. This bulldozer has a gross weight of 183 tonnes (180 long tons; 202 short tons) and is powered by two 675 hp (503 kW) Caterpillar engines placed horizontally opposed, which deliver a total combined output of 1,350 hp (1,010 kW). The super bulldozer has a blade that is 23 feet (7.0 m) wide and 9 feet (2.7 m) high, whilе the total length of the bulldozer is over 40 feet (12 m), from the tip of the blade to the ripper on the rear. The ripper alone is about 10 feet (3.0 m) tall, being powered by huge hydraulic rams.

This bulldozer was initially built to be exported to Libya in the early 1980s to help in land development. As the Leader of Libya, Colonel Gaddafi, was heavily involved with international terrorism at that time, the United States imposed a trade embargo on that country in 1986. As a direct consequence of these trade restrictions, the completed Acco Dozer was never shipped to its intended destination. This bulldozer has never been put to any operational use and was put into storage where it was built.

Acco ceased to exist when its founder Umberto Acco died and his son died shortly afterward. They left no legacy for managing the Acco company. Beginning in 2008, Acco's former main and secondary shops slowly turned into a dumping ground for surplus earth moving machinery, including the super bulldozer and its brother, a 200-tonne (200-long-ton; 220-short-ton) super grader.

By the end of May 2012 the dozer had been moved away from the abandoned Acco facility and is now safely stored at a gardening company in the same town, to be preserved and eventually put on display. The Acco Superdozer moved under its own power onto the trailer that took it to the new location.
