= All-trans-8'-apo-beta-carotenal 15,15'-oxygenase =

Enzyme

Identifiers
- EC no.: 1.14.99.41

Databases
- IntEnz: IntEnz view
- BRENDA: BRENDA entry
- ExPASy: NiceZyme view
- KEGG: KEGG entry
- MetaCyc: metabolic pathway
- PRIAM: profile
- PDB structures: RCSB PDB PDBe PDBsum
Search
- PMC: articles
- PubMed: articles
- NCBI: proteins

All-trans-8'-apo-beta-carotenal 15,15'-oxygenase (EC 1.14.99.41, Diox1, ACO, 8'-apo-beta-carotenal 15,15'-oxygenase) is an enzyme with systematic name all-trans-8'-apo-beta-carotenal:oxygen 15,15'-oxidoreductase (bond-cleaving). This enzyme catalyses the following chemical reaction

all-trans-8'-apo-beta-carotenal + O_{2} $\rightleftharpoons$ all-trans-retinal + (2E,4E,6E)-2,6-dimethylocta-2,4,6-trienedial

All-trans-8'-apo-beta-carotenal 15,15'-oxygenase contains an Fe^{2+}-4His arrangement.
