= Costa Rica Green Airways =

Costa Rican airline

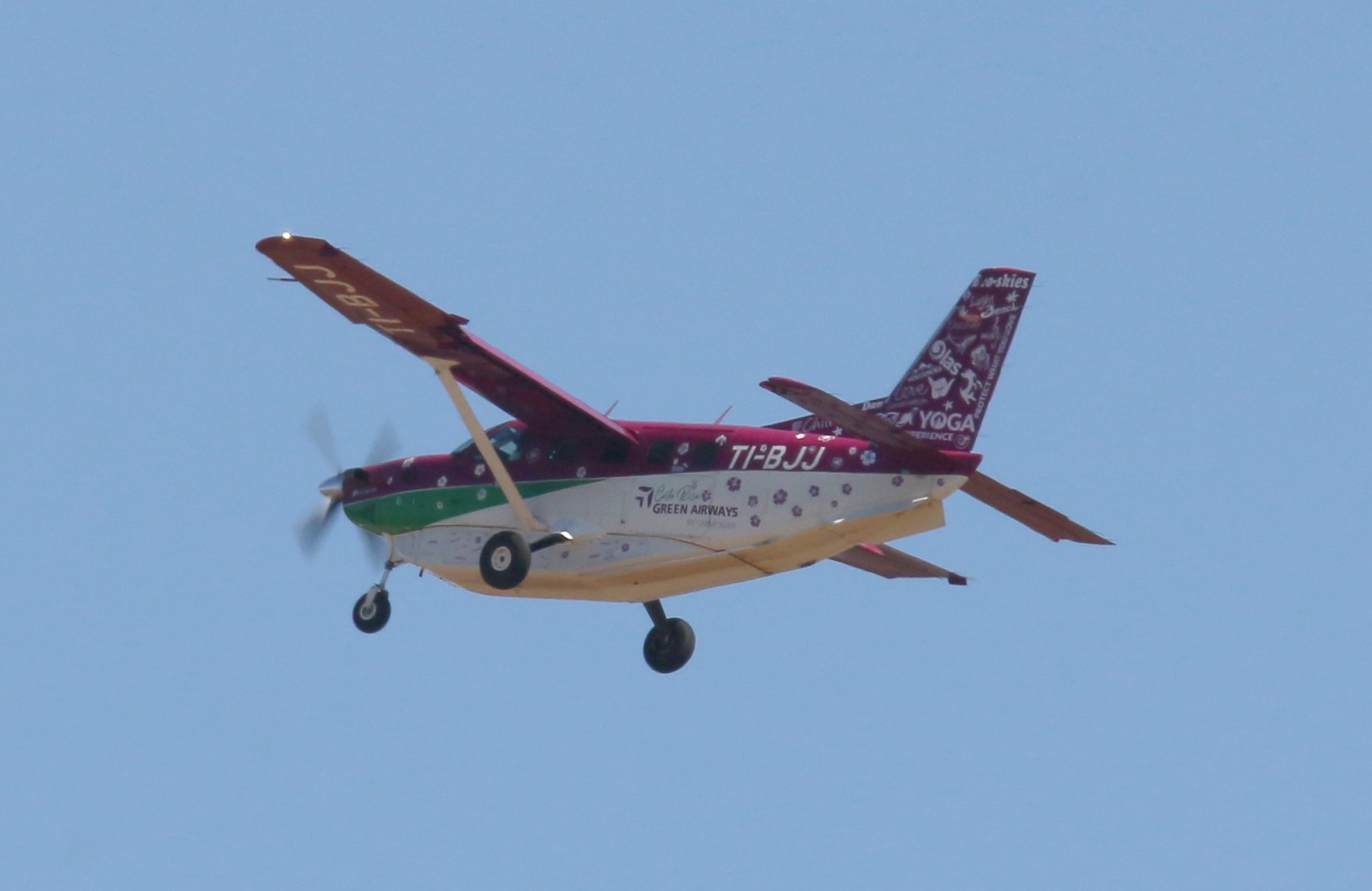
IATA	ICAO	Call sign
GW	CRG	GREENAIR
- Founded: October 2018; 7 years ago
- Hubs: Juan Santamaría International Airport
- Fleet size: 8
- Destinations: 4
- Headquarters: San José, Costa Rica
- Founder: Everardo Carmona
- Website: costaricagreenair.com

Costa Rica Green Airways Ltda. is a domestic airline based in San José, Costa Rica. The airline is established after Air Costa Rica's collapse.

== History ==
The airline was established in 2018 by Everardo Carmona, co-founder of CarmonAir Charter. It started operations in November 2018.

== Destinations ==
The destinations of Costa Rica Green Airways are:

- Quepos
- San José
- Cobano
- Puerto Jimenez

== Fleet ==
As of June 2022, the Costa Rica Green Airways fleet consists of:

Aircraft	In service	Passengers	Notes
Beechcraft King Air F90	1	7	TI-AWN
Britten Norman BN-2A-8 Islander	1	8	TI-BGK
Quest Kodiak 100	1	9	TI-BJJ
Cessna Grand Caravan EX	5	12	TI-BJC, TI-BKC, TI-BKO, TI-BKY, TI-BLK
Total	8		
