= Portogruaro =

- Comune
- Comune di Portogruaro
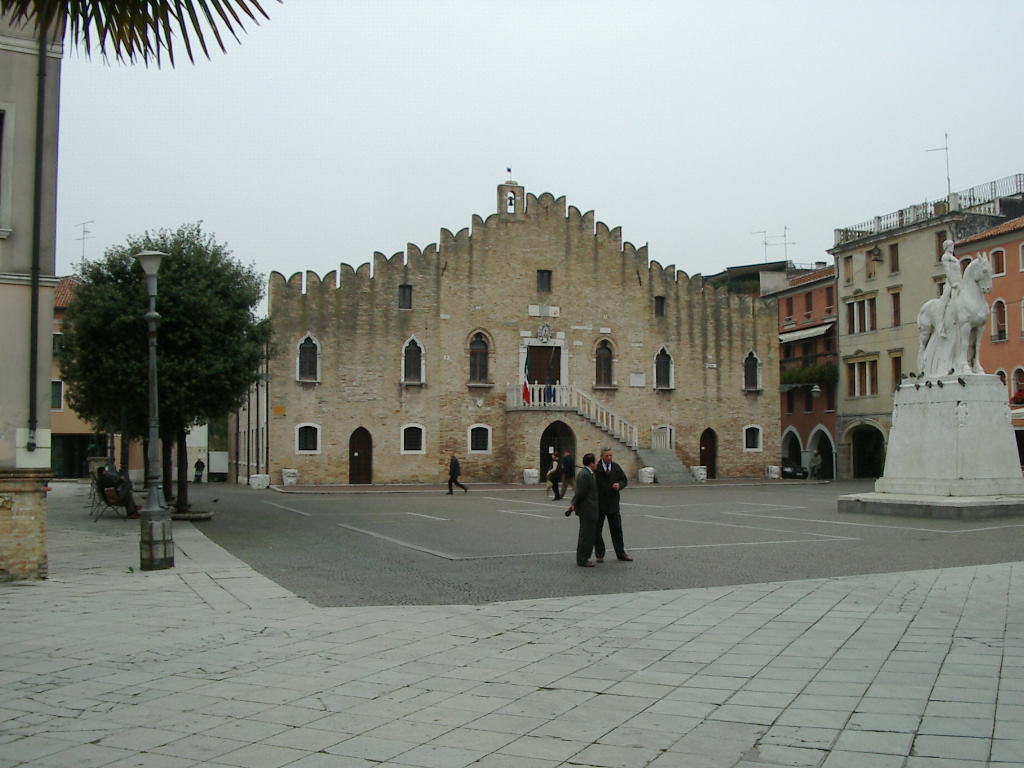
- Piazza della Repubblica, the main square, with the Town Hall.

- Coat of arms

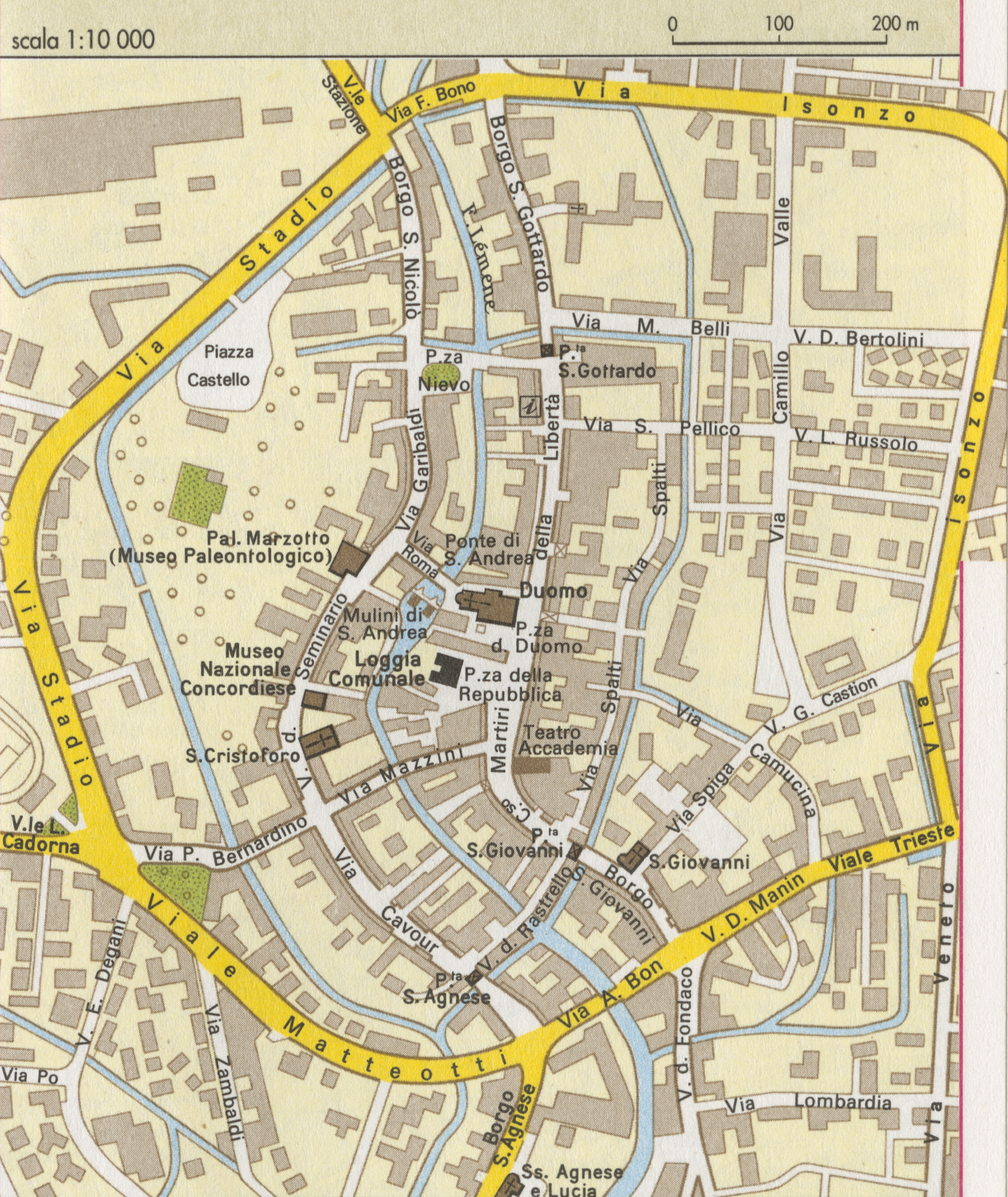

- Location within Italy Location within Veneto
- Coordinates: 45°47′N 12°50′E
- Country: Italy
- Region: Veneto
- Metropolitan city: Venice (VE)
- Frazioni: Giussago, Lison, Lugugnana, Portovecchio, Pradipozzo, Summaga

Government
  - Mayor: Iginio Olita (district commissioner)

Area
  - Total: 102.31 km^{2} (39.50 sq mi)
- Elevation: 5 m (16 ft)

Population (31 December 2014)
  - Total: 25,219
  - Density: 246.50/km^{2} (638.42/sq mi)
- Demonym: Portogruaresi
- Time zone: UTC+1 (CET)
  - Summer (DST): UTC+2 (CEST)
- Postal code: 30026
- Dialing code: 0421
- Patron saint: Saint Andrew
- Saint day: 30 November
- Website: Official website

Portogruaro (Venetian: Porto, Friulian: Puart) is a town and comune in the Metropolitan City of Venice, Veneto, northern Italy. The city was the centre of a district, made up of 11 comuni, which formed the Venezia Orientale with the San Donà di Piave district.

== History ==
Portogruaro was officially founded in 1140, when the Archbishop of Concordia, Gervinus, gave a group of fishermen (Giovanni Venerio, Arpone, Bertaldo, Borigoio, Enrico Mosca, Giovanni Salimbene) the right to settle there and build a river port. A castle had existed on the site as early as the 10th century. In 1420, after centuries under Patria del Friuli, was conquered by the Republic of Venice. According to Bertolini the town's foundation could be coeval to the Concordia Sagittaria's one. Under the Venetians the town retained some autonomy and was able to expand economically up until the economic decline of Venice from the 17th century onwards.

Following the upheavals of the Napoleonic Wars, Portogruaro was incorporated into the Austrian Empire in 1815. Apart from a brief uprising in 1848 Portogruaro remained under Austrian control until 1866 when it entered the newly unified Kingdom of Italy. Since that time the population of Portogruaro has grown from under 10,000 to around 25,000.

== Main sights ==
- Romanesque Abbey of Summaga (11th century). The church, built in 1211, has an 18th-century façade. The sacellum has frescoes from the 11th–12th centuries, depicting the Redemption, The Original Sin, The Punishment of Adam and Eve, the Crucifixion and the Final Judgement. The apse is also frescoed.
- Cathedral of Saint Andrea and Bell Tower
- Church of Saint Luis
- Church of Saint John
- Oratory of Visitation
- Town Hall, a Gothic building from 1265, with a façade including later additions (c. 1512). It houses three paintings by Luigi Russolo.
- Mills on the Lemene river (12th century)
- Church of Sant'Agnese (13th century)
- Communal Villa, a 16th-century patrician residence
- A series of 14th–15th-century palaces

The Roman and medieval city of Concordia Sagittaria was located nearby.

- The Acco Super Bulldozer is located in Portogruaro as well.

== Economy ==
A former large phosphates producer is now closed. The Camuffo Boatyard, founded in 1438, is one of the oldest industries in the world.

=== Agriculture ===
In the "frazioni" of Lison e Pradipozzo are produced several wines which are exported all around the world:

- Lison-Pramaggiore Merlot riserva
- Lison-Pramaggiore Cabernet riserva
- Lison-Pramaggiore Cabernet franc
- Lison-Pramaggiore Refosco dal peduncolo rosso
- Lison-Pramaggiore Verduzzo
- Lison-Pramaggiore Sauvignon
- Lison-Pramaggiore Chardonnay
- Lison-Pramaggiore Merlot
- Lison-Pramaggiore Cabernet
- Lison-Pramaggiore Pinot Bianco
- Lison-Pramaggiore Tocai italico
- Lison-Pramaggiore Pinot grigio
- Lison-Pramaggiore Cabernet sauvignon
- Lison-Pramaggiore Riesling italico
- Lison-Pramaggiore Tocai italico classico
- Lison-Pramaggiore Merlot rosato
- Lison-Pramaggiore Cabernet sauvignon riserva
- Lison-Pramaggiore Cabernet franc riserva

== Transport ==
- Portogruaro-Caorle railway station

== Sport ==
The local football club is called Calcio Portogruaro Summaga, founded in 1990, and plays in the fourth Italian league (Serie D).

== Notable people ==
- Antonio Carnio, 17th-century painter
- Nicolò Bettoni (1770–1842), editor (published Dei sepolcri by Ugo Foscolo)
- Lorenzo Buffon (1929-), goalkeeper
- Lorenzo Da Ponte (1749–1838), poet and librettist
- Giulio Camillo Delminio (1480–1544), humanist and philosopher
- Fortunato Pasquetti (1690–1773), painter
- Luigi Russolo (1885–1947), composer and painter
- Enoch Opoku-Gyamfi (2006-) Rugby Union player

== Twin towns ==
- Marmande, France, since 1987
- Ejea de los Caballeros, Spain, since 1987

== Climate ==
Climate data for Portogruaro (Lison) (1991–2020)
Month	Jan	Feb	Mar	Apr	May	Jun	Jul	Aug	Sep	Oct	Nov	Dec	Year
Mean daily maximum °C (°F)	7.8 (46.0)	9.7 (49.5)	14.0 (57.2)	18.3 (64.9)	23.2 (73.8)	27.3 (81.1)	29.7 (85.5)	29.9 (85.8)	24.9 (76.8)	19.4 (66.9)	13.2 (55.8)	8.5 (47.3)	18.8 (65.9)
Daily mean °C (°F)	3.4 (38.1)	4.7 (40.5)	8.6 (47.5)	12.9 (55.2)	17.6 (63.7)	21.4 (70.5)	23.4 (74.1)	23.4 (74.1)	18.8 (65.8)	14.0 (57.2)	8.9 (48.0)	4.3 (39.7)	13.5 (56.2)
Mean daily minimum °C (°F)	−0.9 (30.4)	−0.3 (31.5)	3.1 (37.6)	7.5 (45.5)	12.0 (53.6)	15.5 (59.9)	17.1 (62.8)	16.9 (62.4)	12.7 (54.9)	8.7 (47.7)	4.5 (40.1)	0.1 (32.2)	8.1 (46.6)
Average precipitation mm (inches)	61.4 (2.42)	68.3 (2.69)	63.3 (2.49)	88.8 (3.50)	94.8 (3.73)	96.1 (3.78)	73.3 (2.89)	90.7 (3.57)	119.0 (4.69)	104.3 (4.11)	115.6 (4.55)	83.8 (3.30)	1,059.4 (41.72)
Average precipitation days	6.1	5.3	6.1	9.1	9.5	7.8	7.0	7.1	8.1	7.6	8.2	7.1	89
Source: Istituto Superiore per la Protezione e la Ricerca Ambientale
