= Aco (given name) =

Aco is a masculine given name, often a short form (hypocorism) of Aleksandar, which may refer to:

- Aleksandar Aco Apolonio (died 2001), first and only president of the self-proclaimed Dubrovnik Republic (1991–1992)
- Aleksandar Aco Đukanović, controversial Montenegrin businessman
- Aco Jonovski (born 1980), Macedonian handball player
- Aco Karamanov (1927–1944), Macedonian poet and partisan
- Aco Mavec (1929–1982), Slovene painter
- Aleksandar Aco Pejović (born 1972), Serbian pop-folk singer
- Aleksandar Petrović (basketball, born February 1959), Croatian basketball coach and former player
- Aleksandar Petrović (basketball, born October 1959) (1959–2014), Serbian basketball coach
- Aco Šopov (1923–1982), Macedonian poet
- Aco Stojkov (born 1983), Macedonian footballer
