= Acho =

Acho is a surname. Notable people with the surname include:

- Emmanuel Acho (born 1990), American football player
- James Acho, American sportswriter
- Sam Acho (born 1988), American football player

as first name:

- Acho (vice-chancellor), 13th-century Hungarian cleric

== See also ==
- Acho people, a protohistorical band of Lipan Apache
- Plaza de toros de Acho, bullring in Lima, Peru
