= List of the busiest airports in Central America =

This is a list of the busiest airports in Central America by passenger traffic, a statistic available for almost all the airstrips taken into account. The list intends to include all the international and domestic airports in the area geographically defined as Central America, comprising Belize, Guatemala, El Salvador, Honduras, Nicaragua, Costa Rica, and Panama.

Because each country has a different body to control these statistics, the compilation of data is difficult and not homogeneously distributed. The information presented here represents the best available data from various Internet sources. The ranking is ordered according to total passenger traffic (unless the footnotes indicate otherwise). Information on aircraft or cargo movements is not available for all the airports.

== Ranking of airports, 2018 ==
	Country	Airport name	IATA/ICAO Code	City served	Passengers
1.	Panama	Tocumen International Airport	PTY/MPTO	Panamá City	16,242,679
2.	El Salvador	El Salvador International Airport	SAL/MSLP	San Salvador	5,298,491
3.	Costa Rica	Juan Santamaría International Airport	SJO/MROC	San José	4,971,024
4.	Guatemala	La Aurora International Airport	GUA/MGGT	Guatemala City	2,762,582
5.	Belize	Philip S. W. Goldson International Airport	BZE/MZBZ	Belize City	1,130,000^{[7]}
6.	Costa Rica	Guanacaste Airport	LIR/MRLB	Liberia	1,084,701

== Ranking of airports, 2016 ==
	Country	Airport name	IATA/ICAO Code	City served	Passengers
1.	Panama	Tocumen International Airport	PTY/MPTO	Panamá City	14,741,937^{[1]}
2.	Costa Rica	Juan Santamaría International Airport	SJO/MROC	San José	6,456,750^{[2]}
3.	El Salvador	Comalapa International Airport	SAL/MSLP	San Salvador	2,984,764^{[3]}
4.	Guatemala	La Aurora International Airport	GUA/MGGT	Guatemala City	2,579,123^{[4]}
5.	Nicaragua	Augusto C. Sandino International Airport	MGA/MNMG	Managua	1,533,034^{[5]}
6.	Costa Rica	Daniel Oduber International Airport	LIR/MRLB	Liberia	1,182,123^{[6]}
7.	Belize	Philip S. W. Goldson International Airport	BZE/MZBZ	Belize City	867,976^{[7]}
8.	Honduras	Ramón Villeda Morales International Airport	SAP/MHLM	San Pedro Sula	867,747^{[8]}
9.	Honduras	Toncontín International Airport	TGU/MHTG	Tegucigalpa	697,925^{[8]}
10.	Honduras	Juan Manuel Gálvez International Airport	RTB/MHRO	Roatán	371,657^{[8]}
11.	Panama	Enrique Malek International Airport	DAV/MPDA	David	323,465^{[1]}
12.	Panama	Albrook International Airport	PAC/MPMG	Panamá City	230,000^{[10]}
13.	Honduras	Golosón International Airport	LCE/MHLC	La Ceiba	165,802^{[7]}
14.	Panama	Panamá Pacífico International Airport	BLB/MPHO	Panamá City	131,930^{[1]}
15.	Guatemala	Mundo Maya International Airport	FRS/MGTK	Flores/Tikal	113,444^{[4]}
16.	Panama	Scarlett Martínez International Airport	RIH/MPSM	Río Hato	63,728^{[1]}

== Ranking of airports, 2015 ==
	Country	Airport name	IATA/ICAO Code	City served	Passengers
1.	Panama	Tocumen International Airport	PTY/MPTO	Panamá City	13,434,673^{[1]}
2.	Costa Rica	Juan Santamaría International Airport	SJO/MROC	San José	4,494,875^{[2]}
3.	El Salvador	Comalapa International Airport	SAL/MSLP	San Salvador	2,725,458^{[3]}
4.	Guatemala	La Aurora International Airport	GUA/MGGT	Guatemala City	2,323,360^{[4]}
5.	Nicaragua	Augusto C. Sandino International Airport	MGA/MNMG	Managua	1,499,756^{[5]}
6.	Honduras	Ramón Villeda Morales International Airport	SAP/MHLM	San Pedro Sula	881,199^{[7]}
7.	Costa Rica	Daniel Oduber International Airport	LIR/MRLB	Liberia	878,365^{[2]}
8.	Belize	Philip S. W. Goldson International Airport	BZE/MZBZ	Belize City	613,399^{[8]}
9.	Honduras	Toncontín International Airport	TGU/MHTG	Tegucigalpa	603,486^{[7]}
10.	Honduras	Juan Manuel Gálvez International Airport	RTB/MHRO	Roatán	286,738^{[7]}
11.	Panama	Enrique Malek International Airport	DAV/MPDA	David	260,603^{[9]}
12.	Panama	Albrook International Airport	PAC/MPMG	Panamá City	228,722^{[10]}
13.	Honduras	Golosón International Airport	LCE/MHLC	La Ceiba	133,768^{[7]}
14.	Panama	Panamá Pacífico International Airport	BLB/MPHO	Panamá City	132,205^{[9]}
15.	Guatemala	Mundo Maya International Airport	FRS/MGTK	Flores/Tikal	109,490^{[4]}
16.	Panama	Bocas del Toro International Airport	BOC/MPBO	Bocas/Isla Colón	80,378^{[12]}
17.	Nicaragua	Bluefields Airport	BEF/MNBL	Bluefields	63,200^{[13]}
18.	Nicaragua	Corn Island Airport	RNI/MNCI	Corn Islands	62,200^{[13]}
19.	Nicaragua	Puerto Cabezas Airport	PUZ/MNPC	Puerto Cabezas	40,100^{[13]}
20.	Costa Rica	Tambor Airport	TMU/MRTR	Tambor	38,699^{[2]}
21.	Costa Rica	Puerto Jiménez Airport	PJM/MRPJ	Puerto Jiménez	38,165^{[2]}
22.	Panama	Scarlett Martínez International Airport	RIH/MPSM	Río Hato	37,759^{[9]}
23.	Costa Rica	Quepos La Managua Airport	XQP/MRQP	Quepos	29,872^{[2]}
24.	Guatemala	San José Airport	GSJ/MGSJ	Puerto San José	28,598^{[4]}
25.	Panama	Capitán Manuel Niño International Airport	CHX/MPCH	Changuinola	18,664^{[12]}
26.	Costa Rica	Tamarindo Airport	TNO/MRTM	Tamarindo	18,209^{[2]}
27.	Costa Rica	Golfito Airport	GLF/MRGF	Golfito	18,024^{[2]}
28.	Costa Rica	Tobías Bolaños International Airport	SYQ/MRPV	San José	14,723^{[2]}
29.	Costa Rica	Bahía Drake Airport	DRK/MRDK	Bahía Drake	13,105^{[2]}
30.	El Salvador	Ilopango International Airport	-/MSSS	San Salvador	12,385^{[14]}

== Ranking of airports, 2014 ==
	Country	Airport name	IATA/ICAO Code	City served	Passengers
1.	Panama	Tocumen International Airport	PTY/MPTO	Panamá City	12,782,167^{[1]}
2.	Costa Rica	Juan Santamaría International Airport	SJO/MROC	San José	3,917,573^{[2]}
3.	El Salvador	Comalapa International Airport	SAL/MSLP	San Salvador	2,453,217^{[3]}
4.	Guatemala	La Aurora International Airport	GUA/MGGT	Guatemala City	2,216,915^{[4]}
5.	Nicaragua	Augusto C. Sandino International Airport	MGA/MNMG	Managua	1,311.965^{[5]}
6.	Costa Rica	Daniel Oduber International Airport	LIR/MRLB	Liberia	779,757^{[2]}
7.	Honduras	Ramón Villeda Morales International Airport	SAP/MHLM	San Pedro Sula	772,504^{[6]}
8.	Honduras	Toncontín International Airport	TGU/MHTG	Tegucigalpa	617,526^{[6]}
9.	Belize	Philip S. W. Goldson International Airport	BZE/MZBZ	Belize City	577,970^{[7]}
10.	Honduras	Juan Manuel Gálvez International Airport	RTB/MHRO	Roatán	286,738^{[6]}
11.	Panama	Enrique Malek International Airport	DAV/MPDA	David	260,603^{[8]}
12.	Panama	Albrook International Airport	PAC/MPMG	Panamá City	239,315^{[9]}
13.	Honduras	Golosón International Airport	LCE/MHLC	La Ceiba	133,768^{[6]}
14.	Panama	Panamá Pacífico International Airport	BLB/MPHO	Panamá City	132,205^{[8]}
15.	Guatemala	Mundo Maya International Airport	FRS/MGTK	Flores/Tikal	111,075^{[4]}
16.	Costa Rica	Tobías Bolaños International Airport	SYQ/MRPV	San José	88,363^{[2]}
17.	Panama	Bocas del Toro International Airport	BOC/MPBO	Bocas/Isla Colón	80,378^{[10]}
18.	Nicaragua	Corn Island Airport	RNI/MNCI	Corn Islands	50,700^{[10]}
19.	Nicaragua	Bluefields Airport	BEF/MNBL	Bluefields	45,500^{[10]}
20.	Nicaragua	Puerto Cabezas Airport	PUZ/MNPC	Puerto Cabezas	41,000^{[10]}
21.	Panama	Scarlett Martínez International Airport	RIH/MPSM	Río Hato	37,759^{[8]}
22.	Costa Rica	Puerto Jiménez Airport	PJM/MRPJ	Puerto Jiménez	35,745^{[2]}
23.	Costa Rica	Quepos La Managua Airport	XQP/MRQP	Quepos	32,717^{[2]}
24.	Costa Rica	Tamarindo Airport	TNO/MRTM	Tamarindo	30,108^{[2]}
25.	Guatemala	San José Airport	GSJ/MGSJ	Puerto San José	28,456^{[4]}
26.	Costa Rica	Tambor Airport	TMU/MRTR	Tambor	19,382^{[2]}
27.	Panama	Capitán Manuel Niño International Airport	CHX/MPCH	Changuinola	18,664^{[10]}
28.	Costa Rica	Golfito Airport	GLF/MRGF	Golfito	15,771^{[2]}
29.	Costa Rica	Bahía Drake Airport	DRK/MRDK	Bahía Drake	13,438^{[2]}
30.	Guatemala	Retalhuleu Airport	RER/MGRT	Retalhuleu	12,530^{[4]}

== Ranking of airports, 2013 ==
	Country	Airport name	IATA/ICAO Code	City served	Passengers
1.	Panama	Tocumen International Airport	PTY/MPTO	Panamá City	11,586,681^{[1]}
2.	Costa Rica	Juan Santamaría International Airport	SJO/MROC	San José	3,820,688^{[2]}
3.	El Salvador	Comalapa International Airport	SAL/MSLP	San Salvador	2,355,001^{[3]}
4.	Guatemala	La Aurora International Airport	GUA/MGGT	Guatemala City	1,917,362^{[5]}
5.	Nicaragua	Augusto C. Sandino International Airport	MGA/MNMG	Managua	1,206.172^{[4]}
6.	Honduras	Ramón Villeda Morales International Airport	SAP/MHLM	San Pedro Sula	763,000^{[6]}
7.	Costa Rica	Daniel Oduber International Airport	LIR/MRLB	Liberia	663,246^{[2]}
8.	Honduras	Toncontín International Airport	TGU/MHTG	Tegucigalpa	587,000^{[6]}
9.	Belize	Philip S. W. Goldson International Airport	BZE/MZBZ	Belize City	518,000^{[11]}
10.	Panama	Albrook International Airport	PAC/MPMG	Panamá City	315,000^{[7]}
11.	Honduras	Juan Manuel Gálvez International Airport	RTB/MHRO	Roatán	263,000^{[6]}
12.	Panama	Enrique Malek International Airport	DAV/MPDA	David	165,000^{[7]}
13.	Honduras	Golosón International Airport	LCE/MHLC	La Ceiba	148,000^{[6]}
14.	Guatemala	Mundo Maya International Airport	FRS/MGTK	Flores/Tikal	102,000^{[9]}
15.	Costa Rica	Tobías Bolaños International Airport	SYQ/MRPV	San José	18,534^{[02]}
16.	Panama	Bocas del Toro International Airport	BOC/MPBO	Bocas/Isla Colón	60,292^{[7]}
17.	Costa Rica	La Managua Airport	XQP/MRQP	Quepos	31,000^{[10]}
18.	Costa Rica	Tambor Airport	TMU/MRTR	Tambor	28,000^{[10]}
19.	Panama	Capitán Manuel Niño International Airport	CHX/MPCH	Changuinola	15,842^{[7]}
20.	Nicaragua	Bluefields Airport	BEF/MNBL	Bluefields	23,000^{[5]}

== Ranking of airports, 2012 ==
	Country	Airport name	IATA/ICAO Code	City served	Passengers
1.	Panama	Tocumen International Airport	PTY/MPTO	Panamá City	10,174,870^{[1]}
2.	Costa Rica	Juan Santamaría International Airport	SJO/MROC	San José	3,872,467^{[2]}
3.	El Salvador	Comalapa International Airport	SAL/MSLP	San Salvador	2,100,794^{[3]}
4.	Guatemala	La Aurora International Airport	GUA/MDGT	Guatemala City	2,090,374^{[5]}
5.	Nicaragua	Augusto C. Sandino International Airport	MGA/MNMG	Managua	1,201.644^{[4]}
6.	Honduras	Ramón Villeda Morales International Airport	SAP/MHLM	San Pedro Sula	769,000^{[6]}
7.	Costa Rica	Daniel Oduber International Airport	LIR/MRLB	Liberia	668,762^{[2]}
8.	Honduras	Toncontín International Airport	TGU/MHTG	Tegucigalpa	581,000^{[6]}
9.	Belize	Philip S. W. Goldson International Airport	BZE/MZBZ	Belize City	502,000^{[11]}
10.	Panama	Albrook International Airport	PAC/MPMG	Panamá City	276,378^{[7]}
11.	Honduras	Juan Manuel Gálvez International Airport	RTB/MHRO	Roatán	248,000^{[6]}
12.	Honduras	Golosón International Airport	LCE/MHLC	La Ceiba	175,000^{[6]}
13.	Panama	Enrique Malek International Airport	DAV/MPDA	David	145,671^{[7]}
14.	Guatemala	Mundo Maya International Airport	FRS/MGTK	Flores/Tikal	99,000^{[9]}
15.	Costa Rica	Tobías Bolaños International Airport	SYQ/MRPV	San José	84,194^{[02]}
16.	Panama	Bocas del Toro International Airport	BOC/MPBO	Bocas/Isla Colón	72,340^{[7]}
17.	Nicaragua	Puerto Cabezas Airport	PUZ/MNPC	Puerto Cabezas	42,346^{[5]}
18.	Nicaragua	Corn Island Airport	RNI/MNCI	Corn Island	37,241^{[5]}
19.	Nicaragua	Bluefields Airport	BEF/MNBL	Bluefields	36,659^{[5]}
20.	Costa Rica	Tambor Airport	TMU/MRTR	Tambor	29,014^{[10]}
21.	Costa Rica	La Managua Airport	XQP/MRQP	Quepos	27,550^{[10]}
22.	Costa Rica	Puerto Jiménez Airport	PJM/MRPJ	Puerto Jiménez	27,488^{[10]}
23.	Panama	Capitán Manuel Niño International Airport	CHX/MPCH	Changuinola	19,010^{[7]}
24.	Costa Rica	Tamarindo Airport	TNO/MRTN	Tamarindo	16,548^{[10]}
25.	Costa Rica	Golfito Airport	GLF/MRGF	Golfito	16,546^{[10]}

== Ranking of airports, 2011 ==
	Country	Airport name	IATA/ICAO Code	City served	Passengers
1.	Panama	Tocumen International Airport	PTY/MPTO	Panamá City	8,271,459^{[1]}
2.	El Salvador	Comalapa International Airport	SAL/MSLP	San Salvador	2,800,354^{[3]}

== Ranking of airports, 2010 ==
	Country	Airport name	IATA/ICAO Code	City served	Passengers
1.	Panama	Tocumen International Airport	PTY/MPTO	Panamá City	7,005,031^{[1]}
2.	Costa Rica	Juan Santamaría International Airport	SJO/MROC	San José	3,858,401^{[2]}
3.	El Salvador	Comalapa International Airport	SAL/MSLP	San Salvador	1,976,326^{[3]}
4.	Guatemala	La Aurora International Airport	GUA/MGGT	Guatemala City	1,970,618^{[4]}
5.	Nicaragua	Augusto C. Sandino International Airport	MGA/MNMG	Managua	1,102,200^{[5]}
6.	Honduras	Ramón Villeda Morales International Airport	SAP/MHLM	San Pedro Sula	742,000^{[6]}
7.	Honduras	Toncontín International Airport	TGU/MHTG	Tegucigalpa	493,000^{[6]}
8.	Costa Rica	Daniel Oduber International Airport	LIR/MRLB	Liberia	443,585^{[7]}
9.	Panama	Albrook International Airport	PAC/MPMG	Panamá City	269,443^{[8]}
10.	Honduras	Juan Manuel Gálvez International Airport	RTB/MHRO	Roatán	214,000^{[6]}
11.	Honduras	Golosón International Airport	LCE/MHLC	La Ceiba	181,000^{[6]}
12.	Belize	Philip S. W. Goldson International Airport	BZE/MZBZ	Belize City	172,402^{[9]}
13.	Panama	Enrique Malek International Airport	DAV/MPDA	David	117,260^{[8]}
14.	Costa Rica	Tobías Bolaños International Airport	SYQ/MRPV	San José	101,573^{[10]}
15.	Guatemala	Mundo Maya International Airport	FRS/MGTK	Flores/Tikal	100,525^{[11]}
16.	Panama	Bocas del Toro International Airport	BOC/MPBO	Bocas/Isla Colón	59,091^{[8]}
17.	Nicaragua	Bluefields Airport	BEF/MNBL	Bluefields	21,894^{[5]}

== Ranking of airports, 2009 ==
Ordered by total passenger traffic, international and domestic, with final data for 2009.

	Country	Airport name	IATA/ICAO Code	City served	Passengers
1.	Panama	Tocumen International Airport	PTY/MPTO	Panamá City	6,531,927^{[1]}
2.	Costa Rica	Juan Santamaría International Airport	SJO/MROC	San José	3,730,187^{[2]}
3.	El Salvador	Comalapa International Airport	SAL/MSLP	San Salvador	2,076,258^{[3]}
4.	Guatemala	La Aurora International Airport	GUA/MGGT	Guatemala City	1,948,662^{[4]}
5.	Nicaragua	Augusto C. Sandino International Airport	MGA/MNMG	Managua	1,089,992^{[5]}
6.	Honduras	Ramón Villeda Morales International Airport	SAP/MHLM	San Pedro Sula	742,000^{[6]}
7.	Honduras	Toncontín International Airport	TGU/MHTG	Tegucigalpa	565,000^{[6]}
8.	Belize	Philip S. W. Goldson International Airport	BZE/MZBZ	Belize City	450,000^{[7]}
9.	Costa Rica	Daniel Oduber International Airport	LIR/MRLB	Liberia	376,858^{[2]}
10.	Panama	Albrook International Airport	PAC/MPMG	Panamá City	269,002^{[8]}
11.	Panama	Enrique Malek International Airport	DAV/MPDA	David	122,940^{[10]}
12.	Guatemala	Mundo Maya International Airport	FRS/MGTK	Flores/Tikal	111,893^{[9]}
13.	Costa Rica	Tobías Bolaños International Airport	SYQ/MRPV	San José	104,343^{[11]}
14.	Panama	Bocas del Toro International Airport	BOC/MPBO	Bocas/Isla Colón	63,325^{[10]}
15.	Honduras	Juan Manuel Galvez International Airport	RTB/MHRO	Roatan	60,150^{[11]}

== Ranking of airports, 2008 ==
According to Airports Council International's World Airport Traffic Report 2009, and ordered by total passenger traffic (international and domestic), total aircraft movements and total cargo (freight and mail, in metric tonnes)^{[12]}. Information for Guatemala and Belize airports are excluded in this report and some other airports in Costa Rica Rica and Panama.

	Country	Airport name	IATA/ICAO	Passengers	Movements	Cargo
1.	Panama	Tocumen International Airport	PTY/MPTO	4,549,170	80,694	86,588
2.	Costa Rica	Juan Santamaría International Airport	SJO/MROC	3,238,602	77,114	78,850
3.	El Salvador	Comalapa International Airport	SAL/MSLP	1,570,012	33,922	28,162
4.	Nicaragua	Augusto C. Sandino International Airport	MGA/MNMG	1,192,489	18,222	42,621
5.	Honduras	Ramón Villeda Morales International Airport	SAP/MHLM	840,592	29,278	7,498
6.	Honduras	Toncontín International Airport	TGU/MHTG	452,144	20,324	4,668
7.	Honduras	Juan Manuel Gálvez International Airport	RTB/MHRO	209,310	11,822	0
8.	Honduras	Golosón International Airport	LCE/MHLC	202,864	21,739	0

== Ranking of airports, 2006 ==
According to Airports Council International's World Airport Traffic Report 2006, and ordered by total passenger traffic (international and domestic), total aircraft movements and total cargo (freight and mail, in metric tonnes)^{[12]}. Information for Guatemala and Belize airports are excluded in this report and some other airports in Costa Rica Rica and Panama.

	Country	Airport name	IATA/ICAO	Passengers	Movements	Cargo
1.	Panama	Tocumen International Airport	PTY/MPTO	3,215,423	61,161	82,186
2.	Costa Rica	Juan Santamaría International Airport	SJO/MROC	2,623,464	62,158	81,179
3.	El Salvador	Comalapa International Airport	SAL/MSLP	1,624,814	38,264	29,805
4.	Nicaragua	Augusto C. Sandino International Airport	MGA/MNMG	1,089,992	30,991	21,700
5.	Honduras	Ramón Villeda Morales International Airport	SAP/MHLM	593,374	24,680	6,695
6.	Honduras	Toncontín International Airport	TGU/MHTG	545,586	17,904	5,081
7.	Honduras	Golosón International Airport	LCE/MHLC	230,640	22,744	0
8.	Honduras	Juan Manuel Gálvez International Airport	RTB/MHRO	208,152	11,406	0

== Ranking of airports, 2005 ==
According to Airports Council International's World Airport Traffic Report 2006, it is ordered by total passenger traffic (international and domestic), total aircraft movements, and total cargo (freight and mail, in metric tonnes)^{[12]}. Information for Guatemala and Belize airports are excluded in this report and some other airports in Costa Rica Rica and Panama.

	Country	Airport name	IATA/ICAO	Passengers	Movements	Cargo
1.	Costa Rica	Juan Santamaría International Airport	SJO/MROC	2,836,867	69,060	82,959
2.	Panama	Tocumen International Airport	PTY/MPTO	2,756,948	56,837	103,164
3.	El Salvador	Comalapa International Airport	SAL/MSLP	1,640,721	40,570	25,969
4.	Nicaragua	Augusto C. Sandino International Airport	MGA/MNMG	1,062,704	30,902	19,214
5.	Honduras	Ramón Villeda Morales International Airport	SAP/MHLM	586,120	24,984	7,300
6.	Honduras	Toncontín International Airport	TGU/MHTG	516,840	17,886	5,083
7.	Honduras	Golosón International Airport	LCE/MHLC	254,554	25,894	0
8.	Honduras	Juan Manuel Gálvez International Airport	RTB/MHRO	215,994	12,942	0

== See also ==
- List of the busiest airports in the Caribbean
- List of the busiest airports in Latin America
- List of the busiest airports in South America

== Notes ==
1. Total passenger Traffic (ICAO standard and ACI Standard):Reporte Estadistico 2016.
2. Total passenger Traffic for 2016, as presented by Costa Rica's Civil Aviation Authority website, Resumen Estadístico 2016. Data for Juan Santamaría International Airport is estimated for both international and domestic passengers.
3. Data according to the Autonomous Port Executive Commission Statistics Department.
4. Total Passenger Traffic according to the Air Transport Statistics Unit, Directorate General of Civil Aviation. Sum up of Total Arrivals and Total Departures.
5. Information available on the airport website. See "Traffic Data" section. The number represents the sum of total International Incoming, International Departure, Domestic Incoming and Domestic Departure passengers, for the year in question.
6. La Nación (San José, Costa Rica). Aeropuerto internacional Daniel Oduber supera los 4 millones de pasajeros en los últimos cinco años, January 12, 2017.
7. Total Passenger Traffic for 2016, according to the Philip S.W. Goldson International Airport Authority About us.
8. El Heraldo (Tegucigalpa, Honduras). Honduras:En 14% aumenta el flujo de viajeros por aeropuertos.
9. Important: 2015 Total Passenger Traffic only, as presented on the airport website. 2015 Annual Statistics Report.
10. Important: 2015 Traffic Data for January–October only. Total Traffic according to the Institutional Yearbook, 2015 of Panama's Civil Aviation Authority.
11. Important: 2014 Domestic Passenger Traffic only, according to Panama's Civil Aviation Authority website, Domestic statistics 2014 for Marcos A. Gelabert Airport.
12. Total traffic, according to the Ministry of Transport and Infrastructure. 2015 Nicaragua's Transport Statistical Yearbook.
13. Total traffic, according to the Civil Aviation authority of Guatemala, Regional Airport Statistics, 2015.
14. Data according to the Autonomous Port Executive Commission Statistics Department. Ilopango International Airport Statistics, 2015.
15. Total passenger Traffic (ICAO standard and ACI Standard):Annual Report 2017.
