= La Fortuna Arenal Airport =

Arenal Airport
- IATA: FON; ICAO: MRAN

Summary
- Airport type: Private
- Serves: La Fortuna, Costa Rica
- Elevation AMSL: 342 ft (104 m)
- Coordinates: 10°28′10″N 84°34′44″W

Map
- Location in Costa Rica

Runways
Direction	Length		Surface
Direction	m	ft	Surface
06/24	800	2,625	Asphalt

Statistics (2017)
- Passengers: 13,186
- Passenger change 16–17: ▲51.2%
- Source: AIP GCM SkyVector Google Maps

Arenal Airport (IATA: FON, ICAO: MRAN) is an airport serving La Fortuna, a district in San Carlos Canton, Alajuela Province, Costa Rica. The airport is named after the Arenal Volcano, one of the major tourist attractions in the country.

Arenal Airport is a private-managed airstrip, currently served by daily flights from Quepos and the capital city, San José. Located in the countryside 7 kilometres (4.3 mi) east of La Fortuna, it can be reached by Route 141.

== Facilities ==
The airport has an 800 metres (2,600 ft) asphalt runway commonly served by small aircraft like Cessna 208 Caravan and de Havilland Canada DHC-6 Twin Otter. Approach to Runway 24 crosses over a hangar at the beginning of the runway.

The Fiora non-directional beacon (Ident: FIO) is located 10.1 nautical miles (19 km) east of the airport. The El Coco VOR-DME (Ident: TIO) is located 37.9 nautical miles (70 km) southeast of Arenal Airport.

== Airlines and destinations ==
Airlines	Destinations
Aerobell Airlines	San José–Tobías Bolaños
Sansa Airlines	Liberia, San José–Juan Santamaría, Tortuguero

== Passenger statistics ==
These data show number of passengers movements into the airport, according to the Directorate General of Civil Aviation of Costa Rica's Statistical Yearbooks.

Year	2010	2011	2012	2013	2014	2015	2016	2017
Passengers	5,815	4,726	3,250	5,842	6,596	5,440	8,723	13,186
Growth (%)	▼4.33%	▼18.73%	▼31.23%	▲79.75%	▲12.91%	▼17.53%	▲60.35%	▲51.16%
Source: Costa Rica's Directorate General of Civil Aviation (DGAC). Statistical Yearbooks (Years 2010, 2011, 2012, 2013, 2014, 2015, 2016, and 2017)

Year	2000	2001	2002	2003	2004	2005	2006	2007	2008	2009
Passengers	N.D.	N.D.	N.D.	37	N.D.	10	83	7,149	7,403	6,078
Growth (%)	N.D.	N.D.	N.D.	N.D.	N.D.	N.D.	▲730.00%	▲8,513.25%	▲3.55%	▼17.90%
Source: Costa Rica's Directorate General of Civil Aviation (DGAC). Statistical Yearbooks (Years 2000-2005, 2006, 2007, 2008, and 2009 )

== See also ==
- Transport in Costa Rica
- List of airports in Costa Rica
