= Bahía Drake Airport =

Bahía Drake Airport Drake Bay Airport
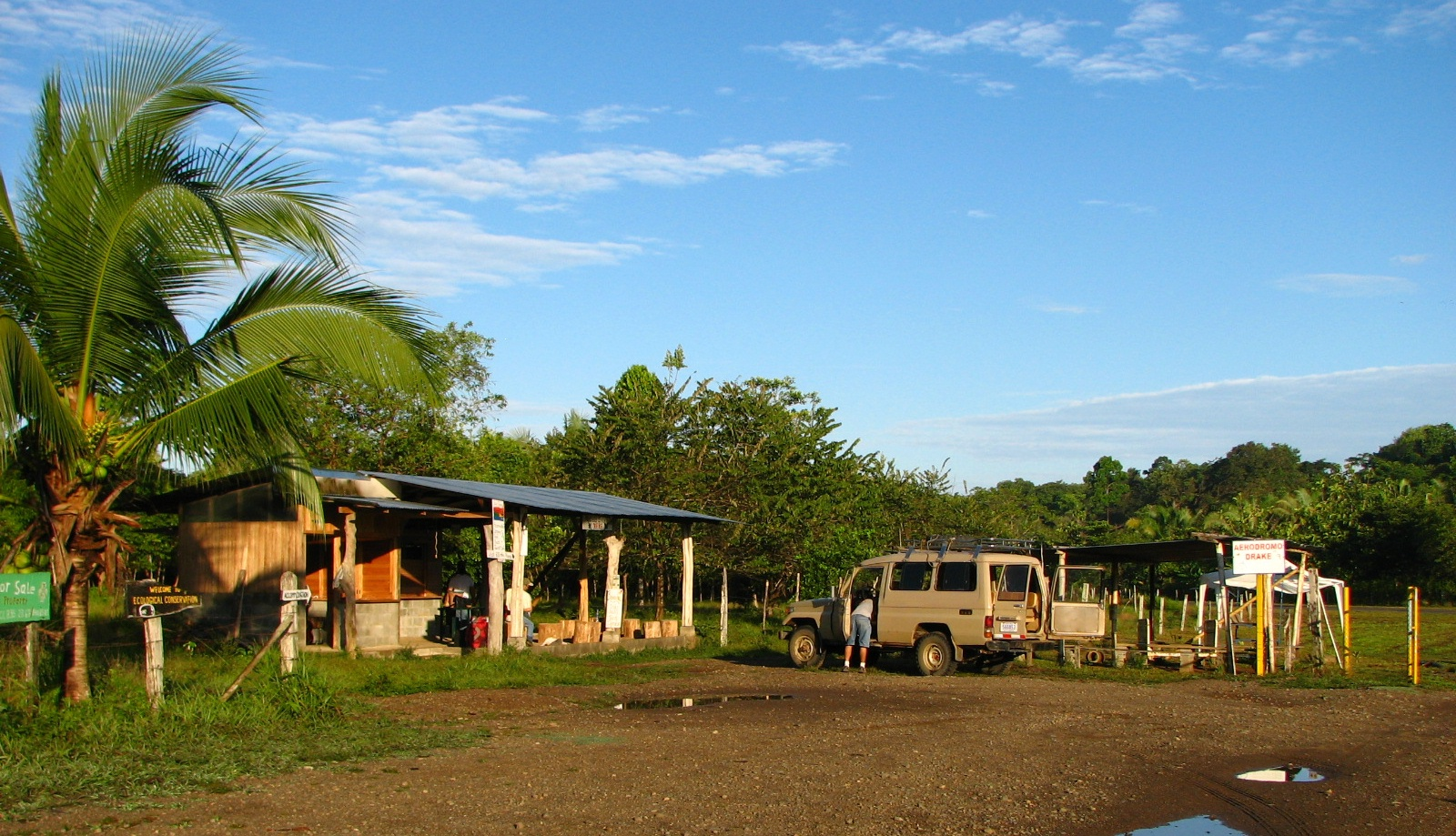
- IATA: DRK; ICAO: MRDK

Summary
- Airport type: Public
- Operator: DGAC
- Serves: Bahía Drake, Costa Rica
- Elevation AMSL: 26 ft / 8 m
- Coordinates: 8°43′08″N 83°38′30″W

Map
- Location in Costa Rica

Runways
Direction	Length		Surface
Direction	m	ft	Surface
09/27	770	2,526	Asphalt

Statistics (2014)
- Passengers: 13,438
- Passenger change 13–14: ▲21.4%
- Source: AIP GCM SkyVector

Bahía Drake Airport (IATA: DRK, ICAO: MRDK) is an airport serving Bahía Drake, a Pacific coastal district with a long tradition as a tourist destination in Osa Canton, Puntarenas Province, Costa Rica. The airport is also known as Drake Bay Airport.

The airport is located in the Bahía Drake District on the coast 4 kilometres (2 mi) northeast of Agujitas de Drake, the largest village in the area. It is operated by Costa Rica's Directorate General of Civil Aviation (DGAC).

== Airlines and destinations ==
Airlines	Destinations
Aerobell Airlines	Puerto Jimenez, San José–Tobías Bolaños
Sansa Airlines	Puerto Jimenez, San José–Juan Santamaría

== Passenger Statistics ==
These data show number of passengers movements into the airport, according to the Directorate General of Civil Aviation of Costa Rica's Statistical Yearbooks.

Year	2016	2017	2018	2019	2020	2021	2022	2023
Passengers	5,250	15,958	6,525	18,607	7,956	11,808	T.B.A.	T.B.A.
Growth (%)	▲16.37%	▲4.64%	▼59.11%	▲185.17%	▼57.24%	▲48.42%	T.B.A.	T.B.A.
Source: Costa Rica's Directorate General of Civil Aviation (DGAC). Statistical Yearbooks (Years 2006–2021)

Year	2008	2009	2010	2011	2012	2013	2014	2015
Passengers	13,935	10,747	9,552	9,267	9,927	11,073	13,438	13,105
Growth (%)	▲0.47%	▼22.88%	▼11.12%	▼2.98%	▲7.12%	▲11.54%	▲21.36%	▼2.47%
Source: Costa Rica's Directorate General of Civil Aviation (DGAC). Statistical Yearbooks (Years 2008, 2009, 2010, 2011, 2012, 2013, and 2014)

Year	2000	2001	2002	2003	2004	2005	2006	2007
Passengers	2,560	1,736	3,570	7,565	11,208	12,408	11,401	13,870
Growth (%)	N.A.	▼32.19%	▲105.65%	▲111.90%	▲48.16%	▲10.71%	▼8.12%	▲21.66%
Source: Costa Rica's Directorate General of Civil Aviation (DGAC). Statistical Yearbooks (Years 2000-2005, 2006, and 2007,)

== See also ==
- Transport in Costa Rica
- List of airports in Costa Rica
