= PMZ =

PMZ or pmz may refer to:

- Palmar Sur Airport, Osa Canton, Puntarenas Province, Costa Rica, by IATA airport code
- Plymouth Municipal Airport (North Carolina), Washington County, North Carolina, United States, by FAA LID airport code
- Southern Pame language, Mexico, by ISO 639-3 language code
