= KPMZ =

KPMZ may refer to:

- KTCK-FM, a radio station (96.7 FM) licensed to Flower Mound, Texas, United States known as KPMZ from 2008 to 2010
- ICAO code for Plymouth Municipal Airport (North Carolina) in Plymouth, North Carolina, United States
