= Tobías Bolaños International Airport =

Tobías Bolaños International Airport Aeropuerto Internacional Tobías Bolaños
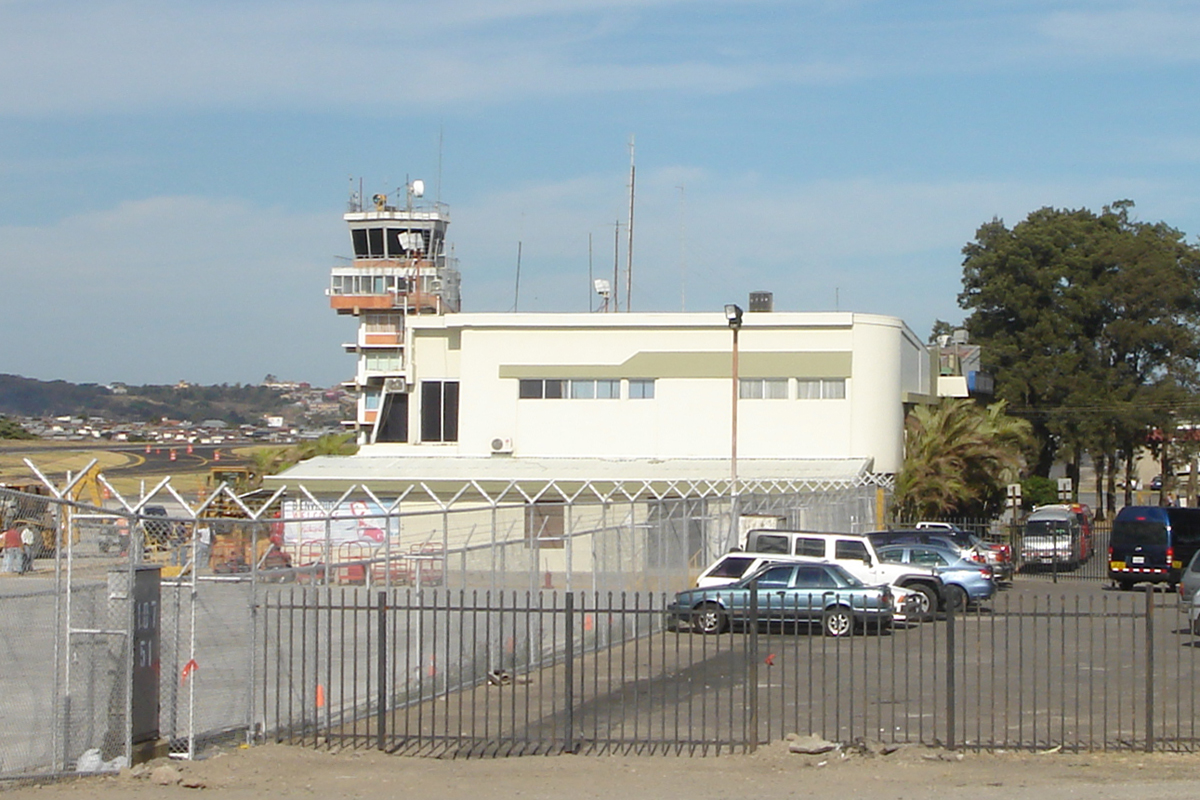
- IATA: SYQ; ICAO: MRPV

Summary
- Airport type: Public
- Operator: Dirección General de Aviación Civil
- Serves: San José, Costa Rica
- Location: San José, Costa Rica
- Elevation AMSL: 3,287 ft (1,002 m)
- Coordinates: 9°57′26″N 84°08′22″W

Map
- Location in Costa Rica

Runways
| Direction | Length | | Surface |
| Direction | m | ft | Surface |
|---|---|---|---|
| 10/28 | 1,620 | 5,315 | Asphalt |

Statistics (2017)
- Passengers: 32,164
- Passenger change 13–14: ▲27.2%
- Source: AIP GCM SkyVector

Tobías Bolaños International Airport (Spanish: Aeropuerto Internacional Tobías Bolaños) (IATA: SYQ, ICAO: MRPV) is one of the four international airports in Costa Rica, and the secondary airport serving the city of San José, after Juan Santamaría International Airport. It is located in downtown San José, in Pavas District, San José Canton. The airport is named for Costa Rican pilot Tobias Bolaños Palma (1892-1953).

The airport has one runway (1566mx23m). It lies at an elevation of 1002 meters AMSL. The airport has no instrument approach procedures and can only accept VFR flights.

This airport is the main base for general aviation in the country, as well as most private flight operations, charter flights, tourism, and aviation schools.

== Charter Flights ==
While there are no schedule commercial flight operators, several air taxi and charter companies operate from Tobías Bolanos International Airport and serving regional airport and remote strips throughout Costa Rica, as well as several international destinations.

Costa Rica Destinations: Altagracia, Barra del Tortuguero, Batán, Golfito, Guápiles, La Fortuna (Arenal), Los Sueños, Nosara, Palmar Sur, Puerto Jimenez, Punta Islita, Quepos La Managua, San Isidro del General,Tamarindo, Tambor, Zona Franca América, and others.

Operators carrying dimestic passanges from the airport in 2022 included VEASA, Prestige Wings, Líneas Aréreas Trans'Costa Rica, Aerotours, Aero Caribe, CarmonAir, Helijet Aviation, Vola Helicópetros and Aires de Pavas.

== Aviation schools ==
There are eight flight schools operating out of Tobías Bolaños International Airport. Some offer additional aviation courses such as cabin crew training and dispatcher training. They have varying fleets of single and multi-engine aircraft for Ab initio pilot training.

- AENSA - Academia de Ensenanza Aeronautica
- Aerobell Flight School
- Aeroformacion
- Aerotica
- CPEA - Centro Profesional de Enseñanza Aeronáutica
- ECDEA - Escuela Costarricense de Aviacion (Part of CarmonAir and Costa Rica Green Airways)
- IACA - Instituto Aeronautico Centroamericano
- IFA - Instituto de Formacion Aeronautica

== Passenger statistics ==
These data show number of passenger movements into the airport, according to the Directorate General of Civil Aviation of Costa Rica's Statistical Yearbooks.

| Year | 2010 | 2011 | 2012 | 2013 | 2014 | 2015 | 2016 | 2017 |
|---|---|---|---|---|---|---|---|---|
| Passengers | 101,573 | 93,048 | 84,194 | 89,737 | 18,531 | 15,754 | 25,293 | 32,164 |
| Growth (%) | ▼2.65% | ▼8.39% | ▼9.52% | ▲6.58% | ▼79.35% | ▼14.99% | ▲60.55% | ▲27.17% |
Source: Costa Rica's Directorate General of Civil Aviation (DGAC). Statistical Yearbooks (Years 2010, 2011, 2012, 2013, and 2014)

| Year | 2000 | 2001 | 2002 | 2003 | 2004 | 2005 | 2006 | 2007 | 2008 | 2009 |
|---|---|---|---|---|---|---|---|---|---|---|
| Passengers | 15,598 | 39,606 | 46,320 | 62,745 | 85,484 | 87,650 | 95,356 | 120,617 | 128,106 | 104,343 |
| Growth (%) | N.A. | ▲153.92% | ▲16.95% | ▲35.46% | ▲36.24% | ▲2.53% | ▲8.79% | ▲26.49% | ▲6.21% | ▼18.55% |
Source: Costa Rica's Directorate General of Civil Aviation (DGAC). Statistical Yearbooks (Years 2000-2005, 2006, 2007, 2008, and 2009)

== See also ==
- Transport in Costa Rica
- List of airports in Costa Rica
