= SANSA (airline) =

Regional airline based in Costa Rica

IATA	ICAO	Call sign
RZ	LRS	SANSA
- Founded: 1978
- Hubs: Juan Santamaría International Airport
- Fleet size: 10
- Destinations: 14
- Parent company: Regional Airlines Holding LLC
- Headquarters: San José, Costa Rica
- Website: www.flysansa.com

SANSA (Servicios Aéreos Nacionales S.A.) is a regional airline based in San José, Costa Rica. It operates scheduled passenger services as part of the former TACA Regional system, and was a subsidiary of Avianca Holdings. Its main hub is Juan Santamaría International Airport.

== History ==
The airline was established in 1978 as a domestic subsidiary of LACSA.

On May 31, 2019, Avianca Holdings sold SANSA to Regional Airlines Holding LLC, from Delaware, United States.

== Destinations ==
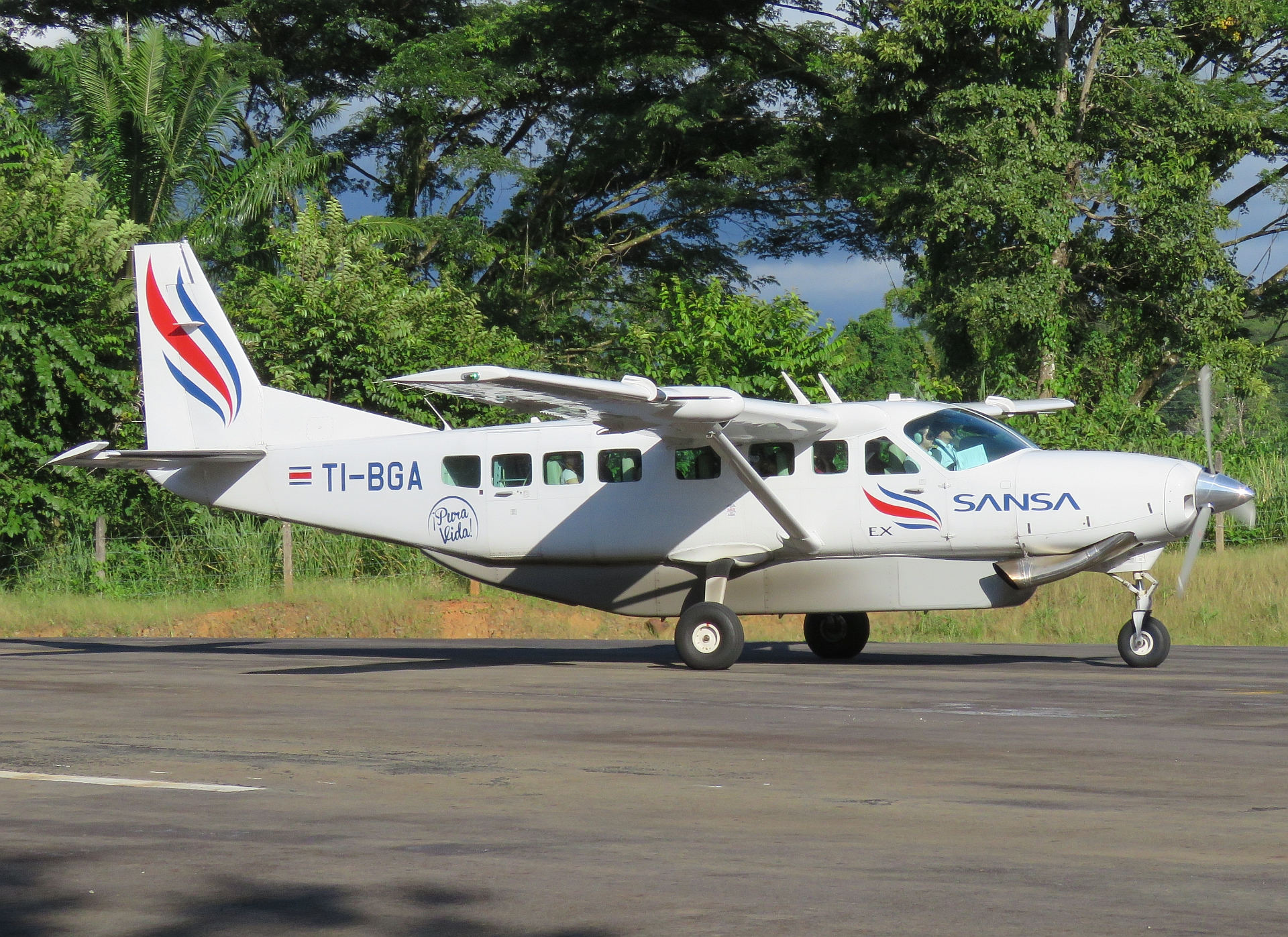
A SANSA Cessna 208B Grand Caravan at Quepos La Managua Airport in 2015

The destinations of SANSA are:

As of 2026, the airline operates 13 domestic flights and 2 international flights to the neighboring countries including Managua, Nicaragua and Bocas del Toro, Panama

Country	City	Airport	Notes	Refs
Costa Rica	Bahía Drake	Bahía Drake Airport		
Costa Rica	Barra del Colorado	Barra del Colorado Airport	Terminated	
Costa Rica	Coto 47	Coto 47 Airport	Terminated	
Costa Rica	Golfito	Golfito Airport		
Costa Rica	La Fortuna	La Fortuna Arenal Airport		
Costa Rica	Liberia	Daniel Oduber Quirós International Airport		
Costa Rica	Limón	Limón International Airport		
Costa Rica	Nosara	Nosara Airport		
Costa Rica	Palmar Sur	Palmar Sur Airport		
Costa Rica	Puerto Carrillo	Carrillo Airport	Terminated	
Costa Rica	Puerto Jiménez	Puerto Jiménez Airport		
Costa Rica	Punta Islita	Punta Islita Airport	Terminated	
Costa Rica	Quepos	Quepos La Managua Airport		
Costa Rica	San Isidro de El General	San Isidro de El General Airport	Terminated	
Costa Rica	San José	Juan Santamaría International Airport	Hub	
Costa Rica	Tamarindo	Tamarindo Airport		
Costa Rica	Tambor	Tambor Airport		
Costa Rica	Tortuguero	Tortuguero Airport		
Panama	Bocas del Toro	José Ezequiel Hall International Airport		
Nicaragua	Managua	Augusto C. Sandino International Airport		
Nicaragua	Tola	Costa Esmeralda Airport	Terminated	

== Fleet ==
=== Current fleet ===
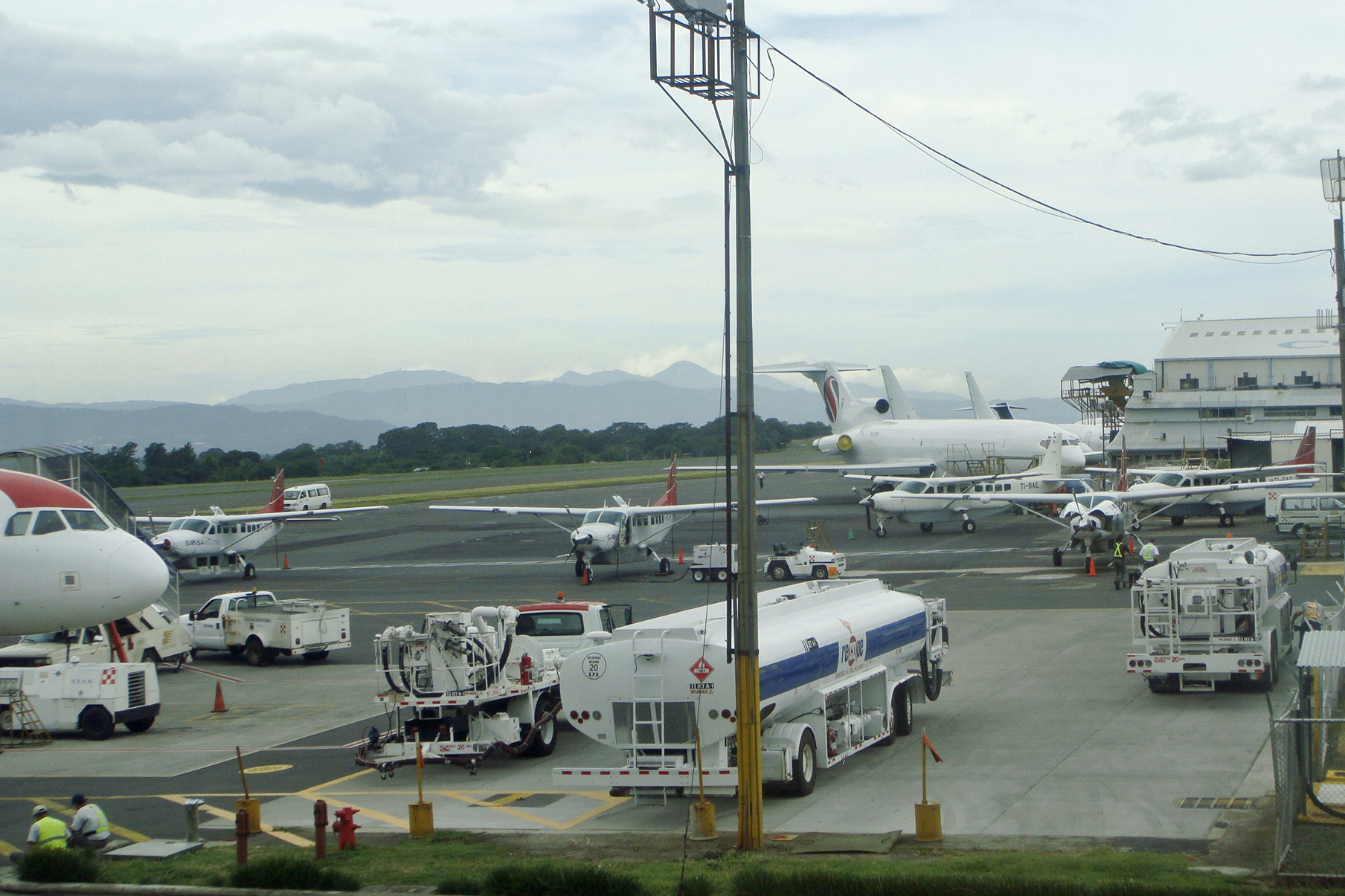
SANSA's operations area at Juan Santamaría International Airport, next to the main terminal

As of September 2022, the SANSA fleet includes:

SANSA fleet
Aircraft	In service	Orders	Passengers	Notes
Cessna 208B Grand Caravan	10	—	14	
Total	10	—		

=== Former fleet ===
- 1 Boeing 737-300 (Leased from Islandsflug)
- 3 Douglas C-47 Skytrain
- 3 CASA C-212 Aviocar

== Accidents and incidents ==
- On April 19, 1984, a Douglas C-47 (registered TI-SAA), charter flight coming from San Andrés, Colombia crashed on "Cerro Santa Rosa" (northwest face of the Irazú Volcano), with the death of all 4 people on board.
- On January 16, 1990, SANSA Flight 32 crashed into the Cerro Cedral, a mountain in Costa Rica, after takeoff from Juan Santamaría International Airport in San José. All 20 passengers and 3 crew on board died in the crash.
- On August 26, 2000, a Cessna 208B Grand Caravan crashed into the Arenal Volcano, an active volcano in Costa Rica. The Cessna Caravan took off from Juan Santamaría International Airport in San José at 11:38, for a flight to Tamarindo. An intermediate stop at La Fortuna was made at 11:55 to drop off a Japanese tourist. The flight left La Fortuna again at 12:05 for a 35-minute flight to Tamarindo. The aircraft collided with the active 5380 feet (1650 m) high Arenal volcano, at around 656 feet (200 m) below the crater. All 8 passengers and 2 crew on board died in the crash.
- On November 28, 2001, a Cessna 208B Grand Caravan crashed into the Cerro Chontal, a mountain in Costa Rica. The aircraft crashed into a wooded hillside of the Cerro Chontal approximately four minutes before it was expected to land. The aircraft appeared to be off the usual approach track for Quepos. Both crew members and 1 passenger died; 5 passengers survived the crash and were rescued the next day.
