= Flight 32 =

Flight 32 may refer to:

- Overseas National Airways Flight 032, overran the runway on 12 November 1975
- SANSA Flight 32, crashed on 15 January 1990
- Qantas Flight 32, had an engine failure on 4 November 2010
