= Pérez Zeledón =

Pérez Zeledón may refer to:

- A.D. Municipal Pérez Zeledón, Costa Rican football team
- Pérez Zeledón (canton), in Costa Rica
- Pérez Zeledón Airport, in Costa Rica
