= Nosara Airport =

- IATA: NOB; ICAO: MRNS

Summary
- Airport type: Public
- Operator: DGAC
- Serves: Nosara, Costa Rica
- Elevation AMSL: 33 ft / 10 m
- Coordinates: 9°58′35″N 85°39′10″W

Map
- Location in Costa Rica

Runways
Direction	Length		Surface
Direction	m	ft	Surface
04/22	1,000	3,281	Asphalt

Statistics (2014)
- Passengers: 7350
- Passenger change 13–14: ▲10.1%
- Source: AIP GCM SkyVector

Nosara Airport (IATA: NOB, ICAO: MRNS) is an airport serving Nosara, a village in the Guanacaste Province of Costa Rica. The airport is approximately 15 minutes from the beaches of Nosara, the main tourist attraction in the area. The airport is owned and administered by the country's Directorate General of Civil Aviation (DGAC).

Nosara Airport receives only domestic flights, but has daily scheduled service from the Costa Rican capital, San José.

The airport is 3 kilometres (1.9 mi) inland from the Pacific coast. The runway length includes a 125 metres (410 ft) displaced threshold on Runway 04. There is nearby low mountainous terrain north of the airport, and also east through south.

== Airlines and destinations ==
Airlines	Destinations
Sansa Airlines	Liberia, San José–Juan Santamaría
Costa Rica Green Airways	...
CarmonAir	...

== Passenger Statistics ==
These data show number of passengers movements into the airport, according to the DGAC Statistical Yearbooks.

Year	2008	2009	2010	2011	2012	2013	2014	2015
Passengers	6,284	7,392	7,420	7,417	6,513	6,679	7,350	T.B.A.
Growth (%)	▼30.61%	▲17.63%	▲0.38%	▼0.04%	▼12.19%	▲2.55%	▲10.05%	T.B.A.
Source: Costa Rica's Directorate General of Civil Aviation (DGAC). Statistical Yearbooks (Years 2008, 2009, 2010, 2011, 2012, 2013, and 2014)

Year	2000	2001	2002	2003	2004	2005	2006	2007
Passengers	2,214	3,672	4,754	5,686	6,195	7,095	7,639	9,056
Growth (%)	N.A.	▲65.85%	▲29.47%	▲19.60%	▲8.65%	▲14.53%	▲7.67%	▲18.55%
Source: Costa Rica's Directorate General of Civil Aviation (DGAC). Statistical Yearbooks (Years 2000-2005, 2006, and 2007,)

== See also ==
- Transport in Costa Rica
- List of airports in Costa Rica
