= Nosara River =

River in Costa Rica

Rio Nosara Nosara RIver
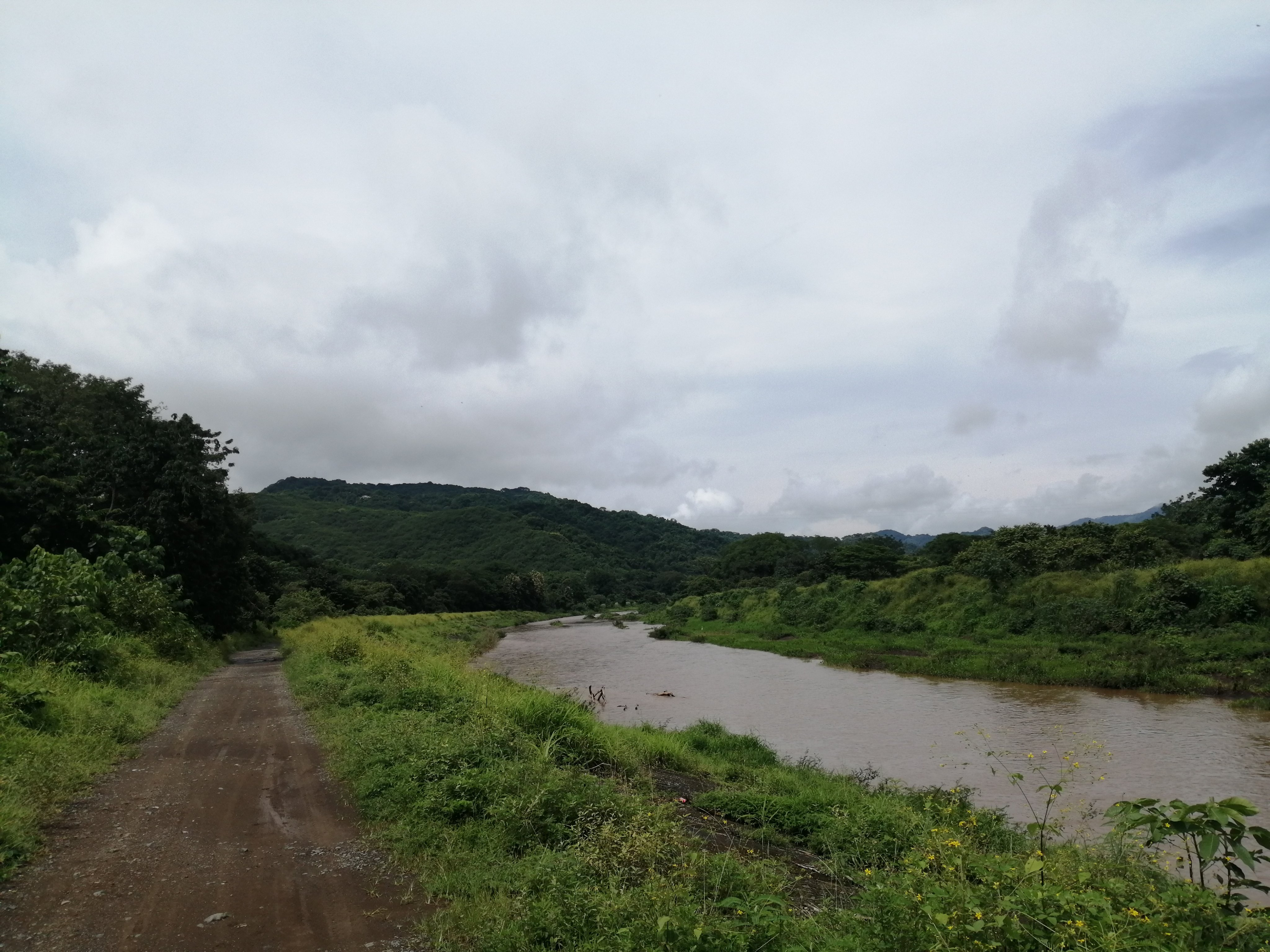
- Nosara River in the rainy season

- Location of mouth

Location
- Country: Costa Rica

Physical characteristics
- Mouth
  - coordinates: 9°57′59″N 85°40′38″W

Nosara River is a river in the village of Nosara, Costa Rica.
