= Palmar Sur Airport =

Airport in Costa Rica

- IATA: PMZ; ICAO: MRPM

Summary
- Airport type: Public
- Owner/Operator: DGAC
- Serves: Palmar Norte, Costa Rica
- Location: Palmar Sur
- Elevation AMSL: 49 ft / 15 m
- Coordinates: 08°57′04″N 083°28′07″W

Map
- Location in Costa Rica

Runways
Direction	Length		Surface
Direction	m	ft	Surface
03/21	1,400	4,593	Asphalt

Statistics (2014)
- Passengers: 4,857
- Passenger change 13–14: ▲1.3%
- Source: AIP GCM

Palmar Sur Airport (IATA: PMZ, ICAO: MRPM) is an airport serving the adjacent towns of Palmar Norte and Palmar Sur in Osa Canton, Puntarenas Province, Costa Rica.

Palmar Norte and Palmar Sur are divided by the Térraba River at its exit from the coastal mountain range, 17 kilometres (11 mi) inland from the Pacific Ocean. The airport is on the southern bank, and north approach and departure cross the river. There is a mountain immediately north of Palmar Norte, and mountainous terrain northwest through northeast of the airport.

The airport is owned and administered by the country's Directorate General of Civil Aviation (DGAC), and is currently served by one daily scheduled flight from San José, plus frequent charter services.

Taxis are available outside the airport. By bus, it costs approximately US$0.20 to Palmar Norte or US$0.60 to Sierpe. It is often used by travelers and tourists who are visiting Sierpe, San Buenaventura, Chontales, Ojochal, and Uvita.

In July, 2018, the airport was closed for major renovations and enhancements. The airport was scheduled to re-open in January 2019.

The airport officially reopened in August 2019. Costa Rica President Carlos Alvarado Quesada attended celebrating the re-opening of Palmar Sur Airport, on August 23, 2019.

== Airlines and destinations ==
Airlines	Destinations
Sansa Airlines	San José–Juan Santamaría

== Passenger Statistics ==
These data show number of passengers movements into the airport, according to the Directorate General of Civil Aviation of Costa Rica's Statistical Yearbooks.

Year	2008	2009	2010	2011	2012	2013	2014	2015
Passengers	11,773	8,050	6,785	5,043	4,104	4,794	4,857	T.B.A.
Growth (%)	▼12.86%	▼31.62%	▼15.71%	▼25.67%	▼18.62%	▲16.81%	▲1.31%	T.B.A.
Source: Costa Rica's Directorate General of Civil Aviation (DGAC). Statistical Yearbooks (Years 2008, 2009, 2010, 2011, 2012, 2013, and 2014)

Year	2000	2001	2002	2003	2004	2005	2006	2007
Passengers	8,538	10,592	8,356	8,190	8,000	9,482	17,667	13,511
Growth (%)	N.A.	▲24.06%	▼21.11%	▼1.99%	▼2.32%	▲18.53%	▲86.32%	▼23.52%
Source: Costa Rica's Directorate General of Civil Aviation (DGAC). Statistical Yearbooks (Years 2000-2005, 2006, and 2007,)

== See also ==
- Transport in Costa Rica
- List of airports in Costa Rica
