= Guanacaste Airport =

Airport in Guanacaste Province, Costa Rica

Daniel Oduber Quirós International Airport Aeropuerto Internacional Daniel Oduber Quirós
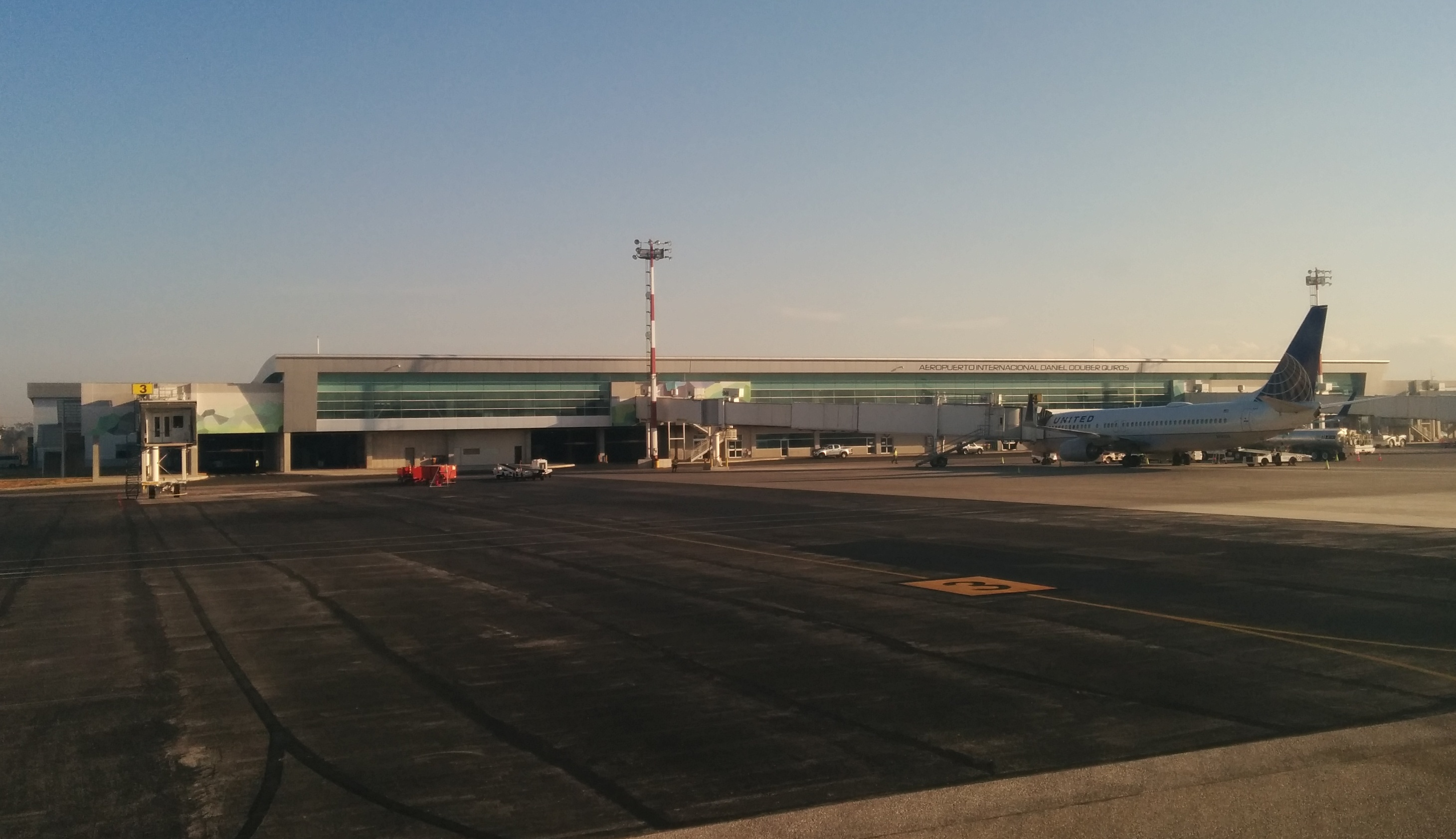
- IATA: LIR; ICAO: MRLB

Summary
- Airport type: Public
- Owner: Government of Costa Rica
- Operator: Coriport S.A.
- Serves: Liberia, Costa Rica
- Elevation AMSL: 269 ft (82 m)
- Coordinates: 10°35′35″N 85°32′44″W
- Website: www.guanacastecrairport.com

Map
- Location in Costa Rica

Runways
Direction	Length		Surface
Direction	m	ft	Surface
07/25	2,750	9,022	Asphalt

Statistics (2024)
- Passengers: 1,921,345
- Passenger change 23–24: ▲16.1%
- Aircraft movements: 27,643
- Movements change 23–24: ▲17.3%
- Source: AIP DGAC SkyVector Google Maps

Daniel Oduber Quirós International Airport (IATA: LIR, ICAO: MRLB) — also known as Guanacaste Airport and Liberia International Airport — is one of four international airports in Costa Rica. It sits 11 kilometres (7 mi; 6 nmi) west-southwest of the city of Liberia in Guanacaste Province, and serves as a tourism hub for those who visit the Pacific coast and western Costa Rica. The facility covers 243 hectares (600 acres) of land and has a single 2,750-metre (9,022 ft) runway that can handle wide-body aircraft, including the Boeing 747.

== History ==
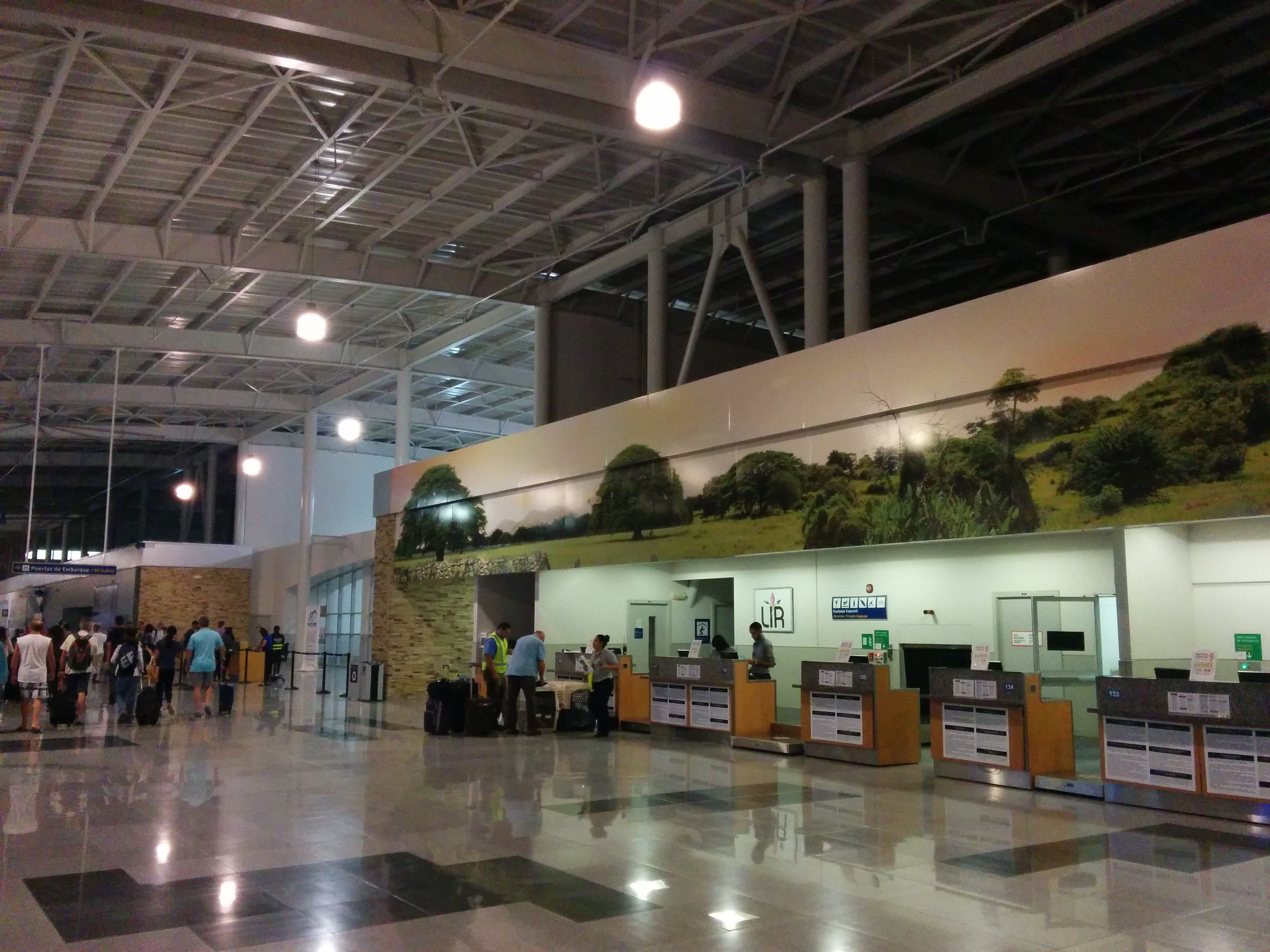
Main building interior, passenger check-in area

The idea for an airport in Guanacaste Province was conceived during the government of Daniel Oduber Quirós (1974–1978). The airport was initially named "Llano Grande", after the surrounding area, then renamed "Aeropuerto Tomas Guardia," and finally honor Quirós for his work for the province of Guanacaste. Today, most people call it "Liberia International Airport", and in 2021 the name was changed to Guanacaste Airport for branding purposes.

In October 1995, the airport was re-inaugurated as an international airport. To support this expansion of operations, the pavement on the runway was redone and special landing lights were installed. Also a firefighter station was added to comply with FAA and international regulations. Initial response from commercial airlines to the expansion was timid; after one year, however, the airport went from having only one weekly charter flight to one almost every day.

In 2006, to manage increased demand of the airport, the government and local tourism chamber boards set aside funds to increase the parking capacity of the tarmac from five to eight airplanes, and for the construction of a parallel taxiway. The government made it clear that the solutions were only temporary and that a private company would need to be contracted to expand and operate the airport in the future. Also in 2007 a new waiting area and airport counters were opened, the airport was by then receiving more than 180,000 visitors yearly.

== Expanded terminal and new operator ==
In the 2010s, the government of Costa Rica awarded CORIPORT, S.A., a 20-year concession to design, finance, construct and operate a new terminal building and associated facilities on about 36,000 m^{2} (390,000 sq ft) of land then occupied by the existing terminal and associated facilities. CORIPORT's shareholders include MMM Aviation Group, Emperador Pez Espada S.R.L., Inversiones Cielo Claro LTDA, Cocobolo Inversiones S.R.L., and ADC&HAS Airports Worldwide. The latter is the project's operator.

The new 23,000 m^{2} (250,000 sq ft) terminal building has a contemporary design that is larger and more efficient than the old one. Construction started on 19 October 2010; the terminal opened on 12 January 2012. Another expansion, built from January to November 2017, added space for five more airlines.

== Airlines and destinations ==
Airlines	Destinations
Air Canada	Toronto–Pearson; Seasonal: Montréal–Trudeau, Vancouver (begins 14 December 2026)
Air Transat	Montréal–Trudeau; Toronto–Pearson
Alaska Airlines	Los Angeles; Seasonal: San Francisco, Seattle/Tacoma
American Airlines	Charlotte, Dallas/Fort Worth, Miami; Seasonal: Chicago–O'Hare, New York–JFK, Philadelphia
Delta Air Lines	Atlanta, Los Angeles; Seasonal: Boston, Detroit, Minneapolis/St. Paul, New York–JFK (resumes 19 December 2026)
Edelweiss Air	Seasonal: Zurich
JetBlue	Fort Lauderdale, New York–JFK; Seasonal: Boston
Porter Airlines	Seasonal: Ottawa, Toronto–Pearson
Sansa Airlines	Nosara, Quepos, San José–Juan Santamaría, Tamarindo, Tambor
Southwest Airlines	Houston–Hobby; Seasonal: Baltimore, Denver, Nashville
Sun Country Airlines	Seasonal: Dallas/Fort Worth, Minneapolis/St. Paul
United Airlines	Houston–Intercontinental; Seasonal: Chicago–O'Hare, Denver, Los Angeles, Newark, San Francisco
WestJet	Calgary, Montréal–Trudeau, Toronto–Pearson; Seasonal: Vancouver, Winnipeg

== Statistics ==
=== Traffic figures ===
LIR passenger totals, 2000–present (thousands)
Source: Directorate General of Civil Aviation

	Number of passengers	Percentage change	Number of movements	Percentage change
2000	91,206	–	9,095	–
2001	87,145	▼4.45%	6,347	▼30.21%
2002	61,948	▼28.91%	6,467	▲1.89%
2003	98,495	▲59.00%	7,089	▲9.62%
2004	203,823	▲106.94%	9,955	▲40.43%
2005	303,171	▲48.74%	12,754	▲28.12%
2006	391,567	▲29.16%	13,852	▲8.61%
2007	423,327	▲8.11%	14,592	▲5.34%
2008	442,902	▲4.62%	16,615	▲13.86%
2009	396,188	▼10.55%	12,716	▼23.47%
2010	311,009	▼21.50%	11,720	▼7.83%
2011	539,610	▲73.50%	11,695	▼0.21%
2012	668,762	▲23.93%	13,005	▲11.20%
2013	680,355	▲1.73%	14,059	▲8.10%
2014	779,757	▲14.61%	15,366	▲9.30%
2015	878,365	▲12.65%	19,468	▲26.70%
2016	1,146,163	▲30.49%	20,758	▲6.63%
2017	1,092,483	▼4.68%	21,037	▲1.34%
2018	1,116,810	▲2.19%	20,799	▼1.14%
2019	1,148,811	▲2.87%	19,630	▼5.62%
2020	453,877	▼60.49%	10,096	▼48.57%
2021	771,986	▲70.09%	18,446	▲82.71%
2022	1,392,698	▲80.40%	21,405	▲16.04%
2023	1,655,207	▲18.85%	23,571	▲10.12%
2024	1,921,345	▲16.08%	27,643	▲17.28%
Source: Directorate General of Civil Aviation of Costa Rica

=== Top international destinations ===
Busiest international routes to and from LIR (Jan. 2016 – Dec. 2016)
	Airport	Arrivals	Departures	Total	2015-2016	Carriers
1	Houston, United States^{1}	151,602	147,711	299,313	▲39.95%	Southwest, United
2	Atlanta, United States	66,719	70,254	138,765	▲0.15%	Delta
3	Los Angeles, United States	66,971	70,254	134,623	▲402.19%	Alaska, Delta, Southwest
4	New York City, United States	48,778	48,293	97,071	▲33.36%	Delta, Jetblue
5	Toronto, Canada	47,338	44,787	92,125	▲7.88%	Air Canada, Air Transat, Sunwing, WestJet
6	Miami, United States	44,183	47,153	91,336	▼21.99%	American
7	Newark, United States	12,472	26,025	38,497	▼17.44%	United
8	London, United Kingdom	15,592	14,593	30,185	▲	TUI Airways
9	Dallas, United States	13,774	14,594	28,323	▼27.90%	American
10	Minneapolis, United States	13,608	14,013	27,621	▲68.81%	Delta, Sun Country
11	Chicago, United States	12,300	13,651	25,951	▲25.39%	United
12	Calgary, Canada	9,202	9,465	18,667	▲1476.6%	WestJet
13	Montreal, Canada	6,129	7,263	13,392	▼8.27%	Air Canada, Air Transat, Sunwing
14	Panama City, Panama	5,245	5,897	12,194	▼8.63%	Copa
15	Denver, United States	5,823	5,543	11,366	▲71.82%	Southwest, United
Source: Directorate General of Civil Aviation. Air Transportation Statistical Yearbook (Years 2015, and 2016). Notes:^1 United flies to Houston-Intercontinental Airport, and Southwest flies to Houston-Hobby Airport. The data here is for traffic between LIR and all airports in Houston.

== See also ==
- List of airports in Costa Rica
- Transport in Costa Rica
