= Plymouth Municipal Airport (North Carolina) =

- IATA: none; ICAO: KPMZ; FAA LID: PMZ

Summary
- Airport type: Public
- Owner: Washington County
- Serves: Plymouth, North Carolina
- Elevation AMSL: 39 ft / 12 m
- Coordinates: 35°48′39″N 076°45′30″W
- Interactive map of Plymouth Municipal Airport

Runways
Direction	Length		Surface
Direction	ft	m	Surface
3/21	5,500	1,676	Asphalt

Statistics (2008)
- Aircraft operations: 11,275
- Based aircraft: 13
- Source: Federal Aviation Administration

Plymouth Municipal Airport (ICAO: KPMZ, FAA LID: PMZ) is a county-owned, public-use airport located two nautical miles (3.7 km) south of the central business district of Plymouth, in Washington County, North Carolina, United States. According to the FAA's National Plan of Integrated Airport Systems for 2009–2013, it is classified as a general aviation airport.

Although many U.S. airports use the same three-letter location identifier for the FAA and IATA, this airport is assigned PMZ by the FAA but has no designation from the IATA (which assigned PMZ to Palmar Sur Airport in Palmar Sur, Costa Rica).

== Facilities and aircraft ==
Plymouth Municipal Airport covers an area of 390 acres (160 ha) at an elevation of 39 feet (12 m) above mean sea level. It has one runway designated 3/21 with an asphalt surface measuring 5,500 by 75 feet (1,676 x 23 m).

For the 12-month period ending November 21, 2008, the airport had 11,275 aircraft operations, an average of 30 per day: 80% general aviation, 18% military, and 2% air taxi. At that time there were 13 aircraft based at this airport: 77% single-engine, 15% multi-engine and 8% helicopter.

== See also ==
- List of airports in North Carolina
