= SANSA Flight 32 =

1990 aviation accident

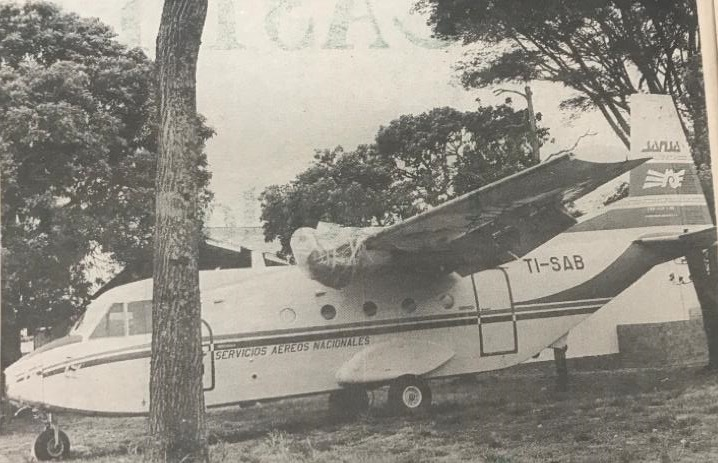
- TI-SAB, the aircraft involved, photographed in 1982

Accident
- Date: January 15, 1990
- Summary: Controlled flight into terrain, pilot error
- Site: Cerro Cedral, near Juan Santamaría International Airport, Costa Rica

Aircraft
- Aircraft type: CASA C-212 Aviocar
- Operator: SANSA
- Registration: TI-SAB
- Flight origin: Juan Santamaría International Airport
- Destination: Palmar Sur Airport
- Occupants: 23
- Passengers: 20
- Crew: 3
- Fatalities: 23
- Survivors: 0

SANSA Flight 32, a CASA C-212 Aviocar on its way to Palmar Sur Airport crashed into the Cerro Cedral, a mountain in Costa Rica after takeoff from Juan Santamaría International Airport in San Jose on January 15, 1990. All 20 passengers and 3 crew on board died in the crash.

== Accident sequence ==
SANSA Flight 32 took off from Juan Santamaria International Airport at 08:25 local time and was cleared to climb to 5500 feet. Soon after the crew received another instruction to climb to 8500 feet. Midway through the climb, the aircraft flew into Cerro Cedral at 7200 feet, killing all on board.

== Investigation ==
The investigation found that the main cause of the accident was the failure to comply with the proposed flight plan discussed with air traffic control, which would have led the aircraft to be flying under IMC conditions instead of VFR ones. Supporting factors include the lack of a Ground Proximity Warning System, pilot fatigue and a lack of a flight safety program in SANSA.
