= Palmar Norte =

Coordinates: 8°58′N 83°27′W

Palmar Norte is a town in Costa Rica, located next to Palmar Sur in the Osa region of Puntarenas Province. Although small, the town serves as a major agricultural center and as an important transit point for travelers to the Palmar Sur Airport. It is also home to the stone spheres of Costa Rica. Palmar Norte and Palmar Sur are separated by the Rio Terraba. The river overflowed during Tropical Cyclone Nate in October 2017, sweeping away houses and leaving 200 residents homeless.
