= Nosara =

District in Nicoya canton, Guanacaste province, Costa Rica

- District
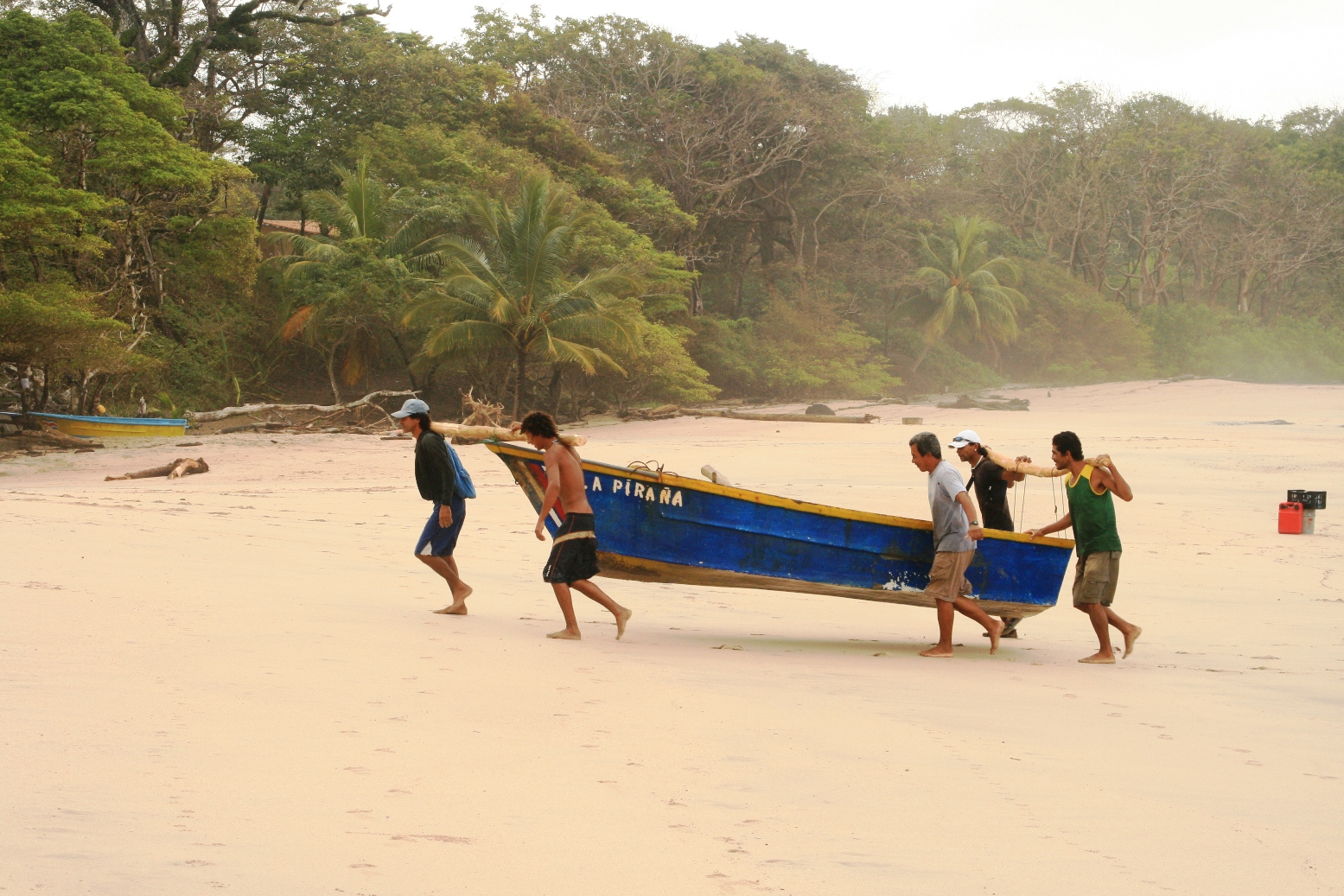
- Fisherman on the Nosara beach (Playa Nosara)
- Nosara district
- Nosara district location in Costa Rica
- Coordinates: 9.9782905°N 85.6317418°W
- Country: Costa Rica
- Province: Guanacaste
- Canton: Nicoya
- Creation: 26 January 1988

Area
  - Total: 134.57 km^{2} (51.96 sq mi)
- Elevation: 6 m (20 ft)

Population (2011)
  - Total: 4,912
  - Density: 36.50/km^{2} (94.54/sq mi)
- Time zone: UTC−06:00
- Postal code: 50206

Nosara is a district of the Nicoya canton, in the Guanacaste province of Costa Rica.

== History ==
Nosara was created on 26 January 1988 by Acuerdo 40.

== Geography ==
Despite the Nicoya peninsula being one of the last locations with large areas of unpaved roads in Costa Rica, Nosara is one of the oldest expatriate communities in the country, as well as a fishing and agricultural area.

Unlike most coastal tourist towns, Nosara lacks nearly any development directly on the beach as much of it consists of the Ostional Wildlife Refuge (necessitated by the presence of breeding olive ridley and leatherback sea turtle populations). Nosara is a surfing destination as Playa Guiones is one of the most consistent waves in the world with over 330 days per year of rideable conditions. Playa Guiones is also considered a mecca for yoga in Costa Rica and the home of several renowned yoga schools. Nearby Playa Pelada is also a popular surf spot and a hangout area for locals (known as "Ticos").

The official town center is located 6 km inland from the beach. Within "Nosara town" is the market, pharmacy, post office, churches, school, police station, David S. Kitson public library and Red Cross clinic (Nosara lacks a hospital facility). There is a Banco Popular branch located in a small commercial area near Playa Guiones.

== Demographics ==
Historical population
Census	Pop.	±% p.a.
2000	2,875	—
2011	4,912	+4.99%
2022	9,412	+6.09%
Source: Instituto Nacional de Estadística y Censos; Centro Centroamericano de Población

For the 2011 census, Nosara had a population of 4,912 inhabitants. As of 2024, this number is estimated to have almost doubled.

There are five main oceanfront communities each named after their respective beaches: Playa Nosara, Playa Guiones, Playa Pelada, Playa Garza, and Playa Ostional. These comprise the largest areas of foreign-owned residences, tourist hotels, and restaurants, centered on Guiones and Pelada. The "suburb" Esparanza de Nosara borders the Playa Guiones area, sitting between its first two beach entrances to the south. Esparanza hosts the Guiones area's largest market, a school and soccer (football) field, and a few new housing developments, hotels, and restaurants.

In 2017, Nosara was noted as the fastest-growing surf town in the world by economists from the University of Sydney, Australia, when analyzing over 5,000 surf breaks across the globe.

The Nosara River goes through the village.

== Villages ==
The administrative center of the district is the village of Bocas de Nosara.

Other villages in the district are Ángeles de Garza, Bijagua, Cabeceras de Garza, Coyoles, Cuesta Winch, Delicias, Esperanza Sur, Flores, Garza, Guiones, Ligia, Nosara, Playa Nosara, Playa Pelada, Portal, Río Montaña, Santa Marta and Santa Teresa.

== Transportation ==
=== Road transportation ===
The district is covered by the following road routes:

- National Route 160

=== Airport ===
The district is served by Nosara Airport, located only 15 minutes from Nosara beaches, served by Sansa Airlines.

There is also a taxi service from the major international airports in San Jose and Liberia.

The town is spread out and surrounded by jungle. People who live there usually get around with motorcycles, not a lot of them have cars. As a traveler, cars can be rented but it is not necessary since ATVs or golf carts are cheaper and still can get everywhere. There is also the option to call a tuk tuk, small cars that fit a maximum of three people in the back. They are used as taxis.

== Gallery ==
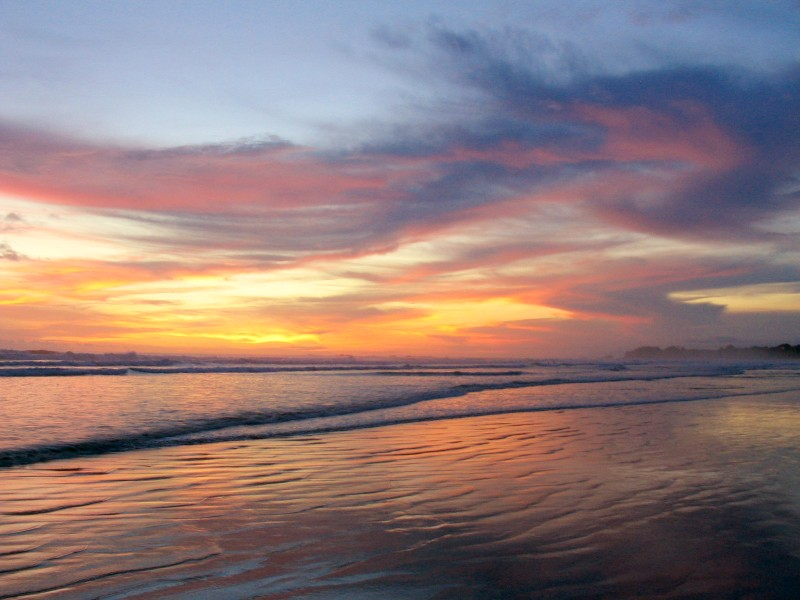
Sunset on Playa Guiones

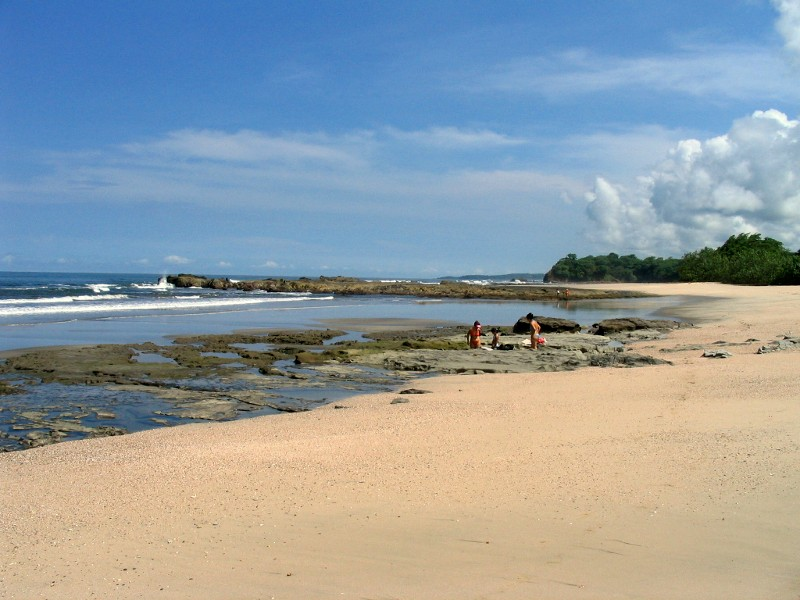
Playa Pelada

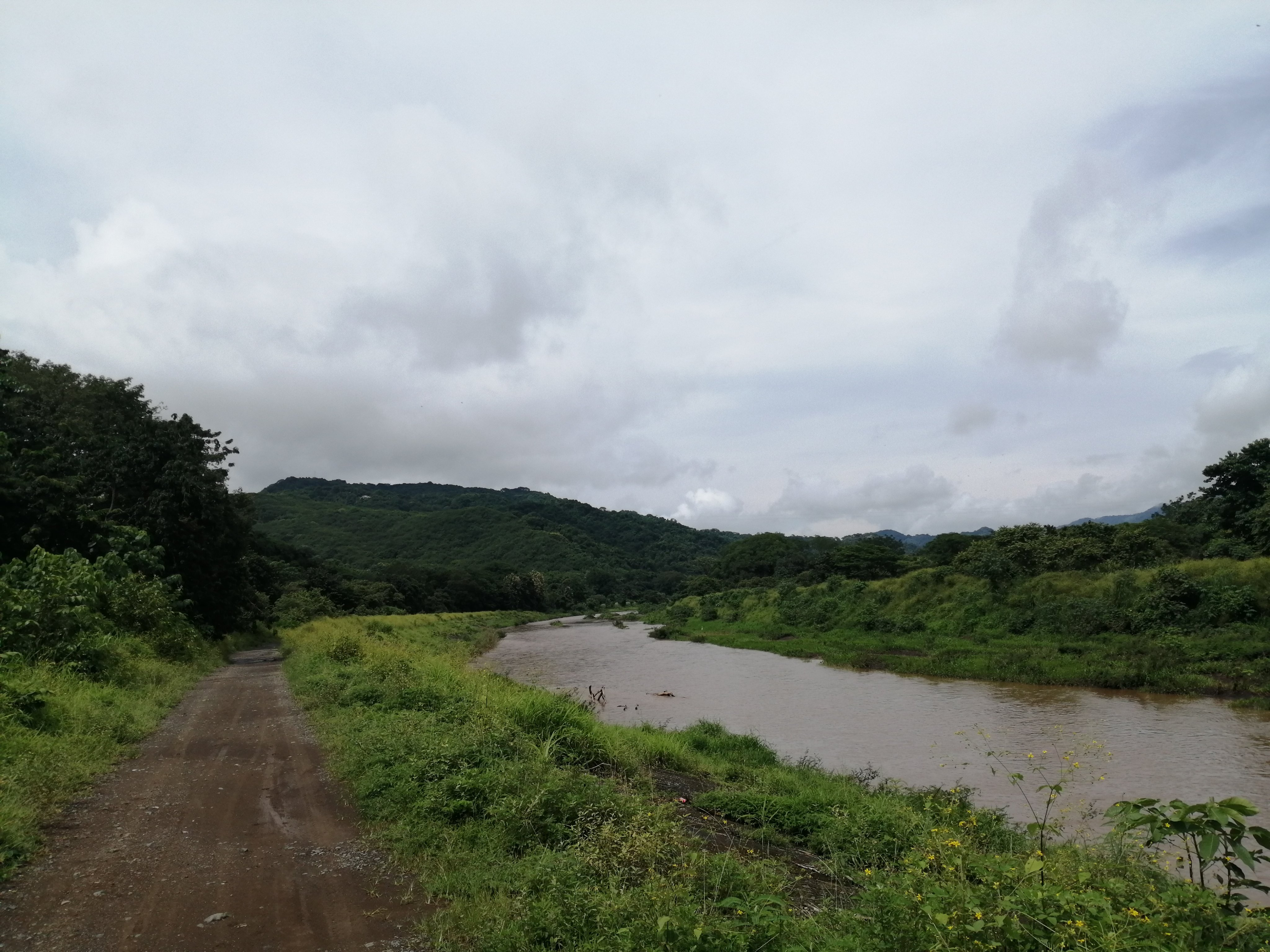
The Nosara River during the rainy season

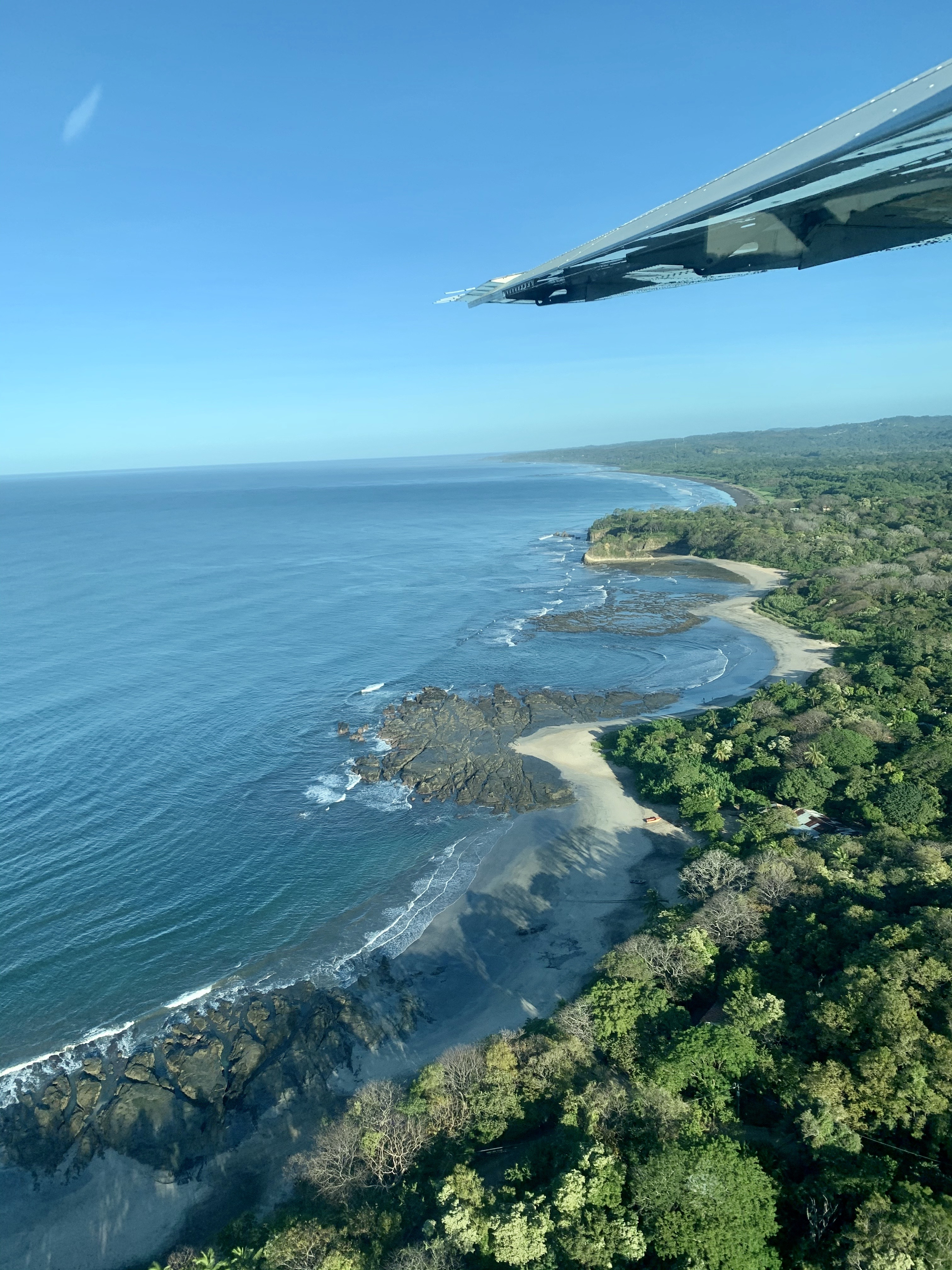
A view of the town from an airplane
