= Tortuguero Airport =

Barra de Tortuguero Airport
- IATA: TTQ; ICAO: MRBT

Summary
- Airport type: Public
- Operator: DGAC
- Serves: Tortuguero, Costa Rica
- Elevation AMSL: 7 ft (2.1 m)
- Coordinates: 10°34′10″N 83°30′55″W

Map
- Location in Costa Rica

Runways
Direction	Length		Surface
Direction	m	ft	Surface
15/33	900	2,953	Concrete

Statistics (2014)
- Passengers: 11,577
- Passenger change 13–14: ▲80.8%
- Source: AIP DGAC GCM SkyVector

Barra de Tortuguero Airport (IATA: TTQ, ICAO: MRBT), is an airport serving Tortuguero village and Tortuguero National Park in Pococí Canton, Limón Province, Costa Rica. The runway lies on a narrow strip between the Tortuguero River and the Caribbean shoreline, 3 kilometres (2 mi) northwest of Tortuguero village.

Tortuguero Airport is managed by Costa Rica's Directorate General of Civil Aviation. In 2014, the airport registered 11,577 passengers.

== Airlines and destinations ==
Airlines	Destinations
Sansa Airlines	San José–Juan Santamaría

== Passenger statistics ==
These data show number of passengers movements into the airport, according to the Directorate General of Civil Aviation of Costa Rica's Statistical Yearbooks.

Year	2008	2009	2010	2011	2012	2013	2014	2015
Passengers	11,523	7,487	7,613	6,767	5,630	6,404	11,577	T.B.A.
Growth (%)	▼10.70%	▼35.03%	▲1.68%	▼11.11%	▼16.80%	▲13.75%	▲80.78%	T.B.A.
Source: Costa Rica's Directorate General of Civil Aviation (DGAC). Statistical Yearbooks (Years 2008, 2009, 2010, 2011, 2012, 2013, and 2014)

Year	2000	2001	2002	2003	2004	2005	2006	2007
Passengers	4,694	6,488	7,824	13,381	12,506	12,133	11,048	12,904
Growth (%)	N.A.	▲38.22%	▲20.59%	▲71.03%	▼6.54%	▼2.98%	▼8.94%	▲16.80%
Source: Costa Rica's Directorate General of Civil Aviation (DGAC). Statistical Yearbooks (Years 2000-2005, 2006, and 2007,)

== See also ==
- Transport in Costa Rica
- List of airports in Costa Rica
