= San Isidro de El General Airport =

San Isidro de El General Airport Pérez Zeledón Airport
- IATA: IPZ; ICAO: MRSI

Summary
- Airport type: Public
- Operator: DGAC
- Location: San Isidro de El General, Costa Rica
- Elevation AMSL: 2,100 ft / 640 m
- Coordinates: 9°20′55″N 83°42′45″W

Map
- Location in Costa Rica

Runways
Direction	Length		Surface
Direction	m	ft	Surface
02/20	802	2,631	Asphalt

Statistics (2014)
- Passengers: 313
- Passenger change 13–14: ▲55.7%
- Source: AIP DGAC

San Isidro de El General Airport (IATA: IPZ, ICAO: MRSI) is an airport serving the city of San Isidro de El General and Pérez Zeledón county, Costa Rica. The airport is 3 kilometres (2 mi) south of downtown San Isidro.

The airport is a public airstrip managed by the country's Directorate General of Civil Aviation (DGAC). The airstrip has a terminal building constructed in 2022 but no refueling capabilities.

== Airlines and destinations ==
During late 2015, the domestic airline SANSA announced that there will be a scheduled service between San Isidro de El General Airport and San José.

You can book Private Flights with VIP Heli Services

Airlines	Destinations
Sansa Airlines	San José–Juan Santamaría

== Passenger statistics ==
These data show number of passengers movements into the airport, according to the Directorate General of Civil Aviation of Costa Rica's Statistical Yearbooks.

Year	2008	2009	2010	2011	2012	2013	2014	2015
Passengers	651	261	346	86	104	201	313	T.B.A.
Growth (%)	▲98.48%	▼59.91%	▲32.57%	▼75.11%	▲20.93%	▲93.27%	▲55.72%	T.B.A.
Source: Costa Rica's Directorate General of Civil Aviation (DGAC). Statistical Yearbooks (Years 2008, 2009, 2010, 2011, 2012, 2013, and 2014)

Year	2000	2001	2002	2003	2004	2005	2006	2007
Passengers	436	388	190	162	145	151	359	328
Growth (%)	N.A.	▼11.01%	▼51.03%	▼14.74%	▼10.49%	▲4.14%	▲137.75%	▼8.64%
Source: Costa Rica's Directorate General of Civil Aviation (DGAC). Statistical Yearbooks (Years 2000-2005, 2006, and 2007,)

== See also ==
- Transport in Costa Rica
- List of airports in Costa Rica
