= Térraba River =

River in Costa Rica that flows to the Pacific Ocean

Térraba River Río Térraba
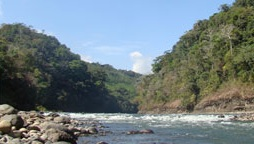
- Térraba River

- Location of mouth

Location
- Country: Costa Rica

Physical characteristics
- Mouth
  - location: Pacific Ocean
  - coordinates: 9°01′56″N 83°37′36″W

Térraba River (Spanish: Río Grande de Térraba), in the southern Brunca region of Costa Rica, is the largest river in that country.

The indigenous Boruca language name is Diquís which means "great river". Its basin is 5,085 square kilometres (1,963 sq mi) and it is 160 kilometres (99 mi) long, covering ten percent of the country. It is a tributary from the confluence of the Río General and Río Coto Brus. Pineapple plantations occupy 10,815 hectares (26,720 acres) in the basin, amounting to 21 percent of national production. Mangrove cockles (Anadara tuberculosa and Anadara similis), known locally as piangua, are collected in the mangrove swamps and mud at the mouth of the Río Grande de Térraba.

The Interamerican Highway partially follows the river course and crosses it with a bridge. Along the river lie the villages of Palmar Norte, Palmar Sur and Ciudad Cortés. The Térraba empties in the Pacific Ocean with six mouths: Mala, Brava, Chica, Zacate, Guarumal and Sierpe. A nationally protected wetland, Humedal Nacional Térraba-Sierpe (Térraba-Sierpe National Wetlands) is situated here in the mangroves along the coast.

A proposed project to provide renewable energy to the region, El Diquís Hydroelectric Project, was cancelled. It would have covered 7,000 hectares (17,000 acres) and required the relocation of 1,500 people.
