= Palmar Sur =

Town in Costa Rica

Coordinates: 8°58′N 83°27′W

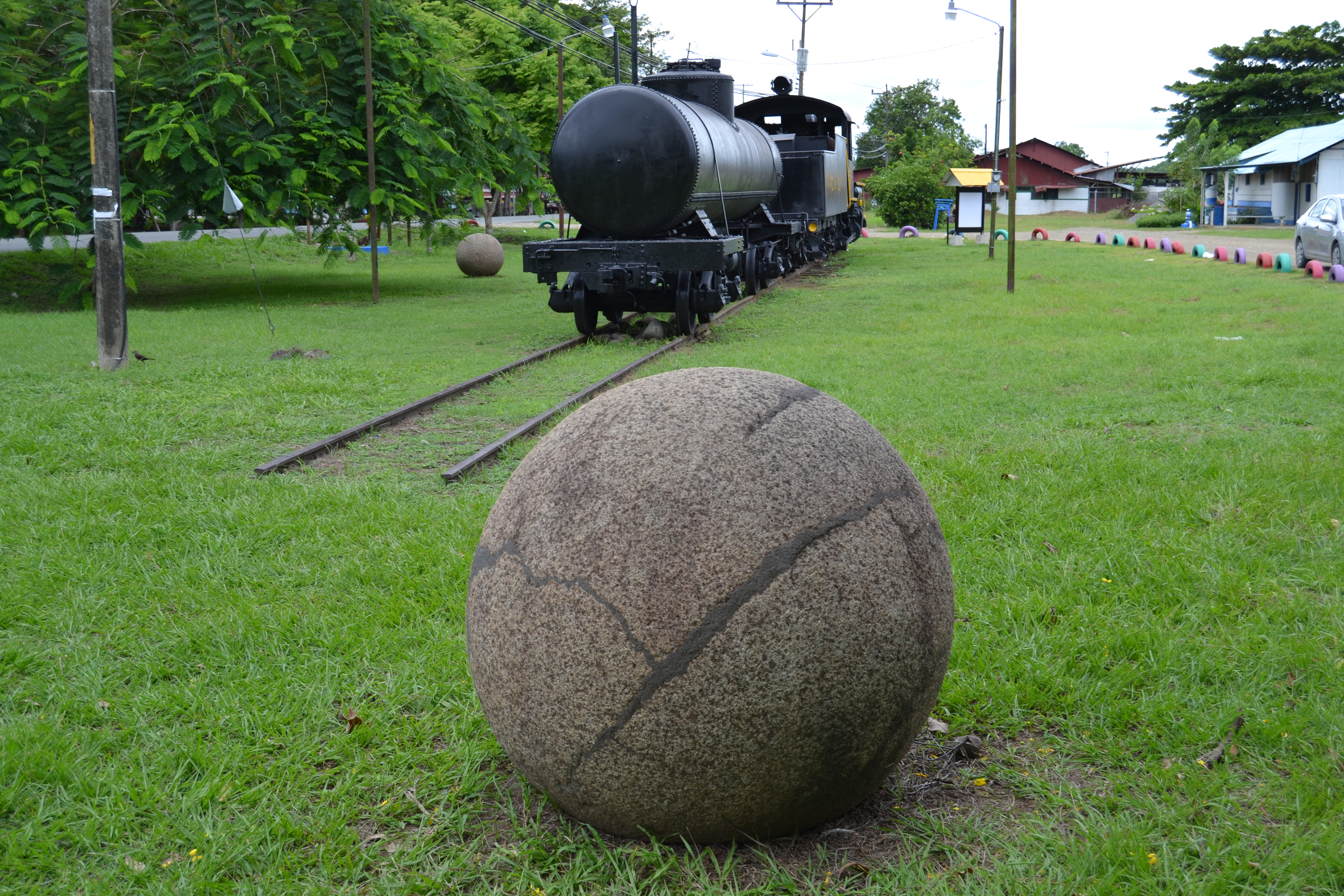
Pre-Columbian Stone Spheres at Palmar Sur

Palmar Sur is a town in Costa Rica, located next to Palmar Norte in the Osa region of Puntarenas Province of Costa Rica. Palmar Norte and Palmar Sur are separated by the Rio Terraba. Palmar Sur has a regional airport that has daily flights arriving from San Jose on two regional airlines (Sansa and Nature Air).
