= Quepos La Managua Airport =

La Managua Airport
- IATA: XQP; ICAO: MRQP

Summary
- Airport type: Public
- Operator: DGAC
- Serves: Quepos, Costa Rica
- Elevation AMSL: 85 ft / 26 m
- Coordinates: 9°26′35″N 84°07′48″W

Map
- Location in Costa Rica

Runways
Direction	Length		Surface
Direction	m	ft	Surface
04/22	1,340	4,396	Asphalt

Statistics (2017)
- Passengers: 35,752
- Passenger change 16–17: ▲5.2%
- Source: AIP GCM SkyVector

La Managua Airport (IATA: XQP, ICAO: MRQP) is an airport approximately 3 kilometres (2 mi) east of the Pacific coastal city of Quepos, Costa Rica, serving this city as well as the Manuel Antonio National Park and other tourist attractions in the central part of Puntarenas Province. The airport is named for the La Managua barrio where it is located. The airport is owned and managed by the country's Directorate General of Civil Aviation (DGAC).

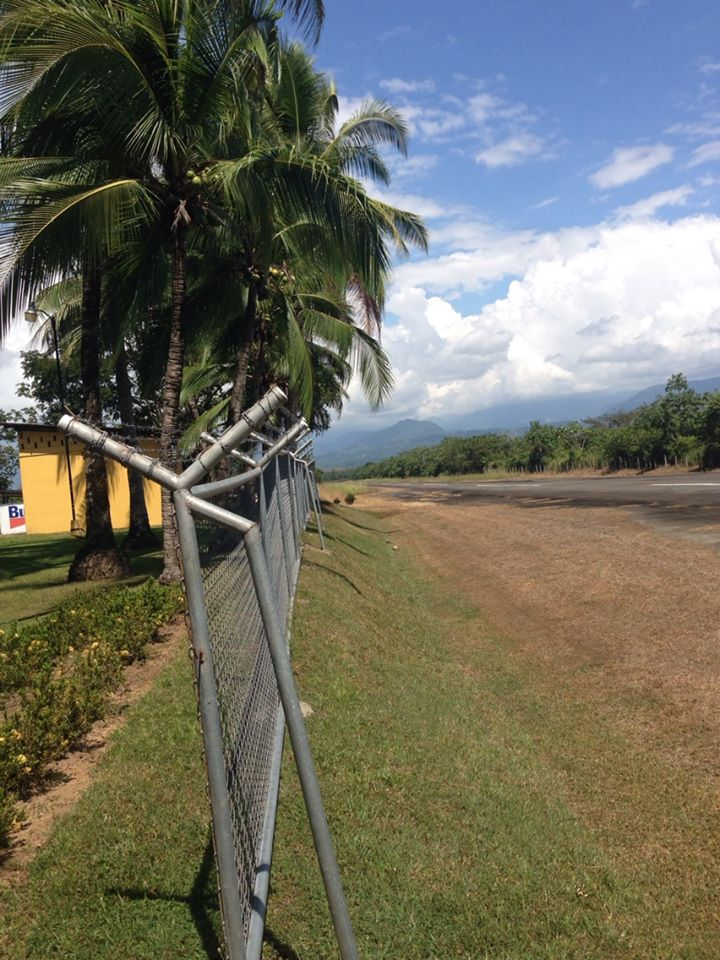
Quepos Airport runway

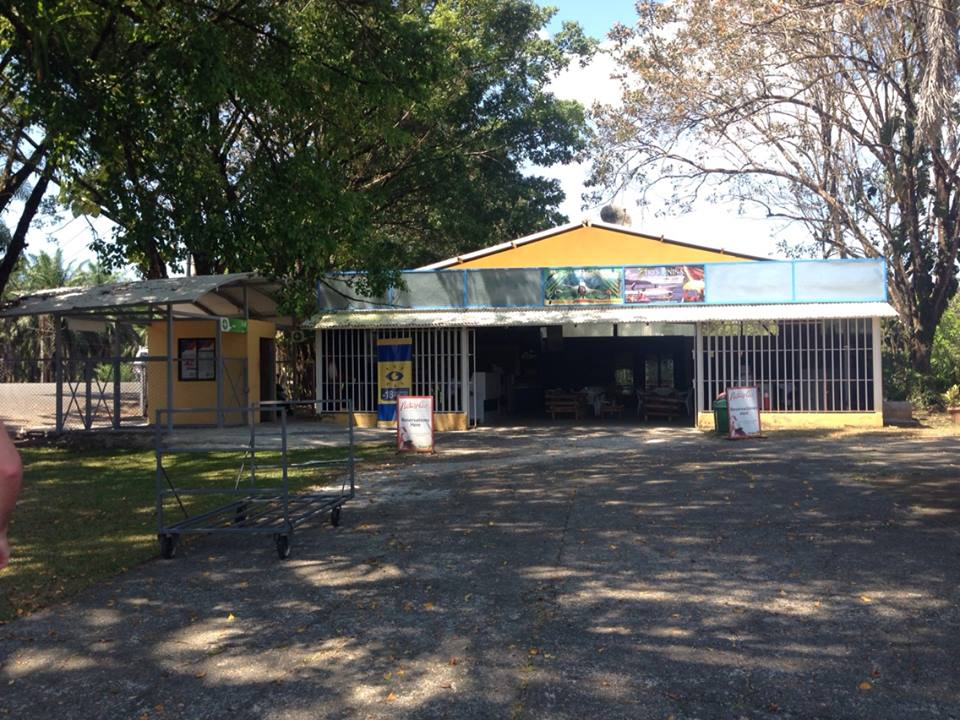
Quepos Airport terminal building, holding the Nature Air and Sansa ticket counters, along with restrooms, a snack stand/bar, and a Costa Rican departure tax stand.

== Airlines and destinations ==
Airlines	Destinations
Aerobell Airlines	San José–Tobías Bolaños
Costa Rica Green Airways	San José–Juan Santamaría
Sansa Airlines	San José–Juan Santamaría

== Passenger statistics ==
La Managua Airport is the fourth-busiest in the country by passenger traffic and the second-busiest domestic-only airport after Puerto Jiménez Airport. These data show number of passengers movements into the airport, according to the Directorate General of Civil Aviation of Costa Rica's Statistical Yearbooks.

Year	2010	2011	2012	2013	2014	2015	2016	2017
Passengers	36,292	30,588	27,550	22,892	32,717	29,872	33,999	35,752
Growth (%)	▼16.05%	▼15.72%	▼9.93%	▼16.91%	▲42.92%	▼8.70%	▲13.82%	▲5.16%
Source: Costa Rica's Directorate General of Civil Aviation (DGAC). Statistical Yearbooks (Years 2010, 2011, 2012, 2013, 2014, 2015, 2016, and 2017)

Year	2000	2001	2002	2003	2004	2005	2006	2007	2008	2009
Passengers	27,562	28,554	25,608	24,829	38,240	39,773	49,349	56,020	51,992	43,228
Growth (%)	N.A.	▲3.60%	▼10.32%	▼3.04%	▲54.01%	▲4.01%	▲24.08%	▲13.52%	▼7.19%	▼16.86%
Source: Costa Rica's Directorate General of Civil Aviation (DGAC). Statistical Yearbooks (Years 2000-2005, 2006, 2007, 2008, and 2009 )

== See also ==
- Transport in Costa Rica
- List of airports in Costa Rica
