= Juan Santamaría International Airport =

Airport serving San José, Costa Rica; located in Alajuela

Juan Santamaría International Airport Aeropuerto Internacional Juan Santamaría
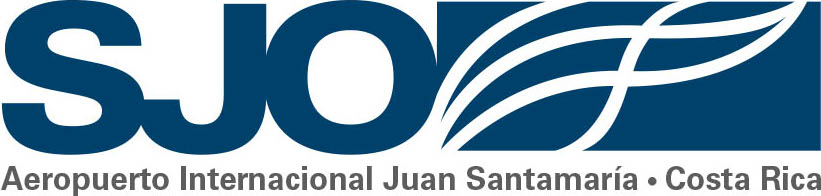

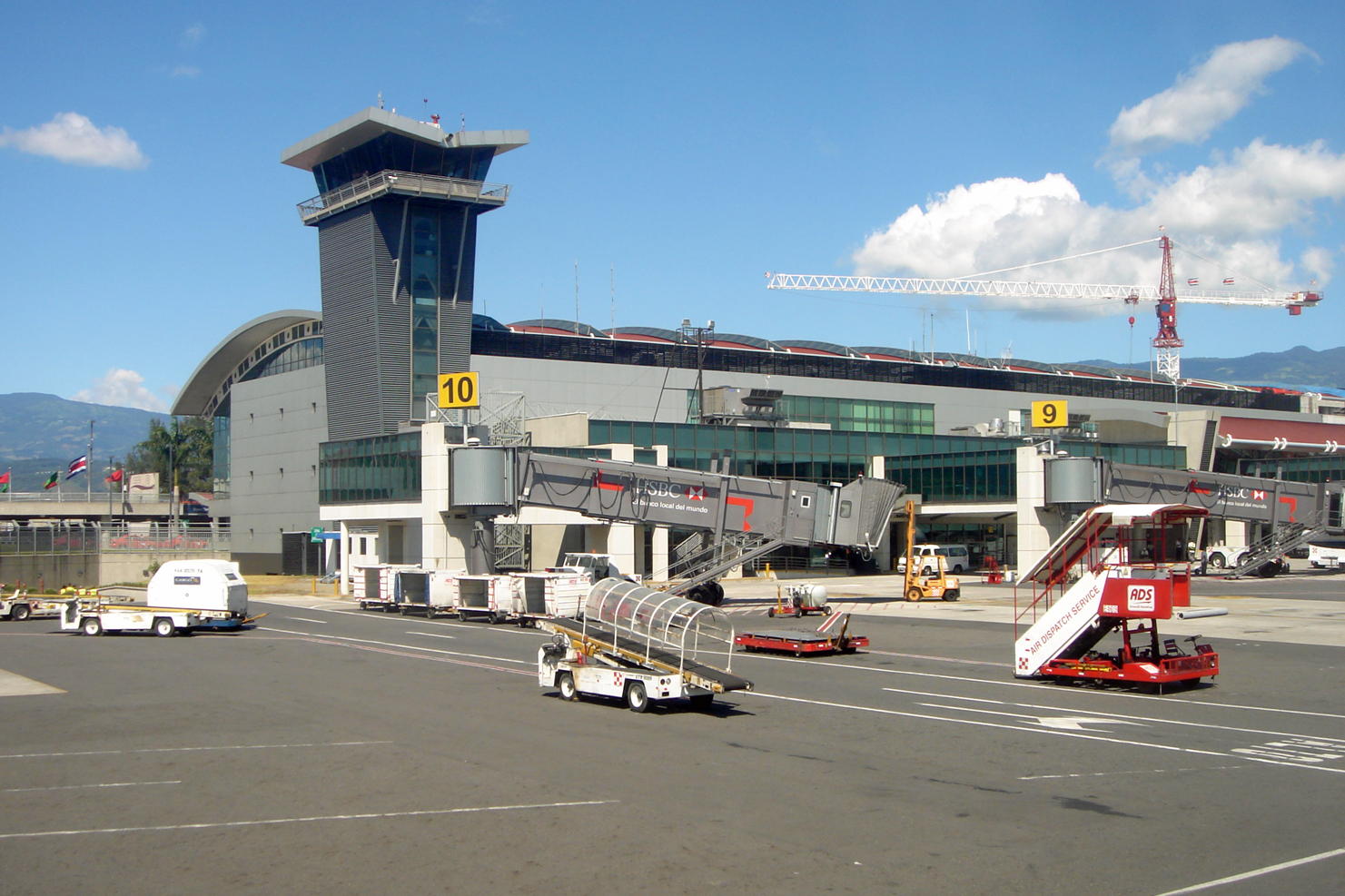
- IATA: SJO; ICAO: MROC

Summary
- Airport type: Public
- Owner: Government of Costa Rica
- Operator: Aeris Holdings Costa Rica under CCR S.A.
- Serves: San José, Costa Rica
- Location: Alajuela Province, Costa Rica
- Opened: May 2, 1958; 68 years ago
- Hub for: Avianca Costa Rica; Costa Rica Green Airways; Sansa Airlines
- Focus city for: Avianca El Salvador; Copa Airlines
- Operating base for: Volaris Costa Rica
- Elevation AMSL: 921 m (3,022 ft)
- Coordinates: 9°59′38″N 84°12′32″W
- Website: www.sjoairport.com

Map
- Location in Costa Rica

Runways
Direction	Length		Surface
Direction	m	ft	Surface
07/25	3,012	9,882	Asphalt

Statistics (2025)
- Total Passengers: 6,707,096
- Aircraft movements: 107,822
- Source: Costa Rican AIP, DGAC

Juan Santamaría International Airport (IATA: SJO, ICAO: MROC) is the primary international airport serving San José, the capital of Costa Rica. The airport is located in Alajuela Province, 20 kilometres (12 mi; 11 nmi) northwest of downtown San José. It is named after Costa Rica's national hero, Juan Santamaría, a drummer boy who died in 1856 defending his country against forces led by William Walker, an American filibuster. It is the biggest and busiest airport in Costa Rica and second in Central America, transiting more than 5 million passengers per year before COVID.

The airport is a hub for Avianca Costa Rica, Costa Rica Green Airways, Sansa Airlines, and Volaris Costa Rica, and a focus city for Avianca El Salvador and Copa Airlines. It was the country's only international gateway for many years, before the opening of the international airport in Liberia, Guanacaste. Both airports have direct flights to North and Central America and Europe, but Juan Santamaría International Airport also serves cities in South America and the Caribbean.

== History ==
The airport was built to replace the previous one in downtown San Jose, where Parque La Sabana is located today. The government secured funding in 1951 and construction proceeded slowly until the airport was officially inaugurated on 2 May 1958. It was initially called "Aeropuerto Internacional el Coco", after its location of the same name in the province of Alajuela. It was later renamed in honor of Juan Santamaría. In 1961, funding was secured to build the highway connecting the airport to downtown San José. In 1981, a five-year development plan was drawn for the airport. Subsequently, a new runway was built, and navigation aids including approach lights, a VHF omnidirectional range (VOR), an instrument landing system (ILS), distance measuring equipment (DME), and a radar were installed.

Juan Santamaría International Airport was once the busiest airport in Central America, but is currently second after Tocumen International Airport in Panama.

== Facilities ==
The airport's sole runway allows operations of wide-body aircraft. Currently, some scheduled flights are operated with Airbus A330, A340, and A350, and Boeing 747, 767, 777, and 787, for both passengers and freight. A Concorde landed in 1999 for that year's airshow. Previously, the airport had a small hangar, called the "NASA" hangar, to house research aircraft like the Martin B-57 Canberra high-altitude aircraft, that were being operated in Costa Rica. After that mission was completed, the hangar was removed. Internationally, the largest operator in the airport is Avianca and all their branches, followed by Copa Airlines, which uses the Main Terminal (M). Domestically, the largest airline is Sansa Airlines, and their flights depart from the Domestic Terminal (D). The largest U.S. airlines at the airport by number of destinations served all year long is United Airlines, and the largest European airline at the airport is Iberia, which is the only European airline that flies daily all year long between Europe and San José, and which operates from Madrid airport using Airbus A330-200 and an Airbus A350-900XWB (especially in European winter season).

No major changes were made to the terminal until November 1997, when the government issued a decree requesting participation of private companies to manage the operations of the airport. After several years of legal challenges and contract negotiations, in May 2001, Alterra Partners received a 20-year concession and started managing the facilities. It was also expected that the company would finish the necessary expansion and construction of new facilities; in March 2002, however, Alterra announced it would cease any further construction due to disagreements over financing and airport use fee billing with the government. The dispute lasted several years and problems started at the terminal; in 2005, the International Civil Aviation Organization pointed out that the airport did not comply with safety regulations. In July 2009, Alterra yielded the contract to a consortium composed of Houston-based Canadian-American company ADC & HAS and the Brazilian company, Andrade Gutierrez Concessoes (AGC)—a subsidiary of the conglomerate Andrade Gutierrez. In December 2009, Alterra Partners changed its name to AERIS Holdings, S.A. In November 2010, Aeris announced it had finished the expansion and construction of new facilities with the installation of the 9th boarding bridge.

The airport houses three business lounges for both special card holders and business class travellers: Avianca Club, Copa Club, and VIP Lounge (for BAC Credomatic customers).

== Airlines and destinations ==
The following airlines have scheduled direct services to and/or from Juan Santamaría International Airport:

=== Passenger ===
Airlines	Destinations
Aeroméxico	Mexico City–Benito Juárez
Air Canada	Montréal–Trudeau, Toronto–Pearson
Air France	Paris–Charles de Gaulle
Air Transat	Montréal–Trudeau; Seasonal: Québec City (begins 15 December 2026), Toronto–Pearson
Alaska Airlines	Los Angeles
American Airlines	Charlotte, Dallas/Fort Worth, Miami; Seasonal: Chicago–O'Hare
Arajet	Santo Domingo–Las Américas
Avianca	Bogotá
Avianca Costa Rica	Bogotá, Buenos Aires-Ezeiza, Cartagena, Guatemala City, Guayaquil, Medellín–JMC, Mexico City–Benito Juárez, Miami, New York–JFK, Panama City–Tocumen, Quito, San Salvador, Washington–Dulles; Seasonal: Chicago–O'Hare, San Pedro Sula
Avianca El Salvador	San Salvador
Breeze Airways	Tampa
British Airways	Seasonal: London–Heathrow (begins 25 October 2026)
Copa Airlines	Guatemala City, Managua, Panama City–Tocumen
Costa Rica Green Airways	Quepos, Tambor
Delta Air Lines	Atlanta, Seasonal: Los Angeles
Discover Airlines	Frankfurt (begins 14 December 2027)
Edelweiss Air	Zurich
Frontier Airlines	Seasonal: Atlanta, Orlando
Iberia	Madrid
Iberojet	Madrid
JetBlue	Fort Lauderdale, New York–JFK
KLM	Amsterdam
LATAM Perú	Lima
Lufthansa	Frankfurt (ends 14 December 2027)
Porter Airlines	Seasonal: Toronto–Pearson (begins 2 December 2026)
Sansa Airlines	Bocas del Toro, Drake Bay, Golfito, La Fortuna/San Carlos, Liberia (CR), Managua, Limón, Nosara Beach, Puerto Jiménez, Quepos, Tamarindo, Tambor, Tortuguero
Southwest Airlines	Austin (begins 13 March 2027), Houston–Hobby, Orlando; Seasonal: Baltimore, Denver, Nashville
United Airlines	Houston–Intercontinental, Newark, San Francisco; Seasonal: Chicago–O'Hare, Denver, Los Angeles, Washington–Dulles
Viva	Monterrey
Volaris	Cancún
Volaris Costa Rica	Cancún, Guadalajara, Mexico City–Benito Juárez, Orlando
Wingo	Medellín–JMC

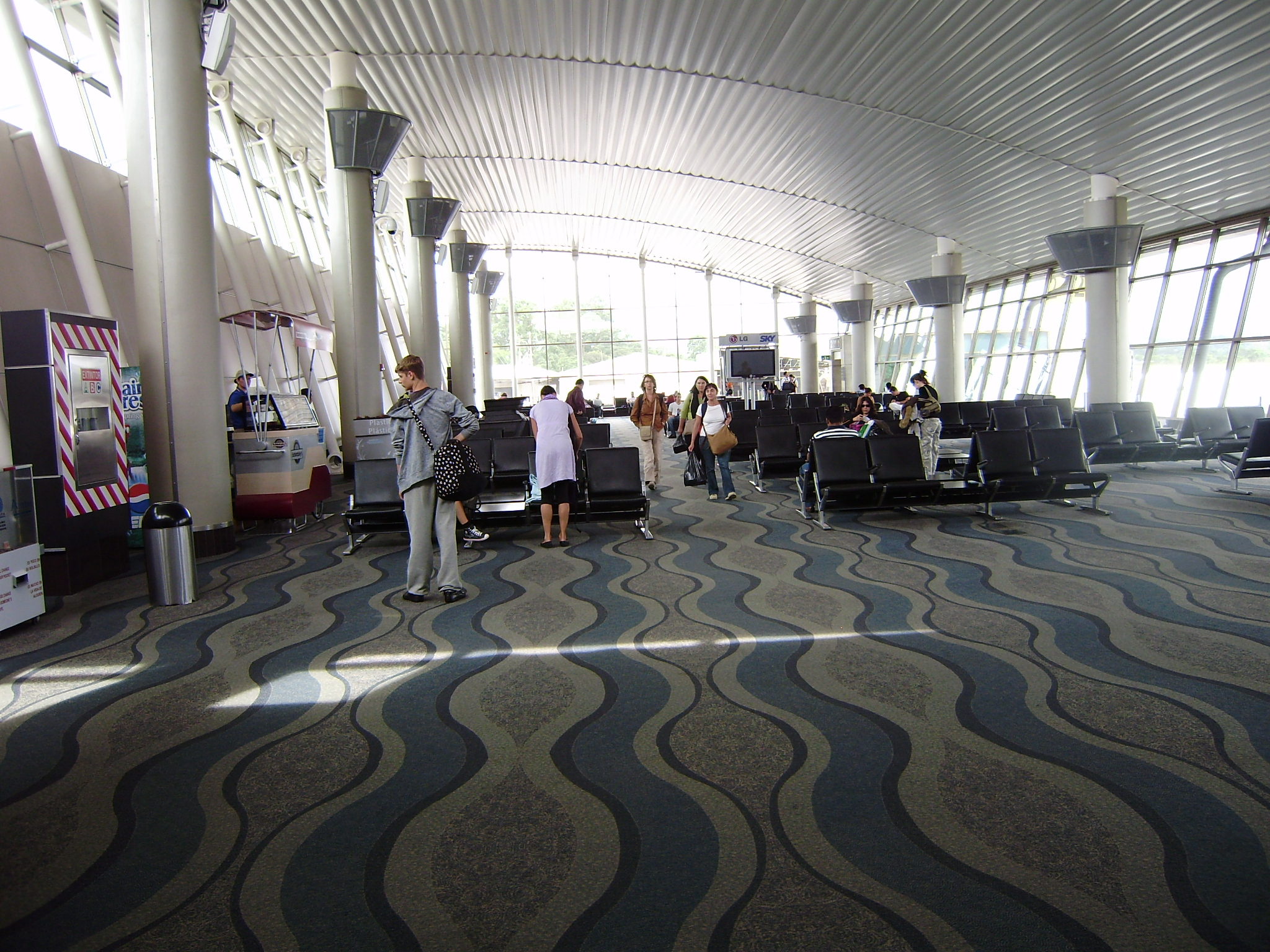
Departures hall

Terminal facade

== Statistics ==
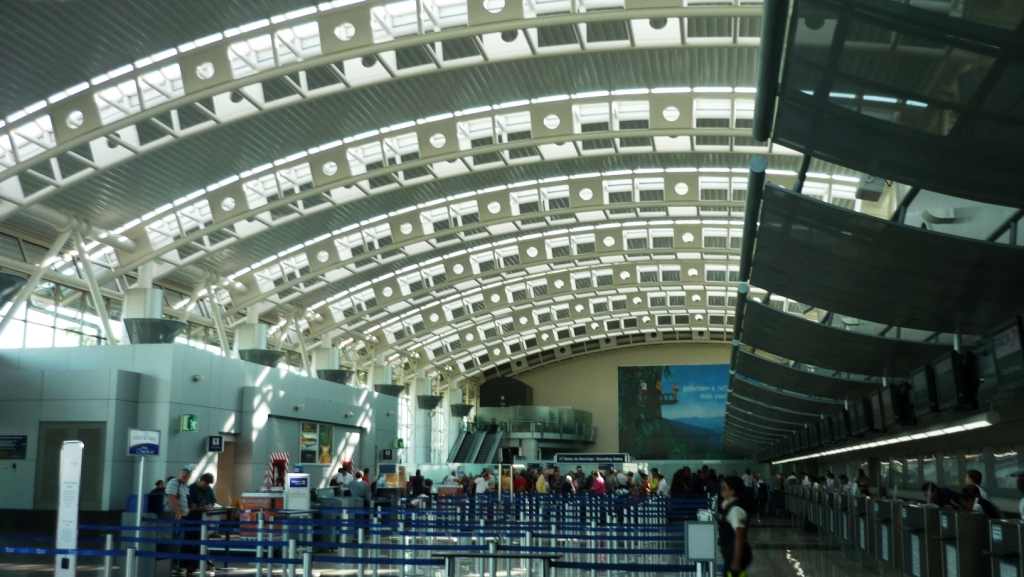
Interior of the check-in hall

Juan Santamaria International Airport is the largest and busiest airport in Costa Rica, having experienced a constant increase in traffic since its opening in 1958, boosted by the growing flow of tourists. The airport reached more than one million passengers per year for the first time in 1991 and having a record number of passengers in 2024. Traffic movements and freight (in metric tons) also reached a peak in 2023.

	Number of passengers	Percentage change	Number of movements	Freight (tonnes)
2020	1,716,792	▼69.0%	35,808	76,280
2021	2,963,551	▲72.6%	62,014	92,420
2022	4,936,391	▲66.6%	87,004	100,909
2023	6,222,889	▲26.1%	95,896	102,478
2024	6,500,549	▲4.5%	91,524	100,770
2025	6,707,096	▲3.2%	107,822	108,906

== Ground transportation ==
The road access to the airport is on an exit at Route 1 and near the exit to Alajuela. There is a parking area with surcharge and a bus stop with plenty of services to San Jose downtown (with no exact schedule but with 24-hour bus service and approximately one service every 10 minutes during working hours). Licensed taxis are available in the airport and will generally accept both colónes and U.S. dollars, but not other currencies. Costa Rican taxis are red with yellow triangles on the doors, ubiquitous all over the country, and there is a special airport taxi service that is licensed and employs orange taxis. Although the rail line linking downtown Alajuela with San José's Atlantic Station passes in close proximity to the airport, it does not serve the airport, and there is no rail service of any kind to the airport.

== Accidents and incidents ==
- On 20 August 1977, a Monarch Aviation Convair CV-880 struck trees and crashed 2.5 km (1.6 mi) southeast of SJO shortly after takeoff probably because the aircraft was overweight with cargo. All 3 occupants died.
- On 23 May 1988, LACSA Flight 628, a leased Boeing 727-100 (TI-LRC) operating the route San Jose-Managua-Miami, collided with a fence at the end of the runway in the Juan Santamaria International Airport, crashed at a nearby field next to a highway, and caught fire. The excess of weight in the front part of the airplane was the cause of the accident. There were no fatalities out of the 23 occupants.
- On 16 January 1990, SANSA Flight 32 crashed into the Cerro Cedral, a mountain, shortly after takeoff from Juan Santamaria International Airport. All 20 passengers and 3 crew on board died in the crash.
- On 3 September 2007, a North American Rockwell Sabreliner 70 registration N726JR aborted the takeoff from runway 07. The airplane ran off the right side of the runway into the grass. The landing gear collapsed as the plane skidded and turned 180 degrees. The aircraft was written off.
- On 7 April 2022, DHL Aero Expreso Flight 7216, a Boeing 757-27A operated by DHL Aviation en route to Guatemala City skidded off the runway while performing an emergency landing due to a hydraulic problem. The aircraft was written off because the tail section broke off; however, there was no fire or injuries reported.

== See also ==
- Transport in Costa Rica
- List of airports in Costa Rica
