= Bahía Drake =

Small bay on the north side of the Osa Peninsula in Costa Rica

Coordinates: 8°42′N 83°40′W

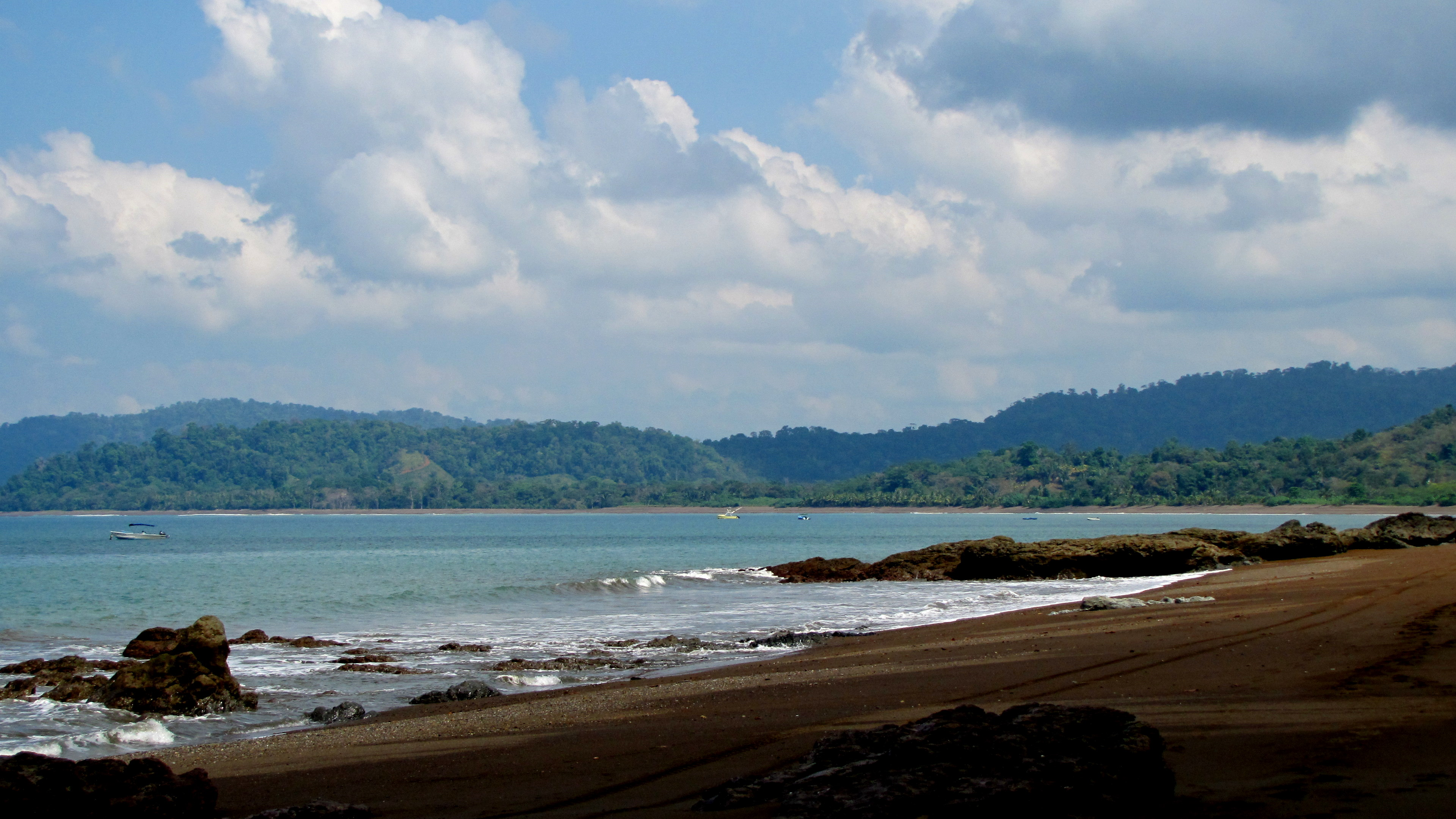
Bahía Drake

Bahía Drake (Drake Bay; Spanish pronunciation: [ˈdɾake]) is a small bay on the north side of the Osa Peninsula on the coast of southwestern Costa Rica.

This bay is believed to be a port used by Sir Francis Drake during his raids on the Spanish Main in the 16th century, and the location of one of the British pirate's fabled hidden treasures.

The main town of Bahía Drake is Agujitas, with a population of about 1,000 residents. The bay can be reached by plane, boat, or car (ideally, a 4x4 vehicle) during the dry season. Because of lack of bridges, driving to Bahía Drake is challenging and not recommended for visitors. There are many kilometers of unpaved road and multiple river crossings required to reach Drake Bay. There are kilometers of natural coastline with rocky crags and sandy coves that extend from Agujitas, where the village of Bahía Drake is located southward toward the boundary of Corcovado National Park about 20 kilometers to the south. Most of the eco lodges are located along the beach. The town of Bahía Drake has a public medical clinic opened during weekdays, except for national holidays; a private medical center opened 24/7 for emergencies; a school; a few grocery stores; a gift shop; and several restaurants and bars.

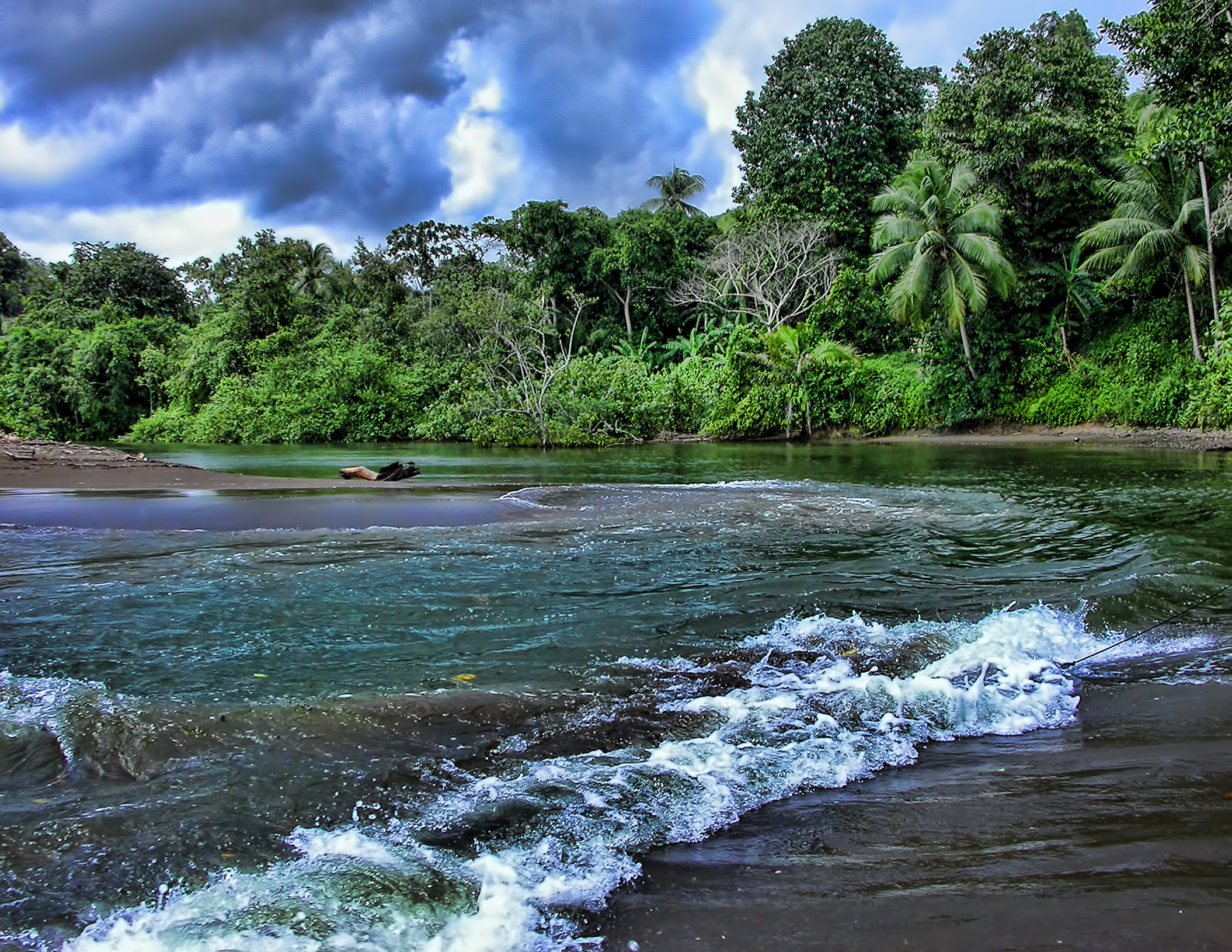
Río Aguajitas, Costa Rica

The chief recreational activities at Bahia Drake are hiking in Corcovado National Park and snorkeling and diving at Caño Island. Corcovado National Park occupies about a third of the peninsula. The preservation of forest and wildlife in the area has been made a priority by the Costa Rican government through the efforts of MINAE.

Bahía Drake has been accessible only by sea until recently and so it remains mainly a low-land tropical rainforest. Since about 1990, eco-tourism has been the principal economy of the area including sport fishing

== Climate ==
Bahía Drake has a tropical rainforest climate (Af) with significant seasonal variation. February, the driest month receives about 65 mm of rain while October, the wettest month receives about 803 mm. The following climate data is for the town of Agujitas.

Climate data for Agujitas de Drake
Month	Jan	Feb	Mar	Apr	May	Jun	Jul	Aug	Sep	Oct	Nov	Dec	Year
Mean daily maximum °C (°F)	31.9 (89.4)	32.6 (90.7)	33.8 (92.8)	33.6 (92.5)	32.3 (90.1)	31.4 (88.5)	31.6 (88.9)	31.3 (88.3)	30.7 (87.3)	30.3 (86.5)	30.1 (86.2)	30.8 (87.4)	31.7 (89.1)
Daily mean °C (°F)	25.7 (78.3)	26.0 (78.8)	27.4 (81.3)	27.7 (81.9)	27.1 (80.8)	26.4 (79.5)	26.6 (79.9)	26.2 (79.2)	25.7 (78.3)	25.5 (77.9)	25.2 (77.4)	25.2 (77.4)	26.2 (79.2)
Mean daily minimum °C (°F)	19.6 (67.3)	19.5 (67.1)	21.0 (69.8)	21.9 (71.4)	22.0 (71.6)	21.4 (70.5)	21.6 (70.9)	21.1 (70.0)	20.8 (69.4)	20.8 (69.4)	20.4 (68.7)	19.7 (67.5)	20.8 (69.5)
Average precipitation mm (inches)	93 (3.7)	65 (2.6)	139 (5.5)	222 (8.7)	437 (17.2)	473 (18.6)	484 (19.1)	586 (23.1)	692 (27.2)	803 (31.6)	595 (23.4)	223 (8.8)	4,812 (189.5)
Source: Climate-Data.org
