= Directorate General of Civil Aviation (Costa Rica) =

Civil aviation authority of Costa Rica

- Dirección General de Aviación Civil

Agency overview
- Formed: 26 October 1949
- Jurisdiction: Government of Costa Rica
- Headquarters: San José, Costa Rica; 9°56′0″N 84°5′0″W
- Agency executives: Fernando Naranjo Elizondo, Director-General; Luis Miranda Muñoz, Deputy Director-General
- Website: www.dgac.go.cr

The Directorate General of Civil Aviation (Spanish: Dirección General de Aviación Civil, DGAC), is the civil aviation authority of Costa Rica. It oversees all aspects of civil aviation operations and infrastructure within the country. The body was created by law on 26 October 1949. Its headquarters are in San José.

As of April 2024, the Director-General was Fernando Naranjo Elizondo, seconded by the Deputy Director-General, Luis Miranda Muñoz.

The agency investigates any aviation accidents and incidents that occur in Costa Rica.

== See also ==
- International Civil Aviation Organization
- List of airports in Costa Rica
- List of civil aviation authorities
