= List of airlines of Costa Rica =

This is a list of airlines currently operating in Costa Rica.

== Active ==
Airline	Image	IATA	ICAO	Callsign	Founded	Notes
Aerobell Airlines			GAB	CALI	1988	
Avianca Costa Rica		LR	LRC	LACSA	2013	Flag carrier.
Aviones Taxi Aereo					1971	
Costa Rica Green Airways		GW	GRC	GREENAIR	2018	
SANSA		RZ	LRS	SANSA	1978	
Skyway Costa Rica		LC	GCS	SKY TEC	2017	
TAC Airlines			TIC	TAC AIRLINES	2018	
Volaris Costa Rica		Q6	VOC	COSTA RICAN	2016	

== Defunct ==
Airline	Image	IATA	ICAO	Callsign	Founded	Ceased operations	Notes
ACASA					1968	1976	Merged with AVE Airlines.
ACS - Air Cargo Service					1997	2000	
Aero Costa Rica		ML	AEK	ACORISA	1991	1997	
Aero Costa Sol			CSG	COSTA SOL	1999	2006	Failed project.
Aeropostal Alas de Centroamerica					2003	2007	
AVE Airlines					1951	1979	
Air Costa Rica		RI	RII	TICA	2014	2018	Founded as a subsidiary of Air Panama.
ANSA - Aerolineas Nacionales					1958	1960	
APSA					1971	1979	
Carga Expresa					1983	1983	
Costa Rica Skies			CSR		2006	2008	
JHM Cargo Airlines			JHM		1996	2001	Operated cargo flights on-behalf of TACA Airlines.
LACSA		LR	LRC	LACSA	1945	2004	Rebranded as TACA Costa Rica.
LADECA					1966	1967	
Nature Air		5C	NRR	NATUREAIR	1989	2018	
Paradise Air		DJ			2000	2013	
RANSA - Ruta Aérea Nacional SA					1979	1980	Taken over by SANSA.
SAISA					1996	1997	
SARPA Costa Rica					2009	2011	
TACA Costa Rica		LR	LRC	LACSA	2004	2013	Rebranded as Avianca Costa Rica.
TACA de Costa Rica					1939	1952	
TAISA		TC			1971	1978	
Ticos Air					2012	2014	Never launched.
TransCarga			TDA	TRANSCARGA	1988	1992	
Trans Costa Rica			TCR	TICOS	1979	2000	
VEL - Vuelos Especiales Liberianos					1983	1986	
West Caribbean Costa Rica		0W	WCR	WEST CARIBBEAN	2002	2005	
Wiggins International			ALA		1979	1979	

== See also ==
- List of airlines of the Americas
- List of airports in Costa Rica
