= List of companies of Costa Rica =

Location of Costa Rica

Costa Rica is a country in Central America, bordered by Nicaragua to the north, Panama to the southeast, the Pacific Ocean to the west, the Caribbean Sea to the east, and Ecuador to the south of Cocos Island. It has a population of around 4.5 million, of whom nearly a quarter live in the metropolitan area of the capital and largest city, San José.

Pharmaceuticals, financial outsourcing, software development, and ecotourism have become the prime industries in Costa Rica's economy. High levels of education among its residents make the country an attractive investing location. Since 1999, tourism earns more foreign exchange than the combined exports of the country's three main cash crops: bananas, pineapples and coffee. Coffee production has played a key role in Costa Rica's history and economy, and by 2006, was the third cash crop export.

== Notable firms ==
This list includes notable companies with primary headquarters located in the country. The industry and sector follow the Industry Classification Benchmark taxonomy. Organizations which have ceased operations are included and noted as defunct.

Notable companies Status: P=Private, S=State; A=Active, D=Defunct
Name	Industry	Sector	Headquarters	Founded	Notes	Status	
Abangares Mining Company	Basic materials	Gold mining	Abangares	1884	Gold mining, defunct	P	D
Aeropostal Alas de Centroamerica	Consumer services	Airlines	San José	2003	Airline, defunct	P	D
Avianca Costa Rica	Consumer services	Airlines	San José	1945	Part of Avianca (Colombia)	P	A
Café Britt	Consumer services	Restaurants & bars	Heredia	1985	Coffee	P	A
Cerveceria Costa Rica	Consumer goods	Brewers	Heredia	1908	Brewery	P	A
Dos Pinos	Consumer goods	Food products	Alajuela Province	1947	Dairy products	P	A
Florida Ice and Farm Company	Consumer goods	Brewers	Heredia	1908	Brewery, food processor	P	A
ICE	Utilities	Conventional electricity	San José	1949	Electrical monopoly	S	A
Nature Air	Consumer services	Airlines	San José	1990	Airline	P	A
Paradise Air	Consumer services	Airlines	San José	2000	Charter airline, defunct 2013	P	D
Realtime Gaming	Consumer services	Gambling	Heredia	1998	Gambling	P	A
Rostipollos	Consumer services	Restaurants & bars	San José	1983	Restaurant	P	A
Sansa Airlines	Consumer services	Airlines	San José	1978	Airline	P	A
Ticos Air	Consumer services	Airlines	Santa Ana	2012	Airline	P	A
Ujarrás	Consumer goods	Food products	San José	1962	Food	P	A
Wagerweb	Consumer services	Gambling	San José	1994	Gambling	P	A

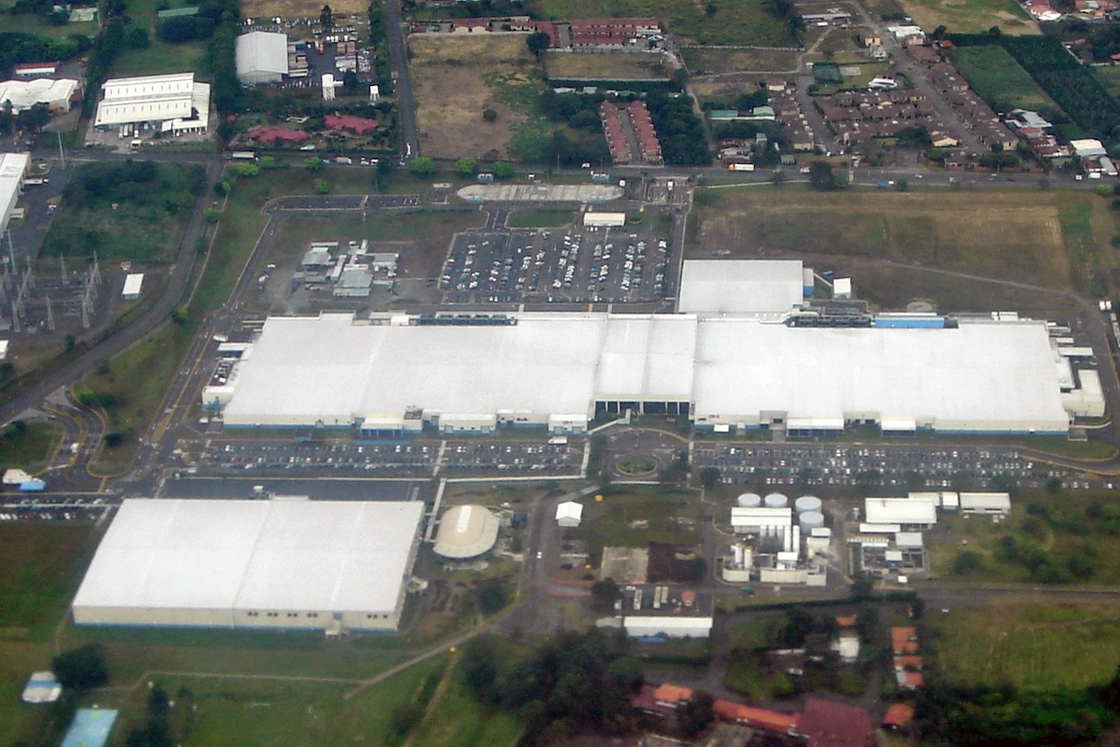
An Intel microprocessor facility in Costa Rica

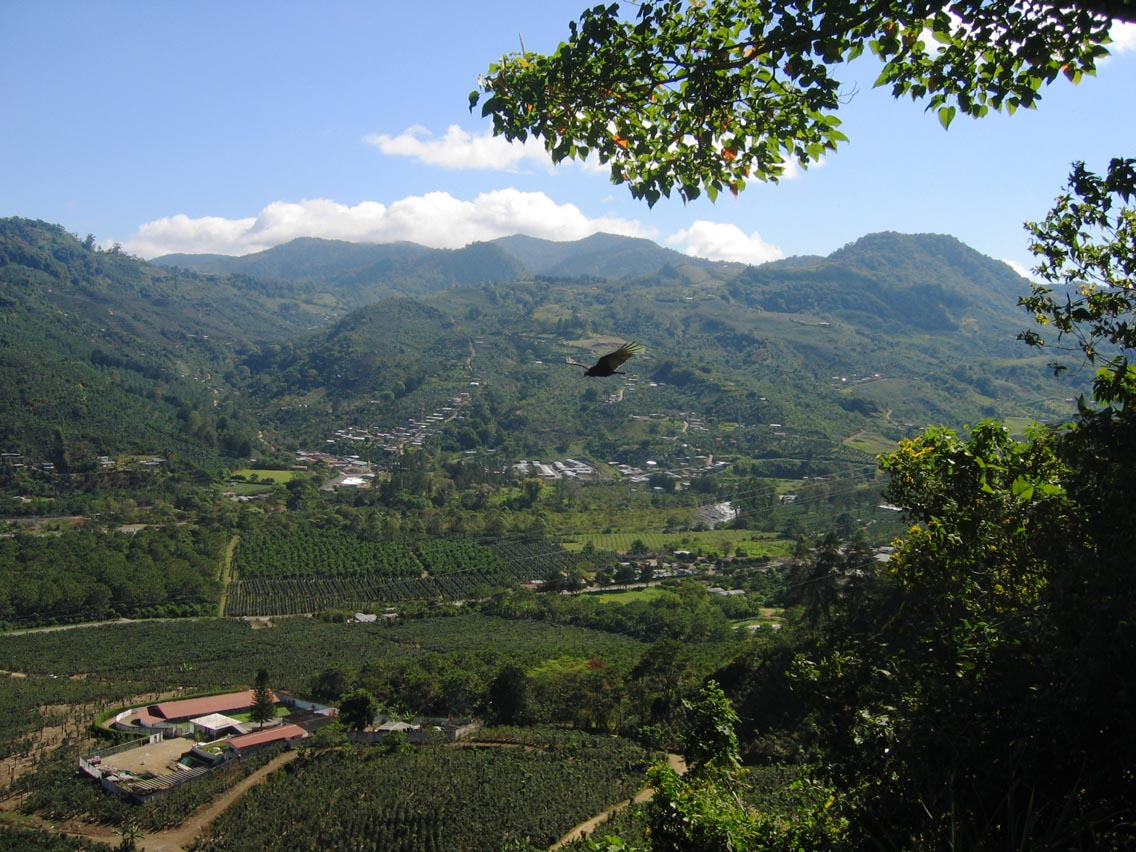
A coffee plantation in the Orosí Valley

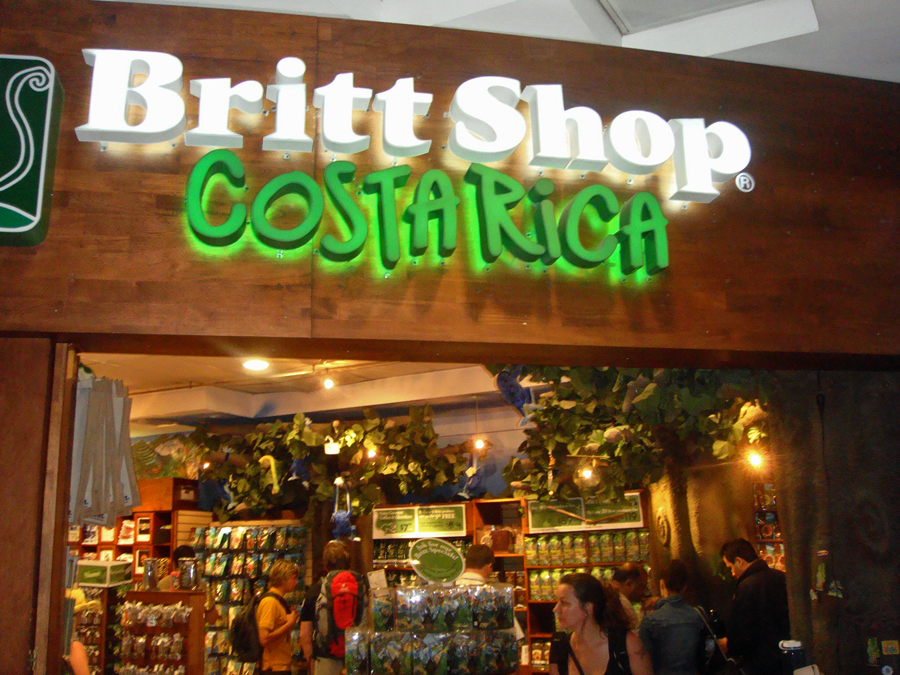
Café Britt storefront
