= Travelair =

Travelair may refer to:

- Beechcraft Travel Air, a twin-engined light aircraft of the 1950s/1960s
- Travel Air, a 1920s US aircraft manufacturer, taken over in 1929 by Curtiss-Wright
- Olympic Air § Travelair Club, the frequent flyer program of Olympic Air, a Greek airline
- Travel Air, a German airline
- Travel Air, a Costa Rican airline (1991-2000), later renamed Nature Air
