= Flight 144 =

Flight 144 may refer to:

Listed chronologically

- Serviços Aéreos Cruzeiro do Sul Flight 144, crashed on 3 May 1963
- Nature Air Flight 144, crashed on 31 December 2017
