= Public finances in Costa Rica =

Aspect of Costa Rican economy

The pattern of public expenditure and revenue in Costa Rica is typical of a middle income country. According to the CIA World Factbook, in 2023, central government revenue was US $26.333 billion, while expenditure was $25.953 billion.

== Revenue ==
The major sources of revenue are income taxes, indirect taxes, social security contributions and customs duties. According to figures prepared by the Costa Rican government for the International Monetary Fund, the basic breakdown as a percentage of GDP is as in the table below.

Item (% GDP)	2007	2008	2009
Tax revenue	15.2	15.6	13.9
Direct taxes	4.6	5.1	4.7
Sales tax	5.9	6.0	5.0
Excise, customs, and others	4.8	4.6	4.3
Nontax revenue	0.3	0.2	0.3
Contributions to social security	6.3	6.7	7.1
Operating balance of public enterprises	1.0	0.5	0.6
Total Revenues	22.8	23.1	21.9

There is no VAT in Costa Rica, but there is a generally applied sales tax of 13% that, combined with excise taxes on specific consumption goods raises around half of government revenue. Income tax rates rise with reported income, beginning at 10% for annual income over Costa Rican colón 41,112,000. As of 2010, the top rate of 30% applies to people earning in excess of Costa Rican colón 82,698,000. Nominally, employers are responsible for the bulk of social security contributions.

== Expenditure ==
The largest components of expenditure are education (21.3% of government expenditure in 2007/08), social protection (21.1%) and healthcare (19%). There is no expenditure on defence. In cash terms, expenditure has risen steeply: healthcare expenditure rose by a factor of 4.5 between 1999 and 2008, while social protection rose by a factor of 4 over the same period.

== Borrowing and debt ==
According to the IMF (the source for the table below), in most years recently Costa Rica has run fiscal deficits, but in 2007 and 2008 small surpluses were reported. Combined with some growth of the economy this has produced a decline in the debt-to-GDP ratio. The year 2009 saw a significant decline in the state of public finances and the IMF is forecasting deficits from 2010 to 2013.

Item (% GDP)	2007	2008	2009	2010 (est.)
Overall balance (% GDP)	1.2	0.1	-4.0	-4.5
Combined Public Sector Debt (%GDP)	43.2	35.7	37.9	37.9

Externally held public sector debt fell from 7.7% of GDP in 2007 to 5.5% in 2008.
