= Air Costa Rica =

Costa Rican airline

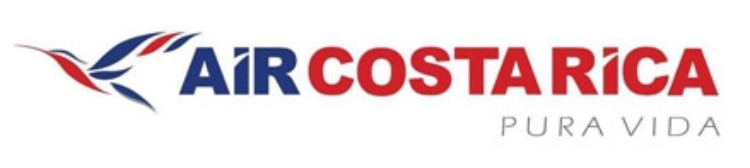
IATA	ICAO	Call sign
RI	RII	TICA
- Founded: 2014
- Commenced operations: February 10, 2017
- Ceased operations: 2018; 8 years ago (license suspended)
- Hubs: Juan Santamaría International Airport
- Fleet size: 1
- Parent company: Air Panama
- Headquarters: San José, Costa Rica
- Key people: Carlos Víquez (MD)
- Founders: George Novey; Eduardo Stagg

Air Costa Rica was a charter airline based in Juan Santamaría International Airport, San José, Costa Rica and a subsidiary of Air Panama.

== History ==
The airline was established in 2014 as Tica Air International with plans to launch in December of that year.

On August 5, 2015, the airline received its air operator's certificate from the Costa Rican aviation regulator, became eligible to start commercial operation, and announced that the carrier would commence later in December 2015.

The airline was suspended by the Costa Rica Civil Aviation Authority in 2018.

== Destinations (planned) ==
The airline had expressed its intention of initially flying to the following cities.

- (Colombia) Bogotá - El Dorado International Airport
- Guatemala City - La Aurora International Airport
- (Ecuador) Guayaquil - José Joaquín de Olmedo International Airport
- (Peru) Lima - Jorge Chavez International Airport
- (Nicaragua) Managua - Managua International Airport
- Panama City - Tocumen International Airport
- (Panama) Rio Hato - Scarlett Martínez International Airport
- (Honduras) Roatan - Juan Manuel Galvez International Airport

== Fleet ==
The Air Costa Rica fleet consisted of the following aircraft (as of August 2017):

Aircraft	In service	Orders	Passengers	Notes
Boeing 737-300QC	1	1	130	Operated by Air Panama
Fokker 100	—	2	100	
Total	1	3		

== See also ==
- List of defunct airlines of Costa Rica
