= Volaris Costa Rica =

Low-cost airline in Costa Rica

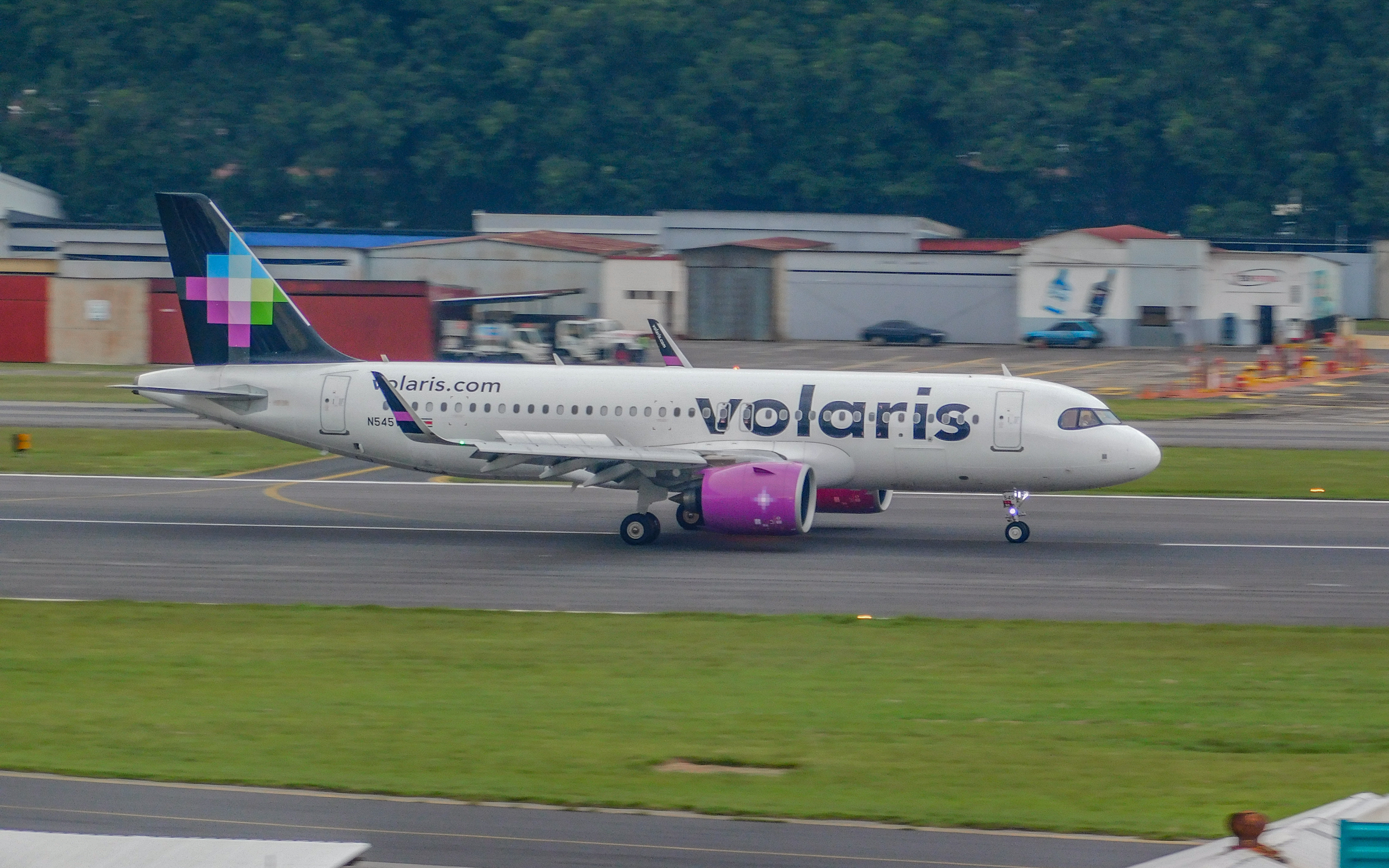
- Volaris Costa Rica Airbus A320neo
IATA	ICAO	Call sign
Q6	VOC	COSTA RICAN
- Founded: March 2016; 10 years ago
- Commenced operations: November 2016; 9 years ago
- Operating bases: San José (CR); San Salvador
- Frequent-flyer program: v.club
- Fleet size: 10
- Destinations: 12
- Parent company: Volaris
- Headquarters: San José, Costa Rica
- Key people: Fernando Naranjo (CEO)
- Website: www.volaris.com

Vuela Aviacion S.A., operating as Volaris Costa Rica, is a low-cost airline based at Juan Santamaría International Airport in San José, Costa Rica. It is a subsidiary of the Mexican Volaris. Announced in March 2016, the airline began operations in November with flights to Guatemala City.

== History ==
Parent company Volaris announced the creation of Volaris Costa Rica in March 2016, at which point the subsidiary was already nearing the end of certification with Costa Rican officials. Volaris confirmed in November 2016 that its Costa Rican subsidiary had obtained its air operator's certificate. Volaris Costa Rica operated its first flight from its San José base to Guatemala City on November 30, 2016, using an Airbus A320-200 wet leased from Volaris. The airline's initial area of focus is flights within Central America.

== Corporate affairs ==
Volaris Costa Rica is a subsidiary of Mexican airline Volaris and operates as a low-cost carrier. The airline's chief executive officer is Fernando Naranjo.

== Destinations ==
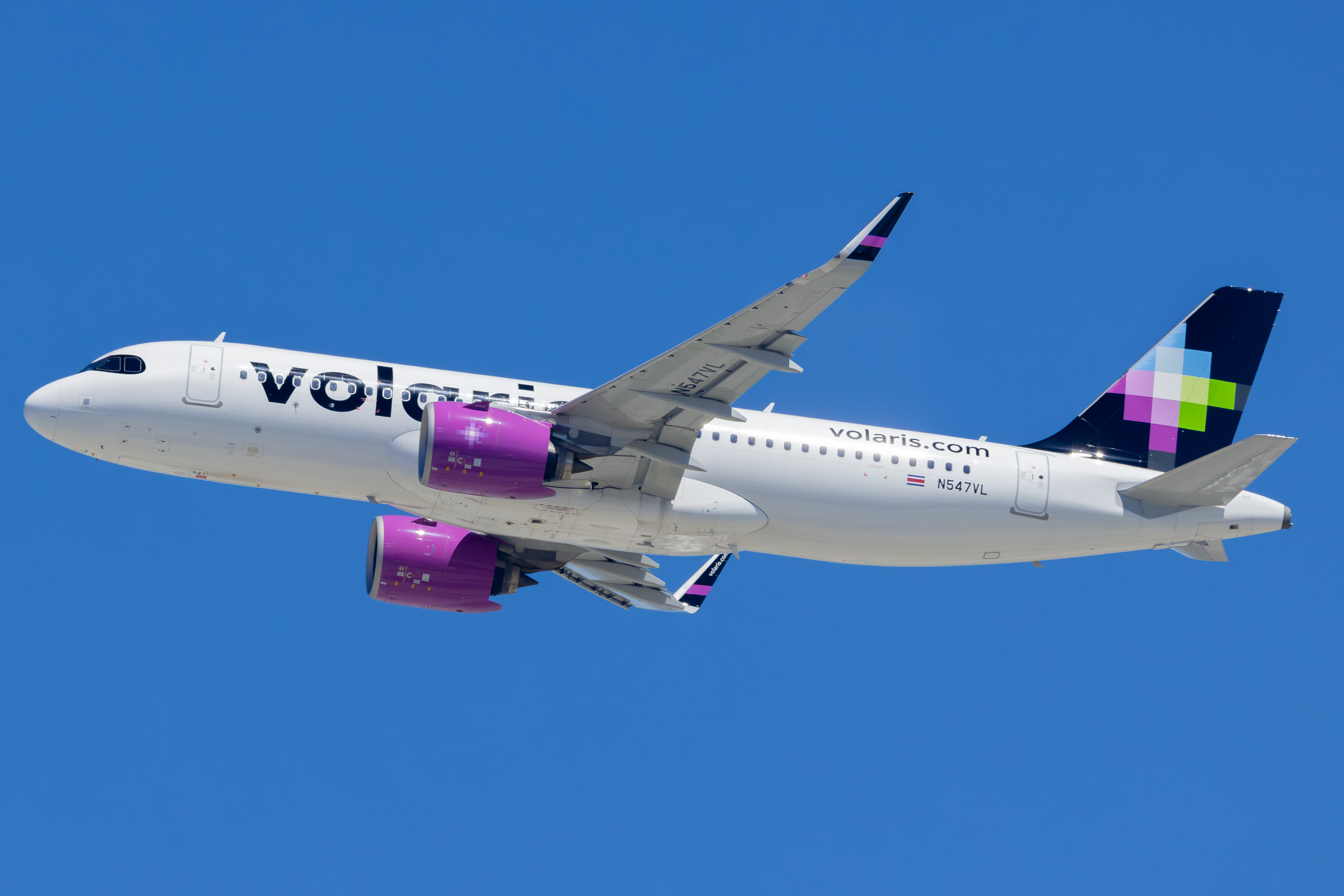
Volaris Costa Rica Airbus A320neo, 2023

As of September 2025, Volaris Costa Rica flies to the following destinations:

Country	City	Airport	Notes	Refs
Costa Rica	San José	Juan Santamaría International Airport	Base	
Colombia	Bogotá	El Dorado International Airport	Terminated	
El Salvador	San Salvador	El Salvador International Airport		
Guatemala	Guatemala City	La Aurora International Airport		
Honduras	Tegucigalpa	Comayagua International Airport		
Mexico	Cancún	Cancún International Airport		
Mexico	Guadalajara	Guadalajara International Airport		
Mexico	Mexico City	Mexico City International Airport		
Mexico	Tijuana	Tijuana International Airport	Terminated	
Mexico	Tulum	Tulum International Airport		
Nicaragua	Managua	Augusto C. Sandino International Airport	Terminated	
Peru	Lima	Jorge Chávez International Airport	Terminated	
United States	Los Angeles	Los Angeles International Airport		
United States	Miami	Miami International Airport		
United States	New York City	John F. Kennedy International Airport	Terminated	
United States	Orlando	Orlando International Airport		
United States	Washington, D.C.	Dulles International Airport		

== Fleet ==
=== Current fleet ===
As of July 2026, Volaris Costa Rica operates the following aircraft:

Volaris Costa Rica fleet
Aircraft	In service	Orders	Passengers	Notes
Airbus A320	8	—		
Airbus A320neo	2	—	186	
Total	10	—		

=== Former fleet ===
As of September 2025, Volaris Costa Rica operated 3 Airbus A320neo

Volaris Costa Rica also previously operated the following aircraft:

Volaris Costa Rica former fleet
Aircraft	Total	Introduced	Retired	Notes
Airbus A319-100	3	2018	2025	N501VL, N503VL, and N504VL.
Airbus A320-200	3	2016	2017	Wet-leased from Volaris.

== See also ==
- List of airlines of Costa Rica
- List of low-cost airlines
