= Aero Costa Rica =

Airline of Costa Rica

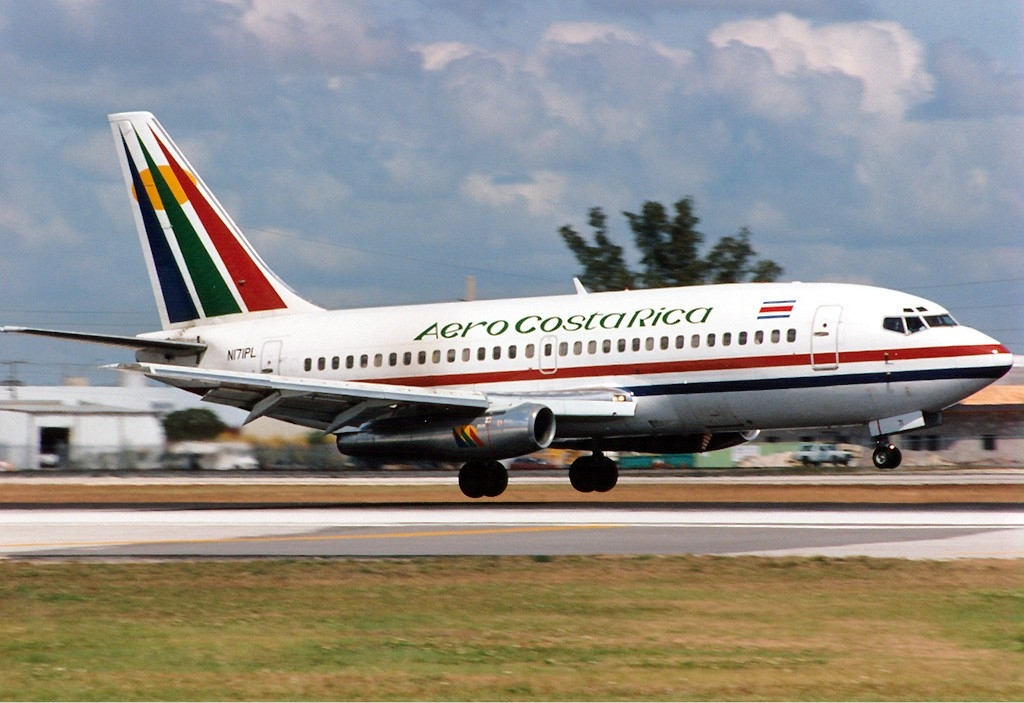
- A Boeing 737-200 landing at Miami International Airport in 1995
IATA	ICAO	Call sign
ML	AEK	ACORISA
- Commenced operations: May 11, 1992
- Ceased operations: September 30, 1997
- Hubs: Juan Santamaría International Airport
- Focus cities: Atlanta; Miami; Orlando; San Andrés; Charter services to Liberia
- Fleet size: 2
- Destinations: 4
- Headquarters: San José, Costa Rica
- Key people: Zadi Desme (CEO)

Aero Costa Rica ACORI, S.A. was an airline based in San José, Costa Rica with US offices in Miami Springs, Florida.

== History ==
The airline started service on 11 May 1992 with two Boeing 727-200 Ex-Pan Am (N353PA and N354PA) from San José to Miami. This was the only international carrier that broke the airline monopoly in Costa Rica held by LACSA since 1945. In July 1992, Aero Costa Rica's flight ML-211 made an emergency landing at Owen Roberts International Airport, Grand Cayman when the flight engineer forgot to open an auxiliary fuel valve after taking off from Miami. Later that year, the route San José-San Pedro Sula-Orlando was inaugurated but the company decided to drop it four months later. In 1993, the livery and the fleet were changed from two Boeing 727-200 to two Boeing 737-200 (N170PL and N171PL), with this equipment routes from San José to Atlanta and the San Andrés islands in the Caribbean were added. A 737-200 was sub-leased to Halisa Airlines of Haiti and later to Honduran carrier Isleña Airlines. The airline executives tried forging alliances with Cayman Airways, Aeroméxico, and Iberia.

Due to serious financial difficulties and ill-fated administrations, both 737s were returned to the lessor at the end of 1994. In 1995, under the administration of Peruvian entrepreneur Zadi Desme, the airline purchased a Boeing 727-100 (ex-American N1974) named "Por Fin" (At Last). Desme brought back the original livery introduced in 1992. After the demise of the airline, this airliner was parked at Miami International Airport for several years until it was scrapped. The company wet-leased aircraft and crews from Falcon Air Express from October 1996 until July 1997. Between July and September 1997, the company wet-leased two 727s (N12304 /N203AV) including crews from Nations Air. Nations Air flew routes between San Jose, Miami, and Orlando during that time frame, after which it finally collapsed. Owner Calixto Chaves Zamora intended to sell the airline to a Pakistani company based in Miami and represented by a Cuban-American named Osiris Rosario. The check Chaves received had no funds and the company could not remain in business any longer.

== Fleet ==
The airline operated the following aircraft:

Aircraft	Amount
Boeing 727-100	1
Boeing 727-200	3
Boeing 737-200	3

== See also ==
- List of defunct airlines of Costa Rica
