= Punta Islita =

Resort town in Costa Rica

Coordinates: 9.859°N 85.397°W

Punta Islita is a resort town in the Nandayure Canton, Guanacaste Province of Costa Rica. The Punta Islita Airport is located in the nearby town of Corozalito.

The village has houses and murals with Naive paintings and mosaics. The town is framed by cliffs, creating a halfmoon bay. It is named after the small area of land that becomes an island at high tide.

In December 2017, ten American tourists and two pilots were killed in a plane crash in Punta Islita.
