= Economy of Costa Rica =

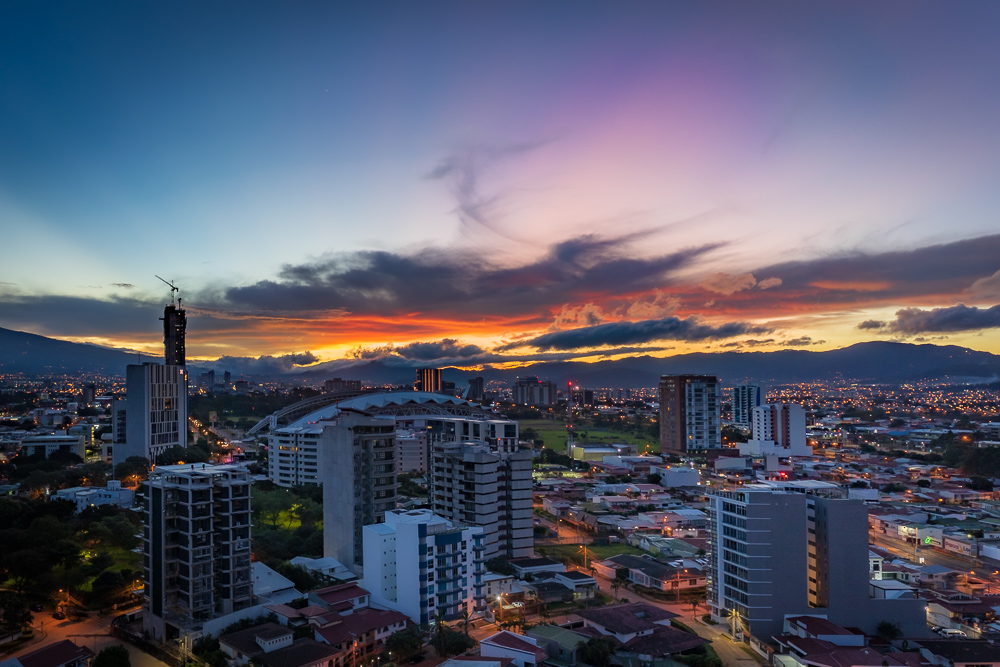
- San José
- Currency: Costa Rican colón (CRC, ₡)
- Fiscal year: calendar year
- Trade organizations: WTO, OECD, CAFTA-DR
- Country group: Developing/Emerging; High-income economy

Statistics
- Population: ▲5,213,362 (2022 estimate)
- GDP: ▲$115.25 Billion (nominal; 2026); ▲$185.29 Billion (PPP; 2026)
- GDP rank: 76th (nominal; 2026); 84th (PPP; 2026)
- GDP growth: ▲3.3% (2026); ▲3.5% (2027f); ▲3.5% (2028f)
- GDP per capita: ▲$21,282 (nominal; 2026); ▲$34,214 (PPP; 2026)
- GDP per capita rank: 57th (nominal, 2026); 67th (PPP, 2026)
- GDP by sector: agriculture: 5.5%; industry: 18.6%; services: 75.9%; (2016 estimate)
- Inflation (CPI): ▲ -0.33% (May 2024)
- Population below national poverty line: ▼20.3% (2024); ▼13% on less than $8.30/day (2024)
- Gini coefficient: ▼45.8 high (2024)
- Human Development Index: ▲0.833 very high (2023) (62nd); ▲0.678 medium IHDI (65th) (2023)
- Labor force: ▲2,407,610 (2023); ▲54.5% employment rate (2022)
- Unemployment: ▼6.9% (2024)
- Average gross salary: ₡759,095 / $1,498 monthly (2024)
- Average net salary: ₡678,100 / $1,339 monthly (2024)
- Main industries: medical equipment, food processing, textiles and clothing, construction materials, fertilizer, plastic products

External
- Exports: ▲$33.68 billion (2023 est.)
- Export goods: bananas, pineapples, coffee, melons, ornamental plants, sugar; beef; seafood; electronic components, medical equipment
- Main export partners: United States 40.9%; Belgium 6.3%; Panama 5.6%; Netherlands 5.6%; Nicaragua 5.1%; Guatemala 5%; (2017)
- Imports: ▲$28.41 billion (2023 est.)
- Import goods: raw materials, consumer goods, capital equipment, petroleum, construction materials
- Main import partners: United States 38.1%; China 13.1%; Mexico 7.3%; (2017)
- FDI stock: ▲$33.92 billion (31 December 2017 est.); ▲ Abroad: $4.007 billion (31 December 2017 est.)
- Current account: ▼ −$1.692 billion (2017 est.)
- Gross external debt: ▲$26.83 billion (31 December 2017 est.)

Public finance
- Government debt: ▼73.1% of GDP (2024 est.)
- Foreign reserves: ▲$12.84 billion (Nov, 2023 est.)
- Budget balance: −6.1% (of GDP) (2017 est.)
- Revenue: 8.357 billion (2017 est.)
- Spending: 11.92 billion (2017 est.)
- Credit rating: BB− per Standard & Poor's (2017)
- All values, unless otherwise stated, are in US dollars.

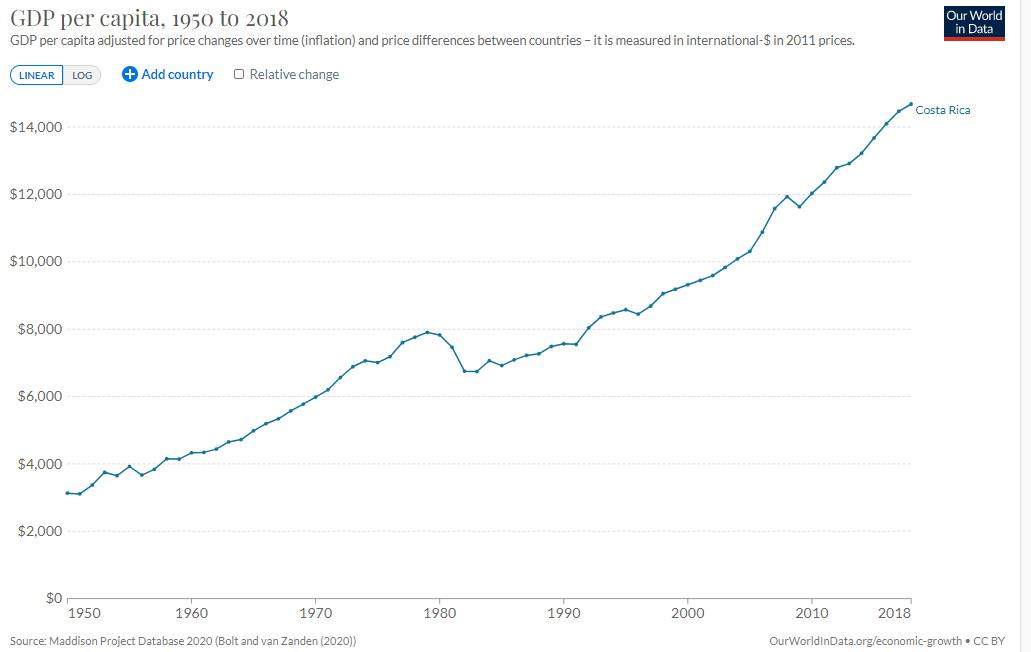
Real GDP per capita development in Costa Rica

The economy of Costa Rica has been very stable for some years now, with continuing growth in the GDP (Gross Domestic Product) and moderate inflation, though with a high unemployment rate: 11.49% in 2019. Costa Rica's economy emerged from recession in 1997 and has shown strong aggregate growth since then. The estimated GDP for 2026 is US$125 billion, up significantly from the US$52.6 billion in 2015 while the estimated 2026 per capita (purchasing power parity) is Int$33,897.

Inflation remained around 4% to 5% per annum for several years up to 2015 but then dropped to 0.7% in 2016; it was expected to rise to a still moderate 2.8% by the end of 2017 In 2017, Costa Rica had the highest standards of living in Central America in spite of the high poverty level. The poverty level dropped by 1.2% in 2017 to 20.5%, thanks to reducing inflation and benefits offered by the government. The estimated unemployment level in 2017 was 8.1%, roughly the same as in 2016.

The country has evolved from an economy that once depended solely on agriculture, to one that is more diverse, based on tourism, electronics and medical components exports, medical manufacturing and IT services. Corporate services for foreign companies employ some 3% of the workforce. Of the GDP, 5.5% is generated by agriculture, 18.6% by industry and 75.9% by services (2016). Agriculture employs 12.9% of the labor force, industry 18.57%, services 69.02% (2016) Many foreign companies operate in the various Free-trade zones. In 2015, exports totalled US$12.6 billion while imports totalled US$15 billion for a trade deficit of US$2.39 billion.

The growing debt and budget deficit are the country's primary concerns. By August 2017, Costa Rica was having difficulty paying its obligations and the President promised dramatic changes to handle the "liquidity crisis". Other challenges face Costa Rica in its attempts to increase the economy by foreign investment. They include a poor infrastructure and a need to improve public sector efficiency.

== History ==
The Economic Miracle of Ochomogo refers to the unprecedented economic growth between 1949 and 1980 that the Costa Rican economy underwent after the great economic and social reforms imposed by the Founding Junta of the Second Republic in 1949 as the aftermath of the 1948 Costa Rican Civil War. During this period, life expectancy nearly doubled, from 47 to 73 years.

The factors that led to this massive growth were largely:

- The entry of women into the workforce.
- Industrialization policies by the Figueres Ferrer administration and the Founding Board during 1949, 1953–1958 and from 1970 to 1974 focused on protectionism towards the cooperative agro-industrial sector.
- Political stability guaranteed by the constitutional and structural solidity of the state of Costa Rica after the second republic.
- The so-called "entrepreneur state" during the decades of the 60's and 70's where large state companies flooded the state coffers with fresh resources and generated internal chaining.
- Construction of the nation's major public works and modernization of the San José road network.

Although these policies are usually attributed to the rates of growth that the country experienced during the period between 1949 and 1980, it is also worth noting that state-owned enterprises were mostly inefficient, riddled with debt, which forced the country to borrow larger amounts each year, leading to a fiscal crisis in the late 1970's, and the largest economic downturn in the country's history.

== Public finances ==
The pattern of public expenditure and revenue in Costa Rica is typical of a middle income country. According to the CIA World Factbook, in 2023, central government revenue was US $26.333 billion, while expenditure was $25.953 billion.

=== Debt and deficit ===
One of the country's major concerns is the level of the public debt, especially as a percentage of the GDP (Gross Domestic Product), increasing from 29.8% in 2011 to 40.8% in 2015 and to 45% in 2016. The total debt in 2015 was $22.648 billion, up by nearly $3 billion from 2014. On a per capita basis, the debt was $4,711 per person. Costa Rica had a formal line of credit with the World Bank valued at US$947 million in April 2014, of which US$645 million had been accessed and US$600 million remained outstanding.

In a June 2017 report, the International Monetary Fund stated that annual growth was just over 4% with moderate inflation. The report added that "financial system appears sound, and credit growth continues to be consistent with healthy financial deepening and macroeconomic trends. The agency noted that the fiscal deficit remains high and public debt continues to rise rapidly despite the authorities' deepened consolidation efforts in 2016. Recent advances in fiscal consolidation have been partly reversed and political consensus on a comprehensive fiscal package remains elusive".

The IMF also expressed concern about increasing deficits, public debt and the heavy dollarization of bank assets and liabilities, warning that in tighter-than-expected global financial conditions these aspects would "seriously undermine investor confidence". The group also recommended taking steps to reduce pension benefits and increase the amount of contribution by the public and increasing the cost effectiveness of the education system.

The country's credit rating was reduced by Moody's Investors Service in early 2017 to Ba2 from Ba1, with a negative outlook on the rating. The agency particularly cited the "rising government debt burden and persistently high fiscal deficit, which was 5.2% of GDP in 2016". Moody's was also concerned about the "lack of political consensus to implement measures to reduce the fiscal deficit [which] will result in further pressure on the government's debt ratios". In late July 2017, the Central Bank estimated the budget deficit at 6.1 percent of the country's GDP. A 2017 study by the Organisation for Economic Co-operation and Development warned that reducing the foreign debt must be a very high priority for the government. Other fiscal reforms were also recommended to moderate the budget deficit.

In 2014, President Solís presented a budget with an increase in spending of 19% for 2015, an increase of 0.5% for 2016 and an increase of 12% for 2017. When the 2017 budget was finally proposed, it totaled US$15.9 billion. Debt payments account for one-third of that amount. Of greater concern is the fact that a full 46% of the budget will require financing, a step that will increase the debt owed to foreign entities. In late July 2017, the Central Bank estimated the budget deficit at 6.1 percent of the country's GDP.

=== Liquidity crisis ===
In early August 2017, President Luis Guillermo Solís admitted that the country was facing a "liquidity crisis", an inability to pay all of its obligations and to guarantee the essential services. To address this issue, he promised that higher VAT and higher income tax rates were being considered by his government. Such steps were essential, Solís told the nation. "Despite all the public calls and efforts we have made since the start of my administration to contain spending and increase revenues, there is still a gap that we must close with fresh resources", he said. The crisis was occurring in spite of the growth, low inflation and continued moderate interest rates, Solís concluded.

Solís explained that the Treasury would prioritize payments on the public debt first, then salaries, and then pensions. The subsequent priorities included transfers to institutions "according to their social urgency". All other payments would be made only if funds are available.

== Other challenges ==
A 2016 report by the U.S. government report identifies other challenges facing Costa Rica as it works to expand its economy by working with potential foreign investors:

- The ports, roads, water systems would benefit from major upgrading. Attempts by China to invest in upgrading such aspects were "stalled by bureaucratic and legal concerns".
- The bureaucracy is "often slow and cumbersome".
- The country needs even more workers who are fluent in English and languages such as Portuguese, Mandarin and French. It would also benefit from more graduates in Science, Technology, Engineering and Math (STEM) programs.
- Some sectors are controlled by a state monopoly which excludes competition but in other respects, "Costa Rican laws, regulations and practices are generally transparent and foster competition".
- The country has been slow in completing environmental impact assessments which have caused delays in projects being completed.
- Product registration is a slow process, although this may improve with digitization.
- In spite of government attempts at improving the enforcement of intellectual property laws, this aspect remains a concern.

== Natural resources ==
Costa Rica's rainfall, and its location in the Central American isthmus, which provides easy access to North and South American markets and direct ocean access to the European and Asian Continents. Costa Rica has two seasons, both of which have their own agricultural resources: the tropical wet and dry seasons. One-fourth of Costa Rica's land is dedicated to national forests, often adjoining beaches, which has made the country a popular destination for affluent retirees and ecotourists.

A full 10.27% of the country is protected as national parks while an additional 17% is set aside for reserves, wildlife refuges and protected zones. Costa Rica has over 50 wildlife refuges, 32 major national parks, more than 12 forest reserves and a few biological reserves.

Because of ocean access, 23.7% of Costa Rica's people fish and trade their catches to fish companies; this is viewed as "small scale artisanal coastal" fishing and is most common in the Gulf of Nicoya. Costa Rica also charges licensing fees for commercial fishing fleets that are taking tuna, sardines, banga mary, mahi-mahi, red tilapia, shrimp, red snapper, other snappers, shark, marlin and sailfish. In mid 2017, the country was planning to ban large-scale commercial fishing off the southern Pacific Coast in an area nearly a million acres in size. The bill in congress was intended to "protect the extraordinary marine and coastal resources" from "indiscriminate and unsustainable commercial fishing."

Sport fishing in Costa Rica is an important part of the tourism industry; species include marlin, sailfish, dorado, tarpon, snook, rooster fish, wahoo, tuna, mackerel, snapper and rainbow bass.

In terms of the 2012 Environmental Performance Index ranking, Costa Rica is 5th in the world, and first among the Americas. The World Economic Forum's 2017 Travel & Tourism Competitiveness Report ranked Costa Rica as third of 136 countries based on natural resources, the number of World Heritage natural sites, protected areas and species as well as eco tourism.

== Economic sectors ==
=== Agriculture ===
Costa Rica's economy was historically based on agriculture, and this has had a large cultural impact through the years. Costa Rica's main cash crop, historically and into modern times, has been the banana. The coffee crop had been a major export, but decreased in value to the point where it added only 2.5% to the 2013 exports of the country.

Agriculture also plays an important part in the country's gross domestic product (GDP). It makes up about 6.5% of Costa Rica's GDP, and employs 12.9% of the labor force (2016). By comparison, industry employs 18.57% of the labor force, and the service sector 69.02%.

Depending on location and altitude, many regions differ in agricultural crops and techniques. The main agricultural exports from the country include: bananas, pineapples (the second highest export, with over 50% share of the world market), other tropical fruits, coffee (much of it grown in the Valle Central or Meseta Central), sugar, rice, palm oil, vegetables, tropical fruits, ornamental plants, maize, and potatoes.

Livestock activity consists of cattle, pigs and horses, as well as poultry. Meat and dairy produce are leading exports according to one source, but both were not in the top 10 categories of 2013.

The combined export value of forest products and textiles in 2013 did not exceed that of either chemical products or plastics.

=== Mining ===
Mining in Costa Rica contributes a small amount to the economy. In 2018 5.2 tons of gold were produced.

=== Industries ===
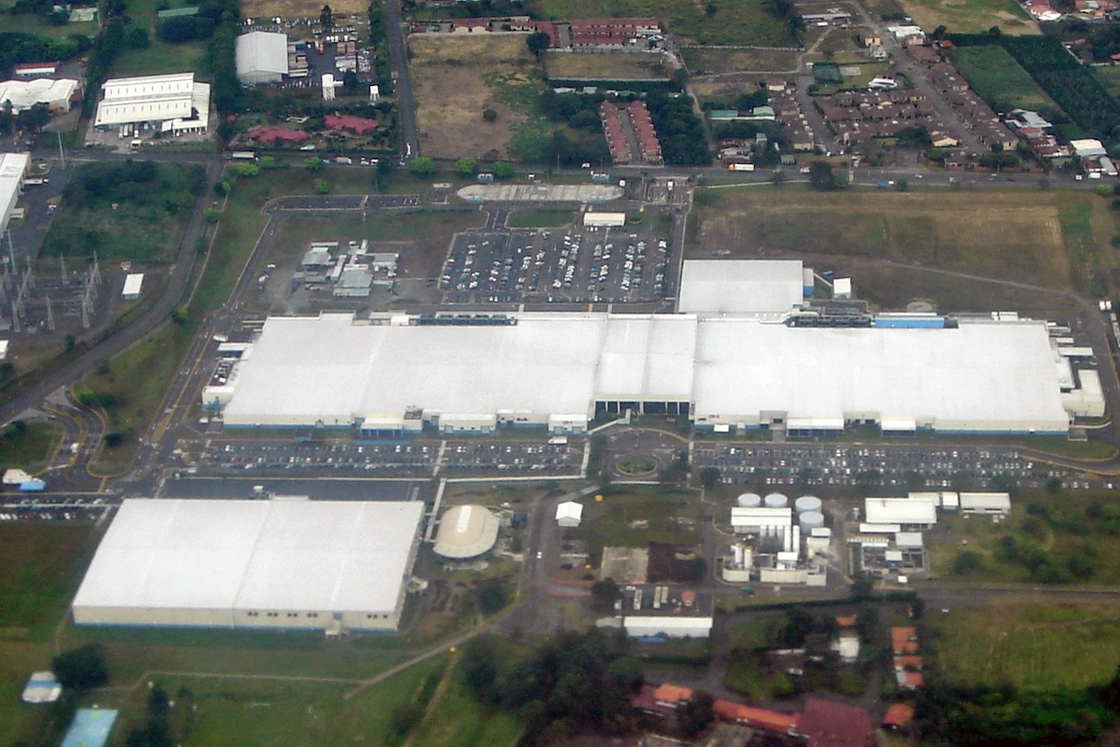
Intel microprocessor facility in Costa Rica

Over the years, Costa Rica successfully attracted important investments by such companies as Intel Corporation, Procter & Gamble, Abbott Laboratories and Baxter Healthcare. Manufacturing and industry's contribution to GDP overtook agriculture over the course of the 1990s, led by foreign investment in Costa Rica's Free Trade Zones (FTZ) where companies benefit from investment and tax incentives. Companies in such zones must export at least 50% of their services. Well over half of that type of investment has come from the U.S. According to the government, the zones supported over 82 thousand direct jobs and 43 thousand indirect jobs in 2015; direct employment grew 5% over 2014. The average wages in the FTZ increased by 7% and were 1.8 times greater than the average for private enterprise work in the rest of the country. Companies with facilities in the America Free Zone in Heredia, for example, include Dell, HP, Bayer, Bosch, DHL, IBM and Okay Industries.

In 2006 Intel's microprocessor facility alone was responsible for 20% of Costa Rican exports and 4.9% of the country's GDP. In 2014, Intel announced it would end manufacturing in Costa Rica and lay off 1,500 staff but agreed to maintain at least 1,200 employees. The facility continued as a test and design center with approximately 1,600 remaining staff. In 2017, Intel had 2000 employees in the country, and was operating a facility which assembles, tests and distributes processors and a Global Innovation Center, both in Heredia.

The fastest growing aspect of the economy is the provision of corporate services for foreign companies which in 2016 employed approximately 54,000 people in a country with a workforce under 342,000; that was up from 52,400 the previous year. For example, Amazon.com employs some 5,000 people. Many work in the free-trade areas such as Zona Franca America and earn roughly double the national average for service work. This sector generated US$4.6 billion in 2016, nearly as much as tourism.

In 2013, the total FDI stock in Costa Rica amounted to about 40 percent of GDP, of which investments from the United States accounted for 64 percent, followed by the United Kingdom and Spain with 6 percent each. Costa Rica's outward foreign direct investment stock is small, at about 3 percent of GDP as of 2011, and mainly concentrated in Central America (about 57 percent of the total outward direct investment stock).

=== Services ===
==== Education ====
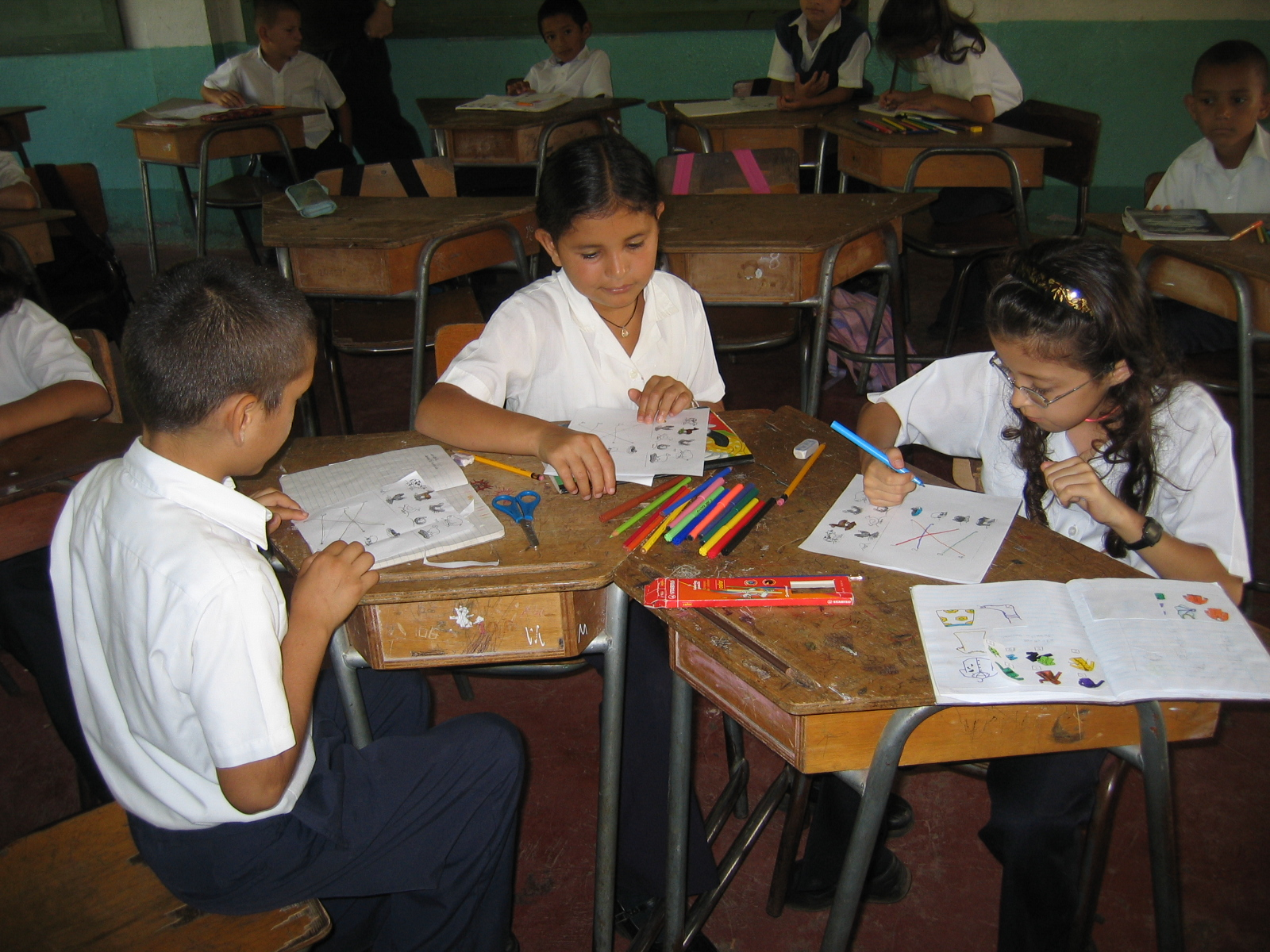
Second graders working in Centro Educativo Linda Vista de Santa Rosa, Guanacaste.

Education in Costa Rica is divided in 3 cycles: pre-education (before age 7), primary education (from 6-7 to 12-13), and secondary school (from 12-13 to 17-18), which leads to higher education. School year starts between the second and third week of February, stops at the last week of June, it continues again between the third and fourth week of July and finishes between the last week of November (private kindergartens, schools and high schools) and the second week of December (public kindergartens, schools and high schools). Preschool and basic education are free to the public. Elementary and secondary school are both divided in two cycles. Since 1869, education is free and compulsory (article 78 of the constitution).

Costa Rica's education system is ranked 54th in the "Global Competitiveness Report 2013–14", and is described as of "high quality". The literacy rate in Costa Rica is 97.9%. It is 2 points over the average for Latin American and Caribbean countries.

The Human Rights Measurement Initiative (HRMI) finds that Costa Rica is fulfilling only 87.4% of what it should be fulfilling for the right to education based on the country's level of income. HRMI breaks down the right to education by looking at the rights to both primary education and secondary education. While taking into consideration Costa Rica's income level, the nation is achieving 91.9% of what should be possible based on its resources (income) for primary education but only 82.9% for secondary education.

==== Healthcare ====
Life expectancy in Costa Rica

Costa Rica provides universal health care to its citizens and permanent residents. Both the private and public health care systems in Costa Rica are continually being upgraded. Statistics from the World Health Organization (WHO) frequently place Costa Rica in the top country rankings in the world for long life expectancy. WHO's 2000 survey ranked Costa Rica as having the 36th best health care system, placing it one spot above the United States at the time. In addition, the UN (United Nations) has ranked Costa Rica's public health system within the top 20 worldwide and the number 1 in Latin America.

The Human Rights Measurement Initiative finds that Costa Rica is fulfilling 94.7% of what it should be fulfilling for the right to health based on its level of income. When looking at the right to health with respect to children, Costa Rica achieves 97.7% of what is expected based on its current income. In regards to the right to health amongst the adult population, the country achieves 94.8% of what is expected based on the nation's level of income. Costa Rica falls into the "fair" category when evaluating the right to reproductive health because the nation is fulfilling 91.7% of what the nation is expected to achieve based on the resources (income) it has available.

==== Tourism ====
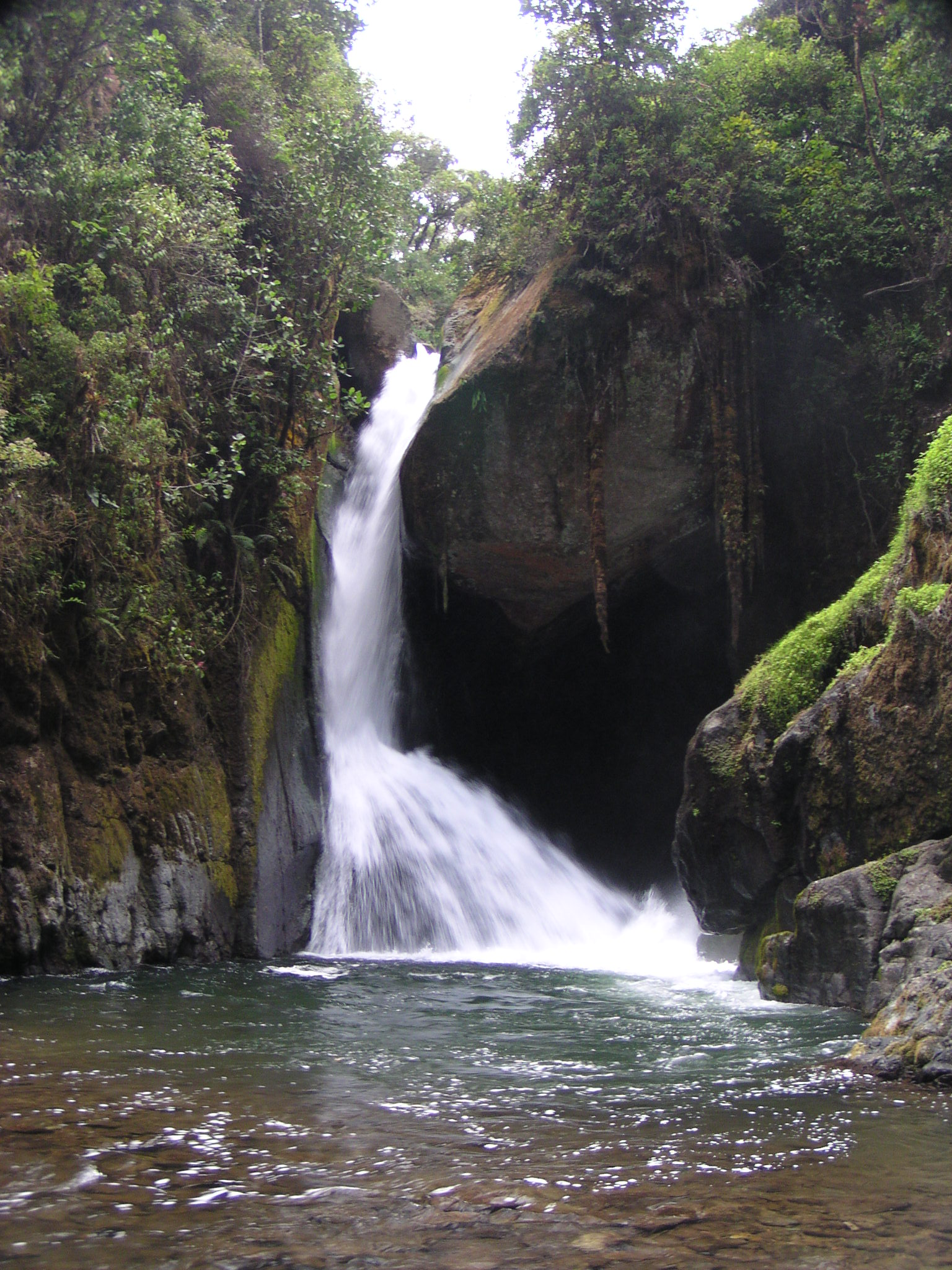
Ecotourism is key in Costa Rica's tourism industry. Shown Savegre River, Talamanca.

Tourism is an important part of the economy, with the number of visitors increasing from 780,000 in 1996, to 1 million in 1999, and to 2.089 million foreign visitors in 2008, allowing the country to earn $2.144-billion in that year. By 2016, 2.6 million tourists visited Costa Rica, spending roughly US$3.4 billion. Tourism directly supported 110,000 jobs and indirectly supported 271,000 in 2016.

With a $1.92-billion-a-year tourism industry, Costa Rica was the most visited nation in the Central American region, with 2.42 million foreign visitors in 2013. By 2016, 2.6 million tourists visited Costa Rica. The Tourism Board estimates that this sector's spending in the country represented over US$3.4 billion, or about 5.8% of the GDP. The World Travel & Tourism Council's estimates indicate a direct contribution to the 2016 GDP of 5.1% and 110,000 direct jobs in Costa Rica; the total number of jobs indirectly supported by tourism was 271,000.

Ecotourism is extremely popular with the many tourists visiting the extensive national parks and protected areas around the country. Costa Rica was a pioneer in this type of tourism and the country is recognized as one of the few with real ecotourism. Other important market segments are adventure, sun and beaches. Most of the tourists come from the U.S. and Canada (46%), and the EU (16%), the prime market travelers in the world, which translates into a relatively high expenditure per tourist of $1000 per trip.

In the 2008 Travel and Tourism Competitiveness Index (TTCI), Costa Rica reached the 44th place in the world ranking, being the first among Latin American countries, and second if the Caribbean is included. Just considering the subindex measuring human, cultural, and natural resources, Costa Rica ranks in the 24th place at a worldwide level, and 7th when considering just the natural resources criteria. The TTCI report also notes Costa Rica's main weaknesses, ground transport infrastructure (ranked 113th), and safety and security (ranked 128th).

The online travel magazine Travelzoo rated Costa Rica as one of five "Wow Deal Destinations for 2012". The magazine Travel Weekly named Costa Rica the best destination in Central and South America in 2011. In 2017, the country was nominated in the following categories in the World Travel Awards: Mexico & Central America's Leading Beach Destination, Mexico & Central America's Leading Destination and Mexico & Central America's Leading Tourist Board.

== Infrastructure ==
Costa Rica's infrastructure has suffered from a lack of maintenance and new investment.

The country has an extensive road system of more than 30,000 kilometers, although much of it is in disrepair; this also applies to ports, railways and water delivery systems. According to a 2016 U.S. government report, investment from China which attempted to improve the infrastructure found the "projects stalled by bureaucratic and legal concerns".

Most parts of the country are accessible by road. The main highland cities in the country's Central Valley are connected by paved all-weather roads with the Atlantic and Pacific coasts and by the Pan American Highway with Nicaragua and Panama, the neighboring countries to the North and the South. Costa Rica's ports are struggling to keep pace with growing trade. They have insufficient capacity, and their equipment is in poor condition. The railroad didn't function for several years, until recent government effort to reactivate it for city transportation. An August 2016 OECD report provided this summary: "The road network is extensive but of poor quality, railways are in disrepair and only slowly being reactivated after having been shut down in the 1990s, seaports quality and capacity are deficient. Internal transportation overly relies on private road vehicles as the public transport system, especially railways, is inadequate."

In a June 2017 interview, President Luis Guillermo Solís said that private sector investment would be required to solve the problems. "Of course Costa Rica's infrastructure deficit is a challenge that outlasts any one government and I hope that we have created the foundations for future administrations to continue building. I have just enacted a law to facilitate Public Private Partnerships, which are the ideal way to develop projects that are too large for the government to undertake. For example the new airport that we are building to serve the capital city will cost $2 billion, so it will need private-sector involvement. There is also the potential for a 'dry canal' linking sea ports on our Atlantic and Caribbean Coasts that could need up to $16 billion of investment."

The government hopes to bring foreign investment, technology, and management into the telecommunications and electrical power sectors, which are monopolies of the state. ICE (Instituto Costarricense de Electricidad) has the monopoly on telecommunications, internet and electricity services. Some limited competition is allowed. In 2011, two new private companies began offering cellular phone service and others offer voice communication over internet connections (VOIP) for overseas calls.

Costa Rica has not discovered sources of fossil fuels—apart from minor coal deposits—but its mountainous terrain and abundant rainfall have permitted the construction of a dozen hydroelectric power plants, making it self-sufficient in all energy needs, except for refined petroleum. In 2017, Costa Rica was considering the export of electricity to neighbouring countries. Mild climate and trade winds make neither heating nor cooling necessary, particularly in the highland cities and towns where some 90% of the population lives.

Renewable energy is the new norm. In 2016, 98.1 per cent of the country's electricity came from green sources: hydro generating stations, geothermal plants, wind turbines, solar panels and biomass plants.

Costa Rica has made significant progress in the past decade in expanding access to water supply and sanitation, but the sector faces key challenges in low sanitation connections, poor service quality, and low cost recovery.

== Corruption ==
According to transparency.org, Costa Rica had a reputation as one of the most stable, prosperous, and among the least corrupt in Latin America in 2007. However, in fall 2004, three former Costa Rican presidents, José María Figueres, Miguel Angel Rodríguez, and Rafael Angel Calderon, were investigated on corruption charges related to the issuance of government contracts. After extensive legal proceedings Calderon and Rodriguez were sentenced; however, the inquiry on Figueres was dismissed and he was not charged.

More recently, Costa Rica reached 40th place in 2015, with a score of 55 on the Perception of Corruption scale; this is better than the global average. Countries with the lowest perceived corruption rated 90 on the scale. In late May 2017, Costa Rica applied to become a member of the OECD Anti-Bribery Convention, to be effective in July 2017.

== Foreign trade ==
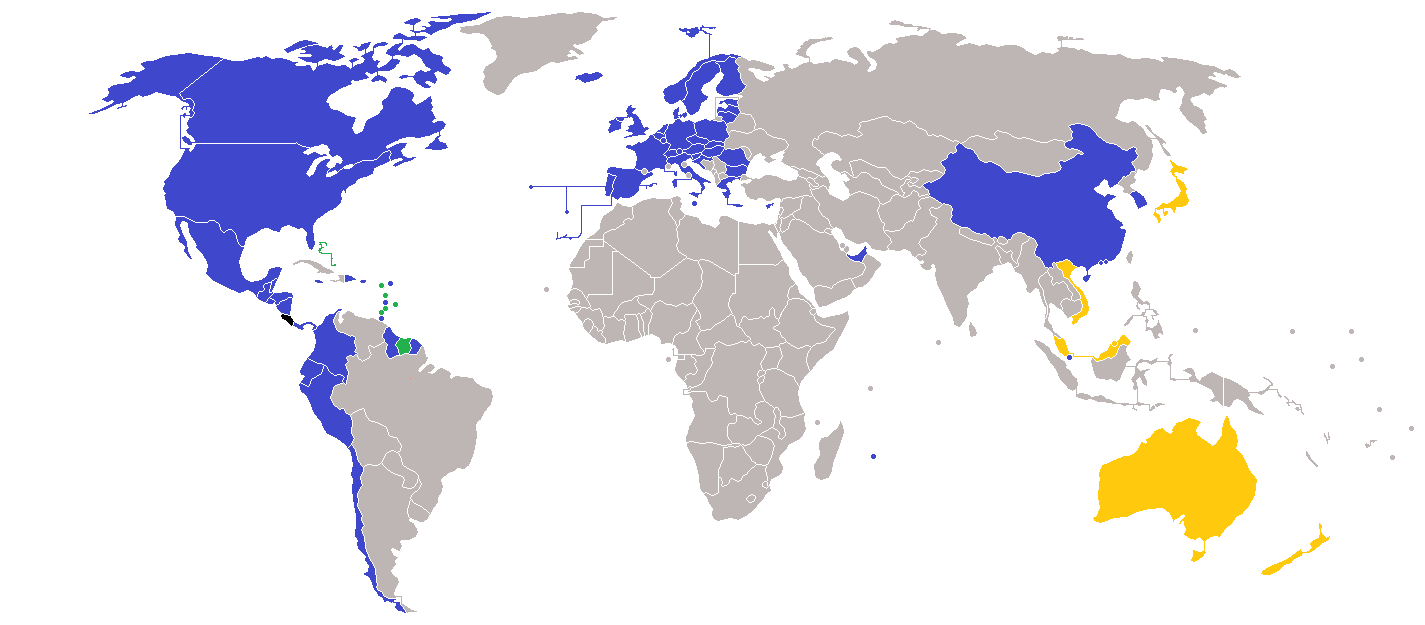
FTA Costa Rica has approved / is negotiating

Exports of Costa Rica by product category (2019) Chemical products Transportation Machines Mineral products Plastics and rubbers Metals Foodstuffs Precious metals Textiles Instruments Animal products Vegetable products Paper goods Footwear and headwear Miscellaneous Stone and glass Wood products Animal and vegetable bi-products Animal hides Arts and antiques Weapons

Mere decades ago, Costa Rica was known principally as a producer of bananas and coffee. Even though bananas, pineapple, sugar, coffee, lumber, wood products and beef are still important exports. However, in recent times medical instruments, electronics, pharmaceuticals, financial outsourcing, software development, and ecotourism are now the prime exports. High levels of education and fluency in English among its residents make the country an attractive investing location.

In 2015 the following were the major export products (US$): medical instruments ($2 billion), bananas ($1.24B), tropical fruits ($1.22B), integrated circuits ($841 million) and orthopedic appliances ($555M). The total exports in 2015 were US$12.6 billion, down from $18.9B in 2010; bananas and medical instruments were the two largest sectors. Total imports in 2015 were $15B, up from $13.8B in 2010; this resulted in a trade deficit.

Costa Rica has sought to widen its economic and trade ties, both within and outside the region. Costa Rica signed a bilateral trade agreement with Mexico in 1994, which was later amended to cover a wider range of products. Costa Rica joined other Central American countries, plus the Dominican Republic, in establishing a Trade and Investment Council with the United States in March 1998, which later became the Dominican Republic–Central America Free Trade Agreement (CAFTA-DR).

Costa Rica has bilateral free trade agreements with the following countries and blocs which took effect on (see date):

- Canada (November 1, 2002)
- Caribbean Community (CARICOM)¨ (November 15, 2002)
- Chile (February 15, 2002)
- China (August 1, 2011).
- Colombia (September 2016)
- Dominican Republic (March 7, 2002)
- El Salvador Customs union, (1963, re-launched on October 29, 1993)
- European Free Trade Association (2013)
- European Union (October 1, 2013)
- Guatemala Customs union, (1963, re-launched on October 29, 1993)
- Honduras Customs union, (1963, re-launched on October 29, 1993)
- Mexico (January 1, 1995)
- Nicaragua Customs union, (1963, re-launched on October 29, 1993)
- Panama (July 31, 1973, renegotiated and expanded for January 1, 2009)
- Peru (June 1, 2013)
- United States (January 1, 2009, CAFTA-DR)
- Singapore (April 6, 2010)
- South Korea (March 18, 2019)
- United Kingdom (1 January 2021) (Central America–United Kingdom Association Agreement)

There are no significant trade barriers that would affect imports and the country has been lowering its tariffs in accordance with other Central American countries. Costa Rica also is a member of the Cairns Group, an organization of agricultural exporting countries that are seeking access to more markets to increase the exports of agricultural products. Opponents of free agricultural trade have sometimes attempted to block imports of products already grown in Costa Rica, including rice, potatoes, and onions. By 2015, Costa Rica's agricultural exports totalled US$2.7 billion.

In 2015, the top export destinations for all types of products were the United States (US$4.29 billion), Guatemala ($587 million), the Netherlands ($537 million), Panama ($535 million) and Nicaragua ($496 million). The top import origins were the United States ($6.06 billion), China ($1.92 billion), Mexico ($1.14 billion), Japan ($410 million) and Guatemala ($409 million). The most significant products imported were Refined Petroleum (8.41% of the total imports) and Automobiles (4.68%). Total imports in 2015 were US$15 billion, somewhat higher than the total exports of a US$12.6 billion, for a negative trade balance of US$2.39 billion.

== Foreign direct investment ==
The Costa Rican government has and is "actively courting" foreign direct investment (FDI) in order to help develop its economy. FDI is a form of investment that promotes development in key industries such as manufacturing, medicine, and tourism. FDI's influence provides a very lucrative opportunity for foreign investors, which is what continues to attract such large investments year after year. FDI inflows to Costa Rica have increased; net FDI inflow averaged $44 million dollars per year from 1970 to 1979, and ten years later had risen to $416 million. The 2022 data show that Costa Rica received $3 billion in FDI which accounted for 4.45% of their total GDP.

Growth in FDI is linked to rising tourist arrivals, with the number rising from 2.1 million in 2011 to 3.1 million in 2019. Facilitation of FDI growth is seen as an essential role of the Costa Rican government. Throughout 2019 and 2022, the government of Costa Rica was able to court investment for a total of 16 new FDI projects, with one of the more notable projects being a luxury hotel named One and Only Papagayo.

== Statistics ==
The following table shows the main economic indicators in 1980–2019 (with IMF staff stimtates in 2020–2025). Inflation below 5% is in green.

Year	GDP (in Bil. US$PPP)	GDP per capita (in US$ PPP)	GDP (in Bil. US$nominal)	GDP per capita (in US$ nominal)	GDP growth (real)	Inflation rate (in Percent)	Unemployment (in Percent)	Government debt (in % of GDP)
1980	8.2	3,560.1	4.9	2,108.8	▲0.8%	▲18.1%	5.9%	n/a
1981	▲8.8	▲3,696.2	▼2.6	▼1,111.4	▼-2.3%	▲36.8%	▲8.8%	n/a
1982	▼8.6	▼3,532.8	2.6	▼1,071.9	▼-7.3%	▲90.3%	▲9.4%	n/a
1983	▲9.2	▲3,669.0	▲3.2	▲1,257.4	▲2.9%	▲32.5%	▼9.2%	n/a
1984	▲10.3	▲3,990.2	▲3.7	▲1,421.2	▲8.0%	▲12.0%	▼5.4%	n/a
1985	▲10.7	▲4,024.5	▲3.9	▲1,478.4	▲0.7%	▲15.1%	▲6.8%	n/a
1986	▲11.6	▲4,206.3	▲4.4	▲1,611.3	▲5.5%	▲11.8%	▼6.2%	n/a
1987	▲12.4	▲4,391.3	▲4.6	▲1,612.6	▲4.8%	▲16.8%	▼5.6%	n/a
1988	▲13.3	▲4,577.5	4.6	▼1,598.0	▲3.4%	▲20.8%	▼5.5%	n/a
1989	▲14.6	▲4,898.1	▲5.3	▲1,763.5	▲5.7%	▲16.5%	▼3.8%	n/a
1990	▲15.7	▲5,137.4	▲5.7	▲1,880.8	▲3.6%	▲19.1%	▲4.6%	n/a
1991	▲16.6	▲5,307.6	▲7.2	▲2,305.4	▲2.3%	▲20.2%	▲5.5%	n/a
1992	▲18.5	▲5,798.8	▲8.6	▲2,684.1	▲9.2%	▲21.8%	▼4.1%	n/a
1993	▲20.3	▲6,195.0	▲9.6	▲2,926.9	▲7.1%	▲9.8%	4.1%	n/a
1994	▲21.7	▲6,421.8	▲10.5	▲3,110.2	▲4.5%	▲13.6%	▲4.2%	n/a
1995	▲23.0	▲6,637.5	▲11.6	▲3,336.7	▲4.2%	▲23.2%	▲5.2%	n/a
1996	▲23.8	▲6,668.1	▲11.7	▼3,277.6	▲1.4%	▲17.5%	▲6.2%	33.7%
1997	▲25.5	▲6,974.7	▲12.6	▲3,450.9	▲5.5%	▲13.3%	▼5.7%	▼30.6%
1998	▲27.6	▲7,375.4	▲13.7	▲3,653.2	▲7.2%	▲11.7%	▼5.6%	▲40.7%
1999	▲29.2	▲7,610.4	▲14.3	▲3,715.4	▲4.2%	▲10.0%	▲6.0%	▼39.0%
2000	▲31.0	▲8,142.2	▲15.0	▲3,941.1	▲3.9%	▲11.0%	▼5.2%	▼38.9%
2001	▲32.8	▲8,304.2	▲16.0	▲4,041.9	▲3.5%	▲11.3%	▲6.1%	▲39.6%
2002	▲34.5	▲8,572.1	▲16.6	▲4,122.8	▲3.4%	▲9.2%	▲6.4%	▲41.4%
2003	▲36.7	▲8,975.9	▲17.3	▲4,227.8	▲4.3%	▲9.4%	▲6.7%	▼40.6%
2004	▲39.3	▲9,473.0	▲18.6	▲4,483.6	▲4.4%	▲12.3%	▼6.5%	▲41.0%
2005	▲42.2	▲10,005.8	▲20.0	▲4,756.3	▲4.0%	▲13.8%	▲6.6%	▼37.3%
2006	▲46.7	▲10,906.2	▲22.7	▲5,309.3	▲7.3%	▲11.5%	▼6.0%	▼33.0%
2007	▲51.9	▲11,948.7	▲26.9	▲6,194.0	▲8.2%	▲9.4%	▼4.6%	▼27.0%
2008	▲55.4	▲12,570.4	▲30.8	▲6,993.9	▲4.7%	▲13.4%	▲4.9%	▼24.0%
2009	▼55.2	▼12,357.3	▼30.7	▼6,879.3	▼-0.9%	▲7.8%	▲7.8%	▲26.0%
2010	▲58.9	▲12,931.5	▲37.7	▲8,268.9	▲5.4%	▲5.7%	▲9.2%	▲28.1%
2011	▲62.8	▲13,605.9	▲42.8	▲9,270.6	▲4.4%	▲4.9%	▲10.5%	▲29.5%
2012	▲67.1	▲14,367.7	▲47.2	▲10,107.5	▲4.9%	▲4.5%	▼9.8%	▲33.7%
2013	▲71.2	▲15,034.6	▲50.9	▲10,764.5	▲2.5%	▲5.2%	▼8.3%	▲35.1%
2014	▲77.0	▲16,076.6	▲52.0	▲10,853.6	▲3.5%	▲4.5%	▲9.7%	▲37.4%
2015	▲82.9	▲17,079.8	▲56.4	▲11,635.2	▲3.7%	▲0.8%	▼9.6%	▲39.8%
2016	▲90.8	▲18,503.2	▲58.8	▲11,986.9	▲4.2%	▲0.0%	▼9.5%	▲44.1%
2017	▲97.9	▲19,711.7	▲60.5	▲12,185.3	▲4.2%	▲1.6%	▼9.3%	▲47.1%
2018	▲102.9	▲20,480.0	▲62.4	▲12,428.9	▲2.6%	▲2.2%	▲12.0%	▲51.8%
2019	▲107.1	▲21,093.9	▲64.1	▲12,623.2	▲2.3%	▲2.1%	▲12.4%	▲56.7%
2020	▼103.9	▼20,268.7	▼61.8	▼12,057.0	▼-4.1%	▲0.7%	▲20.0%	▲67.5%
2021	▲111.9	▲21,592.5	▼61.5	▼11,860.2	▲3.9%	▲1.3%	▼16.3%	▲71.2%
2022	▲119.0	▲22,725.7	▲64.4	▲12,294.1	▲3.5%	▲1.5%	▼14.0%	▲73.3%
2023	▲125.6	▲23,739.7	▲68.2	▲12,883.9	▲3.1%	▲1.8%	▼12.0%	▲73.7%
2024	▲132.4	▲24,774.6	▲72.2	▲13,509.2	▲3.1%	▲2.1%	▼10.5%	▼73.1%
2025	▲139.7	▲25,852.6	▲76.4	▲14,140.2	▲3.2%	▲2.5%	▼9.5%	▼71.6%
2026	▲147.3	▲26,977.3	▲81.1	▲14,853.3	▲3.3%	▲2.9%	▼9.0%	▼69.2%

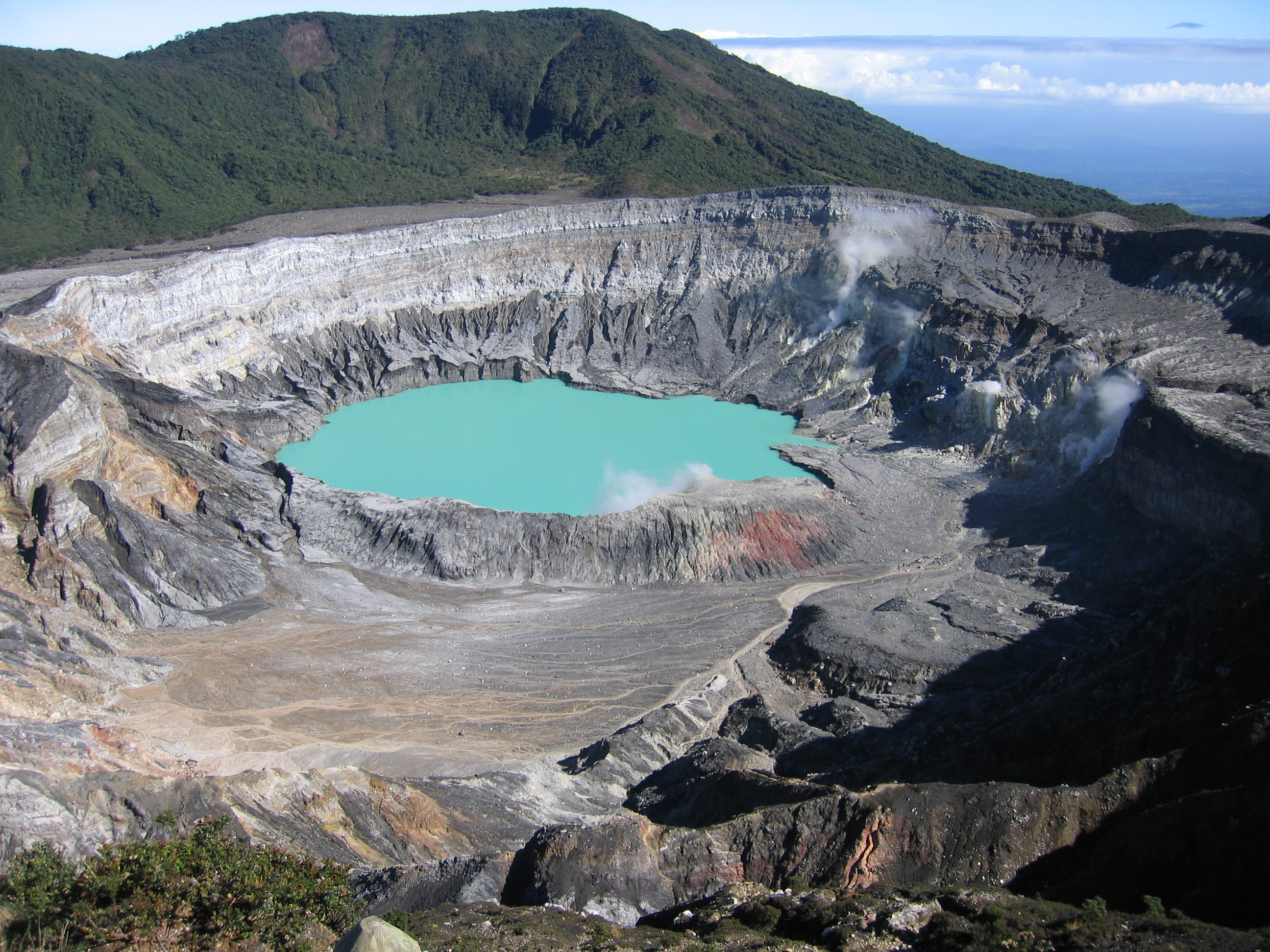
Poás Volcano Crater is one of Costa Rica's main tourist attractions.

GDP: US$61.5 billion (2017 estimate)

GDP real growth rate: 4.3% (2017 estimate)

GDP per capita: purchasing power parity: $12,382 (2017 estimate)

GDP composition by sector: agriculture: 5.5% (2016 estimate) Bananas, pineapples, coffee, beef, sugarcane, rice, corn, dairy products, vegetables, timber, fruits and ornamental plants. industry: 18.6% (2016 estimate) Electronic components, food processing, textiles and apparel, construction materials, cement, fertilizer. services: 75.9% (2016 estimate) Hotels, restaurants, tourist services, banks, call centers and insurance.

Government bond ratings: (January 2017) Standard & Poor's: BB−; Moody's: Ba2

Budget deficit: 6.1 percent of the GDP

Population below poverty line: 20.5% (2017)

Household income or consumption by percentage share: lowest 10%: 1.2% highest 10%: 39.5% (2009 est.)

Inflation rate (consumer prices): 2.6% (2017 estimate)

Labor force: 2.295 million (2016) Note: 15 and older, excluding Nicaraguans living in the country

Labor force by occupation: agriculture 12.9%, industry 18.57%, services 69.02% (2016)

Unemployment rate: 8.1% (2017 estimate)

Budget: US15.9 billion (2017 proposed) Note: 46% will require financing

Industries: microprocessors, food processing, textiles and clothing, construction materials, fertilizer, plastic products

Industrial production growth rate: 4.3% (2013)

Electricity production: 9.473 billion kWh (2010)

Electricity production by source: 98.1% from "green sources" (2016)

Agriculture products: bananas, pineapples, other tropical fruits, coffee, palm oil, sugar, corn, rice, beans, potatoes, beef, timber

Exports: US$12.6 billion (2015)

Major export commodities: Medical Instruments ($2B), Bananas ($1.24B), Tropical Fruits ($1.22B), Integrated Circuits ($841M) and Orthopedic Appliances ($555M).

Export partners (2016): United States ($4.29B), Guatemala ($587M), the Netherlands ($537M), Panama ($535M), Nicaragua ($496M)

Imports: US $15.1 billion (2015)

Major import commodities: Refined Petroleum ($1.26B), Cars ($702M), Packaged Medicaments ($455M), Broadcasting Equipment ($374M) and Computers ($281M).

Origin of imports (2016): United States ($6.06B), China ($1.92B), Mexico ($1.14B), Japan ($410M) and Guatemala ($409M).

External debt: US$26.2 billion (January 2016)

Economic aid – recipient: $107.1 million (1995)

Currency: 1 Costa Rican colon (₡) = 100 centimos

Exchange rates: Costa Rican colones (₡) per US$1 – 526.46 (March 27, 2015), US$1 – 600 (late May 2017), US$1 – 563 (end of July 2017), US$1 – 677 (May 2022)

Fiscal year: January 1 – December 31

== See also ==
- List of companies of Costa Rica
- Costa Rica and the World Bank
- Central Bank of Costa Rica
- Ministry of Finance (Costa Rica)
- Ministry of Foreign Trade (Costa Rica)
- Costa Rican Social Security Fund
- National Insurance Institute
- Costa Rican Foreign Trade Promoter
- Ministry of Science, Innovation, Technology and Telecommunications
- Trade unions in Costa Rica
- Economy of Central America
- Economy of North America
