= Café Britt =

Costa Rican food company

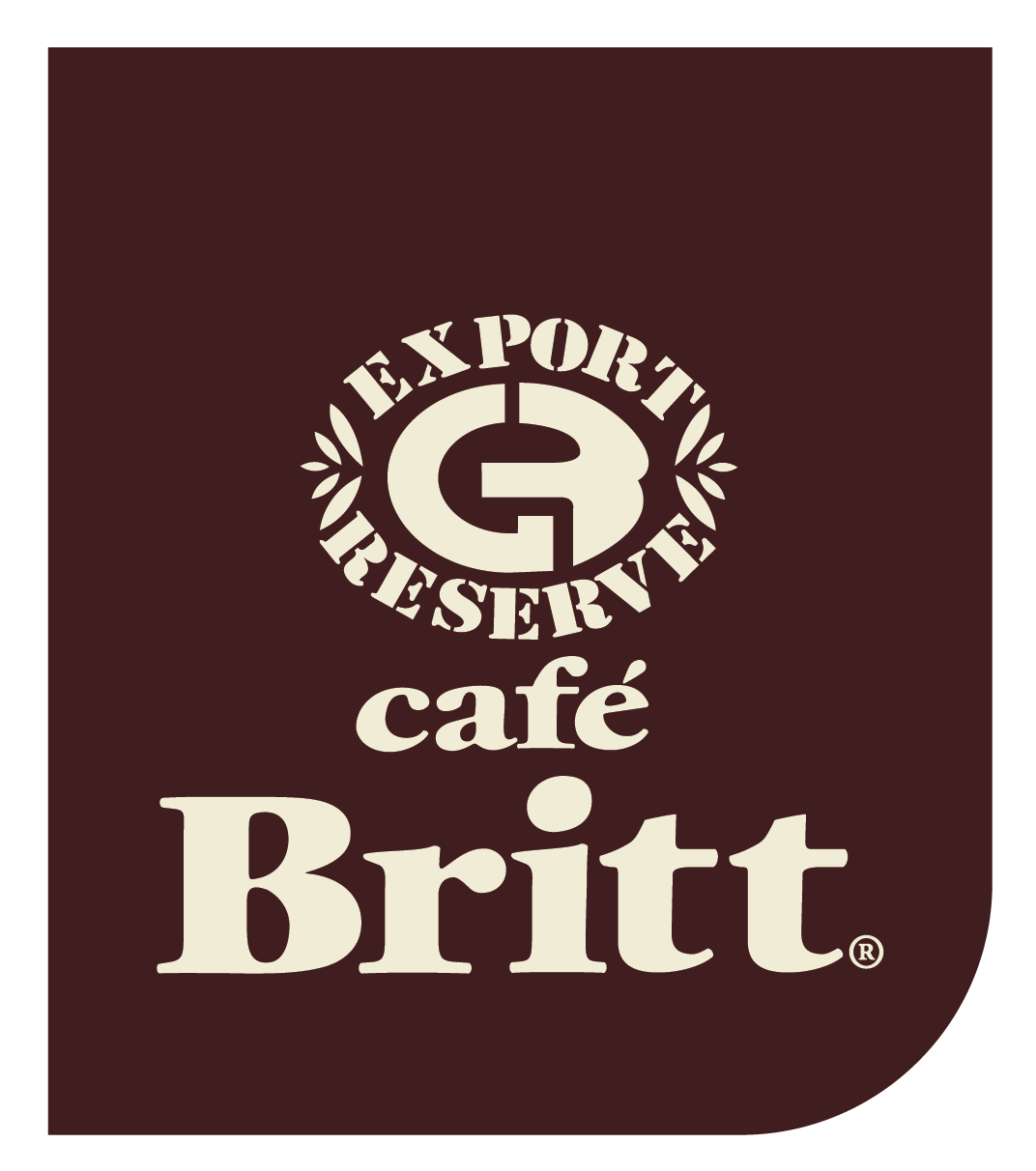
- Industry: Coffee roasting and chocolate manufacturing
- Founded: 1985
- Founder: Steve Aronson
- Headquarters: Heredia, Costa Rica
- Products: Costa Rican, Colombian, and Peruvian coffees, chocolates, nuts, candies, and gourmet products
- Services: Coffee tour
- Parent: Grupo Arribada
- Website: cafebritt.com

Café Britt is a Costa Rican company that produces and markets gourmet coffee, chocolate and other products. They create and sponsor coffee-related tourism and education in Costa Rica. Products are sold in retailers, online, in Britt Café • Bakery locations, and in Grupo Arribada-owned Morpho Travel Experience. The company currently employs around 400 people. Its coffee-roasting and chocolate-making operations are based in Costa Rica and Peru.

== History ==
North American coffee broker Steve Aronson founded the company in 1985 to market roasted Costa Rican coffees to the domestic market. It was the first gourmet coffee roaster in the country; since at that time, most high-quality coffee was exported to foreign markets. Aronson decided to promote the idea that good quality should also be consumed locally. The name Britt is a tribute to Scandinavian countries, which are some of the largest consumers of coffee; Britt was chosen through a contest to pick a name.

The company expanded its operations with the introduction of chocolates in 2000, as well as opening its first store at Juan Santamaría Airport in 2001. In 2003 it added further stores at various hotels popular with tourists in Costa Rica. In 2005 new stores were opened in Perú, the Caribbean, and Chile. In 2009, after a successful transition, Philippe Aronson replaced his father and assumed the role of president.

In 2017, Grupo Arribada split into two different companies: Morpho Travel Experience and Café Britt. This allowed the company to focus on producing and commercializing gourmet products, operating cafés, and running the Britt Coffee Tour. Philippe Aronson is the CEO of Café Britt.

== Products ==
Café Britt produces and sells gourmet products, with a focus on coffee and chocolate. Product lines includes Café Britt, Britt Chocolates, and Britt Cookies. The company offers capsules for espresso machines under the brand Britt Espresso, as well as related espresso machines.

In 2017, Café Britt opened the first location of its eponymous café, Britt Café & Bakery.

== Tourism ==
In 1991, Café Britt founded Costa Rica's first coffee tour, the "Britt Coffee Tour," as a play staged in its own coffee plantation. Currently the tour offers an interactive journey through the coffee production cycle. Some 50,000 people take the Britt Coffee Tour each year, and more than half a million people have taken it since its founding. In addition to the general tour, technically oriented versions of the tour have been developed for visiting coffee experts or serious amateurs.

Café Britt is one of the companies that has the seal of the essential COSTA RICA country brand.

== Environment ==
Café Britt has sold certified organic coffee since 1991. Currently, the company produces more than 200,000 bags of organic coffee a year, 80% of which is sold in Costa Rica.

The production of Café Britt coffee and chocolate in Costa Rica has been certified Carbon Neutral since 2013.

== See also ==
- Coffee production in Costa Rica
- Economy of Costa Rica
- Tourism in Costa Rica
- List of coffee companies
