= Nature Air Flight 144 =

2017 aviation accident in Costa Rica

Coordinates: 9°51′25″N 85°22′15″W

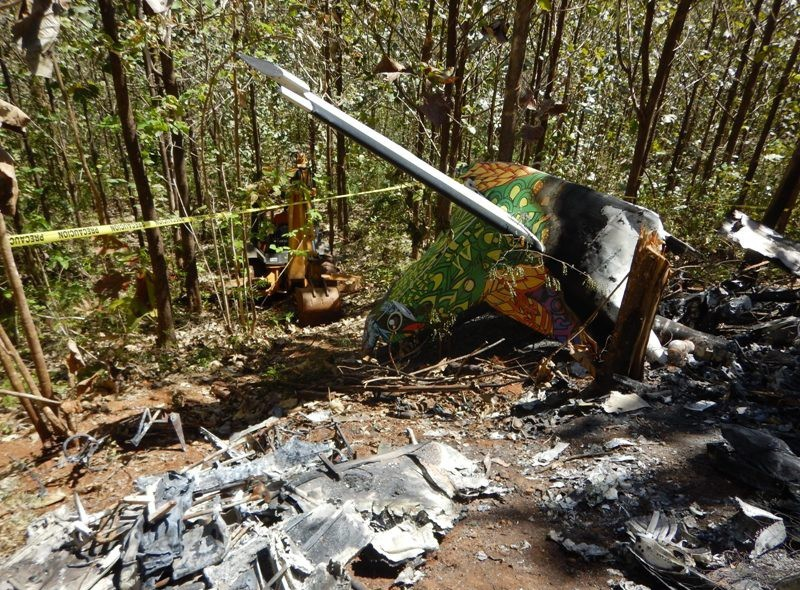
- Wreckage of the aircraft

Accident
- Date: 31 December 2017
- Summary: Stalled and crashed on climb-out over rising terrain
- Site: 15 km (10 mi) east of Playa Sámara in the Nandayure canton, Punta Islita, Costa Rica

Aircraft
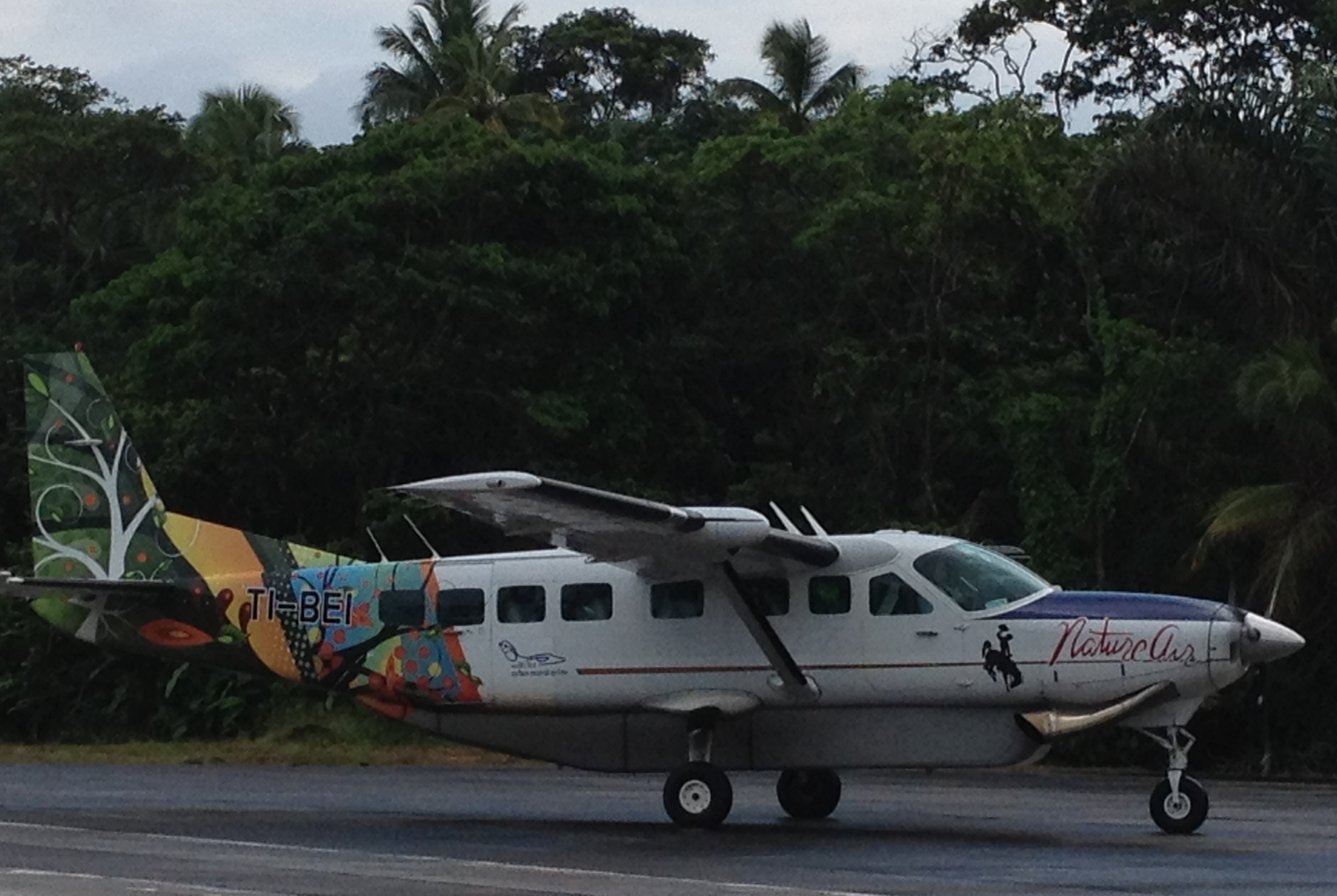
- TI-BEI, the aircraft involved in the accident, seen in 2012 with a previous livery
- Aircraft type: Cessna 208 Caravan
- Operator: Nature Air
- IATA flight No.: 5C144
- ICAO flight No.: NRR144
- Call sign: NATURE 144
- Registration: TI-BEI
- Flight origin: Punta Islita Airport, Punta Islita, Costa Rica
- Destination: Juan Santamaría International Airport, San José, Costa Rica
- Occupants: 12
- Passengers: 10
- Crew: 2
- Fatalities: 12
- Survivors: 0

Nature Air Flight 144 crashed into terrain on 31 December 2017 shortly after takeoff from Punta Islita Airport in Nandayure, Guanacaste Province, Costa Rica, for a chartered domestic passenger flight to Costa Rica's capital San José killing all 12 people on board. The flight, with a planned duration of 40 minutes, was operated by Costa Rican regional airline Nature Air and the aircraft involved was a Cessna 208B Caravan manufactured in 2001. On board the aircraft were 10 passengers, mostly American tourists, and 2 pilots. An NTSB investigation later determined that the accident was caused by the aircraft entering an aerodynamic spin/stall that was the result of pilot error. Nature Air permanently ceased operations following the accident.

== Accident flight ==
The flight was one of two that had been chartered by Backroads Travel Company and took off from the airport at Punta Islita, a small beach town on the Pacific coast of Costa Rica at 12:10 p.m local time. It was carrying 10 passengers, including two American families of tourists, plus two local pilots. The flight was destined for the Juan Santamaría International Airport in Costa Rica's capital San José where the passengers would connect with an international flight to return home to the United States. The accident aircraft had arrived late in Punta Islita due to strong winds and on the outbound leg landed at an intermediate point at the airstrip in Tambor where pilots waited for better weather conditions.

Seconds after departure, the aircraft swayed to the left. It then rolled, the wing clipped trees and the plane impacted rising terrain near the airport, exploded and burst into flames. The aircraft could not be contacted and was declared missing. Approximately at 12:30 p.m, emergency services near the airport received reports that the aircraft had crashed into the woods. Emergency service sent 20 vehicles, including ambulances and 45 firefighters. Tourists and locals who saw the crash also rushed to the crash site and assisted the rescue operation.

Photos published from Costa Rica's Ministry of Public Security revealed that the aircraft was pulverized on impact. The fire chief of Nandayure, Hector Chavéz, stated that the scene was a "total destruction". It crashed inverted with no survivors. By 07:00 p.m local time, rescuers had recovered all the victims of the flight.

== Passengers and crews ==
The victims were two families of American tourists, an American tour guide and two Costa Rican crew. Among the dead was the pilot, Captain Juan Manuel Retana, the cousin of Costa Rica's former president Laura Chinchilla. He had accrued a total of 15,000 flying hours. Before he joined Nature Air, he worked at Costa Rica's regional airline SANSA for 14 years. The other crew member was identified by the Costa Rican media as Emma Ramos.

== Investigation ==
The Costa Rican Government opened an investigation into the cause of the crash on 1 January 2018. The investigation was conducted by Costa Rica DGAC. The United States National Transportation Safety Board (NTSB) was expected to assist the Costa Rican authorities in the investigation, as most of the passengers were of American origin. On 18 May, the GAC offered to delegate the investigation to the NTSB. The NTSB accepted the offer on 30 May 2018.

In the initial stage of the investigation, investigators cited mechanical failure, human factors, and adverse weather condition as the cause of the crash. Multiple reports gathered from eyewitnesses revealed that the weather conditions in Punta Islita were inclement. Gusts of 20 knots (37 km/h; 23 mph) were reported. Another witness stated that the aircraft flew too low. Enio Cubillo, head of the Costa Rican DGAC, stated that the investigation of Flight 144 would take months.

On 8 January 2018, Costa Rica's Organismo de Investigación Judicial (Judicial Investigation Organisation) raided the offices of Nature Air in Tobías Bolaños International Airport in Pavas and the Juan Santamaria International Airport in San José. They also raided the offices of the Costa Rica Dirección General de Aviación Civil in La Uruca as part of the investigation of the crash. At least 30 agents participated in the operation with the objective to obtain files on the pilots and on the Cessna 208 Caravan as well as the identities of those in charge of the maintenance and whoever authorized the flight.

In December 2019, two years after the crash, the NTSB released the final report on the accident. It had been caused by the following:

The flight crew's failure to maintain airspeed while maneuvering to exit an area of rising terrain, which resulted in an exceedance of the airplane's critical angle of attack and an aerodynamic stall. Contributing to the accident was the flight crew's decision to continue the takeoff toward rising terrain that likely exceeded the airplane's climb capability, the lack of adequate weather reporting available for wind determination, and the lack of documented training for an airport requiring a non-standard departure.

== Aftermath ==
The crash highlighted the danger of privately chartered tourist passenger flights, causing concern among Costa Ricans who work in the tourism industry. In the immediate aftermath of the crash, Fox News warned their readers about the danger of flying on privately chartered flights, indicating that they are not properly regulated. The former head of the National Transportation Safety Board also warned Americans not to fly on privately chartered flights in Costa Rica. Isabel Vargas, the president of the Costa Rican National Chamber of Tourism disputed the claims, as did the Costa Rican director of Civil Aviation, Ennio Cubillo, who called the claims that chartered flights are not subject to proper safety oversight irresponsible reporting.
