= Costa Rica and the World Bank =

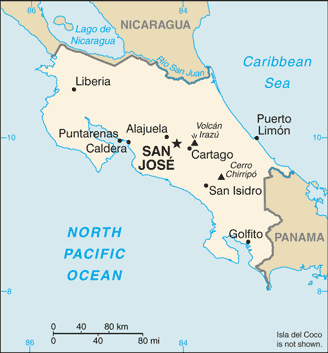
Map of Costa Rica

The World Bank and Costa Rica have two active projects as of December 2018. The World Bank has been able to claim Costa Rica as a developmental success. Although Costa Rica has been actively working on reform to better the country and has the lowest poverty rate in Central America, it still remains a developing nation, due to a slowdown in economic expansion, lack of job opportunities and lack of resources, especially in rural areas. Despite these challenges Costa Rica has been working with the World Bank to further move Costa Rica up the global ranks.

== Country overview ==
Costa Rica has become one of the more wealthy countries in the region overall, being an upper middle income country with GDP per capita being US$13,876. Costa Rica differentiates from its neighbors by being relatively stable politically, providing high standards of living and effective social benefit systems.

The country's main income source besides exports is ecotourism, due to the biodiversity in the country. Although advanced economically and policy wise for the region, Costa Rica has struggled with the poverty rate, stagnant for the past twenty years. Costa Rica has made strides towards universal health care and education.

With projects like Costa Rica Higher Education and Strengthening Universal Health Insurance in Costa Rica, done with The World Bank, Costa Rica has the opportunity to make desired changes with the funds it receives for these projects. Costa Rica began their relationship with the World Bank in September 1956 when they received US$3 million for the Capital Goods Importation Credit Project. Costa Rica currently has an LPI score of 2.79 and the LPI rank of 73 as of 2018. Since then, Costa Rica has seen stable economic growth for the past 25 years, growing GDP from 2010 to 2016 and being a leader in environmental policies. With growing inequality and rising fiscal debt, the government has struggled on how to address these issues with regards to the general public and transparent social programs.

== Relationship with World Bank ==
The World Bank's first project in Costa Rica began in 1956, the World Bank's involvement continued until 1990.

The World Bank office in San Jose closed in 1990 due to unwelcoming political climate at the time. Costa Rica shifted to eco-market projects, and the World Bank eventually reentered involvement in Costa Rica.

== Active projects ==
As of 2018, there were two active projects within Costa Rica with the World Bank that total US$620 million. Strengthening Universal Health Insurance in Costa Rica, is a project, approved on March 15, 2016, with the commitment amount of US$420 million. The Costa Rica Higher Education is the second project within Costa Rica and the World Bank, that was approved on September 27, 2012, with the commitment of 200 million US dollars.

The main goals of Strengthening Universal Health Insurance in Costa Rica were to provide timely and quality health services, and to improve the Costa Rican social security administration (CCSS) to be more efficient. This project sought to replace severally damaged hospitals so that the CCSS could open up more resources for other investments, including hospitals, while also strengthening health care programs for the countries population. This project was set to close in April 2020.

The Costa Rica Higher Education project's main purpose was to strengthen the educational system within Costa Rica so that they will be more appealing to outside investments for scientific and technology development and innovation. This project was set to close in December 2019.
