= Skyway Costa Rica =

IATA	ICAO	Call sign
LC	-	-
- Founded: 2017; 9 years ago
- Hubs: Juan Santamaría International Airport
- Focus cities: Bocas del Toro; Liberia; Drake Bay; Puerto Jimenez; Quepos; Tambor; Tamarindo
- Fleet size: 3
- Destinations: 9
- Headquarters: Alajuela, Costa Rica
- Key people: Kenneth Roqhuett CEO
- Website: skywaycr.com

Skyway Costa Rica is a regional airline based in San José, Costa Rica. It operates daily scheduled passenger services to 8 domestic destinations and 1 international destination. Its hub is located at Juan Santamaría International Airport.

== Destinations ==
Skyway Costa Rica operates scheduled services to the following destinations:

Costa Rica:

- Drake Bay (Drake Bay Airport)
- La Fortuna / Arenal (La Fortuna Airport)
- Liberia (Guanacaste Airport)
- Puerto Jiménez (Puerto Jiménez Airport)
- Quepos / Manuel Antonio (La Managua Airport)
- San José (Juan Santamaría International Airport) — '''Hub'''
- Playa Tamarindo (Tamarindo Airport)
- Tambor (Tambor Airport) === Panama
- Bocas del Toro (José Ezequiel Hall International Airport)

== Fleet ==
Skyway Costa Rica started operations with 3 Let L-410 Turbolet aircraft.

Aircraft	In service	Passengers
Let L-410UVP-E20	3	19
Total	3	
