= Realtime Gaming =

Online casino company

- Industry: Gaming industry Gambling industry
- Founded: 1998 in Atlanta, Georgia
- Headquarters: Heredia, Costa Rica
- Area served: International (online)
- Parent: Hastings International
- Website: Official website

Real Time Gaming (RTG) is an online casino company developing download-based casino software, licensed by various operators running their own branded RTG-powered casino sites. The company was established in Atlanta, Georgia in 1998, but moved all development to Heredia, Costa Rica in 2007-2008.

The company was acquired in January 2007 by Hastings International, Curaçao, Netherlands Antilles, a company managed by a corporate services provider called HBM Group.

== Caribbean 21 controversy ==
In 2004 the company made headlines when a player won $1.3 million from a $1,000 deposit while playing high- stakes Caribbean 21 at Hampton Casino. The same player also won $96,000 at Delano casino, another RTG-powered site.

The player was accused of cheating by the casino, who said he used a robot (automated playing program), and that he would not be paid. Since the game has a casino advantage (albeit a low advantage, somewhere over 0.1%), the casino should still have held the edge, though good luck can overcome an edge in the short and medium-term. The details of the player's final settlement with the casino were never published. RTG subsequently limited the maximum bet size of the game to $5, before removing it entirely.

== Operators ==
One of the largest RTG casino operators was the Crystal Palace group, mooted for a £140m flotation on London's AIM market in 2005. The group, owned by South African Warren Cloud, made a pre-tax profit that year of £20.4m. Cloud's casinos were the subject of numerous complaints particularly over payment of players who accepted bonuses from the casino. Cloud died suddenly on his yacht off Ibiza in July 2008, aged 34.

Aside from the Crystal Palace group, other RTG casinos have been the subject of criticism. The Casinomeister website maintains a list of RTG casinos, which lists several sites as 'rogue'. Ozwin Casino, an Australian RTG casino, isn't on the Casinomeister list, but it is one of four Australian gambling sites that the Australian Communications and Media Authority (ACMA) asked to be blocked earlier this year for violating the Interactive Gambling Act 2001. Despite attempts to block it, the Australian gambling media reported a significant win paid out by Ozwin Casino in September to an Australian player who won a jackpot of 65,500 UAD on the RTG game Diamond Fiesta.

== Software features ==
The company indicates that operators are not able to choose between payout settings for their slots and video poker games. They have expressed intentions to limit operator liability for a single game to $50,000 by default, by reducing maximum bet sizes.

Some RTG casinos offer progressive jackpot games with jackpots that are pooled between all the different casinos that offer these games. The largest of these jackpots are usually Jackpot Piñatas and Aztec's Millions. Compared to similarly-sized multi-million dollar jackpots offered by competing game developers such as Microgaming or Playtech, these jackpots are rarely won and their slow rate of increase suggests that they are not particularly popular. In addition the non-progressive RTG "Real Series" slot machines may be configured with tiered random progressive jackpots that are local to a specific casino, or a group of casinos that are run by the same operator. These local jackpots can be won randomly and independently of the alignment of symbols on the game reels on any spin. Operators are able to configure the jackpots on a per-game basis or group several games together in order to contribute to a shared local jackpot.

Slots manufacturers such as RTG began to produce cabinet-based video slots games with increasing numbers of special features like Feature Guarantee, Jackpot Pyramid, Boiling Point Jackpot, Suit ’em Up, Vegas Three Card Rummy. Additionally, the most popular games were migrated to Mobile versions, and such features like Instant Play and Download are also available for RTG-powered casinos. As slot machines evolved in the digital era, modern video slots introduced increasingly complex payline systems, with some games featuring hundreds of paylines.
