= Punta Islita Airport =

Airport in Costa Rica

Islita Airport
- IATA: PBP; ICAO: MRIA

Summary
- Airport type: Private
- Serves: Punta Islita, Costa Rica
- Location: Corozalito
- Elevation AMSL: 7 ft (2.1 m)
- Coordinates: 9°51′25″N 85°22′15″W
- Website: Punta Islita Airport

Map
- Location in Costa Rica

Runways
Direction	Length		Surface
Direction	m	ft	Surface
03/21	1,030	3,379	Asphalt

Statistics (2014)
- Passengers: 2766
- Passenger change 13–14: ▲51.2%
- Source: AIP GCM Google Maps SkyVector

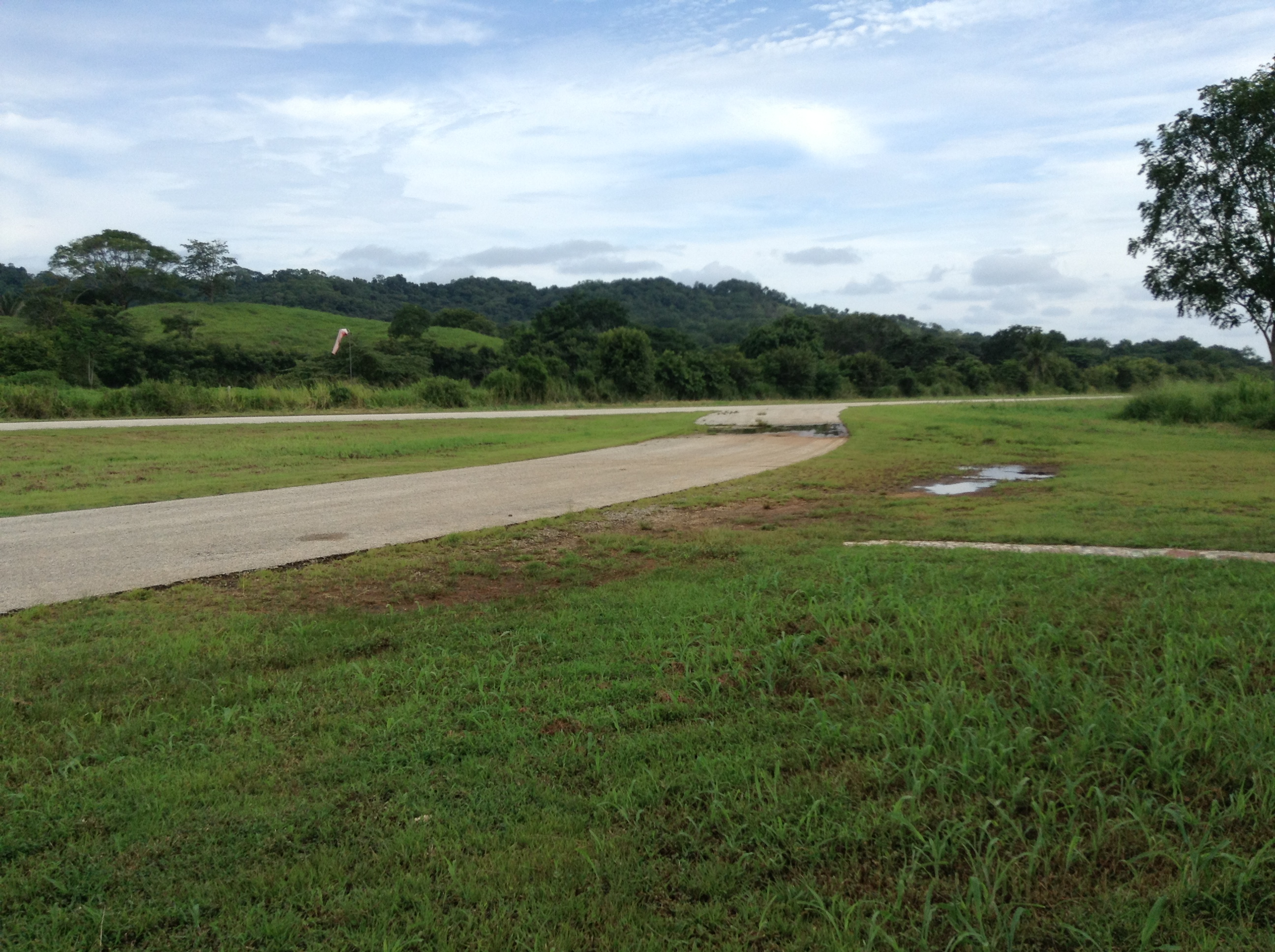

Islita Airport (IATA: PBP, ICAO: MRIA) is an airport that serves the communities of Punta Islita in the Nandayure Canton of Costa Rica. The airport is at the village of Corozalito, 3 kilometres (1.9 mi) east of Punta Islita. It is the main access to a series of secluded beaches in southern Nicoya Peninsula.

The airport is owned by a private administrator and currently has four weekly scheduled flights from San José and Nosara.

On December 31, 2017, a plane operated by Nature Air crashed shortly after takeoff from Punta Islita.

== Charter services ==
- Paradise Air

== Passenger statistics ==
These data show number of passengers movements into the airport, according to the Directorate General of Civil Aviation of Costa Rica's Statistical Yearbooks.

Year	2008	2009	2010	2011	2012	2013	2014	2015
Passengers	3,886	2,029	2,156	2,152	1,864	1,829	2,766	T.B.A.
Growth (%)	▼22.25%	▼47.79%	▲6.26%	▼0.19%	▼13.38%	▼1.88%	▲51.23%	T.B.A.
Source: Costa Rica's Directorate General of Civil Aviation (DGAC). Statistical Yearbooks (Years 2008, 2011, 2012, 2013, and 2014)

Year	2000	2001	2002	2003	2004	2005	2006	2007
Passengers	1,550	1,778	2,130	3,393	4,766	3,804	3,376	4,998
Growth (%)	N.A.	▲14.71%	▲19.80%	▲59.30%	▲40.47%	▼20.18%	▼11.25%	▲48.05%
Source: Costa Rica's Directorate General of Civil Aviation (DGAC). Statistical Yearbooks (Years 2000-2005, 2006, and 2007,)

== See also ==
- Transport in Costa Rica
- List of airports in Costa Rica
