= Aeropostal Alas de Centroamerica =

- Founded: 2003
- Ceased operations: 2007
- Hubs: Juan Santamaría International Airport
- Fleet size: 1
- Parent company: Aeropostal Alas de Venezuela
- Headquarters: San José, Costa Rica
- Key people: Rodrigo Troyo (General manager)
- Website: www.aeropostal.co.cr

Aeropostal Alas de Centroamerica was a low-cost airline based in San José, Costa Rica. Its main hub was Juan Santamaría International Airport.

== History ==
The airline was established in 2003 in San José by Aeropostal Alas de Venezuela. It started operations in October 2005. It ceased operations in 2007.

== Fleet ==
Aeropostal Alas de Centroamerica consisted of the following aircraft (by March 2007):

- 1 McDonnell Douglas DC-9-21 (TI-AZS)
