= Paradise Air =

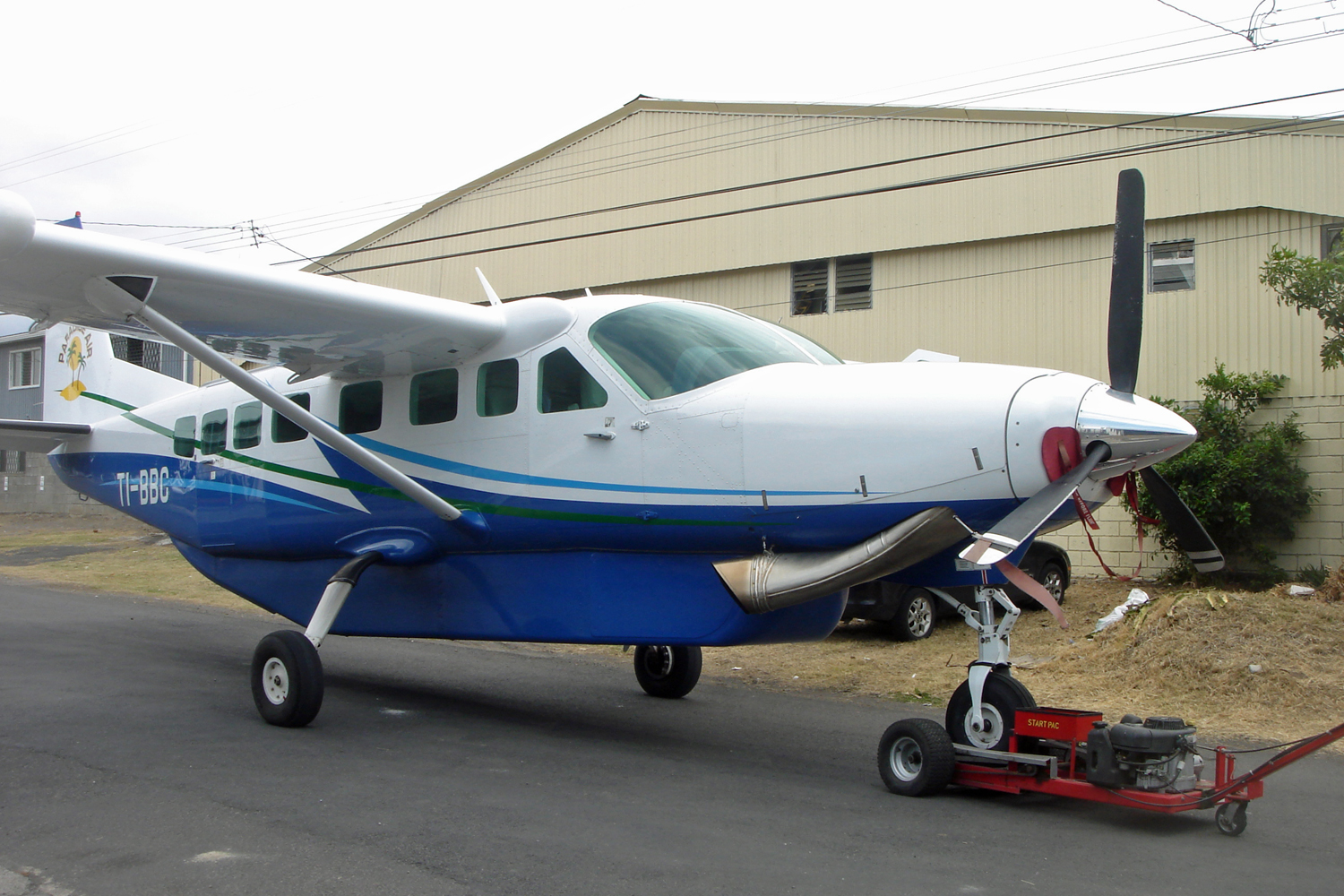
- Paradise Air aircraft at Tobías Bolaños International Airport
IATA	ICAO	Call sign
DJ	-	-
- Commenced operations: 2000
- Ceased operations: May 16, 2013
- Operating bases: Tobías Bolaños International Airport
- Fleet size: See Fleet below
- Destinations: See Destinations below
- Headquarters: San José, Costa Rica
- Key people: Art Dawley

Paradise Air was an air charter operator located in Costa Rica also flying to Panama, Nicaragua and throughout Central America and the Caribbean. The airline was based at the Tobías Bolaños International Airport, San José, Costa Rica and was the only FAA Part 129 approved charter operator in the region. The company, started in 2000, was owned and operated by a former corporate pilot, Art Dawley, who flew business jets for DreamWorks Movie Studios for many years. The charter company specialized in flying from San Jose to the various tourist based destinations throughout the region.

Effective May 16, 2013, Paradise Air has ceased air charter operations in Costa Rica.

== Former destinations ==
Costa Rica

- La Fortuna
- Barra de Colorado
- Barra de Tortuguero
- Playa Carrillo
- Drake Bay
- Golfito
- Jacó
- Liberia
- Limón
- Nicoya
- Nosara
- Palma Sur
- Puerto Jiménez
- Punta Islita Airport
- Quepos
- San Isidro
- Tamarindo
- Tambor

=== International ===
- Panama City, Panama
- Managua, Nicaragua
- Roatan, Honduras
- Belize City, Belize
- San Salvador, El Salvador
- Santo Domingo, Dominican Republic
- Grand Cayman Islands
- Havana, Cuba

== Former fleet ==
- Gippsland GA8 Airvan
- Cessna 208 Grand Caravan
