= Ticos Air =

Costa Rican airline

- Founded: 12 December 2012
- Ceased operations: 2014
- Headquarters: Santa Ana, Costa Rica
- Key people: Gino Renzi (CEO)

Ticos Air was a planned Costa Rican airline which never commenced operations.

== History ==
The airline's headquarters were located in Santa Ana, and they had hired 22 employees including pilots, administrative personnel, and operations managers. The airline planned to recruit 120 people, many from Avianca, which dismantled its Costa Rican hub in May 2013, dismissing 261 employees. Ticos Air was founded by Gino Renzi, a 54-year-old Tico publicist.

The airline initially planned to operate five Airbus A319 aircraft, and its inaugural destinations were supposed to be Mexico City, Caracas, Miami, and New York with ambitions to travel to South America, Europe, and Asia. Documentation to obtain an air operating certificate was submitted to the Directorate General of Civil Aviation in Costa Rica in September 2013.

It was reported in February 2014 that the company had been struggling to secure investment, and that its launch was possibly losing momentum. Ticos Air had not presented any promised Airbus A319 aircraft, and was therefore unable to advance to the third phase of its certification, as expected. In August 2014, Ticos Air decided to not start operations due to financial difficulties.
