= Nature Air =

Costa Rican regional airline

IATA	ICAO	Call sign
5C	NRR	NATUREAIR
- Founded: 1989
- Commenced operations: 1989
- Ceased operations: May 2, 2018
- Hubs: Juan Santamaría International Airport (SJO)
- Fleet size: 2
- Destinations: 15
- Headquarters: San José, Costa Rica
- Key people: Alex Khajavi (CEO & Founder)
- Employees: 100
- Website: www.natureair.com

Nature Air was a regional airline headquartered in San José, Costa Rica that offered a scheduled service to a range of tourist destinations in Costa Rica, Panama and Nicaragua. It operated scheduled domestic and international services, as well as charter services with turboprop aircraft. Its hub, operations and maintenance base was Juan Santamaría International Airport (SJO) having moved in 2013 from its original location at Aeropuerto Internacional Tobías Bolaños (SYQ). Claiming to be the world's first carbon neutral airline, it was one of the first airlines to publicize its sustainability credentials during a period of rapidly-expanding interest in eco-tourism. Nature Air received a number of awards, including a Global Vision Award for Sustainability from Travel + Leisure magazine in 2011. Its fleet consisted primarily of DHC-6 Twin Otter and Cessna 208 Grand Caravan turboprop aircraft that were ideally suited to short takeoff and landing characteristics of its destinations which often featured gravel or limited-paved landing strips. In 2010, Nature Air advertised 74 daily flights to 15 destinations in Costa Rica, Nicaragua and Panama. On 31 December 2017, all 10 passengers and two pilots aboard Nature Air Flight 144 were killed in an aerodynamic stall shortly after takeoff from Punta Islita airstrip. Although the accident was ultimately determined by the NTSB to have been caused by pilot error, Nature Air stopped flying in January 2018 and its operating license was indefinitely suspended by the civil aviation authority of Costa Rica on May 2, 2018 leading to the closure of the airline.

== History ==
The airline had its origins in 1989 with the founding of Travelair, a scheduled domestic air service in Costa Rica. In 2001, an international tourism consulting company called Naturegate, run by American entrepreneur Alex Khajavi, assumed control of the airline together with a group of Costa Rican staff and renamed it Nature Air with Khajavi as its CEO.

Between 2001 and 2016, the airline grew under its new management team and brand, boosted by the increasing popularity of Costa Rica as an eco-tourism and adventure travel destination. The short-haul destinations served by Nature Air offered foreign visitors a way to reach the most popular tourist areas of Costa Rica more quickly than by road particularly in the case of destinations without road access.

In around 2003, Nature Air introduced several DHC-6 Twin Otter series 300 aircraft to its fleet configured for 19 passengers and 2 pilots. The aircraft featured the 'Vistaliner' upgrade which refers to an FAA-approved modification to install larger windows to allow sightseeing by passengers.

In 2004 Nature Air declared itself the World's first Carbon Neutral airline as a result of its participation in a Costa Rica government certified carbon offsetting program. The airline calculated the tons of carbon released from the fuel burned each year in flight and ground operations and donated a corresponding amount of money to FONAFIFO, a rainforest financing division of the Environment Ministry. FONAFIFO operates a scheme to pay landowners to preserve important tracts of forest in the Osa Peninsula, a rainforest peninsula located in southwestern Costa Rica. Nature Air around this time also publicized its use of biodiesel derived from waste cooking oil in its ground vehicles.

In November 2011, Nature Air introduced two Cessna 208 Grand Caravan aircraft to its fleet for the first time, configured for 12 passengers and 2 pilots. By 2013, the airline was operating a mixed fleet of 3 Twin Otter and 2 Grand Caravan aircraft.

In 2013, Nature Air moved its hub from Aeropuerto Internacional Tobías Bolaños (SYQ), a secondary airport, to the main international airport of Costa Rica Juan Santamaría International Airport (SJO).

In November 2015, Nature Air changed its fleet to four leased Let 410 Turbolet turboprop aircraft configured for 19 passengers and 2 pilots. The company simultaneously announced that new routes would be added with the larger aircraft. On 19 July 2017, the four Let 410 aircraft were grounded and subsequently repossessed amid rumors of financial difficulties at the company and a dispute between Nature Air and the lessor of the aircraft.

In November 2017, Nature Air announced a new fleet of Twin Otter and Cessna Grand Caravan aircraft. At the same time, the company announced a series of new international routes.

The airline established the NatureKids Foundation, a non-profit entity that provided English language and basic computer education to young children living in the Drake Bay district of the Osa Peninsula of Costa Rica. Drake Bay was a popular destination served by the airline.

DGAC, the civil aviation authority of Costa Rica, indefinitely suspended Nature Air's operating permit on May 2, 2018. The reason given by the authority was the abandonment by Nature air of its authorized flight segments and a lack of aircraft.

== Destinations ==
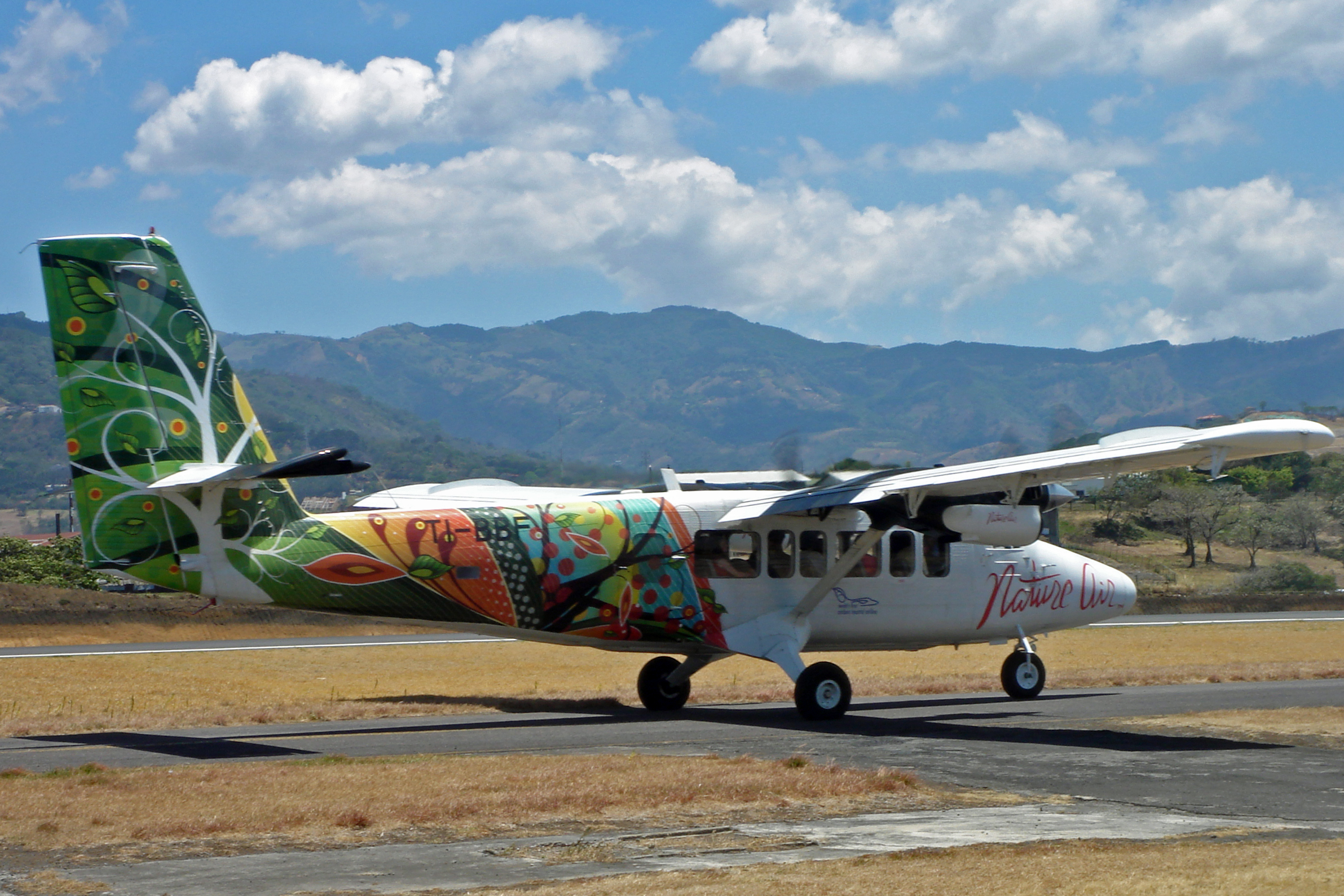
A Nature Air Twin Otter at the Juan Santamaría Airport

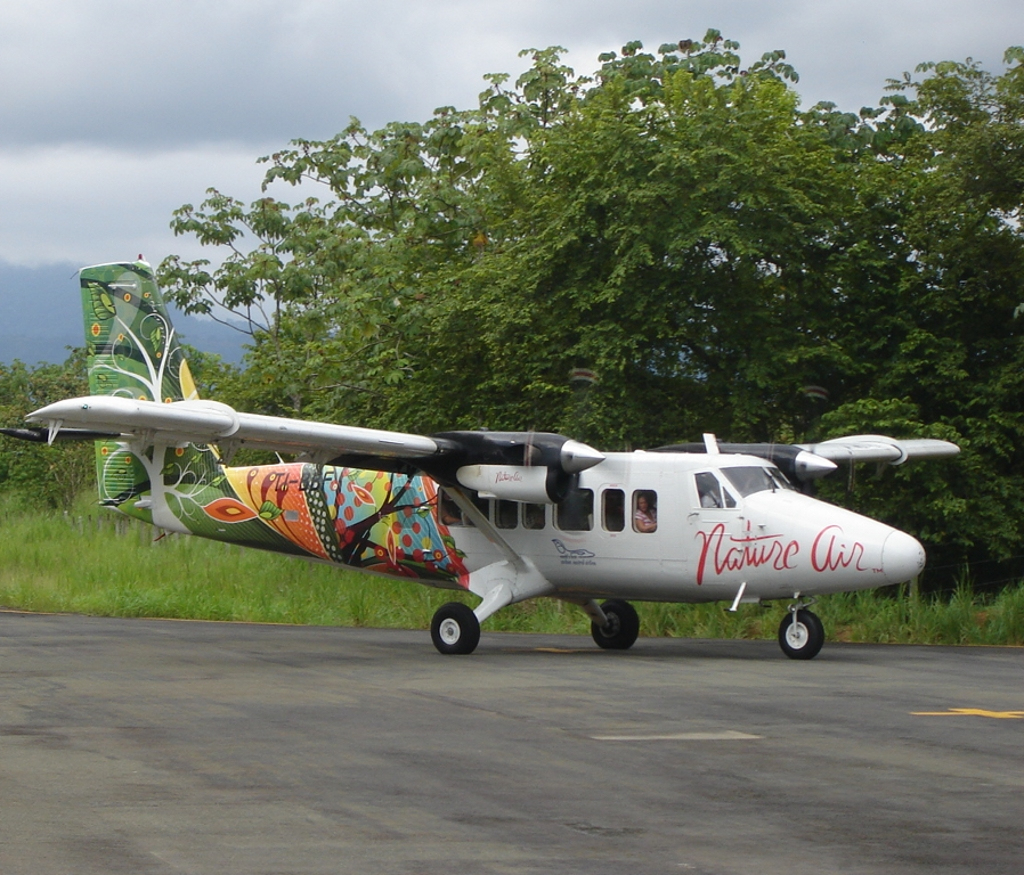
Nature Air DHC-6-300 Twin Otter arriving at La Managua Airport, Quepos, Costa Rica.

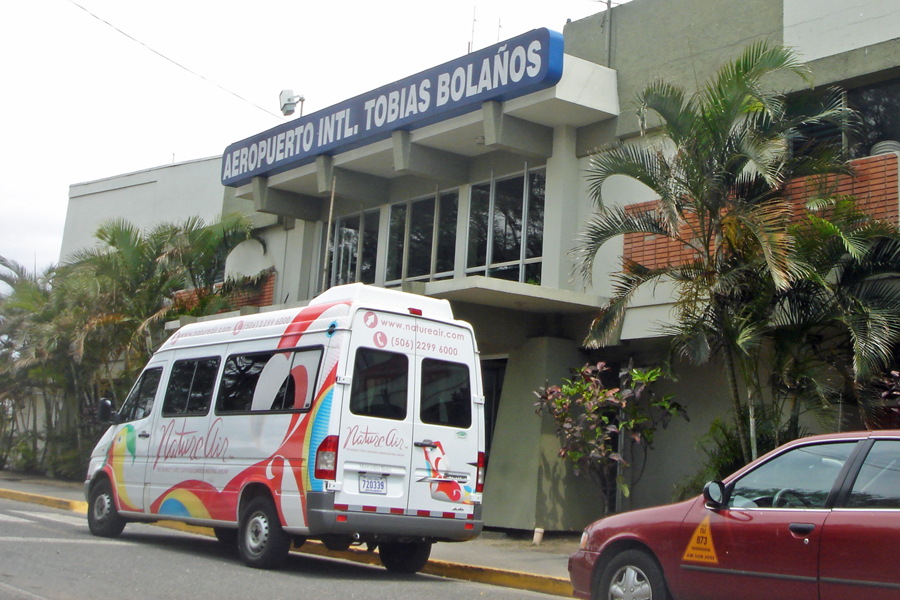
Nature Air shuttle van services between Tobías Bolaños International Airport and Juan Santamaría International Airport.

Note: Nature Air's operating license was indefinitely suspended by the civil aviation authority of Costa Rica on May 2, 2018.

Nature Air operated scheduled air passenger services to the following destinations:

Costa Rica domestic routes

- Arenal, Costa Rica
- Drake Bay, Costa Rica
- Golfito, Costa Rica
- Liberia, Costa Rica
- Limon, Costa Rica
- Nosara, Costa Rica
- Puerto Jiménez, Costa Rica
- Punta Islita Airport, Costa Rica
- Quepos, Costa Rica
- San José, Costa Rica
- Tamarindo, Costa Rica
- Tambor, Costa Rica
- Tortuguero, Costa Rica

International

- Bocas del Toro, Panama
- Managua, Nicaragua

== Fleet ==
During the period 2003 to 2015, Nature Air operated DHC-6-300 Twin Otter and Cessna 208 Grand Caravan turboprop aircraft with as many as 7 aircraft in total in its fleet. From November 2015 to July 2017 it operated four Let 410 Turbolets. From October 2017 until the cessation of operations in January 2018, the Nature Air fleet consisted of 2 Cessna 208B Grand Caravan aircraft:

== Incidents and accidents ==
The following incidents and accidents have occurred on flights operated by Nature Air:

Nature Air Reported Incidents
Flight	Date	Aircraft and Registration	Location	Passengers	Crew	Injuries			Description	Link to accident report
Flight	Date	Aircraft and Registration	Location	Passengers	Crew	Fatal	Serious	Minor		
330	December 16, 2005	DHC-6-300 TI-AZQ	Tamarindo, Costa Rica	6	2	0	2	6	Loss of control on final approach	
141	January 10, 2006	DHC-6-300 TI-BAF	Puerto Jiménez Airport, Costa Rica	11	2	0	0	1	Loss of directional control during the takeoff roll	
N/A	December 1, 2008	DHC-6-300 TI-BBQ	Tobías Bolaños International Airport, San José	13	2	0	0	0	Runway excursion on landing	
N/A (Operated by Aerobell)	September 5, 2017	Cessna 206	San Jose, Costa Rica	5	1	2	1	3	Engine failure on takeoff	
Nature Air Flight 144	December 31, 2017	Cessna 208 Caravan TI-BEI	Guanacaste, Costa Rica	10	2	12	0	0	Aerodynamic stall/spin	
