= Finca 63 Airport =

Finca 63 (Río Claro) Airport
- IATA: none; ICAO: MRFS

Summary
- Airport type: Public
- Operator: Dirección General de Aviación Civil
- Location: Río Claro, Costa Rica
- Elevation AMSL: 11 m / 36 ft
- Coordinates: 08°39′N 083°04′W

Map
- Location in Costa Rica

Runways
Direction	Length		Surface
Direction	m	ft	Surface
15/33	1,000	3,281	Broken stone
- Source: Costa Rican AIP

Finca 63 Airport (IATA: n/a, ICAO: MRFS) is an airport that serves the town of Finca 63 and the city of Río Claro, Costa Rica. The airport is located 2 mi (3.2 km) south of Río Claro.

== Scheduled service ==
None. However, Coto 47 Airport, located 10 miles southeast, receives a daily flight to Golfito and San José operated by SANSA.

== Non-scheduled service ==
Due to the abandoned state of the runway surface (as of July 2005), especially during the aerial spraying off-season, some air charter companies may offer limited or no service to this airport. Emergency air ambulance flights are supported by this airport.
Alfa Romeo Taxi Aéreo has a twin-engine Piper Aztec based at nearby Coto 47 Airport and a Cessna 206 at Golfito Airport.

== Facilities ==
The airport does not have any facilities available for independent travelers. There are hangars on both ends of the runway intended for aerial spraying aircraft support. Contact the National Helicopter Service (Servicio Nacional de Helicópteros) to inquire for possible aircraft or passenger service arrangements. There is also a private hangar lodging an ultralight aircraft (as of July 2005) on the airfield perimeter near the runway's midpoint. For food and other services, there are corner stores "pulperías" in the surroundings of the airport. Río Claro has a variety of restaurants and stores, as well as lodging options.

== How to get there ==
The airstrip is located alongside Highway 14 en route to Golfito. Buses serve both Río Claro and Golfito anywhere from San Jose and Paso Canoas. Taxi cabs are available in nearby Río Claro.

== See also ==
List of airports in Costa Rica
