= MRSA (disambiguation) =

MRSA is methicillin-resistant Staphylococcus aureus, a bacterium.

MRSA may also refer to:

- MrsA (gene), for the enzyme 2-Ketoarginine methyltransferase
- Metrolina Regional Scholars' Academy, Charlotte, North Carolina, US
- San Alberto Airport (ICAO airport code), Costa Rica
- Mat Zo (born 1990), pseudonym MRSA, British producer and DJ

== See also ==
- Methicillin-resistant Staphylococcus epidermidis (MRSE)
- Sá, a surname
- Mursa (disambiguation)
