= Chacarita =

Chacarita may refer to:

- Chacarita, Buenos Aires
- Chacarita Juniors, soccer club in Argentina
- Chacarita, Costa Rica (Chacarita District)
- Chacarita Airport, ICAO MRCH (List of airports in Costa Rica)
- Chacarita, slang word for 'shantytown' in Paraguay
