= List of airports in Costa Rica =

This is a list of airports in Costa Rica, sorted by location.

== Airports ==
| City served | Province | ICAO | IATA | Airport name | Coordinates | Runway / elevation (m) |
|---|---|---|---|---|---|---|
International airports
| Liberia | Guanacaste | MRLB | LIR | Daniel Oduber Quirós International Airport | 10°35′42″N 85°32′40″W | 07/25: 2750x45 m, asphalt (82 m) |
| Limón | Limón | MRLM | LIO | Limón International Airport | 9°57′28″N 83°01′22″W | 14/32: 1800x30 m, asphalt (2 m) |
| San José | Alajuela | MROC | SJO | Juan Santamaría International Airport | 9°59′35″N 84°12′33″W | 07/25: 3012x45 m, asphalt (921 m) |
| San José | San José | MRPV | SYQ | Tobías Bolaños International Airport | 9°57′27″N 84°08′19″W | 09/27: 1566x23 m, asphalt (1002 m) |
Domestic airports
| Barra del Colorado (es) | Limón | MRBC | BCL | Barra del Colorado Airport | 10°46′06″N 83°35′08″W | 16/34: 1000x12 m, concrete (1 m) |
| Carrillo | Guanacaste | MRCR | PLD | Playa Sámara - Carrillo Airport | 9°52′14″N 85°28′52″W | 09/27: 1200x20 m, gravel (2 m) |
| Coto 47 | Puntarenas | MRCC | OTR | Coto 47 Airport | 8°36′00″N 82°58′02″W | 18/36: 1000x20 m, asphalt (8 m) |
| Drake Bay | Puntarenas | MRDK | DRK | Drake Bay Airport | 8°43′08″N 83°38′30″W | 09/27: 750x11 m, asphalt (4 m) |
| Golfito | Puntarenas | MRGF | GLF | Golfito Airport | 8°39′13″N 83°10′53″W | 13/31: 1400x20 m, asphalt (15 m) |
| Guápiles, Pococí | Limón | MRGP | GPL | Guápiles Airport | 10°13′02″N 83°47′49″W | 03/21: 1100x10 m, concrete (269 m) |
| La Fortuna (es) | Alajuela | MRAN | FON | Arenal Airport | 10°28′09″N 84°34′44″W | 06/24: 800x10 m, asphalt (115 m) |
| Los Chiles | Alajuela | MRLC | LSL | Los Chiles Airport | 11°02′04″N 84°42′23″W | 06/24: 1400x16 m, asphalt (40 m) |
| Nosara | Guanacaste | MRNS | NOB | Nosara Airport | 9°58′34″N 85°39′10″W | 04/22: 1000x18 m, asphalt (10 m) |
| Palmar Sur | Puntarenas | MRPM | PMZ | Palmar Sur Airport | 8°57′01″N 83°28′06″W | 03/21: 1400x12 m, asphalt (15 m) |
| Puerto Jiménez | Puntarenas | MRPJ | PJM | Puerto Jiménez Airport | 8°32′07″N 83°18′04″W | 16/34: 822x18 m, asphalt (2 m) |
| Punta Islita | Guanacaste | MRIA | PBP | Punta Islita Airport | 9°51′22″N 85°22′15″W | 03/21: 800x12 m, asphalt (2 m) |
| Quepos | Puntarenas | MRQP | XQP | Quepos La Managua Airport | 9°26′34″N 84°07′47″W | 04/22: 1100x11 m, asphalt (26 m) |
| San Isidro de El General | San José | MRSI | | San Isidro de El General Airport | 9°20′55″N 83°42′45″W | 02/20: 802x18 m, asphalt (640 m) |
| Tamarindo | Guanacaste | MRTM | TNO | Tamarindo Airport | 10°18′56″N 85°48′44″W | 07/25: 800x9 m, asphalt (13 m) |
| Tambor | Puntarenas | MRTR | TMU | Tambor Airport | 9°44′21″N 85°00′58″W | 12/30: 700x12 m, asphalt (10 m) |
| Tortuguero | Limón | MRAO | TTQ | Tortuguero Airport | 10°34′02″N 83°30′50″W | 02/20: 950x12, asphalt (25 m) |
| Upala | Alajuela | MRUP | UPL | Upala Airport | 10°53′31″N 85°00′58″W | 04/22: 1000x12 m, asphalt (56 m) |
Other airports
| Buenos Aires | Puntarenas | MRBA | BAI | Buenos Aires Airport | 9°09′46″N 83°19′49″W | 01/19: 990x10 m, concrete (370 m) |
| Cabo Velas | Guanacaste | MRCV | | Cabo Velas Airport | 10°21′15″N 85°51′14″W | 04/22: 1000x10 m, asphalt (10 m) |
| Cañas | Guanacaste | MRLP | | Las Piedras Airport | 10°21′20″N 85°12′17″W | 05/23: 800x8 m, asphalt (25 m) |
| Cóbano | Puntarenas | MRAF | ACO | Cobano Airport | 9°41′32″N 85°05′45″W | |
| Puntarenas | Puntarenas | MRCH | JAP | Chacarita Airport | 9°58′53″N 84°46′21″W | 09/27: 1500x25 m, asphalt (2 m) |
| Dieciocho | Puntarenas | MRDO | | Dieciocho Airport | 8°54′12″N 83°25′35″W | 10/28: 980x12 m, gravel (6 m) |
| El Carmen de Siquirres (es) | Limón | MREC | | El Carmen de Siquirres Airport | 10°12′06″N 83°28′16″W | 06/24: 1000x12 m, concrete (17 m) |
| Finca 63 | Puntarenas | MRFS | | Finca 63 Airport | 8°39′N 83°04′W | 15/33: 1000x15 m, gravel (11 m) |
| La Flor | Guanacaste | MRLF | | La Flor Airport | 10°39′00″N 85°32′05″W | 07/25: 950x10 m, asphalt (55 m) |
| Laurel | Puntarenas | MRLE | | Laurel Airport | 8°26′25″N 82°54′30″W | 11/29: 984x15 m, asphalt (20 m) |
| Nicoya | Guanacaste | MRNC | NCT | Nicoya Airport | 10°08′21″N 85°26′44″W | 10/28: 963x18 m, gravel (120 m) |
| Palmar Sur | Puntarenas | MRFI | | Nuevo Palmar Sur Airport | 8°55′00″N 83°30′25″W | 03/21: 1000x15 m, gravel (8 m) |
| Palo Arco | Guanacaste | MRPA | | Palo Arco Airport | 9°51′07″N 85°14′15″W | 02/20: 1000x17 m, asphalt (100 m) |
| Pandora | Limón | MRPD | | Pandora Airport | 9°43′56″N 82°59′00″W | 08/26: 900x12 m, concrete (30 m) |
| Siquirres | Limón | MRSA | | San Alberto Airport | 10°08′53″N 83°29′30″W | 09/27: 1000x12 m, asphalt (27 m) |
| Santa Clara de Guapiles | Limón | MRSG | | Santa Clara de Guapiles Airport | 10°17′17″N 083°42′47″W | 01/19: 1010X12 m, asphalt |
| Santa Maria de Guacimo (es) | Limón | MRSO | | Santa Maria de Guacimo Airport | 10°16′15″N 83°35′00″W | 08/26: 1000x12 m, asphalt (10m) |
| San Vito | Puntarenas | MRSV | TOO | San Vito de Java Airport | 8°49′N 082°57′W | 08/26: 963X18 m, asphalt (984 m) |

== See also ==
- Transport in Costa Rica
- List of airports by ICAO code: M#MR - Costa Rica
- Wikipedia: WikiProject Aviation/Airline destination lists: North America#Costa Rica
