= Nuevo Palmar Sur Airport =

Nuevo Palmar Sur Airport Finca 10 Airport
- IATA: none; ICAO: MRFI

Summary
- Airport type: Public
- Owner: Directorate General of Civil Aviation
- Serves: Palmar Sur, Costa Rica
- Elevation AMSL: 25 ft / 8 m
- Coordinates: 8°55′00″N 83°30′25″W

Map
- Location in Costa Rica

Runways
Direction	Length		Surface
Direction	m	ft	Surface
34/16	1,450	4,757	Gravel
- Sources: Google Maps GCM

Nuevo Palmar Sur Airport (ICAO: MRFI) was an airport serving the hamlets of Finca (farm) 10 and Finca 5 in Puntarenas Province, Costa Rica. The runway was 6 kilometres (4 mi) southwest of the town of Palmar Sur. There is distant mountainous terrain to the north. The airport is currently closed, as indicated on the DGAC website (Direccion General de Aviacion Civil), and no trace of its runway remains, as the site has been used for agricultural crops. The only active airport in the area is Palmar Sur Airport (MRPM), located in Palmar Sur, which also serves Ciudad Cortez and Finca 5 and 10.

== See also ==
- Transport in Costa Rica
- List of airports in Costa Rica
