= Palo Arco Airport =

- IATA: none; ICAO: MRPA

Summary
- Airport type: Public
- Serves: Palo Arco
- Elevation AMSL: 328 ft / 100 m
- Coordinates: 9°51′10″N 85°14′15″W

Map
- Location in Costa Rica

Runways
Direction	Length		Surface
Direction	m	ft	Surface
02/20	1,110	3,642	Asphalt
- Sources: Google Maps GCM

Palo Arco Airport (ICAO: MRPA) is an airport serving the canton of Nandayure in Guanacaste Province, Costa Rica. There is rising terrain in all quadrants.

== See also ==
- Transport in Costa Rica
- List of airports in Costa Rica
