= La Flor Airport =

- IATA: none; ICAO: MRLF

Summary
- Airport type: Public
- Serves: La Flor, Costa Rica
- Elevation AMSL: 180 ft / 55 m
- Coordinates: 10°39′00″N 85°32′05″W

Map
- Location in Costa Rica

Runways
Direction	Length		Surface
Direction	m	ft	Surface
07/25	1,000	3,281	Grass
- Sources: Google Maps GCM SkyVector

La Flor Airport (ICAO: MRLF) is an airport serving the La Flor hacienda in Guanacaste Province, Costa Rica. The runway is 6 kilometres (4 mi) north of Daniel Oduber Quirós International Airport.

The Liberia VOR-DME (Ident: LIB) is located 3.5 nautical miles (6 km) south of the airport.

== See also ==
- Transport in Costa Rica
- List of airports in Costa Rica
