= Dieciocho Airport =

- IATA: none; ICAO: MRDO

Summary
- Airport type: Public
- Serves: Finca Dieciocho, Costa Rica
- Elevation AMSL: 20 ft / 6 m
- Coordinates: 8°54′10″N 83°25′30″W

Map
- Location in Costa Rica

Runways
Direction	Length		Surface
Direction	m	ft	Surface
11/29	980	3,215	Gravel
- Sources: Google Maps GCM SkyVector

Dieciocho Airport (ICAO: MRDO) is an agricultural airport serving Finca Dieciocho (Farm 18) and other oil palm plantations in Puntarenas Province, Costa Rica. The airport is 7 kilometres (4 mi) southeast of Palmar Sur and 1 kilometre (0.6 mi) off the Pan-American Highway. The runway lies alongside an unpaved field access road.

There are distant hills north of Dieciocho Airport. The David VOR-DME (Ident: DAV) is located 66.5 nautical miles (123 km) east-southeast of the airport.

== See also ==
- Transport in Costa Rica
- List of airports in Costa Rica
