= Southern Zone International Airport =

Southern Zone International Airport Aeropuerto Internacional de la Zona Sur
- IATA: none; ICAO: none

Summary
- Airport type: Public
- Location: Osa Canton
- Elevation AMSL: 15 m / 49 ft
- Coordinates: 08°57′04″N 083°28′07″W

Map
- Location in Costa Rica

Runways
Direction	Length		Surface
Direction	m	ft	Surface
N/A	2,200	7,218	asphalt

Southern Zone International Airport (Spanish: Aeropuerto Internacional de la Zona Sur) (this is a provisional name, as the project has not received a formal name yet) is an airport planned for construction in Osa Canton, Puntarenas Province, Costa Rica. The airport will be located in the region known as Southern Zone, where several national parks and other touristic attractions are located. The airport was a promise of former President Laura Chinchilla to boost the economic development of the region, and its construction was slated to start during her term, which ended in 2014.

Initially, it was projected to build a large airport with a long runway capable of receive the Airbus A380, but this project has been recently rejected by the government because of the high cost and the environmental impact such an airport can cause.

The project will have a total cost of US$42 million and the environmental impact and other assessment studies are underway. When open, the airport will be the third largest in the country, after Juan Santamaría International Airport and Daniel Oduber International Airport. Google Earth imagery of 2019-02-07 shows an apparently finished runway approximately 1000 meters long but little supporting infrastructure.

== See also ==
- Transport in Costa Rica
- List of airports in Costa Rica
- Economy of Costa Rica
