= Samara Airport =

Samara Airport may refer to:

- Carrillo Airport, in Costa Rica
- Kurumoch International Airport, in Samara Oblast, Russia
- Samara Airport (Ethiopia), in Semera, Afar Region, Ethiopia
