= El Carmen de Siquirres Airport =

- IATA: none; ICAO: MREC

Summary
- Airport type: Public
- Serves: El Carmen, Costa Rica
- Elevation AMSL: 56 ft / 17 m
- Coordinates: 10°12′07″N 83°28′20″W

Map
- Location in Costa Rica

Runways
Direction	Length		Surface
Direction	m	ft	Surface
08/26	1,020	3,346	Asphalt
- Sources: Google Maps GCM SkyVector

El Carmen de Siquirres Airport (ICAO: MREC) is an airport serving the village and Del Monte banana plantation at El Carmen in Limón Province, Costa Rica. The plantation is 12 kilometres (7 mi) north of Siquirres.

The Limon VOR-DME (Ident: LIO) is located 30.0 nautical miles (56 km) east-southeast of the airport.

== See also ==
- Transport in Costa Rica
- List of airports in Costa Rica
