= Guápiles Airport =

- IATA: GPL; ICAO: MRGP

Summary
- Airport type: Public
- Operator: DGAC
- Serves: Guápiles, Costa Rica
- Elevation AMSL: 883 ft / 269 m
- Coordinates: 10°13′00″N 83°47′50″W

Map
- Location of airport in Costa Rica

Runways
| Direction | Length | | Surface |
| Direction | m | ft | Surface |
|---|---|---|---|
| 04/22 | 1,135 | 3,724 | Concrete |
- Source: GCM Google Maps SkyVector

Guápiles Airport (IATA: GPL, ICAO: MRGP) is an airport serving Guápiles, a town in Pococí canton, Limón Province, Costa Rica. The runway is within the western section of the town.

The El Coco VOR-DME (Ident: TIO) is located 29.5 nautical miles (55 km) west-southwest of the airport. The Limon VOR-DME (Ident: LIO) is located 48.0 nautical miles (89 km) east-southeast of Guápiles Airport.

== See also ==
- Transport in Costa Rica
- List of airports in Costa Rica
