= Las Piedras Airport =

- IATA: none; ICAO: MRLP

Summary
- Airport type: Private
- Serves: Cañas District, Costa Rica
- Elevation AMSL: 82 ft / 25 m
- Coordinates: 10°21′20″N 85°12′17″W

Map
- Location in Costa Rica

Runways
Direction	Length		Surface
Direction	m	ft	Surface
05/23	835	2,740	Asphalt
- Sources: Google Maps GCM SkyVector

Las Piedras Airport (ICAO: MRLP) is an airport serving the agricultural region southwest of Cañas in Guanacaste Province, Costa Rica. The nearest town is Bebedero, 1.6 kilometres (1 mi) north-northeast.

The Liberia VOR-DME (Ident: LIB) is located 24.6 nautical miles (45.6 km) west-northwest of the airport.

== See also ==
- Transport in Costa Rica
- List of airports in Costa Rica
