= Barra del Colorado Airport =

Barra del Colorado Airport Aeropuerto de Barra del Colorado
- IATA: BCL; ICAO: MRBC

Summary
- Airport type: Public
- Operator: DGAC
- Serves: Barra del Colorado Wildlife Refuge, Costa Rica
- Location: Barra del Colorado Sur
- Elevation AMSL: 3 ft (0.91 m)
- Coordinates: 10°46′10″N 83°35′10″W

Map
- Location of airport in Costa Rica

Runways
Direction	Length		Surface
Direction	m	ft	Surface
16/34	1,000	3,281	Concrete
- Source: AIP Costa Rica, GCM SkyVector

Barra del Colorado Airport (IATA: BCL, ICAO: MRBC) is an airport serving the Barra del Colorado Wildlife Refuge in Limón Province, Costa Rica. The airport is on the Colorado River, near the Caribbean coast.

== See also ==
- Transport in Costa Rica
- List of airports in Costa Rica
