= Santa Maria de Guacimo Airport =

Airport in Costa Rica

- IATA: none; ICAO: MRSO

Summary
- Airport type: Public
- Serves: Santa Maria de Guacimo
- Elevation AMSL: 33 ft (10 m)
- Coordinates: 10°16′15″N 83°35′00″W

Map
- Location in Costa Rica

Runways
Direction	Length		Surface
Direction	m	ft	Surface
08/26	1,000	3,280	Asphalt
- Sources: Google Maps GCM

Santa Maria de Guacimo Airport (ICAO: MRSO) is an airport serving the village of Santa Maria de Guacimo in Limón Province, Costa Rica.

== See also ==
- Transport in Costa Rica
- List of airports in Costa Rica
