= Tamarindo Airport =

Airport in Costa Rica

- IATA: TNO; ICAO: MRTM

Summary
- Airport type: Private
- Serves: Tamarindo, Costa Rica
- Elevation AMSL: 43 ft (13 m)
- Coordinates: 10°18′55″N 85°48′50″W

Map
- Location in Costa Rica

Runways
Direction	Length		Surface
Direction	m	ft	Surface
07/25	890	2,920	Asphalt

Statistics (2017)
- Passengers: 26,624
- Passenger change 16–17: ▲6.4%
- Source: AIP GCM SkyVector

Tamarindo Airport (IATA: TNO, ICAO: MRTM) is a private airport that serves Tamarindo, a coastal resort in Guanacaste province, Costa Rica. It receives daily scheduled flights from San José and Liberia, and private charter services are available. During the rainy season, the airport is frequently closed due to the weather.

Tamarindo airport is the fifth-busiest in the country by passenger traffic, the third-busiest domestic-only airport after Puerto Jiménez and Quepos, and the busiest privately managed airport in Costa Rica.

== Airlines and destinations ==
Airlines	Destinations
Aerobell Airlines	San José–Tobías Bolaños
Sansa Airlines	San José–Juan Santamaría
Skyway Airlines	San José–Juan Santamaría

== Passenger statistics ==
These data show number of passengers movements into the airport, according to the Directorate General of Civil Aviation of Costa Rica's statistical yearbooks.

Year	2010	2011	2012	2013	2014	2015	2016	2017
Passengers	20,755	17,807	16,548	15,436	30,108	18,209	25,012	26,624
Growth (%)	▼21.15%	▼14.20%	▼7.07%	▼6.72%	▲95.05%	▼39.52%	▲37.38%	▲6.44%
Source: Costa Rica's Directorate General of Civil Aviation (DGAC). Statistical Yearbooks (Years 2010, 2011, 2012, 2013, 2014, 2015, 2016, and 2017)

Year	2000	2001	2002	2003	2004	2005	2006	2007	2008	2009
Passengers	29,748	27,132	29,762	35,434	40,633	36,679	41,400	40,118	34,143	26,321
Growth (%)	N.A.	▼8.79%	▲9.69%	▲19.06%	▲14.67%	▼9.73%	▲12.87%	▼3.10%	▼14.89%	▼22.91%
Source: Costa Rica's Directorate General of Civil Aviation (DGAC). Statistical Yearbooks (Years 2000-2005, 2006, 2007, 2008, and 2009 )

== See also ==
- Transport in Costa Rica
- List of airports in Costa Rica
