= Laurel Airport =

Laurel Airport may refer to:

- Laurel Airport (Costa Rica), an airport serving Laurel, Costa Rica (ICAO: MRLE)
- Laurel Airport (Delaware), an airport serving Laurel, Delaware, United States (FAA: N06)
- Laurel Municipal Airport, an airport serving Laurel, Montana, United States (FAA: 6S8)
- Hesler-Noble Field, an airport serving Laurel, Mississippi, United States (FAA/IATA: LUL)

Other airports in places named Laurel:

- Hattiesburg-Laurel Regional Airport, an airport serving Laurel, Mississippi, United States (FAA/IATA: PIB)
- Suburban Airport, an airport serving Laurel, Maryland, United States (FAA: W18)
