= Nicoya Airport =

Nicoya Guanacaste Airport Miguel Angel Castillo Zumbado Airport
- IATA: NCT; ICAO: MRNC

Summary
- Airport type: Public
- Operator: DGAC
- Serves: Nicoya, Costa Rica
- Elevation AMSL: 394 ft / 120 m
- Coordinates: 10°08′22″N 85°26′45″W

Map
- Location in Costa Rica

Runways
Direction	Length		Surface
Direction	m	ft	Surface
10/28	965	3,166	Asphalt

Statistics (2014)
- Passengers: 96
- Passenger change 13–14: ▼2.0%
- Source: DGAC SkyVector Google Maps

Nicoya Airport (IATA: NCT, ICAO: MRNC) is an airport serving the city of Nicoya in the Guanacaste Province of Costa Rica. The airport is owned and managed by the country's Directorate General of Civil Aviation.

The asphalt runway is 965 metres (3,166 ft) long, and has very basic facilities to receive small airplanes and passengers. There are nearby hills south and west of the runway.

The Liberia VOR-DME (Ident: LIB) is located 27.9 nautical miles (52 km) north-northwest of the airport.

== Passenger Statistics ==
Although Nicoya Airport serves the main city in the Nicoya Peninsula, there are no scheduled domestic or international service to the airport.

These data show number of passengers movements into the airport, according to the Directorate General of Civil Aviation of Costa Rica's Statistical Yearbooks.

Year	2008	2009	2010	2011	2012	2013	2014	2015
Passengers	129	112	110	106	131	98	96	T.B.A.
Growth (%)	▼56.86%	▼13.18%	▼1.79%	▼3.64%	▲23.58%	▼25.19%	▼2.04%	T.B.A.
Source: Costa Rica's Directorate General of Civil Aviation (DGAC). Statistical Yearbooks (Years 2008, 2009, 2010, 2011, 2012, 2013, and 2014)

Year	2000	2001	2002	2003	2004	2005	2006	2007
Passengers	N.D.	N.D.	30	172	190	144	348	299
Growth (%)	N.D.	N.D.	N.D.	▲473.33%	▲10.47%	▼24.21%	▲141.67%	▼14.08%
Source: Costa Rica's Directorate General of Civil Aviation (DGAC). Statistical Yearbooks (Years 2000-2005, 2006, and 2007,)

== See also ==
- Transport in Costa Rica
- List of airports in Costa Rica
