= Cabo Velas Airport =

Airport in Guanacaste Province, Costa Rica

- IATA: none; ICAO: MRCV

Summary
- Airport type: Public
- Serves: Playa Grande, Costa Rica
- Elevation AMSL: 33 ft / 10 m
- Coordinates: 10°21′15″N 85°51′15″W

Map
- Location in Costa Rica

Runways
Direction	Length		Surface
Direction	m	ft	Surface
04/22	1,000	3,281	Asphalt
- Sources: Google Maps GCM SkyVector

Cabo Velas Airport (ICAO: MRCV) is an airport serving the Pacific coastal villages along the Playa Grande, north of Tamarindo in Guanacaste Province, Costa Rica.

There are hills west and northeast of the airport. South approach and departure are over the water. There is an additional 280 metres (920 ft) unpaved overrun on the south end of the runway.

The Liberia VOR-DME (Ident: LIB) is located 23.0 nautical miles (43 km) northeast of the airport.

== See also ==
- Transport in Costa Rica
- List of airports in Costa Rica
