= San Vito de Java Airport =

Airport in San Vito, Puntarenas Province, Costa Rica

- IATA: TOO; ICAO: MRSV

Summary
- Airport type: Public
- Serves: San Vito, Costa Rica
- Elevation AMSL: 3,228 ft / 984 m
- Coordinates: 8°49′38″N 82°57′30″W

Map
- Location in Costa Rica

Runways
Direction	Length		Surface
Direction	m	ft	Surface
08/26	985	3,232	Asphalt
- Sources: Google Maps GCM SkyVector

San Vito de Java Airport (IATA: TOO, ICAO: MRSV) is an airport serving the town of San Vito in Puntarenas Province, Costa Rica. San Vito is 5 miles (8 km) west of the border with Panama.

There is a wide ravine just short of Runway 08, and rising terrain in all quadrants. The Coto 47 non-directional beacon (Ident: COT) is located 13.4 nautical miles (25 km) south of the airport. The David VOR-DME (Ident: DAV) is located 40.7 nautical miles (75 km) southeast of the airport.

== See also ==
- Transport in Costa Rica
- List of airports in Costa Rica
