= Huacas District =

District in Hojancha canton, Guanacaste province, Costa Rica

Huacas
- District
- Interactive map of Huacas
- Huacas district location in Costa Rica
- Coordinates: 10.0357253°N 85.35947°W
- Country: Costa Rica
- Province: Guanacaste
- Canton: Hojancha
- Creation: 23 July 1999

Area
  - Total: 31.49 km^{2} (12.16 sq mi)
- Elevation: 570 m (1,870 ft)

Population (2011)
  - Total: 707
  - Density: 22.5/km^{2} (58.1/sq mi)
- Time zone: UTC−06:00
- Postal code: 51104

Huacas is a district of the Hojancha canton, in the Guanacaste province of Costa Rica.

== History ==
Huacas was created on 23 July, 1999 by Decreto Ejecutivo 28027-G. It was segregated from Hojancha.

== Geography ==
Huacas has an area of 31.49 km^{2} (12.16 sq mi) and an elevation of 570 metres.

== Villages ==
The administrative center of the district is the village of Huacas.

Other villages in the district are Avellana, Pita Rayada, Río Blanco Oeste, and Tres Quebradas.

== Demographics ==
Historical population
Census	Pop.	±% p.a.
2000	697	—
2011	707	+0.13%
2022	726	+0.24%
Source: Instituto Nacional de Estadística y Censos; Centro Centroamericano de Población

For the 2011 census, Huacas had a population of 707 inhabitants.
