= Pandora Airport =

- IATA: none; ICAO: MRPD

Summary
- Airport type: Public
- Serves: Pandora, Costa Rica
- Elevation AMSL: 98 ft / 30 m
- Coordinates: 9°43′56″N 82°59′00″W

Map
- Location in Costa Rica

Runways
Direction	Length		Surface
Direction	m	ft	Surface
08/26	900	2,953	Asphalt
- Sources: Google Maps GCM

Pandora Airport (ICAO: MRPD) is an airport serving the village of Pandora in Limón Province, Costa Rica. There is a large hill just north of the runway.

== See also ==
- Transport in Costa Rica
- List of airports in Costa Rica
