= Santa Clara de Guapiles Airport =

- IATA: none; ICAO: MRSG

Summary
- Airport type: Public
- Serves: Humo
- Elevation AMSL: 246 ft / 75 m
- Coordinates: 10°17′17″N 83°42′49″W

Map
- Location in Costa Rica

Runways
Direction	Length		Surface
Direction	m	ft	Surface
01/19	1,010	3,315	Asphalt
- Sources: Google Maps GCM

Santa Clara de Guapiles Airport (ICAO: MRSG) is an airport serving the village of Humo in Limón Province, Costa Rica. The runway is surrounded by the pineapple plantations of Piña Frut, S.A.

== See also ==
- Transport in Costa Rica
- List of airports in Costa Rica
