= South Zone =

South Zone or Southern Zone may refer to:

- South Zone cricket team, an Indian first-class cricket team
- South Zone cricket team (Bangladesh), a Bangladeshi first-class cricket team
- South Zone Culture Centre, in Thanjavur, Tamil Nadu, India
- South Zone of São Paulo, Brazil
- South Zone (Rio de Janeiro), the southern section of the city of Rio de Janeiro, Brazil
- Southern Zone International Airport, an airport planned for construction in Osa Canton, Puntarenas Province, Costa Rica
- Southern Zone, Tigray, a zone in Tigray Region, Ethiopia
- Southern Indo-Aryan languages
- Zona Sur, a natural region of Chile
- Zone libre, a partition of the France during the Second World War, called the South Zone from November 1942
