= GLF =

GLF may refer to:

== Transportation ==
- Glenfinnan railway station, in Scotland
- Golfito Airport, in Costa Rica

== Other uses ==
- Garden Gnome Liberation Front
- Gay Liberation Front
- Global Landscapes Forum
- Global Leadership Foundation
- Glock Large Frame, a frame pattern for pistols chambered in 10mm Auto and .45 ACP, for example
- Grange League Federation, now Agway, an American agricultural business
- Great Leap Forward
- Swedish Recording Industry Association (Swedish Grammofonleverantörernas Förening)
