= Upala Airport =

- IATA: UPL; ICAO: MRUP

Summary
- Airport type: Public
- Serves: Upala, Costa Rica
- Elevation AMSL: 184 ft / 56 m
- Coordinates: 10°53′30″N 85°01′00″W

Map
- Location in Costa Rica

Runways
Direction	Length		Surface
Direction	m	ft	Surface
04/22	1,078	3,537	Asphalt
- Sources: Google Maps GCM SkyVector

Upala Airport (IATA: UPL, ICAO: MRUP) is an airport serving the town of Upala in Alajuela Province, Costa Rica. Upala is 10 kilometres (6 mi) south of the Nicaragua border.

The runway is just south of the town, across the small Zapote River. There are 300 metres (980 ft) of unpaved overrun on the southwest end of the runway.

The Los Chiles non-directional beacon (Ident: CHI) is located 20.1 nautical miles (37 km) east-northeast of the airport. The Liberia VOR-DME (Ident: LIB) is located 36.1 nautical miles (67 km) west-southwest of the airport.

== See also ==
- Transport in Costa Rica
- List of airports in Costa Rica
