= Monte Romo =

District in Hojancha canton, Guanacaste province, Costa Rica

- District
- Monte Romo district
- Monte Romo district location in Costa Rica
- Coordinates: 9.963434°N 85.3890384°W
- Country: Costa Rica
- Province: Guanacaste
- Canton: Hojancha
- Creation: 23 July 1999

Area
  - Total: 74.97 km^{2} (28.95 sq mi)
- Elevation: 685 m (2,247 ft)

Population (2011)
  - Total: 671
  - Density: 8.95/km^{2} (23.2/sq mi)
- Time zone: UTC−06:00
- Postal code: 51102

Monte Romo is a district of the Hojancha canton in the Guanacaste province of Costa Rica.

== History ==
Monte Romo was created on 23 July, 1999 by Decreto Ejecutivo 28027-G. It was segregated from Hojancha.

== Geography ==
Monte Romo has an area of 74.97 km^{2} (28.95 sq mi) and an elevation of 685 metres.

== Villages ==
The administrative center of the district is the village of Monte Romo.

Other villages in the district are Altos del Socorro, Bajo Saltos, Cabrera, Cuesta Roja, Delicias, Guapinol, Loros, Mercedes, Palmares, Río Zapotal, San Isidro, and Trinidad.

== Demographics ==
Historical population
Census	Pop.	±% p.a.
2000	799	—
2011	671	−1.57%
2022	764	+1.19%
Source: Instituto Nacional de Estadística y Censos; Centro Centroamericano de Población

For the 2011 census, Monte Romo had a population of 671 inhabitants.

== Transportation ==
=== Road transportation ===
The district is covered by the following road routes:

- National Route 902
