= Mursa (disambiguation) =

Mursa was a Roman town in Pannonia (present-day Osijek in eastern Croatia). It may also refer to:

- Mursa (moth), the genus of moths
- Luciobarbus mursa, the barbel species
- ŽKK Mursa, the basketball club
- MRSA or methicillin-resistant Staphylococcus aureus
