= Laurel Airport (Costa Rica) =

- IATA: none; ICAO: MRLE

Summary
- Airport type: Public
- Operator: DGAC
- Serves: Laurel, Costa Rica
- Elevation AMSL: 213 ft / 65 m
- Coordinates: 08°26′25″N 82°54′30″W

Map
- Location in Costa Rica

Runways
Direction	Length		Surface
Direction	m	ft	Surface
11/29	98	322	Asphalt
- Source: AIP SkyVector

Laurel Airport (ICAO: MRLE) is an airport serving the village of Laurel in Puntarenas Province, Costa Rica. The airport is among palm oil plantations, near the border with Panama.

== Facilities ==
There are hangars on the threshold of runway 11 that support aerial spraying and ultralight aircraft. The runway is on the southwest edge of the village.

== See also ==
- Transport in Costa Rica
- List of airports in Costa Rica
