= National Route 158 (Costa Rica) =

National Road Route in Costa Rica

National Secondary Route 158
- Ruta nacional secundaria 158

Route information
- Maintained by Ministry of Public Works and Transport
- Length: 39.220 km (24.370 mi)

Location
- Country: Costa Rica
- Provinces: Guanacaste

Highway system
- National Road Network of Costa Rica
← Route 157	→ Route 159

National Secondary Route 158, or just Route 158 (Spanish: Ruta Nacional Secundaria 158, or Ruta 158) is a National Road Route of Costa Rica located in the Guanacaste province.

== Description ==
In Guanacaste province the route covers Nicoya canton (Mansión district), Hojancha canton (Hojancha, Puerto Carrillo, and Matambú districts).
