= Carrillo Airport =

Airport in Costa Rica

Carrillo Airport Playa Sámara/Carrillo Airport
- IATA: PLD; ICAO: MRCR

Summary
- Airport type: Public/Private
- Operator: DGAC
- Serves: Puerto Carrillo, Costa Rica
- Elevation AMSL: 50 ft (15 m)
- Coordinates: 9°52′15″N 85°28′50″W

Map
- Location of airport in Costa Rica

Runways
Direction	Length		Surface
Direction	m	ft	Surface
09/27	1,050	3,445	Grass
- Source: AIP SkyVector

Carrillo Airport (IATA: PLD, ICAO: MRCR) is an airport serving Puerto Carrillo, a Pacific coastal village in Guanacaste Province, Costa Rica. The airport and village are 5 kilometres (3 mi) east of Sámara village.

== Facilities ==
The airport has a grass landing strip and a covered shelter that is occasionally used to weigh luggage before boarding. There are no amenities nearby. As of 2024, the airport has not been in use for several years and remains closed.

== See also ==
- Transport in Costa Rica
- List of airports in Costa Rica
