= Mursa phtisialis =

Scientific classification
- Kingdom: Animalia
- Phylum: Arthropoda
- Class: Insecta
- Order: Lepidoptera
- Superfamily: Noctuoidea
- Family: Erebidae
- Genus: Mursa
- Species: M. phtisialis

Binomial name
- Mursa phtisialis Guenée, 1854

Synonyms
- Physula phtisialis Guenée, 1854; Mursa calisalis Walker, 1859; Aganzagara disparatalis Walker, [1866]

Species of moth

Mursa phtisialis, the mallow mursa moth, is a moth of the family Erebidae. The species was first described by Achille Guenée in 1854. It is found on Cuba, the southern parts of the United States, Jamaica, Central and South America.

The larvae feed on Malva acuta.
