= Puerto Carrillo =

District in Hojancha canton, Guanacaste province, Costa Rica

- District
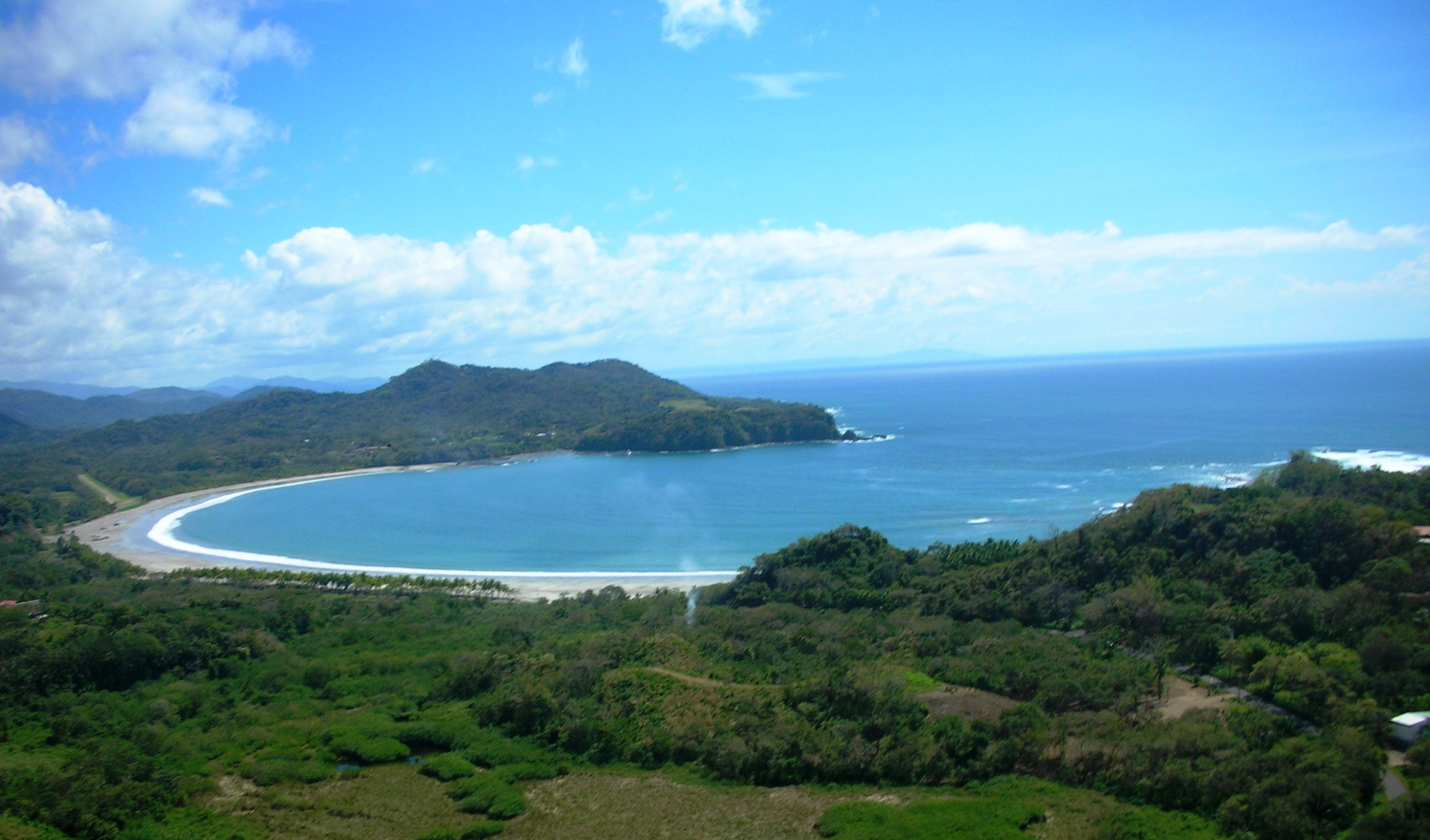
- Aerial view of Carrillo
- Puerto Carrillo district
- Puerto Carrillo district location in Costa Rica
- Coordinates: 9.9250378°N 85.4435498°W
- Country: Costa Rica
- Province: Guanacaste
- Canton: Hojancha
- Creation: 23 July 1999

Area
  - Total: 76.75 km^{2} (29.63 sq mi)
- Elevation: 40 m (130 ft)

Population (2011)
  - Total: 1,574
  - Density: 20.51/km^{2} (53.12/sq mi)
- Time zone: UTC−06:00
- Postal code: 51103

Puerto Carrillo is a district of the Hojancha canton, in the Guanacaste province of Costa Rica.

== History ==
Puerto Carrillo was created on 23 July 1999 by Decreto Ejecutivo 28027-G. It was segregated from Hojancha.

== Geography ==
Puerto Carrillo has an area of 76.75 km^{2} (29.63 sq mi) and an elevation of 40 metres.

Situated along the Pacific Coast of Costa Rica's Guanacaste Province, Puerto Carrillo is a jewel among Costa Rica's Pacific beaches. It is generally very quiet, but it is popular with Costa Rican families on weekends and holidays. There is no development along the beach, with only pushcarts selling snacks on the nearby road. The town itself is very small (less than 500 full-time residents) with a handful of nice hotels, restaurants, small food markets, and tour operators. There are also many more options in the nearby town of Samara, just 7 km away. The population in Carrillo is mainly local residents and still maintains an authentically Costa Rican atmosphere, but there are also expatriates who live there. The district has a population of around 1,800 people.

== Economy ==
=== Tourism ===
Puerto Carrillo is a small community that hosts sport fishing boats in the world since its discovery as a billfish destination over 15 years ago. The tiny harbor affords protection to a small handful of charter and private boats that are permanently based here. The white sand beach is popular with swimmers and families with kids. Playa Carrillo is never crowded, and it offers picnic areas right on the beach.

Carrillo also offers beautiful and secluded small beaches nearby. El Roble is a rocky beach with its own waterfall and tide pools. Playa El Sur a beautiful medium size beach surrounded by palm trees (only accessible by boat). Playa Samara, 7 km to the north, is a much larger beach with waves generally near knee to waist high, and is a popular place for beginning surfers and families.

== Demographics ==
Historical population
Census	Pop.	±% p.a.
2000	1,287	—
2011	1,574	+1.85%
2022	1,764	+1.04%
Source: Instituto Nacional de Estadística y Censos; Centro Centroamericano de Población

For the 2011 census, Puerto Carrillo had a population of 1,574 inhabitants.

== Transportation ==
=== Road transportation ===
The district is covered by the following road routes:

- National Route 158
- National Route 160
- National Route 901

Carrillo is located approximately 41 km (25 mi) from Nicoya, the economic and administrative hub of the region. Access to Carrillo is via paved roads. The paving of the "Road 150" from Nicoya through Sámara to Carrillo was completed in early 2006, which greatly increased the accessibility of the region and dramatically reduced driving times. The total drive now takes about 4 hours from San Jose's Juan Santamaría International Airport (SJO) and 2 hours from Liberia's Daniel Oduber International Airport (LIR), although traffic and construction can increase those times. Public buses operate between nearby Sámara and Nicoya several times a day; express buses operated by Empresa Alfaro also connect Sámara with San José usually twice a day (except weekends).

Air service was provided by Sansa Airlines to the adjacent Carrillo Airport. The airport is no longer in use.

== Villages ==
Administrative center of the district is the village of Puerto Carrillo.

Other villages in the district are Angostura, Arbolito, Cuesta Malanoche, Estrada Rábago, Jobo, Lajas, Quebrada Bonita (partly), San Miguel and Santa María.

== Gallery ==
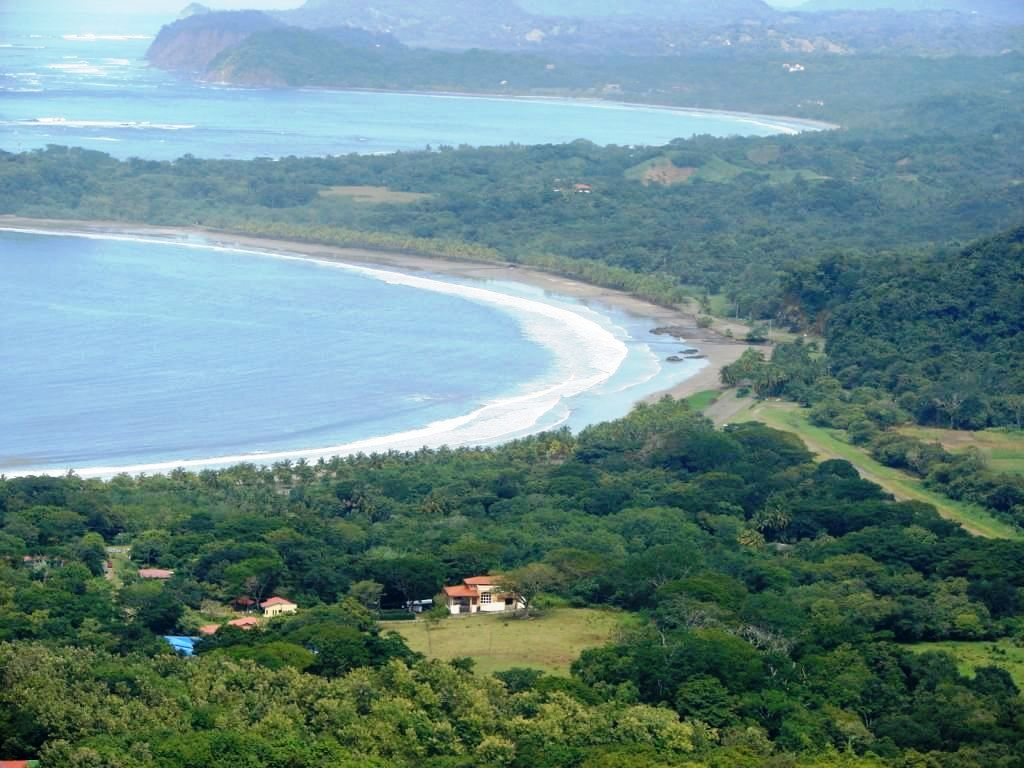
Aerial photo of Carrillo Beach

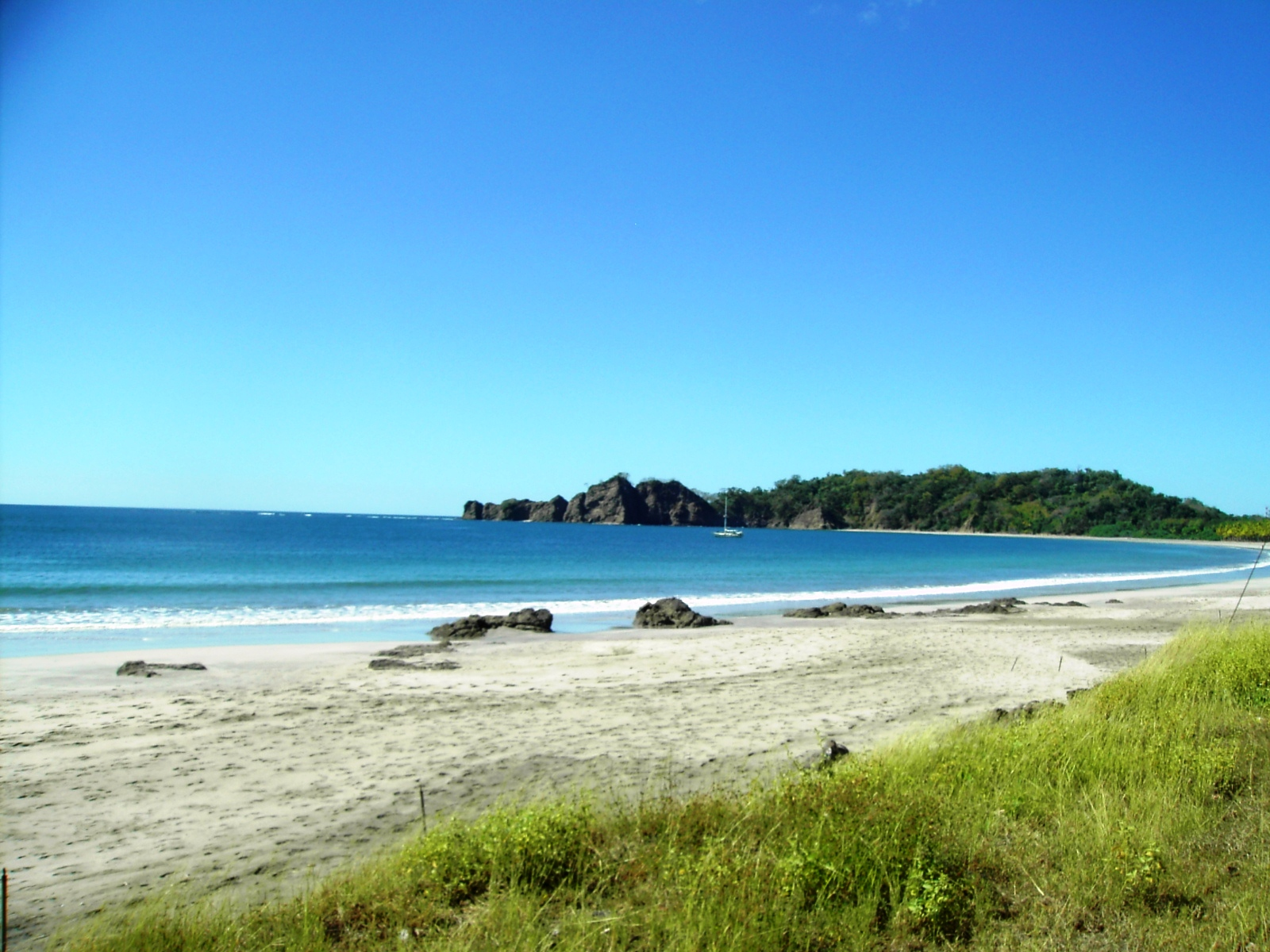
Carrillo Beach

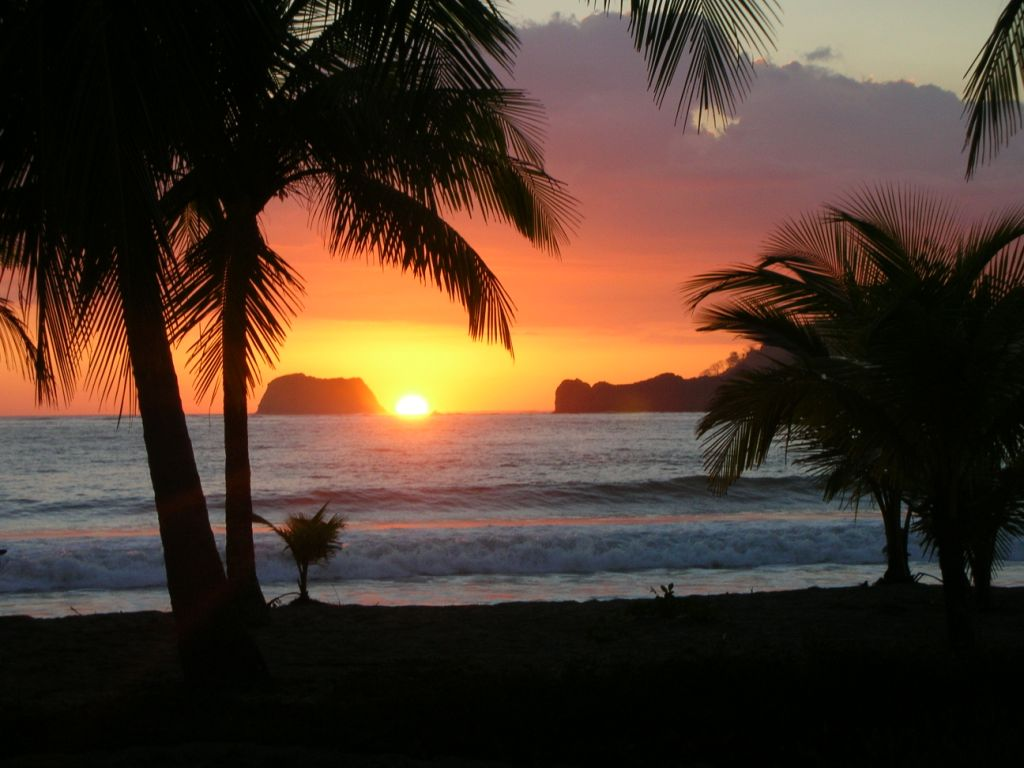
Carrillo Beach Sunset

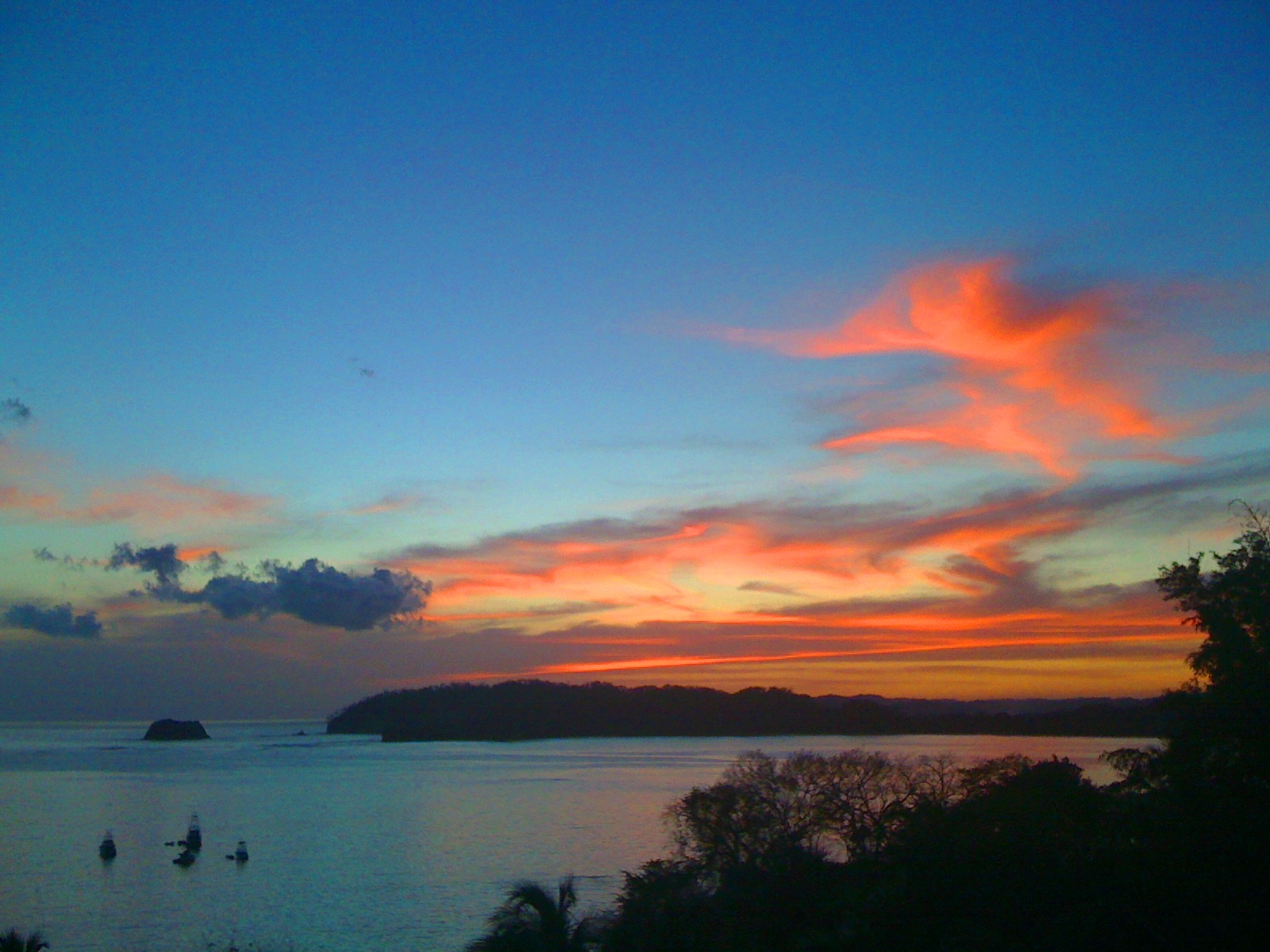
Carrillo Beach Sunset

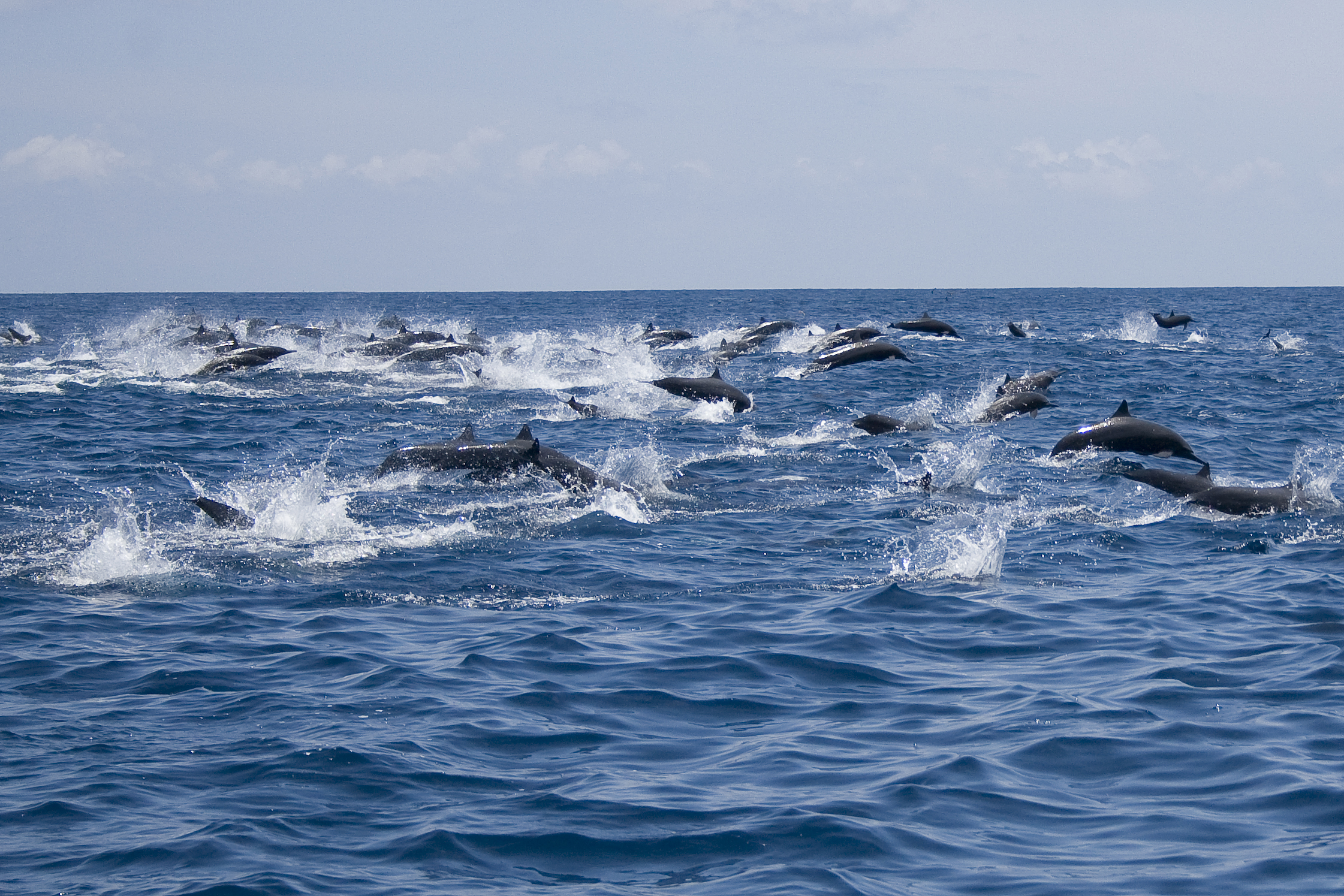
Spinner dolphins right off the coast of Carrillo

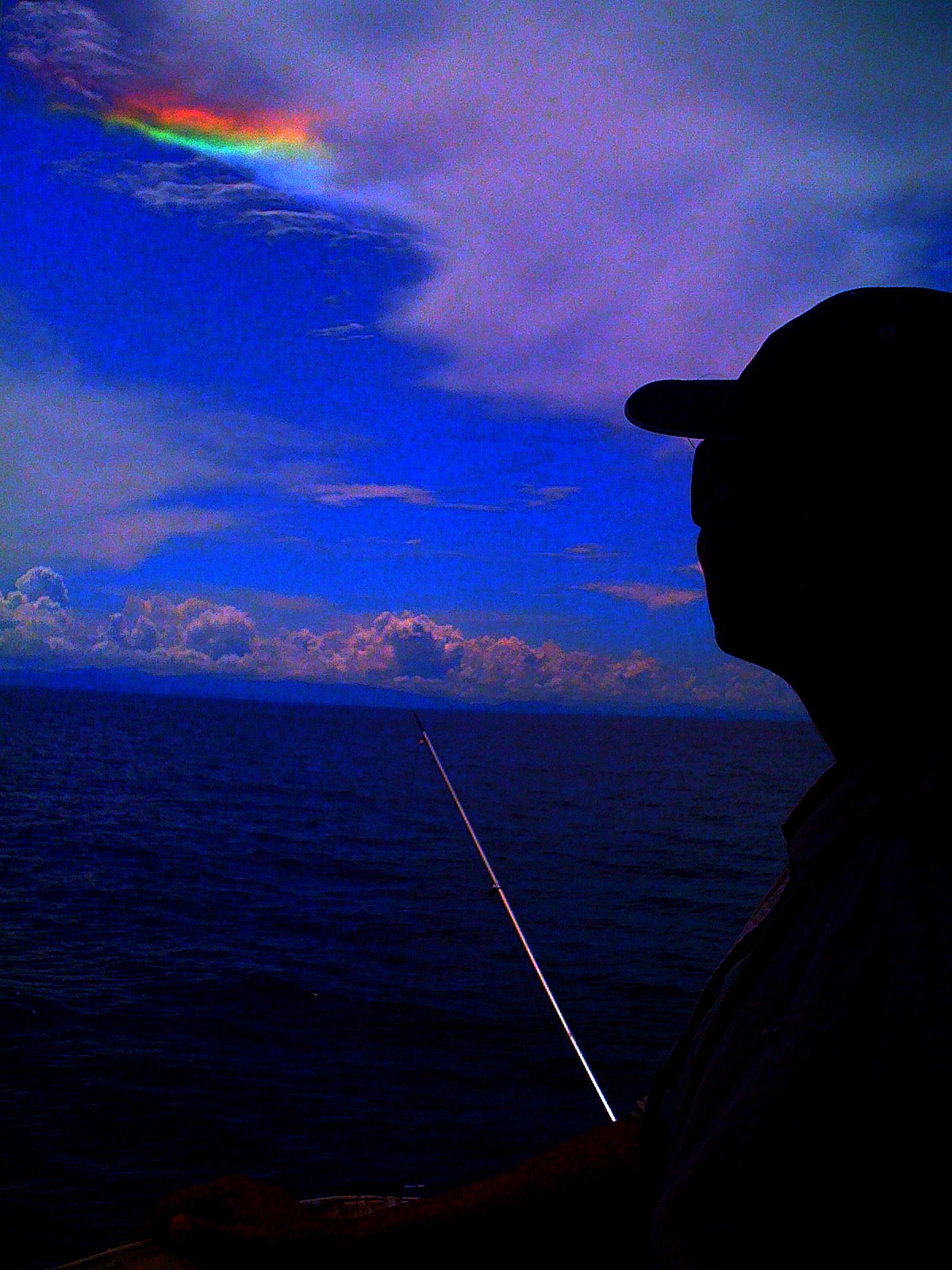
Fire rainbow right off the coast of Carrillo

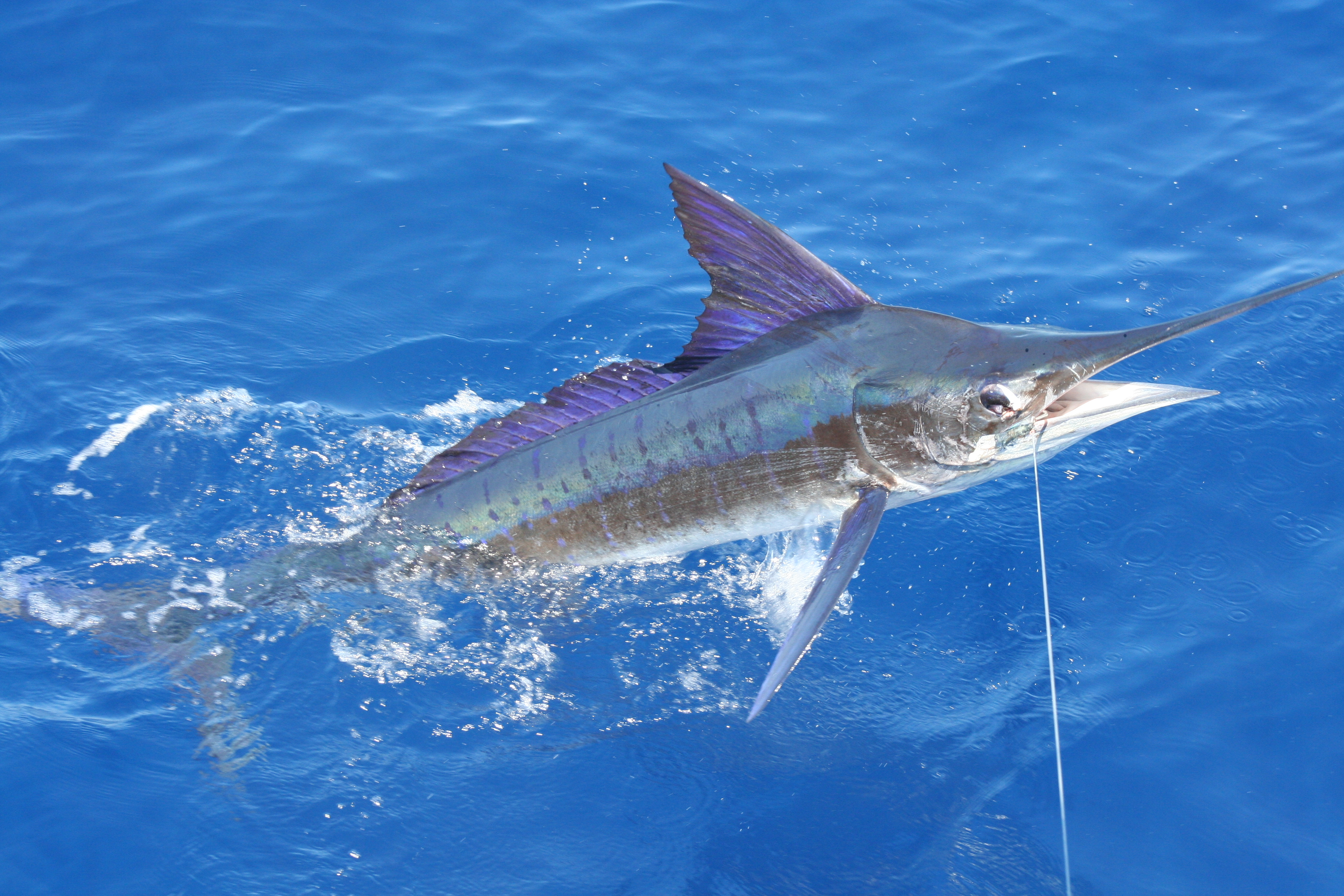
Stripe marlin right off the coast of Carrillo

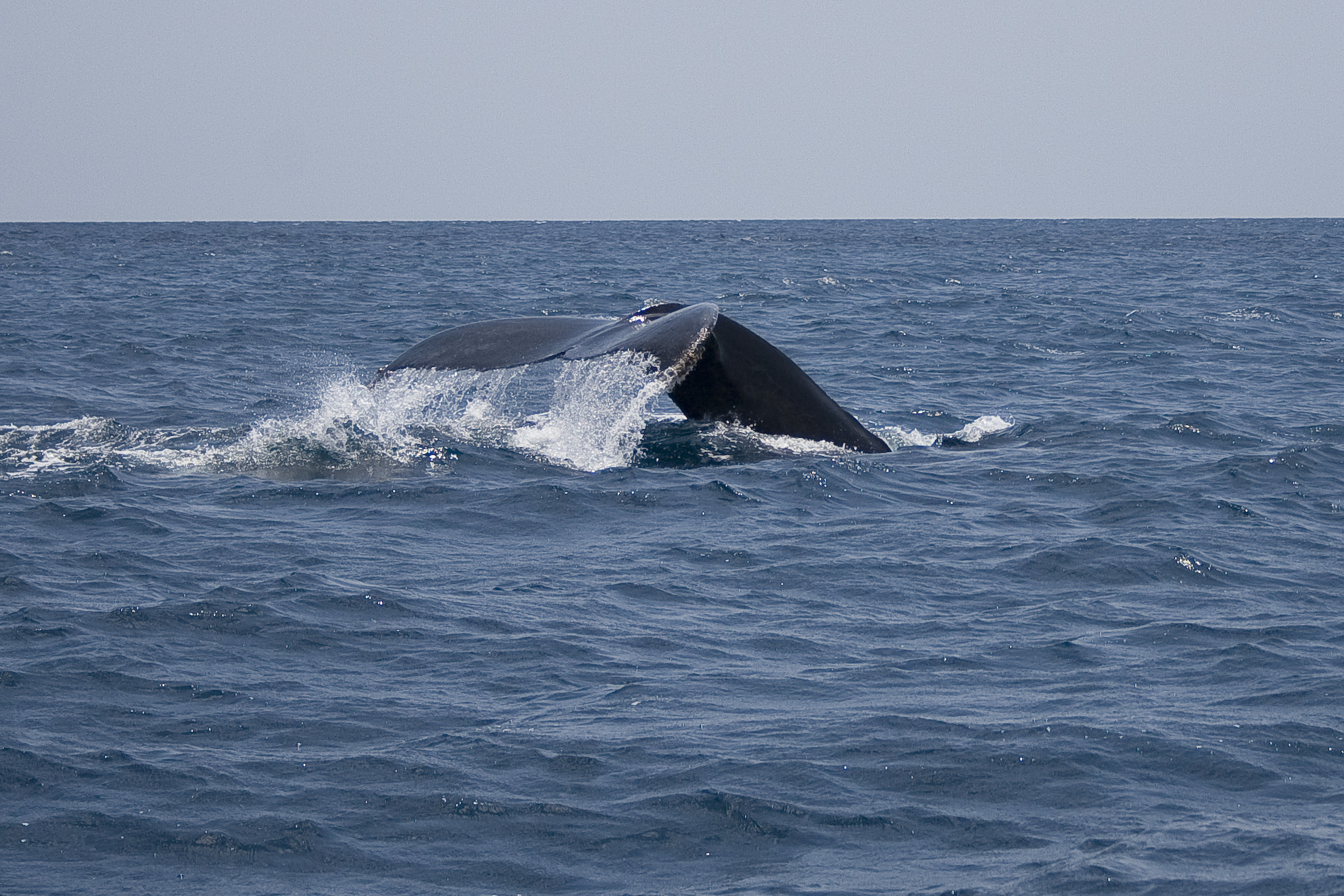
Humpback whale fluking right off the coast of Carrillo

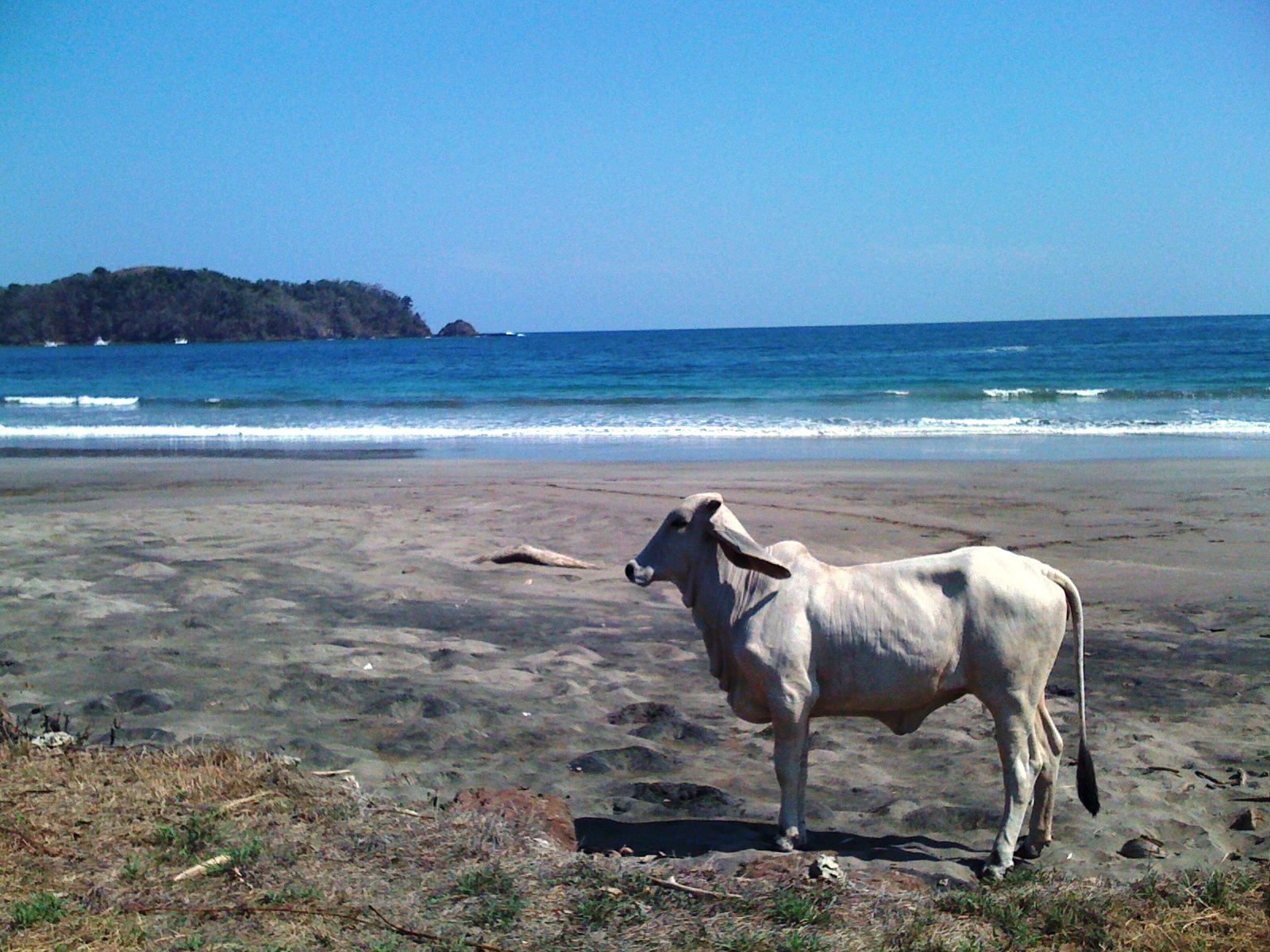
