= San Alberto Airport =

- IATA: none; ICAO: MRSA

Summary
- Airport type: Public
- Serves: Siquirres
- Elevation AMSL: 88 ft / 27 m
- Coordinates: 10°08′53″N 83°29′30″W

Map
- Location in Costa Rica

Runways
| Direction | Length | | Surface |
| Direction | m | ft | Surface |
|---|---|---|---|
| 09/27 | 1,110 | 3,642 | Asphalt |
- Sources: Google Maps GCM

San Alberto Airport (ICAO: MRSA) is an airport serving the city of Siquirres in Limón Province, Costa Rica. The airport is 5 kilometres (3.1 mi) north of the city.

== See also ==
- Transport in Costa Rica
- List of airports in Costa Rica
