= Hojancha (canton) =

Canton in Guanacaste province, Costa Rica

- Canton
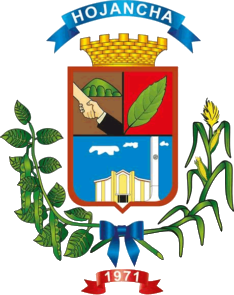
- Flag Seal
- Interactive map of Hojancha
- Hojancha canton location in Costa Rica
- Coordinates: 9.9752817°N 85.4095116°W
- Country: Costa Rica
- Province: Guanacaste
- Creation: 2 November 1971
- Head city: Hojancha
- Districts: Districts: Hojancha; Monte Romo; Puerto Carrillo; Huacas; Matambú

Government
  - Type: Municipality
  - Body: Municipalidad de Hojancha

Area
  - Total: 261.42 km^{2} (100.93 sq mi)
- Elevation: 389 m (1,276 ft)

Population (2011)
  - Total: 7,197
  - Density: 27.53/km^{2} (71.30/sq mi)
- Time zone: UTC−06:00
- Canton code: 511
- Website: www.munihojancha.com

Hojancha is a canton in the Guanacaste province of Costa Rica. The head city is in Hojancha district.

== History ==
Hojancha was created on 2 November 1971 by decree 4887.

On 5 September 2012, a magnitude 7.6 earthquake struck 12 kilometers northeast of Hojancha, destroying houses in the canton.

== Geography ==
Hojancha has an area of 261.42 km^{2} (100.93 sq mi) and a mean elevation of 389 metres.

The canton is in the midsection of the Nicoya Peninsula. It is relatively compact, with a slim area reaching south to encompass a small portion of the Pacific coastline from Carrillo Beach southward to the mouth of the Ora River.

== Districts ==
The canton of Hojancha is subdivided into the following districts:

1. Hojancha
2. Monte Romo
3. Puerto Carrillo
4. Huacas
5. Matambú

== Demographics ==
Historical population
Census	Pop.	±% p.a.
1973	7,899	—
1984	5,879	−2.65%
2000	6,534	+0.66%
2011	7,197	+0.88%
2022	8,224	+1.22%
Source: Instituto Nacional de Estadística y Censos; Centro Centroamericano de Población

For the 2011 census, Hojancha had a population of 7,197 inhabitants.

== Transportation ==
=== Road transportation ===
The canton is covered by the following road routes:

- National Route 158
- National Route 160
- National Route 901
- National Route 902
