= Matambú =

District in Hojancha canton, Guanacaste province, Costa Rica

- District and Indigenous Territory
- Interactive map of Matambú
- Matambú district location in Costa Rica
- Coordinates: 10.08605°N 85.4179269°W
- Country: Costa Rica
- Province: Guanacaste
- Canton: Hojancha
- Creation: 25 July 2017
- Elevation: 300 m (980 ft)
- Time zone: UTC−06:00
- Postal code: 51105

Matambú is a district of the Hojancha canton, in the Guanacaste province of Costa Rica.

It is the only Chorotega indigenous territory.

== History ==
Matambú was created on 25 July 2017 by Ley 9463.

== Geography ==
Matambú has an elevation of 300 metres.

== Demographics ==
Historical population
Census	Pop.	±% p.a.
2022	1,070	—
Source: Instituto Nacional de Estadística y Censos; Centro Centroamericano de Población

For the 2011 census, Matambú had not been created, therefore no census data is available as its inhabitants were part of other districts.

== Transportation ==
=== Road transportation ===
The district is covered by the following road routes:

- National Route 158
