= Coto 47 Airport =

- IATA: OTR; ICAO: MRCC

Summary
- Airport type: Public
- Serves: Ciudad Neily (es), Costa Rica
- Location: Coto 47
- Elevation AMSL: 26 ft / 8 m
- Coordinates: 8°36′05″N 82°58′08″W

Map
- Location in Costa Rica

Runways
Direction	Length		Surface
Direction	m	ft	Surface
18/36	1,000	3,281	Asphalt
- Costa Rican AIP GCM Google Maps

Coto 47 Airport (IATA: OTR, ICAO: MRCC) is an airport serving Coto 47, a community among the oil palm plantations in Puntarenas Province, Costa Rica. The runway is 16 kilometres (9.9 mi) from the Panama border.

The Coto 47 non-directional beacon (Ident: COT) is located on the field.

The airport is accessible to locations such as Pavones, Sabalos, Neily (es) and Playa Zancudo. A scheduled bus, the Finca 40, leaves for Neily daily, and there are also many taxis available for transport to other locations.

== Airlines and destinations ==
Airlines	Destinations
Sansa Airlines	Golfito, San José–Juan Santamaría

== See also ==
- Transport in Costa Rica
- List of airports in Costa Rica
