= Chacarita Airport =

Airport in Puntarenas Province, Costa Rica

- IATA: JAP; ICAO: MRCH

Summary
- Airport type: Public
- Serves: Chacarita, Costa Rica
- Elevation AMSL: 7 ft / 2 m
- Coordinates: 9°58′53″N 84°46′20″W

Map
- Location in Costa Rica

Runways
Direction	Length		Surface
Direction	m	ft	Surface
10/28	1,520	4,987	Asphalt
- Sources: Google Maps GCM SkyVector

Chacarita Airport (IATA: JAP, ICAO: MRCH) is an airport serving the town of Chacarita in Puntarenas Province, Costa Rica. Chacarita is on the Pacific coast at the base of the Puntarenas peninsula, just east of Puntarenas city.

The runway parallels the Gulf of Nicoya shoreline, 300 metres (980 ft) inland. The El Coco VOR-DME (Ident: TIO) is located 31.7 nautical miles (59 km) east of the airport.

== See also ==
- Transport in Costa Rica
- List of airports in Costa Rica
