= 2-Ketoarginine methyltransferase =

Class of enzymes

Identifiers
- EC no.: 2.1.1.243

Databases
- IntEnz: IntEnz view
- BRENDA: BRENDA entry
- ExPASy: NiceZyme view
- KEGG: KEGG entry
- MetaCyc: metabolic pathway
- PRIAM: profile
- PDB structures: RCSB PDB PDBe PDBsum
Search
- PMC: articles
- PubMed: articles
- NCBI: proteins

2-Ketoarginine methyltransferase (EC 2.1.1.243, mrsA (gene)) is an enzyme with systematic name S-adenosyl-L-methionine:5-carbamimidamido-2-oxopentanoate S-methyltransferase. This enzyme catalyses the following chemical reaction

5-guanidino-2-oxopentanoic acid
+ SAM
(3R)-5-guanidino-3-methyl-2-oxopentanoic acid
+ SAH

This is a methylation reaction in which the methyl group comes from the cofactor, S-adenosyl methionine (SAM), which becomes S-adenosyl-L-homocysteine (SAH). The enzyme was characterised from Pseudomonas syringae. It is involved in production of the rare amino acid 3-methylarginine. Other organisms use it to incorporate that amino acid into arginomycin.
