= Golfito Airport =

Airport in Costa Rica

- IATA: GLF; ICAO: MRGF

Summary
- Airport type: Public
- Operator: DGAC
- Serves: Golfito, Costa Rica
- Elevation AMSL: 49 ft / 15 m
- Coordinates: 8°39′14″N 83°10′55″W

Map
- Location in Costa Rica

Runways
Direction	Length		Surface
Direction	m	ft	Surface
13/31	1,395	4,577	Asphalt

Statistics (2014)
- Passengers: 15,771
- Passenger change 13–14: ▲12.5%
- Source: AIP GCM SkyVector

Golfito Airport (IATA: GLF, ICAO: MRGF) is an airport serving Golfito, a port town on the northwest end of Golfito Bay, an inlet off the Gulf of Dulce in the Puntarenas Province of Costa Rica. The airport is owned and managed by the country's Directorate General of Civil Aviation (DGAC).

The airport is in a narrow valley running inland from the bay, with high terrain on both sides of the runway, and high terrain immediately off the northwest end.

== Airlines and destinations ==
Airlines	Destinations
Sansa Airlines	Coto 47, San José–Juan Santamaría

== Passenger Statistics ==
Golfito Airport is eighth-busiest in the country by passenger traffic. These data show number of passengers movements into the airport, according to the Directorate General of Civil Aviation of Costa Rica's Statistical Yearbooks.

Year	2008	2009	2010	2011	2012	2013	2014	2015
Passengers	20,687	14,846	15,073	15,086	16,546	14,018	15,771	T.B.A.
Growth (%)	▲11.79%	▼28.24%	▲1.53%	▲0.09%	▲9.68%	▼15.28%	▲12.51%	T.B.A.
Source: Costa Rica's Directorate General of Civil Aviation (DGAC). Statistical Yearbooks (Years 2008, 2009, 2010, 2011, 2012, 2013, and 2014 DGAC Yearbook 2014)

Year	2000	2001	2002	2003	2004	2005	2006	2007
Passengers	17,928	18,004	14,530	14,117	14,569	15,194	17,604	18,506
Growth (%)	N.A.	▲0.42%	▼19.30%	▼2.84%	▲3.20%	▲4.29%	▲15.86%	▲5.12%
Source: Costa Rica's Directorate General of Civil Aviation (DGAC). Statistical Yearbooks (Years 2000-2005, 2006, and 2007,)

== See also ==
- Transport in Costa Rica
- List of airports in Costa Rica
