= Mursa (moth) =

Scientific classification
- Kingdom: Animalia
- Phylum: Arthropoda
- Class: Insecta
- Order: Lepidoptera
- Superfamily: Noctuoidea
- Family: Erebidae
- Subfamily: Boletobiinae
- Genus: Mursa; Walker, 1859

Synonyms
- Aganzagara Walker, [1866]; Paramimetica Warren, 1889; Sisputa Möschler, 1890

Genus of moths

Mursa is a genus of moths of the family Erebidae.

== Taxonomy ==
The genus has previously been classified in the subfamily Phytometrinae within Erebidae or in the subfamily Herminiinae of the family Noctuidae.

== Species ==
- Mursa fuscireticulata (Kaye, 1901)
- Mursa gracilis (Möschler, 1890)
- Mursa imitatrix (Warren, 1889)
- Mursa phtisialis (Guenée, 1854)
- Mursa sotiusalis (Walker, 1859)
- Mursa subrufa (Warren, 1889)
