= Coto 47 =

Coordinates: 8.601°N 82.967°W

Coto 47 is a city in the province of Puntarenas, Costa Rica. The city is located near the Costa Rica-Panama border.

== Education ==
There is one school in the city, the Central Coto 47 School.

== Transportation ==
The city is served by Coto 47 Airport, with domestic commercial flights to Golfito and San Jose on Sansa Airlines.
