= Finca 63 =

Finca 63 is a town nearby Río Claro, Costa Rica, located 2 miles south on Costa Rica Highway 14 in Puntarenas Province. The airport in Finca 63 serves the city of Río Claro.

Map of Finca 63
