= Hojancha District =

District in Hojancha canton, Guanacaste province, Costa Rica

Hojancha
- District
- Interactive map of Hojancha
- Hojancha district location in Costa Rica
- Coordinates: 10.0455932°N 85.4265636°W
- Country: Costa Rica
- Province: Guanacaste
- Canton: Hojancha

Area
  - Total: 79.05 km^{2} (30.52 sq mi)
- Elevation: 350 m (1,150 ft)

Population (2011)
  - Total: 4,245
  - Density: 53.70/km^{2} (139.1/sq mi)
- Time zone: UTC−06:00
- Postal code: 51101

Hojancha is a district of the Hojancha canton, in the Guanacaste province of Costa Rica.

== Geography ==
Hojancha has an area of 79.05 km^{2} (30.52 sq mi) and an elevation of 350 metres.

== Villages ==
The administrative center of the district is the village of Palmira.

Other villages in the district include Ángeles, Comunidad, Paso Tempisque (partly), and San Rafael.

== Demographics ==
Historical population
Census	Pop.	±% p.a.
1973	7,899	—
1984	5,879	−2.65%
2000	3,751	−2.77%
2011	4,245	+1.13%
2022	3,900	−0.77%
Source: Instituto Nacional de Estadística y Censos; Centro Centroamericano de Población

According to the 2011 census, Hojancha had a population of 4,245 inhabitants.

== Transportation ==
=== Road transportation ===
The district is covered by the following road routes:

- National Route 158
- National Route 902
