= Transport in Costa Rica =

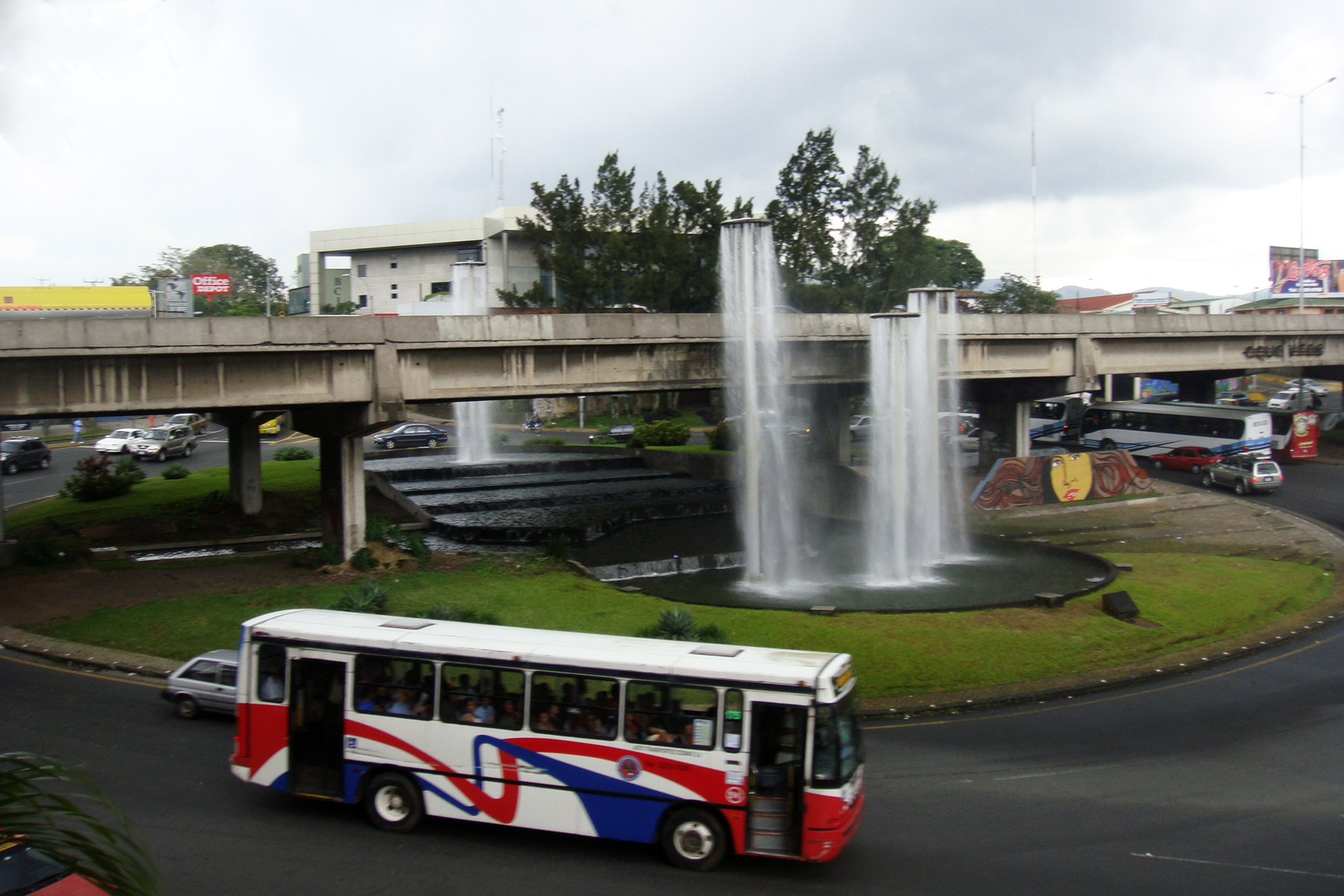
San Pedro roundabout in San José

There are many modes of transport in Costa Rica but the country's infrastructure has suffered from a lack of maintenance and new investment. There is an extensive road system of more than 30,000 kilometers, although much of it is in disrepair; this also applies to ports, railways and water delivery systems. According to a 2016 U.S. government report, investment from China that attempted to improve the infrastructure found the "projects stalled by bureaucratic and legal concerns".

Most parts of the country are accessible by road. The main highland cities in the country's Central Valley are connected by paved all-weather roads with the Atlantic and Pacific coasts and by the Pan American Highway with Nicaragua and Panama, the neighboring countries to the north and to the south. Costa Rica's ports are struggling to keep pace with growing trade. They have insufficient capacity, and their equipment is in poor condition. The railroad didn't function for several years, until recent government effort to reactivate it for city transportation. An August 2016 OECD report provided this summary: "The road network is extensive but of poor quality, railways are in disrepair and only slowly being reactivated after having been shut down in the 1990s. Seaports’ quality and capacity are deficient. Internal transportation overly relies on private road vehicles as the public transport system, especially railways, is inadequate."

== Railways ==
- total: 278 km (173 mi)
- narrow gauge: 278 km (173 mi) of 3 ft 6 in (1,067 mm) gauge (260 km (162 mi) electrified)

== Road transportation ==
The road system in Costa Rica is not as developed as it might be expected for such a country. However, there are some two-lane trunk roads with restricted access under development.

- Total: 35,330 km (21,953 mi)
- Paved: 8,621 km (5,357 mi)
- Unpaved: 26,709 km (16,596 mi)

=== National road network ===
The Ministry of Public Works and Transport (MOPT), along with the National Road Council (Conavi), are the government organizations in charge of national road nomenclature and maintenance.

There are three levels in the national road network:

- Primary roads: These are trunk roads devised to connect important cities, most of the national roads are connected to the capital city, San José. There are 19 national primary roads, numbered between 1 and 39.
- Secondary roads: These are roads that connect different cities, or primary routes, directly. There are 129 national secondary roads, numbered between 100 and 257.
- Tertiary roads: These roads connect main cities to villages or residential areas, there are 175 national tertiary roads, numbered between 301 and 935.

== Waterways ==
730 km (454 mi), seasonally navigable by small craft

== Pipelines ==
- refined products 242 km (150 mi)

== Ports and harbors ==
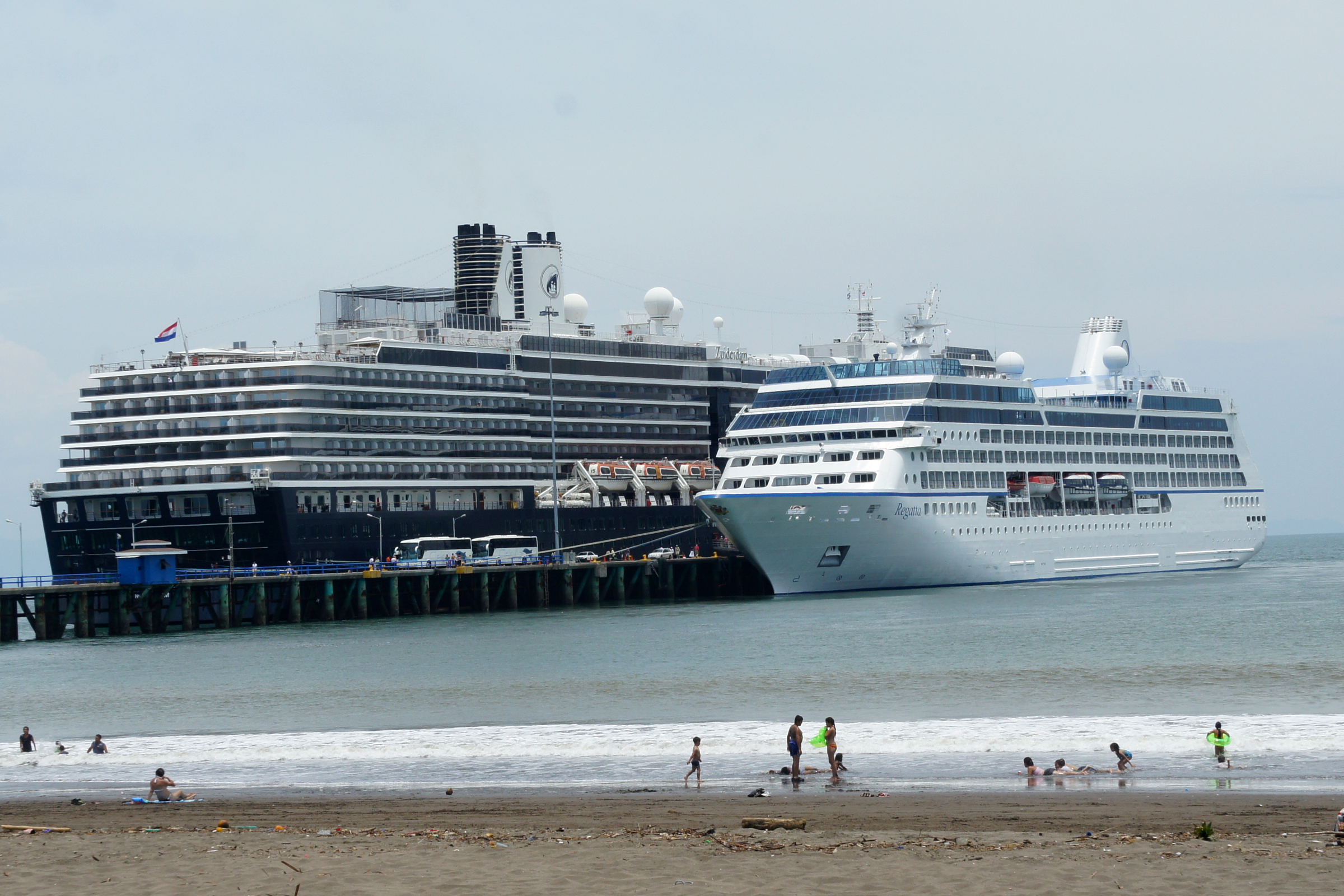
Cruise ships at Puntarenas.

In 2016, the government pledged ₡93 million ($166,000) for a new cruise ship terminal for Puerto Limón.

=== Atlantic Ocean ===
- Port of Moín, operated by JAPDEVA.
- Port of Limón, operated by JAPDEVA.
- Moín Container Terminal, operated by APM Terminals.

=== Pacific Ocean ===
- Golfito
- Puerto Quepos
- Puntarenas (cruise ships only)
- Caldera Port

== Merchant marine ==
- total: 2 ships (1,000 gross tonnage (GT) or over) 2,308 GT/743 tonnes deadweight (DWT)
- ships by type:
  - passenger/cargo ships 2

== Airports ==
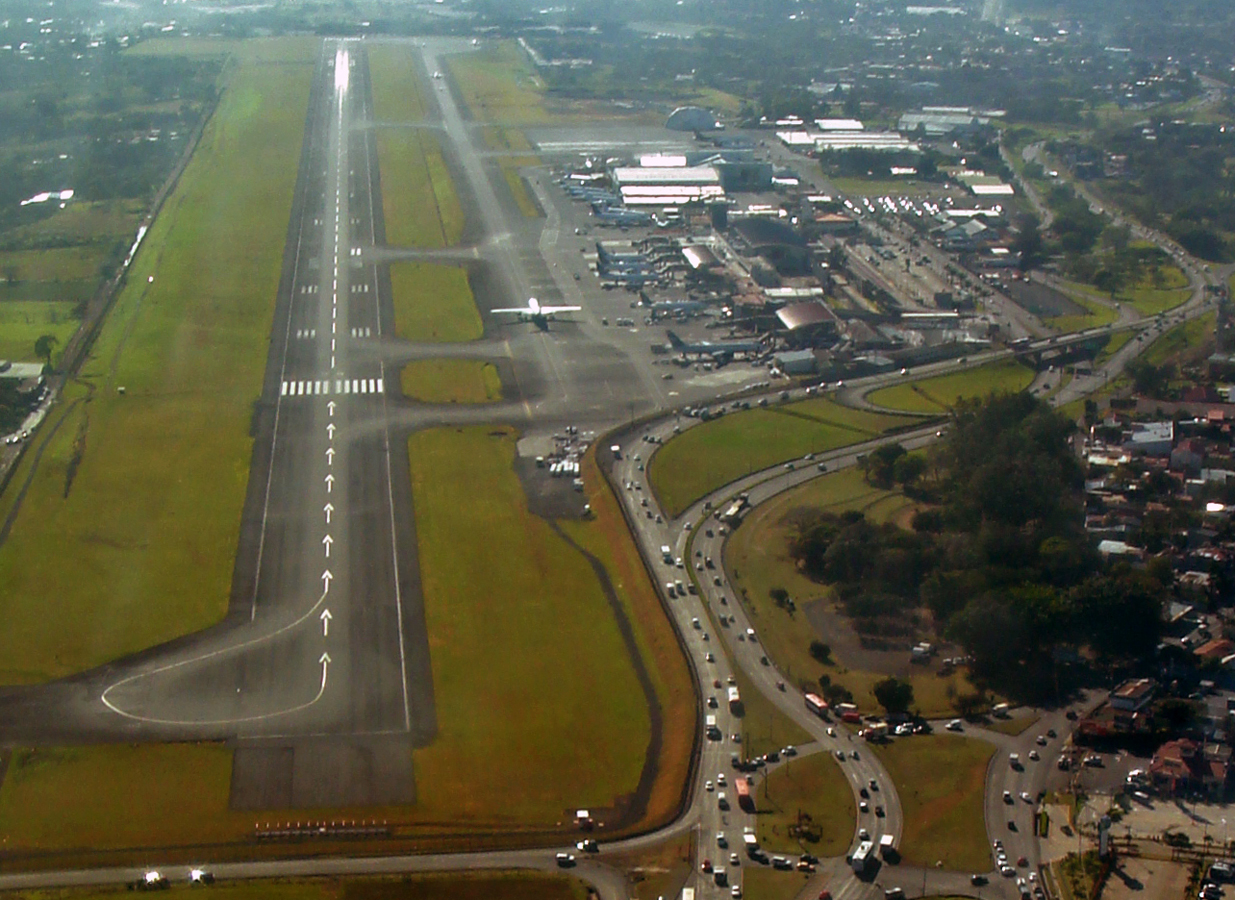
Juan Santamaría International Airport.

Total: 161 (2013)

=== Airports - with paved runways ===
- total: 47 (2013)
- 2,438 to 3,047 m (7,999 to 9,997 ft): 2
- 1,524 to 2,437 m (5,000 to 7,995 ft): 2
- 914 to 1,523 m (2,999 to 4,997 ft): 27
- under 914 metres (2,999 ft): 16

=== Airports - with unpaved runways ===
- total: 114 (2013)
- 914 to 1,523 m (2,999 to 4,997 ft): 18
- under 914 metres (2,999 ft): 96
